= List of ruling political parties by country =

This list of ruling political parties by country is presented in the form of a table that includes a link to an overview of political parties with parliamentary representation in each country and shows which party system is dominant in each country. A political party is a political organization subscribing to a certain ideology or formed around special issues with the aim to participate in power, usually by participating in elections. Individual parties are properly listed in separate articles under each nation.

The ruling party in a parliamentary system is the political party or coalition of the majority (or sometimes a plurality) in parliament. It generally forms the central government. In other countries, the party of the executive may differ from the majority party in the legislature.

== Sovereign states ==
Country	Party system	Ruling party or coalition Other parties	Last election
Afghanistan	Non-partisan (Note: All political parties are banned as "un-Islamic". The Taliban is the only legal political force in the current regime.)	Taliban	None; see 2021 takeover
Albania	Multi-party	Socialist Party of Albania Democratic Party – Alliance for a Magnificent Albania (PD, PL, PDIU, PAA, PBDNJ, PR, PBDNJ), PSD, PM, LSDB, LB	2025 (parliament)
Algeria	Multi-party	National Liberation Front, RND, Future Front, El-Bina MSP, LP, FBG, FDJ, EFED, PLJ, Jil Jadid, FAN, El Karama, FNA, FFS	2024 (presidential); 2026 (legislative)
Andorra	Multi-party	Democrats for Andorra, Committed Citizens, Action, Liberals Concord, Social Democratic Party, Andorra Forward	2023 (parliament)
Angola	Dominant-party	People's Movement for the Liberation of Angola UNITA, PRS, FNLA, PHA	2022 (general)
Antigua and Barbuda	Dominant-party	Antigua and Barbuda Labour Party United Progressive Party (off. opp.), Barbuda People's Movement	2026 (general)
Barbuda	Dominant-party	Barbuda People's Movement Antigua and Barbuda Labour Party	2025 (council)
Argentina	Multi-party	La Libertad Avanza–CREO, PRO–MID, ELI, Independence, FyL, PyT, SF Union for the Homeland, EF, UCR, DpS, FIT–Unidad, IF, CC–ARI, SER, DSF, MPN, Unidos, TBT, RU	2023 (general); 2025 (legislative)
Armenia	Multi-party	Civil Contract Armenia Alliance (ARF, independents), I Have Honor Alliance (RPA, independents), Homeland Party	2021 (parliament)
Australia	Multi-party	Australian Labor Party Coalition (Liberal, National) (off. opp.), Greens, KAP, CA, One Nation, AV, JLN, UAP	2025 (federal)
Australian Capital Territory	Dominant-party	Labor Party Liberals (off. opp.), Greens, FCI	2024 (parliament)
New South Wales	Multi-party	Labor Party Coalition (Liberal Party, National Party) (off. opp.), Greens, SFF, AJP, LCA, LP	2023 (parliament)
Northern Territory	Two-party	Country Liberal Party Labor Party (off. opp.)	2024 (parliament)
Queensland	Multi-party	Liberal National Party Labor Party (off. opp.), KAP, Greens	2024 (parliament)
South Australia	Multi-party	Labor Party Liberal Party (off. opp.), One Nation, Greens, FFP	2026 (parliament)
Tasmania	Multi-party	Liberal Party Labor Party (off. opp.), Greens, SFF	2025 (lower house); 2026 (upper house)
Victoria	Multi-party	Labor Party Coalition (Liberal Party, National Party) (off. opp.), Greens, LCA, AJP, LP, One Nation, SFF	2022 (parliament)
Western Australia	Multi-party	Labor Party Liberal Party, National Party (off. opp.), Greens, One Nation, AJP, AC, LCA	2025 (parliament)
Austria	Multi-party	Austrian People's Party, Social Democratic Party, NEOS Freedom Party, The Greens	2024 (legislative)
Azerbaijan	Dominant-party	New Azerbaijan Party, VHP, BAP, AVP, AMİP, ADMP, BQP ƏHD, REAL, MCP, DİP	2024 (presidential); 2024 (parliament)
Bahamas	Two-party	Progressive Liberal Party Free National Movement	2026 (general)
Bahrain	Dominant-party (Note: Independent pro-monarchy politicians dominate Bahrain's political system.)	Pro-monarchy independents, Al Rabitah, Gathering of National Unity Progressive Democratic Tribune	2022 (general)
Bangladesh	Multi-party	BNP+ (BNP, GOP, GSA, BJP) 11 Parties (BJI, NCP, BKM, KM), IAB	2026 (general)
Barbados	Two-party	Barbados Labour Party Democratic Labour Party	2026 (general)
Belarus	Dominant-party	Belaya Rus, RPTS, Communist Party Liberal Democratic Party of Belarus (Note: The Liberal Democratic Party of Belarus asserts that it is an opposition party, but supports the presidency of Alexander Lukashenko nonetheless.)	2025 (presidential); 2024 (parliament)
Belgium	Multi-party	N-VA, MR, LE, Vooruit, CD&V, LDD VB, PS, PTB-PVDA, Anders, Groen, Ecolo, DéFI	2024 (general)
Flanders	Multi-party	N-VA, Vooruit, CD&V VB, Groen, Anders, PVDA, TFA	2024 (parliament)
Wallonia	Multi-party	MR, LE PS, PTB, Ecolo	2024 (parliament)
Brussels	Multi-party	MR, PS, LE, Groen, Anders, Vooruit, CD&V PTB/PVDA, Ecolo, DéFI, TFA, N-VA, VB	2024 (parliament)
East Belgium	Multi-party	ProDG, CSP, PFF Vivant, SP, Ecolo	2024 (parliament)
Belize	Two-party	People's United Party United Democratic Party	2025 (general)
Benin	Multi-party	Progressive Union Renewal, Republican Bloc The Democrats	2021 (presidential); 2026 (parliament)
Bhutan	Two-party	People's Democratic Party Bhutan Tendrel Party	2023–24 (legislative)
Bolivia	Multi-party	PDC, Unidad, Libertad y República, APB-S Alianza Popular, MAS-IPSP, CIYBR	2025 (general)
Bosnia and Herzegovina	Multi-party	SNSD, SDP, HDZ, NiP, NS, DEMOS, US, BHI KF SDA, DF-Civic Alliance, SDS, PDP, NES, ZPR, NPD, ZNG	2022 (general)
Botswana	Multi-party	Umbrella for Democratic Change (BNF, AP, BPP), Botswana Patriotic Front Botswana Congress Party (official opposition), Botswana Democratic Party	2024 (general)
Brazil	Multi-party	Brazil of Hope (PT, PCdoB, PV), MDB, PSB, PDT, PSD, PSOL–REDE, Avante, SDD União, PP, PL, REP, PSDB–CDN, PODE, PRD, NOVO	2022 (general)
Brunei	Non-partisan	Independents (no political parties)	No elections
Bulgaria	Multi-party	Progressive Bulgaria GERB–SDS, Democratic Bulgaria, DPS, We Continue the Change, Revival	2021 (presidential); 2026 (parliament)
Burkina Faso	Military junta	Patriotic Movement for Safeguard and Restoration (civilian government suspended)	2022 coup d'état
Burundi	Dominant-party	National Council for the Defense of Democracy National Congress for Liberty, Union for National Progress	2025 (parliamentary)
Cambodia	Dominant-party	Cambodian People's Party FUNCINPEC, Khmer Will Party	2023 (parliament)
Cameroon	Dominant-party	Cameroon People's Democratic Movement, UNDP, FNSC SDF, CPNR, UDC, MDR, USM	2025 (presidential); 2020 (parliament)
Canada	Multi-party	Liberal Party Conservative Party (official opposition), Bloc Québécois, NDP, Green Party	2025 (federal)
Alberta	Multi-party	United Conservative Party New Democratic Party (official opposition), Progressive Tory Party	2023 (parliament)
British Columbia	Multi-party	New Democratic Party Conservative Party (official opposition), Green Party, OneBC	2024 (parliament)
Manitoba	Multi-party	New Democratic Party Progressive Conservative Party (official opposition), Liberal Party	2023 (parliament)
New Brunswick	Multi-party	Liberal Association Progressive Conservative Party (official opposition), Green Party	2024 (parliament)
Newfoundland and Labrador	Multi-party	Progressive Conservative Party Liberal Party (official opposition), New Democratic Party	2025 (parliament)
Northwest Territories	Non-partisan	Independents (no political parties)	2023 (parliament)
Nova Scotia	Multi-party	Progressive Conservative Party New Democratic Party (official opposition), Liberal Party	2024 (parliament)
Nunavut	Non-partisan	Independents (no political parties)	2025 (parliament)
Ontario	Multi-party	Progressive Conservative Party New Democratic Party (official opposition), Liberal Party, Green Party	2023 (parliament)
Prince Edward Island	Multi-party	Progressive Conservative Party Liberal Party (official opposition), Green Party	2023 (parliament)
Quebec	Multi-party	Coalition Avenir Québec Liberal Party (official opposition), Québec solidaire, Parti Québécois, Conservative Party	2022 (parliament)
Saskatchewan	Dominant-party	Saskatchewan Party New Democratic Party (official opposition)	2024 (parliament)
Yukon	Multi-party	Yukon Party New Democratic Party (official opposition) Liberal Party	2025 (parliament)
Cape Verde	Multi-party	Movement for Democracy PAICV (president's party), UCID	2021 (presidential); 2021 (parliament)
Central African; Republic	Dominant-party	United Hearts Movement Kwa Na Kwa, URCA, MLPC, MOUNI, RDC and others	2025 (general)
Chad	Dominant-party	Patriotic Salvation Movement RNDT, RDP, UNDR, URD, FAR, Les Transformateurs	2024 (parliament); 2024 (presidential)
Chile	Multi-party	Change for Chile (Republican Party, NLP, CSP) Unidad por Chile (Party for Democracy, SPC, Liberal Party, RPC, CPC, Frente Amplio, CDP)	2025 (general)
China (PRC)	One-party	Chinese Communist Party, minor parties (JS, CPWDP, CDL, CAPD, CNDCA, RCCK, TDSL, CZGP)	2023 (congressional)
Colombia	Multi-party	Defenders of the Homeland; Government coalition: CD, Partido de la U, PCC, CR, PLC, AV, and other parties supporting the government. Opp.: Historic Pact, Comunes, and other opposition parties. Ind.: parties that have declared themselves independent of the government.	2026 (parliament); 2026 (presidential)
Comoros	Dominant-party	Convention for the Renewal of the Comoros Party for the Reform of Institutions	2025 (parliament); 2024 (presidential)
Congo	Dominant-party	Congolese Party of Labour, MAR, Club 2002–PUR, RDPS, CPR, URDP, RC UPADS, UDH–Yuki, PRL, MUST, DRD, APC, MDP, MCDDI	2026 (presidential); 2022 (parliament)
DR Congo	Multi-party	Sacred Union of the Nation (UDPS, AA, UNC, AFDC, AB, TDC, AAAP, A/B50, MLC, AACPG, 4AC, A24, AA/C, PALU, etc.) Together for the Republic, Avançons-MS, NOU.EL, DYPRO, LGD	2023 (general); 2024 (senate)
Costa Rica	Multi-party	Sovereign People's Party PLN, Broad Front, PAC, PUSC	2026 (general)
Croatia	Multi-party	Croatian Democratic Union, DP, HSLS, HNS, N–HSU, HDS SDP, Možemo!, Most, Centar–NPS, DOMiNO–HS, HSS–GLAS–DO i SIP, SDSS, IDS-DDI	2024–25 (presidential); 2024 (parliament)
Cuba	One-party	Communist Party of Cuba	2023 (parliament)
Cyprus	Multi-party	Democratic Party, Democratic Alignment, EDEK (minority) Democratic Rally, AKEL, ELAM, KOSP, Volt, DEK	2023 (presidential); 2021 (legislative)
Czech Republic	Multi-party	ANO, SPD, AUTO SPOLU, STAN, CPS	2025 (parliament); 2023 (presidential)
Denmark	Multi-party	Social Democrats, Venstre, Moderates, Union Party, Jf, IA, Naleraq Denmark Democrats, SF, LA, DKF, EL, DF, RV, Alternative, BP	2026 (general)
Djibouti	Dominant-party	Union for the Presidential Majority (RPP, FRUD, PND, PSD, UPR) Djibouti Union for Democracy and Justice	2021 (presidential); 2023 (parliament)
Dominica	Dominant-party	Dominica Labour Party No parliamentary opposition; Team Unity Dominica, United Workers' Party	2022 (general)
Dominican Republic	Multi-party	Modern Revolutionary Party, PRSC, PRSD, DxC, PLR. PNVC, PCR, ALPAÍS, APD, PPG, PRI People's Force, Dominican Liberation Party, PRD, PQDC, PSC	2024 (general)
Timor-Leste	Multi-party	National Congress for Timorese Reconstruction, Democratic Party FRETILIN, KHUNTO, People's Liberation Party	2023 (parliament); 2022 (presidential)
Ecuador	Multi-party	National Democratic Action, PSP, Construye RC, Pachakutik, PSC, RETO, Popular Unity	2025 (general)
Egypt	Dominant-party	Nation's Future Party, HDP, NFP, RPP, New Wafd, Al-Nour Party, Congress Party, WGP, EFP, Consciousness Party ESDP, RDP, Justice, NPURP, Conservative Party	2023 (presidential); 2025 (parliament); 2025 (senate)
El Salvador	Dominant-party	Nuevas Ideas, National Coalition Party, Christian Democratic Party Nationalist Republican Alliance, Vamos	2024 (presidential); 2024 (legislative)
Equatorial Guinea	Dominant-party	Democratic Party of Equatorial Guinea No parliamentary opposition, Convergence for Social Democracy	2022 (general)
Eritrea	One-party	People's Front for Democracy and Justice	Elections postponed
Estonia	Multi-party	Reform Party, Estonia 200 Social Democratic Party, Isamaa, EKRE, Centre Party, ERK	2023 (parliament)
Eswatini	Non-partisan	Independents (no political parties)	2023 (general)
Ethiopia	Dominant-party	Prosperity Party NaMA, EZEMA, GPDP, WPLM	2021 (general)
Fiji	Multi-party	People's Alliance, National Federation Party, SODELPA Independents (Ex-FijiFirst)	2022 (general)
Finland	Multi-party	Kokoomus, Finns, Swedish People's Party, KD SDP, Centre Party, The Greens, Left Alliance, Movement Now	2023 (parliament); 2024 (presidential)
France	Multi-party	Ensemble (RE, MoDem, HOR, UDI, PR, EC), LR, LC, AC NFP (LFI, PS, LÉ, PCF, PP, REV, GRS), UXD (RN, UDR, IDL), R&PS	2022 (presidential); 2024 (legislative)
Gabon	Dominant-party	Rally of Builders Ensemble pour le Gabon,Gabonese Patriotic Party,Large Rassemblement Arc-en-ciel	2025 (presidential)
Gambia	Multi-party	National People's Party, National Reconciliation Party, APRC United Democratic Party, PDOIS	2021 (presidential); 2022 (parliament)
Georgia	Dominant-party	Georgian Dream, People's Power CfC (Ahali, Girchi–MF, Droa, Rep), U–NM (UNM, SA, EG, P&F), SG (Lelo, FtP, Citizens, FS), FG, CPG	2024 (parliament)
Germany	Multi-party	Union (CDU, CSU), Social Democratic Party Alternative for Germany, Greens, Die Linke, SSW	2025 (federal)
Ghana	Two-party	National Democratic Congress New Patriotic Party	2024 (general)
Greece	Multi-party	New Democracy PASOK–KINAL (PASOK, KIDISO), Syriza, KKE, Greek Solution, NA, Niki, Course of Freedom, Spartans	2023 (legislative)
Grenada	Two-party	National Democratic Congress New National Party	2022 (general)
Guatemala	Multi-party	Semilla, Winaq–URNG Vamos, UNE, Cabal, ViVa, Valor, VOS, Todos, PPN, BIEN, Victoria, PA, CE, CREO, Cambio	2023 (general)
Guinea	Dominant-party	Generation for Modernity and Development No parliamentary opposition	2025 (presidential); 2026 (parliament)
Guinea-Bissau	Military junta	HMCRNSPO (civilian government suspended)	2025 coup d'état
Guyana	Multi-party	People's Progressive Party/Civic WIN, APNU (PNCR and others), FG	2025 (general)
Haiti	Transitional government	Transitional non-partisan government; TPC member parties: FL, OPL, PPD, EDE, REN Parliament dissolved; PHTK, Inite, Haiti in Action, RDNP, Renmen, UNCRH, PFSDH	2016–17 (senate); 2016 (presidential)
Honduras	Multi-party	National Liberal, Libre, INU, CDP	2025 (general)
Hungary	Multi-party	Tisza Party Fidesz–KDNP (Fidesz, KDNP), Mi Hazánk	2026 (parliament)
Iceland	Multi-party	Samfylkingin, Viðreisn, People's Party Independence Party, Centre Party, Progressive Party	2024 (parliament); 2024 (presidential)
India	Multi-party	NDA (BJP, AIADMK, TDP, JD(U), SHS, LJP(RV), JD(S), JSP, RLD, AD(S), AGP, AJSU, HAM(S), NCP, SKM, UPPL) INDIA (INC, SP, AITC, DMK, SS(UBT), NCP(SP), CPI(M), RJD, AAP, IUML, JMM, CPI, CPI(ML)L, JKNC, VCK, BAP, RSP, VPP, KEC, MDMK, RLP); Others (YSRCP, AD(WPD), SAD, ASP(KR), AIMIM, ZPM, BSP, BRS, AIUDF, RLP)	2024 (general)
Indonesia	Multi-party	KIM Plus (Gerindra, Golkar, PKB, PAN, Demokrat), PDI-P, NasDem, PKS	2024 (general)
Iran	Two-party (Note: Iran's parties must adhere to a religious system of governance.)	Reformists (executive majority) Principlists (legislative, judicial, and oversight majority)	2024 (presidential); 2024 (legislative)
Iraq	Multi-party	Takadum, State of Law, PDK, Fatah, Kurdistan Alliance, Azem, Victory Alliance, Babylon, Furatayn Emtidad, NGM, National Contract, Tasmim, Ishraqat Kanoon, NPI, MDR, others	2025 (parliament)
Kurdistan	Multi-party	Kurdistan Democratic Party, Patriotic Union of Kurdistan Gorran, Naway Nwe, Kurdistan Justice Group, Yekgirtû	2024 (parliament)
Ireland	Multi-party	Fianna Fáil, Fine Gael Sinn Féin, Labour Party, Social Democrats, PBP–S, Green Party, 100% Redress, Independent Ireland, Aontú	2024 (general)
Israel	Multi-party	Likud, Shas, Religious Zionist Party, UTJ, Otzma, New Hope Yesh Atid, National Unity, Yisrael Beiteinu, Ra'am, Hadash–Ta'al, Democrats, Noam	2022 (legislative)
Italy	Multi-party	Brothers of Italy, League, Forza Italia, Us Moderates, MAIE, DCR, UdC PD–IDP (PD, DemoS, CD), M5S, Az, AVS (EV, SI, PP), IV, +E, SVP, ScN, UV	2022 (general)
Ivory Coast	Dominant-party	Rally of Houphouëtists for Democracy and Peace (RDR) PDCI-RDA, Together for Democracy and Sovereignty, UDPCI, FPI	2025 (presidential); 2025 (parliament)
Jamaica	Two-party	Jamaica Labour Party People's National Party	2025 (general)
Japan	Multi-party	Liberal Democratic Party, Ishin Centrist Reform Alliance, (Constitutional Democratic Party, Komeito), DPP, Mirai, Party of Life, Communist Party, Sanseitō, CPJ, SDP	2026 (general); 2025 (upper house)
Jordan	Dominant-party (Note: Independent pro-monarchy politicians dominate Jordan's political system.)	Pro-monarchy independents, National Charter Party, Eradah Party, Progress Party Islamic Action Front, National Islamic Party, National Union Movement, Communist Party	2024 (general)
Kazakhstan	Dominant-party	Amanat Auyl, Respublica, Aq Jol, People's Party, JSDP	2022 (presidential); 2023 (legislative)
Kenya	Multi-party	Kenya Kwanza (UDA, ANC, FORD–K, UDM, TSP, MCC, UPIA, UPA, CCK, DP, GDDP, MDG) Azimio (ODM, Jubilee, WDM–K, DAP–K, KANU, KUP, NOPEU, NAP–K, UDP)	2022 (general)
Kiribati	Two-party	Tobwaan Kiribati Party Boutokaan Kiribati Moa Party	2024 (parliament); 2024 (presidential)
Korea (DPRK)	One-party	Workers' Party of Korea, other minor parties (KSDP, Chondoist Chongu Party)	2026 (parliament)
Korea (ROK)	Multi-party	Democratic Party People Power Party, Rebuilding Korea, New Reform, Progressive Party, BIP, SDP	2025 (presidential); 2024 (legislative)
Kuwait	Non-partisan	Independents (no political parties)	2024 (general)
Kyrgyzstan	Multi-party	Mekenchil, Ata-Jurt Kyrgyzstan, Ishenim, Yntymak Eldik, Alliance, United Kyrgyzstan, Light of Faith, SDK, Afghans' Party	2021 (presidential); 2025 (parliament)
Laos	One-party	Lao People's Revolutionary Party	2026 (parliament)
Latvia	Multi-party	New Unity, Union of Greens and Farmers, The Progressives United List, National Alliance, For Stability!, Latvia First	2022 (parliament)
Lebanon	Multi-party	Acting gov't: FPM, Amal, Hezbollah, PSP, Marada, ARF, Al-Ahbash, Ba'ath, UP, JI LF, Kataeb, Taqaddom, Al Haraka, Tahalof Watani, ReLebanon, Khatt Ahmar, Lana, Osos, NDP, PNO	2022 (general)
Lesotho	Multi-party	Revolution for Prosperity, BAP, AD, MEC, LCD, LPC, HOPE Democratic Congress, ABC, SR, BNP, PFD, BCM, MPS, NIP, UFC, BPP	2022 (general)
Liberia	Two-party	Unity Party Congress for Democratic Change, other small parties	2023 (general)
Libya	Non-partisan	Government of National Unity, Government of National Stability Independents	2014 (parliament)
Liechtenstein	Multi-party	Patriotic Union, Progressive Citizens' Party Free List, Democrats for Liechtenstein	2025 (general)
Lithuania	Multi-party	LSDP, Dawn of Nemunas, DSVL TS–LKD, LS, LVŽS, DP, LLRA–KŠS, NS, Freedom and Justice	2024 (parliament); 2024 (presidential)
Luxembourg	Multi-party	Christian Social People's Party, Democratic Party LSAP, ADR, The Greens, Pirate Party, The Left	2023 (general)
Madagascar	Military junta	CAPSAT (civilian government suspended)	2025 Malagasy coup d'état
Malawi	Multi-party	Democratic Progressive Party, independents MCP, UTM, UDF, AFORD, People's Party	2025 (general)
Malaysia	Multi-party	PH (PKR, DAP, Amanah, UPKO), BN (UMNO, MCA, MIC, PBRS), GPS (PBB, PRS, PDP, SUPP), GRS (GAGASAN RAKYAT, PBS, STAR, PHRS, USNO, LDP-Sabah, SAPP, PCS), Warisan, KDM, PBM PN (PAS, BERSATU, MIPP, GERAKAN RAKYAT), MUDA	2022 (general)
Maldives	Multi-party	People's National Congress Maldivian Democratic Party, MDA, Jumhooree Party, MNP, Adhaalath Party, MLSDP	2023 (presidential); 2024 (parliament)
Mali	Military junta	Malian Armed Forces (civilian government suspended)	2021 coup d'état
Malta	Two-party	Labour Party Nationalist Party	2022 (general)
Marshall Islands	Two-party	Independents (Pro-Heine) Independents (Pro-Kabua)	2023 (general)
Mauritania	Multi-party	Equity Party, AND, El Islah, UDP, El Karama, Nida El Watan, HATEM, HIWAR, El Vadila Tewassoul, Hope Mauritania, Sawab–RAG, AJD/MR, State of Justice	2024 (presidential); 2023 (parliament)
Mauritius	Multi-party	Alliance du Changement (Labour Party, MMM, New Democrats, ReA), OPR, Alliance Liberation Militant Socialist Movement, Social Democratic Party	2024 (general)
Mexico	Multi-party	Morena, Ecologist Green Party, Labor Party National Action Party, Institutional Revolutionary Party, Citizens' Movement	2024 (general)
Micronesia	Non-partisan	Independents (no political parties)	2025 (general)
Moldova	Multi-party	Party of Action and Solidarity Bloc of Communists and Socialists (PSRM, PCRM), Victory (ȘOR–Independents, Revival), MAN	2025 (parliament); 2024 (presidential)
Monaco	Multi-party	UNM (Priorité Monaco, Horizon Monaco, Union Monégasque) No parliamentary opposition; New Ideas for Monaco	2023 (parliament)
Mongolia	Multi-party	Mongolian People's Party, Democratic Party, HUN Party National Coalition (Green Party, MNDP, MLDP), Civil Will–Green Party	2021 (presidential); 2024 (legislative)
Montenegro	Multi-party	Europe Now, ZBCG (NSD, DNP), Democrats, BS, SNP, ASh, UCG, Civic, LDSh, FORCA, UDSh Democratic Party of Socialists, United Reform Action, Social Democrats, HGI	2023 (presidential); 2023 (legislative)
Morocco	Multi-party	National Rally of Independents, Authenticity and Modernity Party, Istiqlal Party Socialist Union of Popular Forces, Popular Movement, UC–MDS, PPS, PJD, FFD, PSU, AFG	2021 (general)
Mozambique	Dominant-party	FRELIMO PODEMOS, RENAMO, MDM	2024 (general)
Myanmar	Dominant-party	USDP, PPP, NDF, KPP, PNO, ZCD, MUP	2025–26 (general)
Namibia	Dominant-party	SWAPO IPC, AR, PDM, LPM, UDF, NEFF, SWANU, RP, NUDO, APP, NDP, BCP	2024 (general)
Nauru	Non-partisan	Independents (no political parties)	2025 (parliament)
Nepal	Multi-party	Rastriya Swatantra Party Congress, CPN (UML), NCP, SSP, RPP	2026 (general)
Netherlands	Multi-party	D66, CDA, VVD, GL/PvdA, PVV, BBB, SP, FvD, PvdD, SGP, CU, DENK, Volt, JA21, 50PLUS, OPNL	2025 (general)
New Zealand	Multi-party	National Party, ACT New Zealand, New Zealand First Labour Party (official opposition), Green Party, Te Pāti Māori	2023 (general)
Nicaragua	Dominant-party	Sandinista National Liberation Front, YATAMA Constitutionalist Liberal Party, ALN, PLI, CCN, APRE	2021 (general)
Niger	Military junta	CSNP (civilian government suspended), M62 Movement	2023 coup d'état
Nigeria	Multi-party	All Progressives Congress Peoples Democratic Party (official opposition), Labour Party, NNPP, APGA, ADC, SDP, YPP, ADP	2023 (general)
North Macedonia	Multi-party	Your Macedonia (VMRO-DPMNE, SPM, DPSM), VLEN (ASh, Besa, LD, AAA, LVV), ZNAM For a European Future (SDSM, NSDP, LDP), European Front (BDI, ASh, LP, TDP, THDH), Levica, PDSh	2024 (presidential); 2024 (parliament)
Norway	Multi-party	Labour Party, Centre Party Conservative Party, FrP, SV, Liberal Party, Red Party, KrF, Green Party, Patient Focus	2025 (parliament)
Oman	Non-partisan	Independents (no political parties)	2023 (general)
Pakistan	Multi-party	PMLN, MQM-P, PML (Q), IPP, PPP, BAP, NP, PML-Z, ANP Tehreek Tahafuz Ayin (PTI, SIC, BNP-M, MWM, PMAP JI, JUI (F)), TLP), AP),	2024 (general)
Palau	Non-partisan	Independents (no political parties)	2024 (general)
Panama	Multi-party	Realizing Goals, Alliance Party, PRD, CD, Panameñista, MOLIRENA, PP Coalición Vamos, Another Way Movement	2024 (general)
Papua New Guinea	Multi-party	Pangu, URP, NA, People's, SDP, PFP, PNGP, ULP, Advance, National, AP, Green, Liberal, MAP, NGP, ODP, PLP, PMC, PPP, PRP, Destiny, THE People's National Congress Party	2022 (general)
Paraguay	Dominant-party	Colorado Party Authentic Radical Liberal Party, National Crusade, Yo Creo, PEN, PPQ, PPS, Guasú Front, PDP	2023 (general)
Peru	Multi-party	Popular Force (FP) Gov.: FP; Opp.: Juntos por el Perú (JP), Party of Good Government, Popular Renewal, Civic Party OBRAS, Now Nation	2026 (general)
Philippines	Multi-party	Alyansa para sa Bagong Pilipinas (PFP, Lakas–CMD, NUP, NPC, Nacionalista) PDP, Liberal Party, Akbayan, KNP, LDP, PMP, PRP, UNA, CDP, Aksyon, Makabayan (ACT Teachers, Kabataan)	2025 (general)
Poland	Multi-party	KO (PO, .N, IPL, PZ, T!DPL, AU, Ip), TD (KP, PL2050, CdP, Ip), The Left (NL, UP, PPS, Ip) United Right (PiS, OdNowa RP, Ip), Confederation (NN, RN, Ip), Razem, Free Republicans, (Kukiz'15, WiD), Confederation of the Polish Crown	2025 (presidential); 2023 (parliament)
Portugal	Multi-party	Democratic Alliance (Social Democratic Party, CDS – People's Party) Chega, Socialist Party, IL, LIVRE, PCP, Left Bloc, PAN	2025 (parliament); 2026 (presidential)
Qatar	Non-partisan	Independents (no political parties)	2021 (general)
Romania	Multi-party	PNL, USR, UDMR/RMDSZ, Ethnic minority parties PSD, AUR, SOS RO, POT	2025 (presidential); 2024 (legislative)
Russia	Dominant-party	United Russia, LDPR (incl. Rodina and Civic Platform), A Just Russia – For Truth Communist Party (incl. DPA, DNZS and Left Front), New People	2024 (presidential); 2021 (legislative)
Rwanda	Dominant-party	Rwandan Patriotic Front Liberal Party, Social Democratic Party, Ideal Democratic Party, DGPR, PSI	2024 (general)
Saint Kitts and Nevis	Multi-party	Saint Kitts and Nevis Labour Party Concerned Citizens' Movement, People's Labour Party, People's Action Movement	2022 (general)
Saint Lucia	Two-party	Saint Lucia Labour Party United Workers Party	2025 (general)
Saint Vincent and the Grenadines	Two-party	New Democratic Party Unity Labour Party	2025 (general)
Samoa	Two-party	Faʻatuatua i le Atua Samoa ua Tasi Human Rights Protection Party, Samoa Uniting Party	2025 (general)
San Marino	Multi-party	Sammarinese Christian Democratic Party, Libera–PS, PSD, Reformist Alliance Future Republic, Domani Motus Liberi, RETE Movement	2024 (general)
São Tomé and Príncipe	Multi-party	Independent Democratic Action MLSTP/PSD, MCI/PS-PUN, Basta	2021 (presidential); 2022 (legislative)
Saudi Arabia	Non-partisan	Independents (no political parties)	No elections
Senegal	Multi-party	PASTEF Takku Wallu Sénégal (APR, PDS, Rewmi, BGG), Jàmm ak Njariñ (NR, PS), Sàmm Sa Kàddu (MTS, PUR, ARC), Andu Nawlé	2024 (presidential); 2024 (legislative)
Serbia	Dominant-party	SNS coalition (SPS, PS, SNP, SPO, NSS, SSD), SPS, PUPS, SDPS, SPP, SPO, DSHV, VMSZ, JS, ZS–USS–RS, Zeleni PSS, NPS–NLS, NADA (NDSS, POKS), ZLF, SRCE, DS, MI–GIN, MI–SN, EU, PSG–SDAS–PVD, USS Sloga	2026 (legislative); 2022 (general)
Seychelles	Two-party	United Seychelles Linyon Demokratik Seselwa	2025 (general)
Sierra Leone	Two-party	Sierra Leone People's Party All People's Congress	2023 (general)
Singapore	Dominant-party	People's Action Party Workers' Party, Progress Singapore Party	2025 (general)
Slovakia	Multi-party	Smer, Hlas, Slovak National Party, NK/NEKA Progressive Slovakia, S–KÚ–ZĽ–NOVA, SaS (incl. OKS), KDH, Democrats	2023 (parliament); 2024 (presidential)
Slovenia	Multi-party	Slovenian Democratic Party, New Slovenia, Democrats Freedom Movement, Social Democrats, The Left, Resni.ca	2026 (parliament); 2022 (presidential)
Solomon Islands	Multi-party	OUR Party, People First Party, Kadere Party, pro-government independents Democratic Party, United Party, Party for Rural Advancement, Umi for Change, Democratic Alliance Party	2024 (general)
Somalia	Multi-party	Union for Peace and Development Party Tayo, Himilo Qaran, Kaah, Wadajir, Ilays	2021–22 (parliament); 2022 (presidential)
South Africa	Multi-party	African National Congress, Democratic Alliance, IFP, PA, VF+, UDM, Al Jama-ah, Good, PAC, RISE Progressive Caucus (MK Party, EFF, ATM, UAT), ActionSA, ACDP, BOSA, NCC	2024 (general)
South Sudan	Dominant-party	Sudan People's Liberation Movement SPLM-in-Opposition, South Sudan Opposition Alliance	2010 (general)
Spain	Multi-party	PSOE, Sumar (MS, IU, Podemos, CatComú, MM, Compromís, CHA, Més), ERC, EH Bildu, EAJ/PNV, Junts, BNG, CCa People's Party, Vox, UPN	2023 (general)
Andalusia	Multi-party	People's Party, Vox PSOE-A, AA, Por Andalucía (IULV-CA, MS)	2026 (parliament)
Aragon	Multi-party	People's Party, Vox PSOE-Aragón, CHA, Teruel Existe, IUA	2026 (parliament)
Asturias	Multi-party	FSA-PSOE, Assembly for Asturias (IU-IX, MS) People's Party, Vox, Foro	2023 (parliament)
Balearic Islands	Multi-party	PSIB, Sa Unió Vox, Més, MxMe, Podemos	2023 (parliament)
Basque Country	Dominant-party	EAJ-PNV, PSE-EE EH Bildu (Sortu, EA, Alternatiba), People's Party, Sumar (EzAn-IU), Vox	2024 (parliament)
Canary Islands	Multi-party	Canarian Coalition, People's Party, ASG, AHI PSC-PSOE, NC-BC, Vox	2023 (parliament)
Cantabria	Multi-party	People's Party PRC, PSC-PSOE, Vox	2026 (parliament)
Castile and León	Dominant-party	People's Party, Vox PSCyL, UPL, Soria ¡Ya!, XAV	2023 (parliament)
Castilla–La Mancha	Dominant-party	PSCM-PSOE People's Party, Vox	2023 (parliament)
Catalonia	Multi-party	PSC, Units, ERC, Comuns Sumar (CatComú, MS) Junts, People's Party, Vox, CUP, AC	2024 (parliament)
Ceuta	Multi-party	People's Party PSOE, Vox, MDyC, Ceuta Ya!	2023 (parliament)
Extremadura	Multi-party	People's Party, Vox PSOE-E, Unidas por Extremadura (IU, Podemos)	2025 (parliament)
Galicia	Dominant-party	People's Party BNG, PSdeG-PSOE, DO	2024 (parliament)
La Rioja	Multi-party	People's Party PSOE La Rioja, Vox, Podemos, IU-La Rioja	2023 (parliament)
Madrid	Dominant-party	People's Party PSOE-M, Más Madrid, Vox	2023 (parliament)
Melilla	Multi-party	People's Party CpM, PSOE, Vox, SML	2023 (parliament)
Murcia	Multi-party	People's Party PSRM-PSOE, Vox, Podemos, IU-V-RM	2023 (parliament)
Navarre	Multi-party	PSN-PSOE, Geroa Bai (GSB-GSV, EAJ-PNV), Contigo Navarra (Podemos, IUN-NEB) UPN, EH Bildu, People's Party, Vox	2023 (parliament)
Valencian Community	Multi-party	People's Party PSPV-PSOE, Coalició Compromís (Més–Compromís, IdPV, VerdsEquo), Vox	2023 (parliament)
Sri Lanka	Multi-party	NPP (Janatha Vimukthi Peramuna) Samagi Jana Balawegaya, ITAK, NDF, SLPP, SLMC, SB, DTNA, ACTC, SLLP	2024 (presidential); 2024 (parliament)
Sudan	Military junta	Ongoing war between the Transitional Sovereignty Council and Government of Peace and Unity Parliament dissolved, Forces of Freedom and Change, SPLM–N (al-Hilu), SLM (al-Nur)	Transition to democracy See also: Civil war
Suriname	Multi-party	National Democratic Party, ABOP, NPS, Pertjajah Luhur, BEP, A20 Progressive Reform Party	2025 (general)
Sweden	Multi-party	Moderate Party, Christian Democrats, Liberals, Sweden Democrats Social Democratic Party, Left Party, Centre Party, Green Party	2022 (general)
Switzerland	Multi-party	Swiss People's Party, Social Democratic Party, FDP.The Liberals, The Centre Green Party, Green Liberal Party, Evangelical People's Party, Federal Democratic Union, Ticino League, MCG	2023 (general)
Syria	Provisional government	Syrian transitional government Independents (no political parties; de jure) (Note: Since the fall of the Assad regime, no legislation regulating political parties has been enacted by the People's Assembly or the Syrian transitional government. However, there have been reports and discussions that President Ahmed al-Sharaa and his advisers are considering the formation of a new political party.) KDPS, KDUP, KDEP, ADO, MJDS, STA, MBS (affiliated members; de facto) (Note: Not considered an official party designation within the People's Assembly.)	2025 (parliament)
Tajikistan	Dominant-party	People's Democratic Party, Agrarian Party, Communist Party Party of Economic Reforms, Democratic Party, Socialist Party	2020 (presidential); 2025 (parliament)
Tanzania	Dominant-party	Chama Cha Mapinduzi Chadema, ACT–Wazalendo, Civic United Front	2025 (general)
Zanzibar	Dominant-party	Chama Cha Mapinduzi ACT–Wazalendo, ADC, AFP, TADEA	2025 (general)
Thailand	Multi-party	PTP, BJT, UTN, DP, CTP, Prachachat, Kla Tham, CPP, TRP, PPRP–T, NDP People's Party, PPRP–P, TST, FP, TPP, TLP	2023 (general)
Togo	Dominant-party	Union for the Republic ADDI, ANC, DMP, FDR	2025 (presidential); 2024 (parliament)
Tonga	Two-party	Independents Opposition independents	2025 (general)
Trinidad and Tobago	Two-party	United National Congress People's National Movement, Tobago People's Party	2025 (general)
Tobago	Two-party	Tobago People's Party Progressive Democratic Patriots, Tobago Council of the PNM	2021 (legislative)
Tunisia	Dominant-party	Non-partisan government; 25th of July Movement, Voice of the Republic People's Movement, Democratic Patriots' Unified Party	2024 (president); 2022–23 (parliament)
Turkey	Multi-party	Justice and Development Party, Nationalist Movement Party, HÜDA PAR, DSP CHP, DEM, İYİ, Saadet–Gelecek, DEVA, YRP, DP, TİP, DBP, EMEP	2023 (president); 2023 (parliament)
Turkmenistan	Dominant-party	Democratic Party of Turkmenistan, Agrarian Party, TSTP No parliamentary opposition	2023 (parliament); 2022 (presidential)
Tuvalu	Non-partisan	Independents (no political parties)	2024 (general)
Uganda	Dominant-party	National Resistance Movement National Unity Platform, FDC, Democratic Party, UPC, Justice Forum, PPP	2026 (general)
Ukraine	Multi-party	Servant of the People, Platform for Life and Peace, For the Future, Dovira European Solidarity, Batkivshchyna, Holos, Restoration of Ukraine, Svoboda	2019 (president); 2019 (parliament)
United Arab; Emirates	Non-partisan	Independents (no political parties)	2023 (parliament)
United Kingdom	Multi-party	Labour Party (incl. Labour Co-op) Conservative Party (opposition), Lib Dems, SNP, Sinn Féin, IA, Reform UK, GPEW, Plaid, SDLP, Alliance, TUV, UUP, Your	2024 (general)
Northern Ireland	Multi-party	Sinn Féin, DUP, Alliance, UUP SDLP, TUV, People Before Profit	2022 (parliament)
Scotland	Multi-party	Scottish National Party Scottish Labour, Reform UK Scotland, Scottish Greens, Scottish Conservatives, Scottish Liberal Democrats	2026 (parliament)
Wales	Multi-party	Plaid Cymru Reform UK Wales, Welsh Labour, Welsh Conservatives, Wales Green Party, Welsh Liberal Democrats	2026 (parliament)
United States	Two-party	Republican Party Democratic Party	2024 (general)
Alabama	Two-party	Republican Party Democratic Party	2022 (general)
Alaska	Two-party	Republican Party (majority coalition caucus), Democratic Party Republican Party (non-caucusing)	2022 (gubernatorial); 2024 (legislative)
Arizona	Two-party	Democratic Party Republican Party	2022 (gubernatorial); 2024 (legislative)
Arkansas	Two-party	Republican Party Democratic Party	2022 (gubernatorial); 2024 (legislative)
California	Two-party	Democratic Party Republican Party	2022 (gubernatorial); 2024 (legislative)
Colorado	Two-party	Democratic Party Republican Party	2022 (gubernatorial); 2024 (legislative)
Connecticut	Two-party	Democratic Party Republican Party	2022 (gubernatorial); 2024 (legislative)
Delaware	Two-party	Democratic Party Republican Party	2024 (general)
Florida	Two-party	Republican Party Democratic Party	2022 (gubernatorial); 2024 (legislative)
Georgia	Two-party	Republican Party Democratic Party	2022 (gubernatorial); 2024 (legislative)
Hawaii	Two-party	Democratic Party Republican Party	2022 (gubernatorial); 2024 (legislative)
Idaho	Two-party	Republican Party Democratic Party	2022 (gubernatorial); 2024 (legislative)
Illinois	Two-party	Democratic Party Republican Party	2022 (gubernatorial); 2024 (legislative)
Indiana	Two-party	Republican Party Democratic Party	2024 (general)
Iowa	Two-party	Republican Party Democratic Party	2022 (gubernatorial); 2024 (legislative)
Kansas	Two-party	Democratic Party Republican Party	2022 (gubernatorial); 2024 (legislative)
Kentucky	Two-party	Democratic Party Republican Party	2023 (gubernatorial); 2024 (legislative)
Louisiana	Two-party	Republican Party Democratic Party	2023 (general)
Maine	Two-party	Democratic Party Republican Party	2022 (gubernatorial); 2024 (legislative)
Maryland	Two-party	Democratic Party Republican Party	2022 (general)
Massachusetts	Two-party	Democratic Party Republican Party	2022 (gubernatorial); 2024 (legislative)
Michigan	Two-party	Democratic Party Republican Party	2022 (gubernatorial); 2024 (lower house); 2022 (upper house)
Minnesota	Two-party	Democratic-Farmer-Labor Party Republican Party	2022 (gubernatorial); 2024 (lower house); 2022 (upper house)
Mississippi	Two-party	Republican Party Democratic Party	2023 (general)
Missouri	Two-party	Republican Party Democratic Party	2024 (general)
Montana	Two-party	Republican Party Democratic Party	2024 (general)
Nebraska	Two-party	Republican Party Democratic Party	2022 (gubernatorial); 2024 (legislative)
Nevada	Two-party	Republican Party Democratic Party	2022 (gubernatorial); 2024 (legislative)
New Hampshire	Two-party	Republican Party Democratic Party	2024 (general)
New Jersey	Two-party	Democratic Party Republican Party	2025 (gubernatorial); 2025 (lower house); 2023 (upper house)
New Mexico	Two-party	Democratic Party Republican Party	2022 (gubernatorial); 2024 (legislative)
New York	Two-party	Democratic Party Republican Party	2022 (general)
North Carolina	Two-party	Democratic Party Republican Party	2024 (general)
North Dakota	Two-party	Republican Party Democratic-Nonpartisan League Party	2024 (general)
Ohio	Two-party	Republican Party Democratic Party	2022 (gubernatorial); 2024 (legislative)
Oklahoma	Two-party	Republican Party Democratic Party	2022 (gubernatorial); 2024 (legislative)
Oregon	Two-party	Democratic Party Republican Party	2022 (gubernatorial); 2024 (legislative)
Pennsylvania	Two-party	Democratic Party Republican Party	2022 (gubernatorial); 2024 (legislative)
Rhode Island	Two-party	Democratic Party Republican Party	2022 (gubernatorial); 2024 (legislative)
South Carolina	Two-party	Republican Party Democratic Party	2022 (gubernatorial); 2024 (legislative)
South Dakota	Two-party	Republican Party Democratic Party	2022 (gubernatorial); 2024 (legislative)
Tennessee	Two-party	Republican Party Democratic Party	2022 (gubernatorial); 2024 (legislative)
Texas	Two-party	Republican Party Democratic Party	2022 (gubernatorial); 2024 (legislative)
Utah	Multi-party	Republican Party Democratic Party, Forward Party	2024 (general)
Vermont	Multi-party	Republican Party Democratic Party, Progressive Party	2024 (general)
Virginia	Two-party	Democratic Party Republican Party	2025 (gubernatorial); 2025 (lower house); 2023 (upper house)
Washington	Two-party	Democratic Party Republican Party	2024 (general)
West Virginia	Two-party	Republican Party Democratic Party	2024 (general)
Wisconsin	Two-party	Democratic Party Republican Party	2022 (gubernatorial); 2024 (legislative)
Wyoming	Two-party	Republican Party Democratic Party	2022 (gubernatorial); 2024 (legislative)
Uruguay	Multi-party	Broad Front Republican Coalition (PN, PC, CA, PI), Sovereign Identity	2024 (general)
Uzbekistan	Dominant-party (Note: All registered parties in Uzbekistan are not in opposition to the current government of President Shavkat Mirziyoyev)	Democratic bloc (Liberal Democratic Party, Milliy Tiklanish) People's Democratic Party, Adolat, Ecological Party	2023 (presidential); 2024 (parliament)
Vanuatu	Multi-party	LPV, Iauko Group, Vanua'aku Pati, GJP, RMC UMP, RDP, Laverwo, PPP, Nagriamel, NCM, VPDP	2025 (general)
Vatican City	Non-partisan	Independents (no political parties)	2025 (papal conclave)
Venezuela	Dominant-party	GPPSB (PSUV, PPT, Tupamaro, MSV, PODEMOS, APC, MEP, ORA, UPP) PUD (AD, Copei, UNT, VP, PJ, MPV, Convergencia, EC, La Causa Я, PRVZL	2020 (parliament); 2024 (presidential)
Vietnam	One-party	Communist Party of Vietnam, Fatherland Front	2026 (parliament)
Yemen	Dominant-party	General People's Congress (Note: Competing factions of the General People's Congress are in charge of different parts of the country in the course of the ongoing civil war. In North Yemen, the Houthi movement-aligned faction loyal to party founder Ali Abdullah Saleh only partially shares power with the movement.) Al-Islah, Yemeni Socialist Party, Nasserist Unionist People's Organisation, Ba'ath Party	2012 (presidential); 2003 (parliament); See also 2014–2015 takeover
Zambia	Multi-party	United Party for National Development Patriotic Front, Party of National Unity and Progress	2021 (general)
Zimbabwe	Dominant-party	ZANU–PF Citizens Coalition for Change	2023 (general)

== Dependencies and subnational territories ==
Country	Territory	Party system	Ruling party or coalition Other parties	Last election
China	Hong Kong	Dominant-party	Pro-Beijing camp (DAB, FTU, BPA, NPP, LP, FEW, FLU, Roundtable, PP, KWND, NP, NCF) Third Side, Pro-democracy camp	2025 (legislative); 2023 (local)
China	Macau	Dominant-party	Pro-Beijing camp (ACUM, UPD, UMG, UPP, ABL) Pro-democracy camp (NE), Synergy Power	2025 (legislative)
Denmark	Faroe Islands	Multi-party	People's Party, Union Party, Social Democratic Party Republic, Progress, Centre Party, Sjálvstýri	2026 (general)
Denmark	Greenland	Multi-party	Democrats, Inuit Ataqatigiit, Siumut, Atassut Naleraq	2025 (general)
Finland	Åland	Multi-party	Liberals, Centre, Social Democrats ObS, Moderate Coalition, Sustainable Initiative	2023 (legislative)
France	French Guiana	Multi-party	DVG, Péyi Guyane, La France Insoumise, MDES, Socialist Party DVC, Guiana Rally, The Republicans	2021 (regional)
France	French Polynesia	Multi-party	Tāvini Huiraʻatira Tāpura Huiraʻatira, A here ia Porinetia, ʻĀmuitahiraʻa o te Nūnaʻa Māʻohi	2023 (legislative)
France	Guadeloupe	Multi-party	GUSR, DVC Plural Left	2021 (regional)
France	Martinique	Multi-party	PPM, Péyi-A-RDM, DVG The Republicans, DVD, FSM	2021 (regional)
France	Mayotte	Multi-party	The Republicans, NÉMA, DVD MDM, Renaissance, DVC	2021 (legislative)
France	New Caledonia	Multi-party	Caledonian Union, FLNKS, L'EO, UNI, LKS, Labour Party Future with Confidence, Caledonia Together, Generations NC	2019 (legislative)
France	Réunion	Multi-party	PLR-LFI, PS-PCR, DVG The Republicans	2021 (regional)
France	Saint Pierre and Miquelon	Two-party	Archipelago Tomorrow (LR) Together for the Future (PRG)	2022 (legislative)
France	Wallis and Futuna	Multi-party	DVG, PS Independents, DVC, DVR, LR	2022 (legislative)
Netherlands	Aruba	Multi-party	Aruban People's Party, FUTURO People's Electoral Movement, Aruban Patriotic Party	2024 (general)
Netherlands	Bonaire	Multi-party	Bonaire People's Movement Bonaire Democratic Party, Bonaire Patriotic Union	2023 (general)
Netherlands	Curaçao	Multi-party	Movement for the Future of Curaçao, National People's Party Real Alternative Party, Partido MAN	2025 (general)
Netherlands	Sint Maarten	Multi-party	URSM, Democratic Party, Party for Progress, NOW National Alliance, United People's Party	2024 (general)
New Zealand	Cook Islands	Multi-party	Cook Islands Party, Pro-government independents Democratic Party, Cook Islands United Party, One Cook Islands Movement	2022 (general)
New Zealand	Niue	Non-partisan	Independents (no political parties)	2026 (general)
New Zealand	Tokelau	Non-partisan	Independents (no political parties)	2026 (general)
United Kingdom	Alderney	Non-partisan	Independents (no political parties)	2024 (general)
United Kingdom	Anguilla	Two-party	Anguilla United Front Anguilla Progressive Movement	2025 (general)
United Kingdom	Ascension Island	Non-partisan	Independents (no political parties)	2025 (general)
United Kingdom	Bermuda	Two-party	Progressive Labour Party One Bermuda Alliance	2025 (general)
United Kingdom	British Virgin Islands	Multi-party	Virgin Islands Party Progressive Virgin Islands Movement, NDP, Progressives United	2023 (general)
United Kingdom	Cayman Islands	Multi-party	Caymanian Community Party, Cayman Islands National Party People's Progressive Movement	2025 (general)
United Kingdom	Falkland Islands	Non-partisan	Independents (no political parties)	2025 (general)
United Kingdom	Gibraltar	Multi-party	GSLP–Liberal Alliance (GSLP, LPG) Gibraltar Social Democrats	2023 (general)
United Kingdom	Guernsey	Multi-party	Independents Forward Guernsey	2025 (general)
United Kingdom	Isle of Man	Multi-party	Independents Labour Party, Liberal Vannin Party	2021 (general)
United Kingdom	Jersey	Multi-party (Note: Independent politicians dominate Jersey's political system.)	Independents, Reform Jersey, Advance Jersey Independents, Better Way	2022 (general)
United Kingdom	Montserrat	Two-party	United Alliance People's Democratic Movement (official opposition), Movement for Change and Prosperity	2024 (general)
United Kingdom	Pitcairn Islands	Non-partisan	Independents (no political parties)	2023 (general)
United Kingdom	Saint Helena	Non-partisan	Independents (no political parties)	2025 (general)
United Kingdom	Tristan da Cunha	Non-partisan	Independents (no political parties)	2025 (general)
United Kingdom	Turks and Caicos Islands	Two-party	Progressive National Party People's Democratic Movement	2025 (general)
United States	Puerto Rico	Two-party	New Progressive Party PPD, Puerto Rican Independence Party, PD, MVC	2024 (general)
United States	U.S. Virgin Islands	Multi-party	Democratic Party Republican Party, Independent Citizens Movement	2022 (gubernatorial); 2024 (general)

== Disputed territories ==
Country	Party system	Ruling party or coalition Other parties	Last election
Abkhazia	Multi-party	Pro-government independents, Amtsakhara, Aitaira Opposition independents	2025 (presidential); 2022 (parliament)
Kosovo	Multi-party	Vetëvendosje, Guxo, Alternativa, KDTP, NDS, IRDK, Vakat, LPRK, SDU, PAI PDK, LDK, Serb List, AAK, AKR, JGP, RI, GI SPO	2025 (parliament)
Northern Cyprus	Multi-party	Republican Turkish Party, National Unity Party, Democratic Party, Rebirth Party People's Party	2025 (presidential); 2022 (parliament)
Palestine	Multi-party	PLO (Fatah, PFLP, DFLP, PPP), National Initiative, Third Way Hamas (de facto control of the Gaza Strip)	2006 (legislative)
(Sahrawi Arab Democratic Republic) Sahrawi Arab; Democratic Republic	One-party	Polisario Front	2023 (legislative)
Somaliland	Multi-party	Waddani, Justice and Welfare Party Kulmiye	2024 (presidential); 2021 (parliament)
South Ossetia	Multi-party	Nykhaz, People's Party, Communist Party United Ossetia	2022 (presidential); 2024 (parliament)
Taiwan (Republic of China) (Note: See also Political status of Taiwan and One China)	Multi-party	Democratic Progressive Party Kuomintang, Taiwan People's Party	2024 (presidential); 2024 (legislative)
Transnistria	Dominant-party	Obnovlenie No parliamentary opposition; Transnistrian Communist Party	2021 (presidential); 2025 (parliament)

== Supranational entities ==
Country	Party system	Ruling party or coalition Other parties	Last election
European Union	Multi-party	EPP, PES, ALDE, ECR Patriots.eu, EGP, ESN, ELA, EDP, EFA, PEL, ECPM	2024 (parliament)

== See also ==
- List of banned political parties
- List of basic political science topics
- List of countries without political parties
- List of current heads of state and government
- List of democracy and elections-related topics
- List of election results
- List of frivolous parties
- List of national leaders
- Lists of political parties
- List of political parties by region
