= André Ebanks =

Premier of the Cayman Islands since 2025

The Honourable André Ebanks
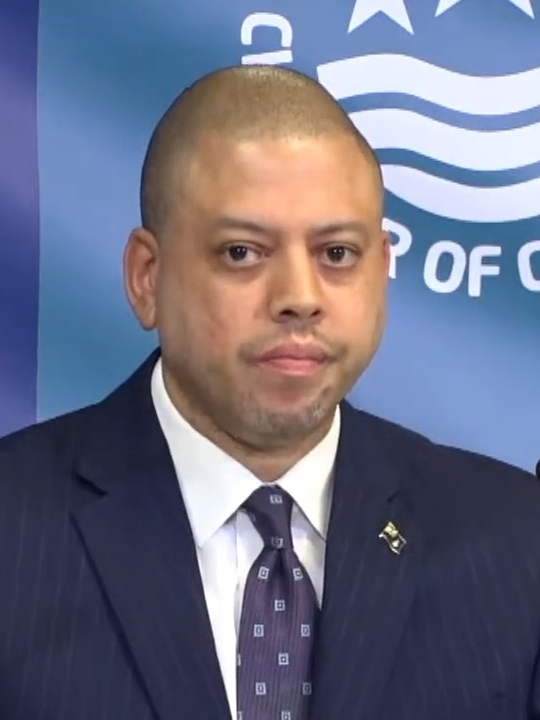
- Ebanks in 2021

Premier of the Cayman Islands
- Incumbent
- Assumed office 6 May 2025
- Monarch: Charles III
- Governor: Jane Owen
- Preceded by: Julianna O'Connor-Connolly

Member of the Parliament of the Cayman Islands
- Incumbent
- Assumed office 14 April 2021
- Constituency: West Bay South

Personal details
- Party: Independent (until 2023); UPM (2023–2024); TCCP (2025–present)
- Education: Morgan State University; University of Liverpool; Manchester Metropolitan University
- Profession: Politician

André Martin Ebanks is a Caymanian politician and lawyer serving as the Premier of the Cayman Islands since May 2025, and also represents West Bay South as a member of the Parliament of the Cayman Islands. He is the leader of the Caymanian Community Party (TCCP) and leader of the Government coalition consisting of members of the Caymanian Community Party and the Cayman Islands National Party (CINP) called the National Coalition For Caymanians (NCFC).

== Biography ==
From the Cayman Islands, Ebanks graduated from Morgan State University in the U.S. with a degree in sociology, later receiving a Bachelor of Laws from the University of Liverpool through studying at the Truman Bodden Law School in the Cayman Islands and a Masters in Legal Practice from Manchester Metropolitan University. He became a member of the Bar of England and Wales in 2005 and joined the Cayman Islands Bar in 2006. He worked as an investment funds associate for Appleby Cayman and was an associate for the Investment Funds Practice Group of Walkers, specializing in investment fund formation, restructurings, and liquidation.

Ebanks later entered civil service. He worked for the Ministry of Financial Services as a senior policy advisor from 2014 to 2018 and then served as deputy chief officer for the Ministry of Community Affairs from 2018 to 2019, "with primary responsibility for the Department of Children and Family Services, the Needs Assessment Unit, and the Gender Affairs Unit". From 2019 to 2021, he served as the Cayman Islands Representative to the UK and Europe.

In 2021, Ebanks ran for election as an independent to the Parliament of the Cayman Islands during the 2021 Caymanian general election, winning the West Bay South seat over his opponent, Raul Nicholson-Coe, with 72% of the vote. After being elected, he became the minister of financial services and commerce and served as deputy premier under Julianna O'Connor-Connolly. During his tenure, he joined the United People's Movement (UPM) but later left the party in October 2024. In January 2025, he was announced as the leader of a new party, the Caymanian Community Party (TCCP). Although his party did not win an outright majority in the 2025 Caymanian general election, the TCCP, the Cayman Islands National Party (CINP) and three independents formed a coalition called the National Coalition for Caymanians (NCFC), putting Ebanks in a position to be Premier. He was sworn in as Premier on 6 May 2025.
