= List of political parties in the Cayman Islands =

This article lists political parties in the Cayman Islands. A political party is a political organization subscribing to a certain ideology or formed around very special issues with the aim to participate in power, usually by participating in elections.

See political party for a more comprehensive discussion.

The Cayman Islands had a non-partisan system, but it evolved into a multi-party system.

== Active parties ==
These parties have seats in Parliament, the elected assembly of the Cayman Islands. Members were elected in the 2025 Caymanian general election held on 30 April 2025.

Party	Abbr.	Leader	Political position	Ideology	MPs
People's Progressive Movement	PPM	Joey Hew	Centre-left	Economic liberalism; Third Way	7 / 19
Caymanian Community Party	TCCP	André Ebanks		Environmentalism	4 / 19
Cayman Islands National Party	CINP	Dan Scott	Centre-right to right-wing	Populism	4 / 19

== Defunct parties ==
- Cayman Vanguard Party
- National Democratic Party
- Cayman Democratic Party
- United People's Movement

== See also ==
- Lists of political parties
