= List of political parties in Georgia =

List of political parties in Georgia may refer to:

- List of political parties in Georgia (country)
- List of political parties in Georgia (U.S. state)
