= 2025 Caymanian referendum =

A nonbinding referendum was held in the Cayman Islands on 30 April 2025, alongside the general election. Voters were asked three questions.

== Questions ==
1. "Should the Cayman Islands develop cruise berthing infrastructure?"
2. "Do you support the introduction of a National Lottery in the Islands?"
3. "Do you support the decriminalisation of the consumption and possession of small amounts of cannabis?"

== Campaigns ==
The Association for Cruise Tourism (ACT), a coalition of stakeholders in the tourism industry, have led a campaign to promote the 'yes' vote on the question that, if passed, would allow the government to build cruise berthing facilities. Cruise Port Referendum (CPR) Cayman, a group advocating for environmentally-conscious tourism, has led the campaign to vote 'no'. On 11 April 2025, CPR Cayman accused the ACT in a press release of using misleading ads in their campaign. Elections Supervisor Wesley Howell responded to CPR's concerns by stating:

There are no provisions in the Referendum Act or the applicable sections of the Elections Act that make it illegal or unlawful to erect a sign or issue a broadcast, for that matter, which is viewed as misleading in relation to a referendum question. I therefore have no legal authority to address your concern.

== Results ==
Voters rejected a proposal to build cruise ship berths, but approved the creation of a national lottery and the decriminalisation of possession of small amounts of cannabis.

Question	For		Against		Invalid/ blank	Total votes	Registered voters	Turnout	Outcome
Question	Votes	%	Votes	%	Invalid/ blank	Total votes	Registered voters	Turnout	Outcome
Developing cruise berthing infrastructure	5,417	31.15	11,973	68.85	1,275	18,665	25,643	72.79	Rejected
Introduction of a national lottery	9,563	55.17	7,770	44.83	1,330	18,663	25,643	72.78	Approved
Decriminalisation of small amounts of cannabis	10,385	60.40	6,809	39.60	1,483	18,677	25,643	72.83	Approved
Source: Government of the Cayman Islands
