= Carlos Flores (Spanish politician) =

Spanish politician (born 1964)

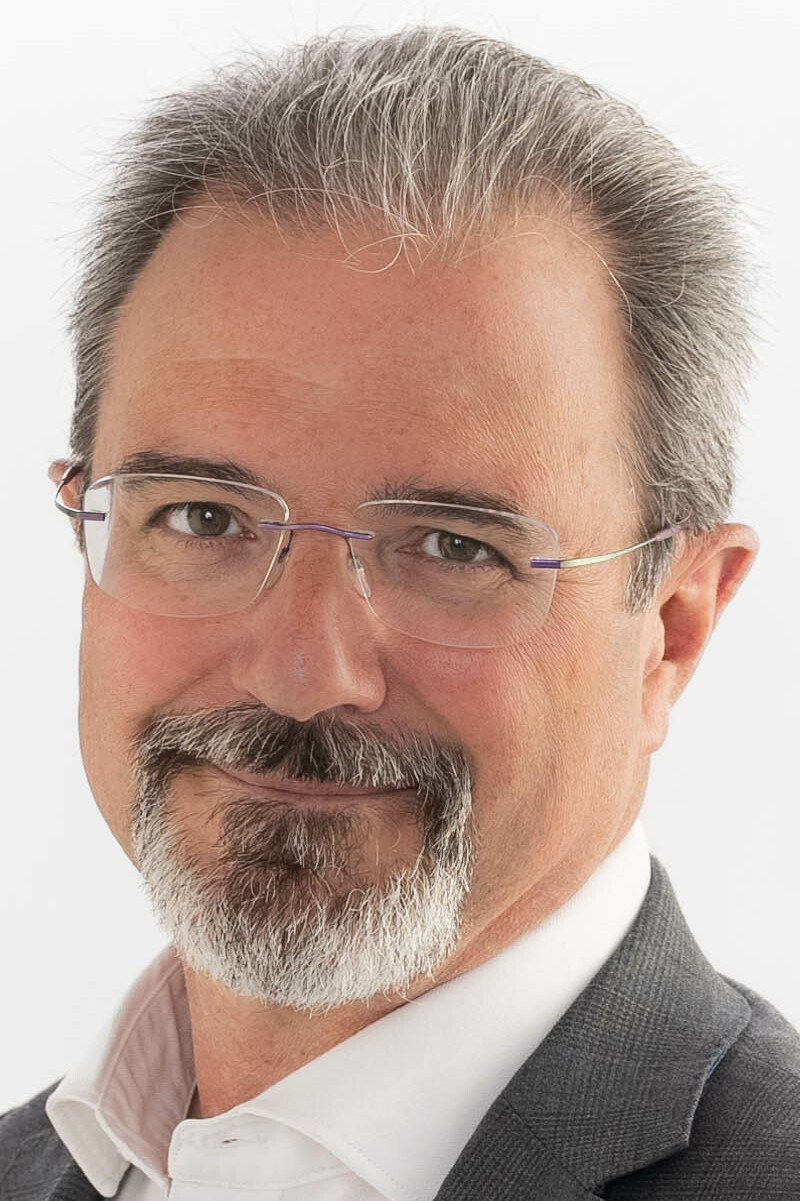
Flores in 2023

Carlos Flores Juberías (born 1964) is a Spanish professor of law at the University of Valencia, specialising in the Constitution of Spain. He was the lead candidate for Vox in the 2023 Valencian regional election, in which they came fourth with 13 seats. The party formed a government with the People's Party (PP), in which he was not included due to controversy over his conviction for harassment of his ex-wife in 2002. He was then elected to the Congress of Deputies.

== Biography ==
Flores was born in Valencia. He graduated and completed a doctorate in law at the University of Valencia, where he became an associate professor in 1995 and in 2017 became a full professor of constitutional law; from 1993 to 1995 he was a visiting professor at the University of California, San Diego on a Fulbright scholarship, and he obtained a further degree in political science from the National University of Distance Education. He was a columnist for the national conservative newspaper ABC from 2008 to 2015, and later for the Valencian newspaper Las Provincias. He received honorary doctorates from the University of San Francisco Xavier in Bolivia (2011) and the Ss. Cyril and Methodius University of Skopje in North Macedonia (2015), and became the latter country's honorary consul in Valencia in 2008. Since 2016, he is a member of the Transparency Council of the Generalitat Valenciana. In addition to his writings on the Spanish constitution, he also studies the democratic process in Eastern Europe.

In December 2022, Flores was chosen by Vox as their lead candidate in the 2023 Valencian regional election. After his selection, local newspaper Levante-EMV revealed that he had been sentenced to a year in prison and €6,000 in 2002 for harassment of his ex-wife, from whom he had separated in 1999. He said that he and his wife had both repeatedly filed charges against each other at the time, all of which were dropped or ended in acquittal except that one, which was suspended due to his lack of a prior criminal record. Vox won 13 seats, up from 10, while the People's Party (PP) took the most seats with 40. The PP and Vox formed a government, though Flores was excluded from it by order of the PP's national leadership due to his conviction; he was instead placed as Vox's lead candidate in the Valencia constituency for the 2023 Spanish general election in July. He was one of three Vox members voted by the constituency to the 15th Congress of Deputies

== Political views ==
Flores interprets the Constitution of Spain as prohibiting abortion due to the right to life. He has accused Catalan nationalist and left-wing parties as acting contrary to the constitution, and prime minister Pedro Sánchez of supporting the constitution in words while acting against it in deeds. He said there was no legal basis for the Catalan declaration of independence in 2017. During the COVID-19 pandemic in Spain, he opined on the state of emergency declared by Sánchez's government, declaring it unconstitutional and against the rule of law; this view was shared by the Supreme Court of Spain 18 months later. He likened it to theoretically taking the rights of all Basques or Muslims in the fight against terrorism.

Flores said in 2018 that a law proposed by Unidas Podemos to move certain powers from provincial deputations to the Generalitat was unconstitutional as it went against article 137 of the constitution which defines the division of territory. He defends the monarchy, saying in October 2020 that Felipe VI of Spain was superior to many presidents, including being more democratic than Recep Tayyip Erdoğan of Turkey.

After the 2018 Andalusian regional election, the first in which Vox won seats in a regional legislature, Flores – not yet a member of the party – said that the same would happen in the Valencian Community. He mentioned that there were concerns over immigration including the recent docking of the Aquarius Dignitus rescue vessel in the region, concerns over separatism including the Catalan independence movement, and the decline of the People's Party of the Valencian Community due to corruption scandals.
