= Caymanian Community Party =

Political party

- Abbreviation: TCCP
- Leader: André Ebanks
- Split from: United People's Movement
- Headquarters: West Bay, Grand Cayman
- Ideology: Environmentalism
- Colours: Cyan; Dark blue
- Parliament of the Cayman Islands: 4 / 19

Website
- thecaymaniancommunityparty.ky

The Caymanian Community Party is a Caymanian political party led by André Ebanks. It was formed from former UPM members who had split from the incumbent government due to their concerns over issues that had posed risk to the islands' environment, specifically the National Conservation Amendment Bill, which had proposed removing mandatory environmental assessments and removing scientific experts from the National Conservation Council.

At the 2025 election, the Caymanian Community Party won four seats and 28.88% of the vote. The party formed a coalition with the Cayman Islands National Party and three independents, with Ebanks becoming Premier of the Cayman Islands.

== Election results ==
Election	Leader	Votes	%	Seats	Result
2025	André Ebanks	4,953	26.88%	4 / 19	Coalition
