= List of political parties in Wyoming =

This article lists political parties in the U.S. state of Wyoming.

== Currently recognized parties ==
| Party | Ideology | Members (Jan. 2025) | Dec. 2024 | 2024 presidential vote | 2022 gubernatorial vote | U.S. Congress | State legislature | Executive offices |
|---|---|---|---|---|---|---|---|---|
| Constitution Party | Paleoconservatism | 624 ▼ (0.21%) | 628 (0.21%) | N/A | N/A | 0 / 3 | 0 / 93 | 0 / 6 |
| Democratic Party | Liberalism | 34,845 ▼ (11.74%) | 34,870 (11.74%) | 69,527 (25.84%) | 30,686 (15.82%) | 0 / 3 | 8 / 93 | 0 / 6 |
| Libertarian Party | Libertarianism | 2,016 ▲ (0.68%) | 2,012 (0.68%) | 4,193 (1.56%) | 8,157 (4.20%) | 0 / 3 | 0 / 93 | 0 / 6 |
| Republican Party | Conservatism | 227,881 ▼ (76.80%) | 228,173 (76.83%) | 192,633 (71.60%) | 143,696 (74.07%) | 3 / 3 | 85 / 93 | 6 / 6 |
| Others | | 2,452 ▲ (0.83%) | 2,442 (0.82%) | 2,695 (1.00%) | 11,461 (5.91%) | 0 / 3 | 0 / 93 | 0 / 6 |
| Unaffiliated | | 28,885 ▲ (9.74%) | 28,835 (9.71%) | N/A | N/A | — | | |
| Total | | 296,703 ▼ | 296,960 | 269,048 | 194,000 | — | | |

== Formerly recognized parties ==
| Party | Ideology | Years recognized | Final members | Final presidential vote |
|---|---|---|---|---|
| No Labels | Centrism | Apr 2024 – Nov 2024 | 636 | N/A |
| Americans Elect | | Mar 2012 – Dec 2012 | 45 | N/A |
| Country Party | | Jun 2012 – Dec 2012 | 69 | N/A |
| Wyoming Reform | Centrism | 2000 – 2002 | 5 | 2,724 (2000) |
| Natural Law | Transcendental; Meditation | 1996 – 2002 | 22 | 582 (1996) |
| New Alliance Party | Left-wing populism | 1988 | 8 | 545 (1988) |
