= Communist Party of Georgia (U.S. state) =

Political party in Georgia (U.S. state)

- Abbreviation: CPUSA Georgia
- Founded: September 1, 1919
- Split from: Socialist Party of Georgia
- Headquarters: Atlanta, Georgia
- Ideology: Communism; Marxism–Leninism; Anti-Trumpism
- National affiliation: Communist Party USA
- International affiliation: IMCWP

The Communist Party of Georgia, known more commonly as CPUSA Georgia and also known as the Georgian Communist Party, is a state affiliate of the Communist Party USA (CPUSA) based in Georgia. Following the lead of the national CPUSA, CPUSA Georgia adheres to the principles of Marxism–Leninism; it is currently a participant in the anti-Trump movement.

The height of the Communist Party of Georgia occurred during the Great Depression when Angelo Herndon served as the primary leading figure of the American labor movement within Georgia. Following World War II, McCarthyism and the Cold War ultimately destroyed the Georgian Communist movement by 1958. The movement has since reemerged in Georgia, however.

CPUSA Georgia has often clashed with other third parties based in Georgia, notably the Libertarian Party of Georgia (LPGA). Former Chairman of CPUSA Sam Webb once came to the University of Georgia (UGA) on behalf of CPUSA Georgia to debate against LPGA.

== History ==
=== Rise and split of the Socialists ===
Entering the 20th century, the People's Party collapsed. Many of its members followed Eugene V. Debs into the SPA and the People's Party of Georgia merged into the Socialist Party of Georgia. Watson refused to join the SPA and became a Democrat, although he later collaborated with the Socialist Party in opposing World War I.

Following the Russian Revolution and the birth of Marxism–Leninism in the Russian Soviet Federative Socialist Republic, a split began to brew within the SPA. The factions were similar to the Bolsheviks and the Mensheviks within the pre-Russian Revolution Russian Social Democratic Labour Party. In 1919, the Bolshevik faction of the Socialist Party officially split and formed the Communist Party of the United States.

== Presidential tickets ==
CPUSA Georgia candidates for president and vice president
Year	President	Vice President	Votes	Percent
1924	William Z. Foster	Benjamin Gitlow	0	0.00%
1928	William Z. Foster	Benjamin Gitlow	64	0.03%
1932	William Z. Foster	James W. Ford	23	0.01%
1936	Earl Browder	James W. Ford	0	0.00%
1940	Earl Browder	James W. Ford	0	0.00%
1944	Franklin D. Roosevelt	Harry S. Truman	268,187	81.74%
1948	Henry A. Wallace	Glen H. Taylor	1,636	0.39%
1952	Vincent Hallinan	Charlotta Bass	0	0.00%
1968	Charlene Mitchell	Michael Zagarell	2	0.00%
1972	Gus Hall	Jarvis Tyner	1,873	0.16%
1976	Gus Hall	Jarvis Tyner	3	0.00%
1980	Gus Hall	Angela Davis	884	0.01%
1984	Gus Hall	Angela Davis	743	0.04%
2000	Al Gore	Joe Lieberman	1,116,230	42.98%
2004	John Kerry	John Edwards	1,366,149	41.37%
2008	Barack Obama	Joe Biden	1,844,123	46.90%
2012	Barack Obama	Joe Biden	1,773,827	45.48%
2016	Hillary Clinton	Tim Kaine	1,877,963	45.64%
2020	Joe Biden	Kamala Harris	2,473,633	49.47%

== Gubernatorial tickets ==
CPUSA Georgia candidates for governor
Year	Governor	Votes	Percent
2002	Roy Barnes	937,062	46.23%
2006	Mark Taylor	811,049	38.2%
2010	Roy Barnes	1,107,011	43.0%
2014	Jason Carter	1,144,794	44.9%
2018	Stacey Abrams	1,923,685	48.8%
2022	Stacey Abrams	1,813,673	45.9%
