= Wolaita People's Liberation Movement =

Political party in Ethiopia

Wolaita People's Liberation Movement Wolayttaawatu La'atettaa Qaattaa
- WPLM logo
- Amharic name: የዎላይታ ሕዝብ ብሔራዊ ንቅናቄ
- Abbreviation: WPLM
- President: Woldemariam Lisanu (dr.)
- Political sector head: Amanuel Belachew
- Party's national office head: Tadewos Chinasho
- Founded: 22 April 2023
- Headquarters: Wolaita Sodo
- Youth wing: Wolayta Yelaga
- Ideology: Wolaitans' nationalism

Website
- Wolaita People's Liberation Movement

The Wolaita People's Liberation Movement or Wolaitans Liberation Movement (Wolayttattuwa: Wolayttaawatu La'atettaa Qaattaa), in short WPLM is a political party in Ethiopia founded in 2023. Before its formation the party has been working on a temporary permit from the National Election Board of Ethiopia for three months. The main objective of the movement is to enable the Wolaitans to have their rights respected in various areas of Ethiopia. The party is formed as a national party, and at the time of its formation, the party's members were from the former Southern Region, Oromia, Tigray, Gambella, Afar and Addis Ababa City Administration.

== History ==
On 22 October 2024, the National Election Board of Ethiopia suspended the WPLM and prohibited them from engaging in any political activities or being nominated in elections for non-compliance. After fulfilling the required compliance measures, the party submitted its election symbol to the National Election Board of Ethiopia for the 2026 Ethiopian general election. The party chose the bee as its official election symbol.
