= List of political parties in Georgia (U.S. state) =

This article is a list of political parties in Georgia, a U.S. state.

== Active parties ==
=== Major parties ===
Party	Year founded	Ideology	Presidential vote	Senate	House of Representatives	Georgia State Senate	Georgia House of Representatives
Democratic Party of Georgia	1828	Liberalism	49.47%	2/2	5/14	23/56	79/180
Georgia Republican Party	1854	Conservatism	49.24%	0/2	9/14	33/56	101/180

=== Third parties ===
Party	Year founded	Ideology	Presidential vote	Senate	House of Representatives	Georgia State Senate	Georgia House of Representatives
Communist Party of Georgia	1919	Marxism–Leninism	Non-electoral political party				
Libertarian Party of Georgia	1972	Libertarianism	1.24%	0/2	0/14	0/56	0/180
New Black Panther Party of Georgia	1989	Black nationalism	Non-electoral political party				
Georgia Green Party	2001	Green politics	0.02%	0/2	0/14	0/56	0/180
Black Hammer Party	2019	Black conservatism	49.24% (endorsing the Republican Party)	Non-electoral political party	3/14 (endorsing the Freedom Caucus)	Non-electoral political party	

== Historical parties ==
Party	Time period	Ideology	Peak presidential vote	Peak Senate	Peak House of Representatives	Peak Georgia State Senate	Peak Georgia House of Representatives
People's Party of Georgia	1892-1906	Agrarian socialism	18.80%	0/2	1	0/56	0
States' Rights Democratic Party of Georgia	1948	Segregationism	20.31%	1/2	0	0/56	0
Reform Party of Georgia	1995-1998	Populism	6.37%	0/2	0	0/56	0
Southern Party of Georgia	1999-2008	Neo-Confederatism	0.73% (endorsing the Libertarian Party)	0/2	0	0/56	0

== See also ==
- Political party strength in Georgia
