= 2025 Caymanian general election =

← 2021	30 April 2025	2029 →
- 19 seats in the Parliament of the Cayman Islands; 10 seats needed for a majority
- Turnout: 72.89%
Party	Leader	Vote %	Seats	+/–
PPM	Joey Hew	27.37	7	0
TCCP	André Ebanks	26.88	4	New
CINP	Daniel Scott	19.51	4	New
Independent	–	26.23	4	−8
This lists parties that won seats. See the complete results below.
Results by constituency
Premier before	Premier after
Julianna O'Connor-Connolly; PPM	André Ebanks; TCCP

A general election was held in the Cayman Islands on 30 April 2025. It was held the same day as the referendum.

== Background ==
The 2021 elections saw independent candidates win 12 seats and the People's Progressive Movement (PPM) win seven. A government was formed by independent Wayne Panton, who became Premier. In November 2023, twelve MPs joined the new United People's Movement (UPM), with its leader Julianna O'Connor-Connolly becoming Premier. On 31 October 2024, four UPM MPs resigned from government, resulting in it losing its majority in parliament. In February and March 2025, three of seven members of the minority UPM government including O'Connor-Connolly joined PPM to seek re-election.

== Electoral system ==
The Parliament has 21 members. Nineteen members are directly elected by first-past-the-post voting from single-member constituencies, for a four-year term. Two ex officio (appointed) members are the Deputy Governor and the Attorney-General, who are appointed by the Governor.

== Contesting parties ==
The UPM has stated that it will not contest the 2025 elections and will dissolve. The four former members of the UPM formed a new political party, the Caymanian Community Party (TCCP), headed by André Ebanks.

The opposition PPM will contest the elections with Joey Hew as its leader following resignations of Speaker and former Premier Alden McLaughlin and former Deputy Premier Moses Kirkconnell.

The Cayman Islands National Party (CINP) is a new party formed by Dan Scott, a former regional managing partner at Ernst & Young.

== Results ==
Preliminary results showed the PPM winning the most with seven seats but failing to gain a majority. TCCP, CINP, and Independents won four seats each. Independent Chris Saunders, who was elected in Bodden Town West, stated that he will only work with the PPM.

Party	Votes	%	Seats	+/–
People's Progressive Movement	5,044	27.37	7	0
Caymanian Community Party	4,953	26.88	4	New
Cayman Islands National Party	3,596	19.51	4	New
Independent	4,834	26.23	4	–8
Total	18,427	100.00	19	–
Valid votes	18,427	98.74		
Invalid/blank votes	236	1.26		
Total votes	18,663	100.00		
Registered voters/turnout	25,606	72.89		
Source: Elections Office

=== By constituency ===
Constituency	Electorate	Candidate	Party	Votes	%
Bodden Town East	1,760	Dwayne Seymour	People's Progressive Movement	680	56.20
Bodden Town East	1,760	Robert Anthony Bodden	Caymanian Community Party	504	41.65
Bodden Town East	1,760	Spoiled		26	2.15
Bodden Town West	1,742	Christopher Saunders	Independent	565	43.83
Bodden Town West	1,742	Osbourne Bodden	Caymanian Community Party	409	31.73
Bodden Town West	1,742	Haymond Rankin	Cayman Islands National Party	298	23.12
Bodden Town West	1,742	Spoiled		17	1.32
Cayman Brac East	520	Julianna O'Connor-Connolly	People's Progressive Movement	236	55.27
Cayman Brac East	520	Layman Daniel Scott	Cayman Islands National Party	160	37.47
Cayman Brac East	520	Ruth Ann Bodden	Independent	11	2.58
Cayman Brac East	520	James Albert Christian	Independent	10	2.34
Cayman Brac East	520	Maxine Avon McCoy Moore	Independent	9	2.11
Cayman Brac East	520	Spoiled		1	0.23
Cayman Brac West & Little Cayman	605	Nickolas DaCosta	Cayman Islands National Party	262	55.27
Cayman Brac West & Little Cayman	605	Lonny Lee Tibbetts	Independent	207	43.67
Cayman Brac West & Little Cayman	605	Spoiled		5	1.05
East End	896	Isaac D. Rankine	Independent	390	52.77
East End	896	Gueva M. Richards	Cayman Islands National Party	138	18.67
East End	896	John B. McLean Jr	Independent	103	13.94
East End	896	Delmira Bodden	People's Progressive Movement	86	11.64
East End	896	Roydell Carter	Independent	16	2.17
East End	896	Spoiled		6	0.81
George Town Central	1,467	Kenneth Vernon Bryan	People's Progressive Movement	750	67.81
George Town Central	1,467	Anthony Ramoon	Caymanian Community Party	210	18.99
George Town Central	1,467	Carmen Tessa McField	Cayman Islands National Party	136	12.30
George Town Central	1,467	Spoiled		10	0.90
George Town East	1,581	Roy McTaggart	People's Progressive Movement	429	38.24
George Town East	1,581	Vassel Johnson Jr.	Cayman Islands National Party	417	37.17
George Town East	1,581	Emily Cecelia Ann DeCou	Caymanian Community Party	245	21.84
George Town East	1,581	Oscar Rojelio Bodden	Independent	23	2.05
George Town East	1,581	Spoiled		8	0.71
George Town North	1,363	Joseph Hew	People's Progressive Movement	601	69.08
George Town North	1,363	Romellia Welcome	Independent	243	27.93
George Town North	1,363	Spoiled		26	2.99
George Town South	1,420	Gary Rutty	Cayman Islands National Party	516	50.64
George Town South	1,420	Alric Lindsay	Independent	278	27.28
George Town South	1,420	Craig Frederick	People's Progressive Movement	212	20.80
George Town South	1,420	Spoiled		13	1.28
George Town West	1,285	Pearlina L. McGaw-Lumsden	People's Progressive Movement	438	51.35
George Town West	1,285	Craig T. Merren	Cayman Islands National Party	369	43.26
George Town West	1,285	Hunter J. Walton	Independent	22	2.58
George Town West	1,285	Tyree Malcolm Hernandez	Independent	15	1.76
George Town West	1,285	Spoiled		9	1.06
Newlands	1,659	Wayne Panton	Caymanian Community Party	620	48.48
Newlands	1,659	Alva Suckoo	People's Progressive Movement	337	26.35
Newlands	1,659	Raul Gonzalez Jr.	Independent	312	24.39
Newlands	1,659	Spoiled		10	0.78
North Side	1,007	Johany Ebanks	Independent	624	74.02
North Side	1,007	Justin Craig Ebanks	People's Progressive Movement	197	23.37
North Side	1,007	Spoiled		22	2.61
Prospect	1,413	Michael Myles	Cayman Islands National Party	367	35.87
Prospect	1,413	Sabrina Turner	Caymanian Community Party	351	34.31
Prospect	1,413	Crystal Gomez Wilson	People's Progressive Movement	288	28.15
Prospect	1,413	Spoiled		17	1.66
Red Bay	1,430	Roy Tatum	People's Progressive Movement	334	31.90
Red Bay	1,430	Melrose Natasha Whitelocke	Caymanian Community Party	301	28.75
Red Bay	1,430	Dawn Thomas	Cayman Islands National Party	267	25.50
Red Bay	1,430	Phillip Ebanks	Independent	120	11.46
Red Bay	1,430	Leon Gould	Independent	21	2.01
Red Bay	1,430	Spoiled		4	0.38
Savannah	1,601	Heather Dianne Bodden	Caymanian Community Party	690	59.59
Savannah	1,601	Donna Bush	People's Progressive Movement	456	39.38
Savannah	1,601	Spoiled		12	1.04
West Bay Central	1,284	Katherine Ebanks-Wilks	Caymanian Community Party	644	66.87
West Bay Central	1,284	Jewel Hydes	Independent	308	31.98
West Bay Central	1,284	Spoiled		11	1.14
West Bay North	1,421	Rolston Anglin	Independent	509	50.35
West Bay North	1,421	Jordan D. Rivers	Cayman Islands National Party	192	18.99
West Bay North	1,421	Shakeina S. Bush	Independent	160	15.83
West Bay North	1,421	Jermaine Ebanks-Hurlston	Independent	140	13.85
West Bay North	1,421	Spoiled		10	0.99
West Bay South	1,772	André Ebanks	Caymanian Community Party	979	76.13
West Bay South	1,772	Sterling Dwayne Ebanks	Independent	293	22.78
West Bay South	1,772	Spoiled		14	1.09
West Bay West	1,380	Julie Joy Theresa Hunter	Cayman Islands National Party	474	50.21
West Bay West	1,380	McKeeva Bush	Independent	455	48.20
West Bay West	1,380	Spoiled		15	1.59

== Aftermath ==
Following the election, the Caymanian Community Party and the Cayman Islands National Party were joined by three independents to form a governing coalition. The group named itself the National Coalition For Caymanians, with TCCP leader André Ebanks as premier-elect. Ebanks and the rest of the government were sworn in on 6 May 2025.
