= 2024 New Mexico elections =

- November 5, 2024

A general election was held in the U.S. State of New Mexico on November 5, 2024.

== Federal elections ==
=== U.S. President ===
2024 United States presidential election in New Mexico
Party	Candidate	Votes	%	±%
Democratic	Kamala Harris; Tim Walz	478,802	51.85	−2.44
Republican	Donald Trump; JD Vance	423,391	45.85	+2.35
Independent	Robert F. Kennedy Jr. (withdrawn); Nicole Shanahan (withdrawn)	9,553	1.04	N/A
Green	Jill Stein; Butch Ware	4,611	0.50	+0.02
Free New Mexico	Chase Oliver (Note: The Free New Mexico Party is the state affiliate of the national Libertarian Party, which nominated Oliver and ter Maat. The Libertarian Party of New Mexico, which separated from the national party in 2022 and is now affiliated to Liberal Party USA, nominated Ebke and Butler.); Mike ter Maat	3,745	0.41	−0.95
Socialism and Liberation	Claudia De la Cruz; Karina Garcia	2,442	0.26	+0.08
Liberal	Laura Ebke; Tricia Butler	859	0.09%	N/A
Total votes		923,403	100.00%	N/A
Democratic win				

=== U.S. Senate ===
2024 United States Senate election in New Mexico
Party	Candidate	Votes	%	±%
Democratic	Martin Heinrich (incumbent)	497,333	55.06%	+0.97%
Republican	Nella Domenici	405,978	44.94%	+14.41%
Total votes		903,311	100.0%	
Turnout			65.33%	+10.33
Democratic hold				

=== U.S. House of Representatives ===
District	Democratic		Republican		Total		Result
District	Votes	%	Votes	%	Votes	%	Result
District 1	193,203	56.37%	149,546	43.63%	342,749	100.00%	Democratic hold
District 2	138,177	52.08%	127,145	47.92%	265,322	100.00%	Democratic hold
District 3	162,342	56.29%	126,085	43.71%	288,427	100.00%	Democratic hold
Total	493,722	55.07%	402,776	44.93%	896,498	100.00%	

== State elections ==
=== State legislature ===
Senate
Party	Before	After	Change
Democratic	27	26	▼1
Republican	15	16	▲1
Total	42	42	

House of Representatives
Party	Before	After	Change
Democratic	45	44	▼1
Republican	25	26	▲1
Total	70	70	
