= List of political parties in Asturias =

This article lists political parties in Asturias.

Asturias has a multi-party system at both the national and regional level. There are five political parties with representation in the General Junta of the Principality of Asturias, (the communist IU–IX, progressive Podemos, moderate FSA–PSOE, liberal Ciudadanos, regionalist FAC and conservative PP) which makes it extremely difficult for any other formation or coalition to achieve an electoral majority in the parliament.

== Most voted political parties in the 2019 Asturian parliamentary election ==
Party	Position	Ideology	Results (2019)	Seats in Parliament (Total: 45)
Asturian Socialist Federation (FSA–PSOE); Federación Socialista Asturiana	Centre-left	Progressivism, social democracy, federalism, pro-Europeanism	187,462 votes 35.3% of the electorate	20
People's Party of Asturias (PP); Partido Popular de Asturias	Centre-right to right-wing	Conservatism, liberal conservatism, Christian democracy, economic liberalism, unionism	93,147 votes 17.5% of the electorate	10
Citizens; Ciudadanos	Centre-left to centre-right	Liberalism, social democracy, secularism, autonomism, pro-Europeanism, Spanish unionism, postnationalism	74,271 votes 14.0% of the electorate	5
We Can Asturias; Podemos Asturies	Left-wing	Social democracy, Republicanism, Antimilitarism, Internationalism, Feminism, Environmentalism	58,674 votes 11.0% of the electorate	4
United Left of Asturias (IU–IX); Izquierda Xunida d'Asturies	Left-wing	Communism, Republicanism, Antimilitarism, Federalism, Environmentalism	35,174 votes 6.6% of the electorate	2
Asturias Forum; Foro Asturias	Centre-right	Conservatism, Christian democracy, Regionalism	34,687 votes 6.5% of the electorate	2
Vox	Right-wing to far-right	Spanish nationalism, national conservatism, right-wing populism, social conservatism, economic liberalism, euroscepticism, anti-Islam, centralism	34,210 votes 6.4% of the electorate	2

== Political parties running for the Asturian general election, 2019 ==
- Animalist Party Against Mistreatment of Animals
- Equo
- Andecha Astur
- Communist Party of the Workers of Spain

== Other active political parties ==
Only parties with article at Wikipedia are included in this section.

- Asturian Left
- Asturian Renewal Union
- Communist Party of Asturias
- Commitment for Asturias
- Conceyu Abiertu
- Partíu Asturianista
- Unidá
