= 2023 Valencian regional election =

Election in the Spanish region of the Valencian Community

- 28 May 2023

All 99 seats in the Corts Valencianes 50 seats needed for a majority
- Opinion polls
- Registered: 3,730,659 ▲1.9%
- Turnout: 2,498,090 (67.0%) ▼6.7 pp
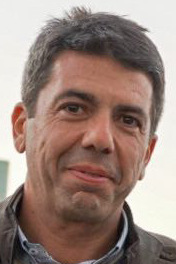

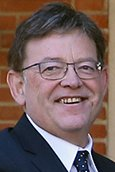

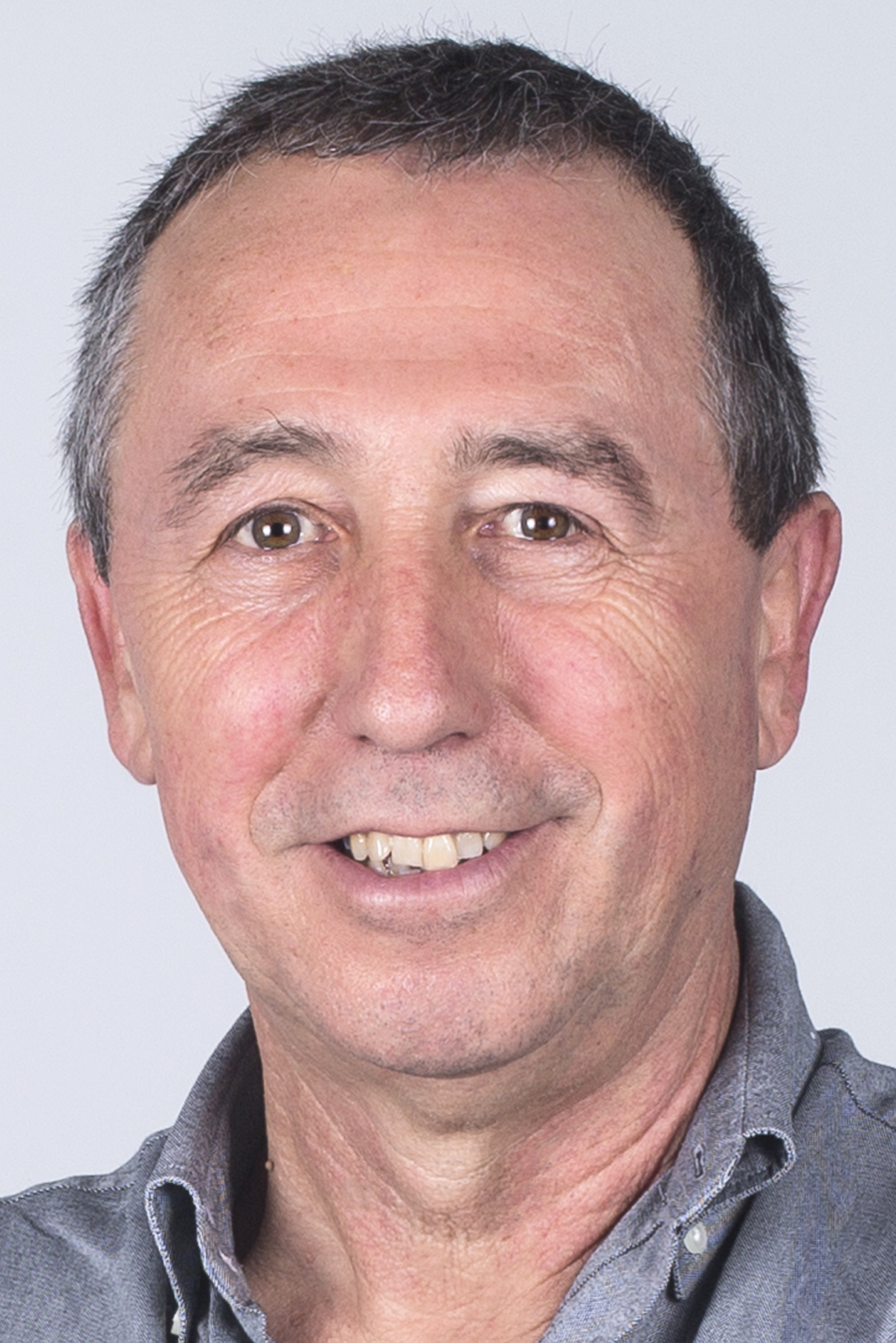

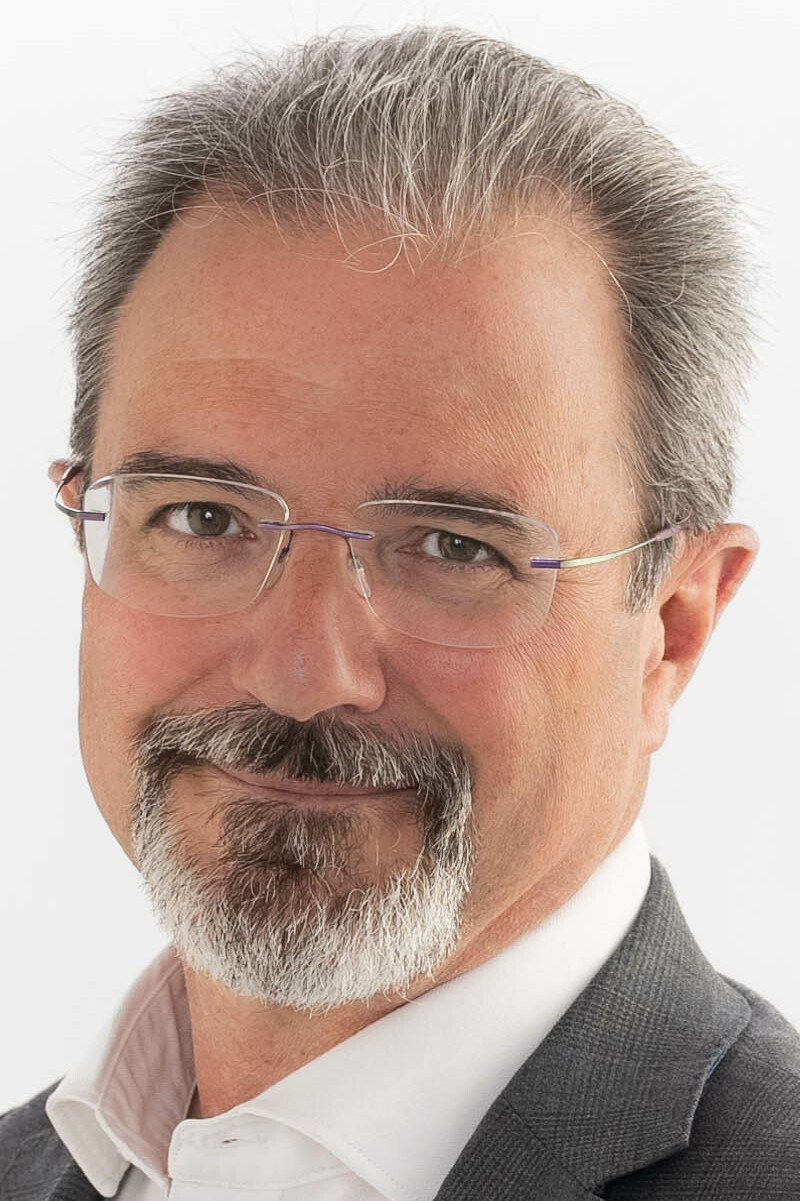

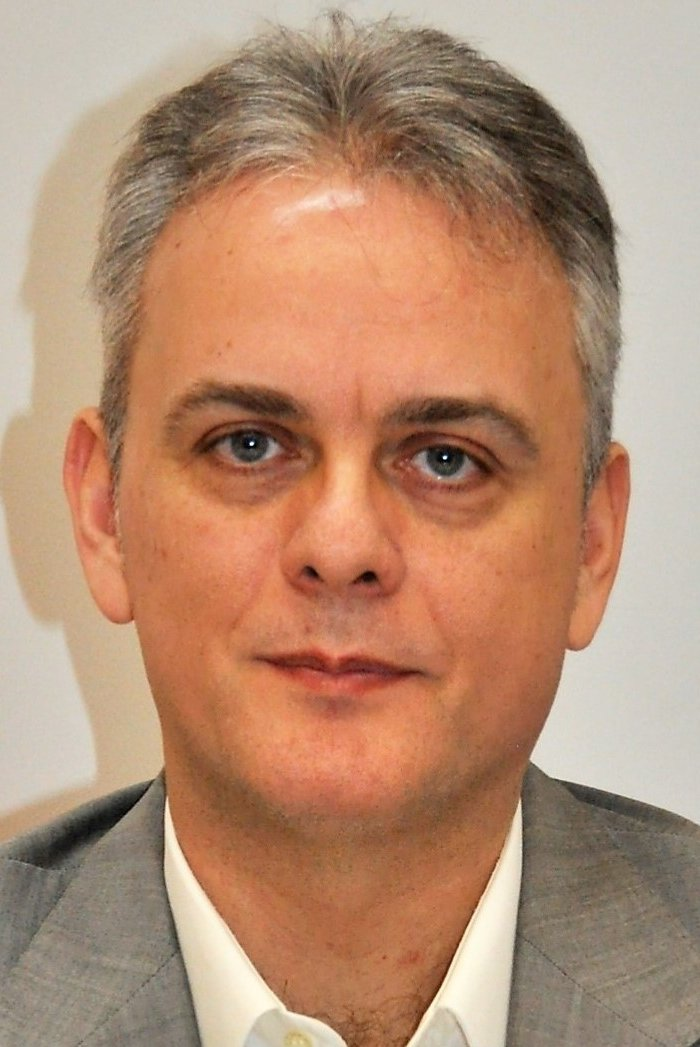

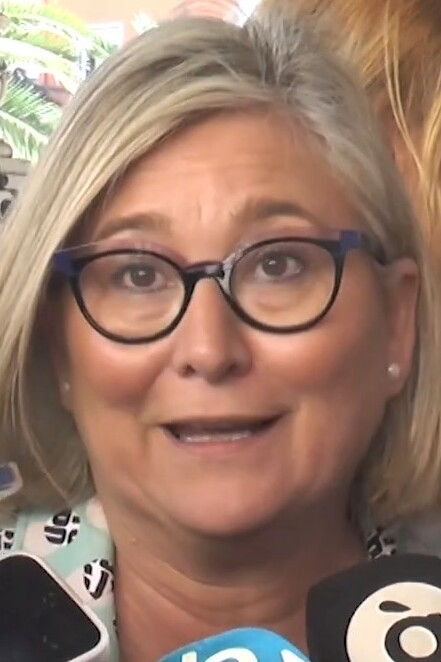
	First party	Second party	Third party
Leader	Carlos Mazón	Ximo Puig	Joan Baldoví
Party	PP	PSPV–PSOE	Compromís
Leader since	3 July 2021	31 March 2012	13 February 2023
Leader's seat	Alicante	Valencia	Valencia
Last election	19 seats, 19.1%	27 seats, 24.2%	17 seats, 16.7%
Seats won	40	31	15
Seat change	▲21	▲4	▼2
Popular vote	881,893	708,142	357,989
Percentage	35.7%	28.7%	14.5%
Swing	▲16.6 pp	▲4.5 pp	▼2.2 pp
	Fourth party	Fifth party	Sixth party
Leader	Carlos Flores	Héctor Illueca	Mamen Peris
Party	Vox	Unides Podem–EUPV	CS
Leader since	22 December 2022	4 November 2022	8 February 2023
Leader's seat	Valencia	Valencia (lost)	Valencia (lost)
Last election	10 seats, 10.6%	8 seats, 8.1%	18 seats, 17.7%
Seats won	13	0	0
Seat change	▲3	▼8	▼18
Popular vote	310,184	88,152	37,095
Percentage	12.6%	3.6%	1.5%
Swing	▲2.0 pp	▼4.5 pp	▼16.2 pp
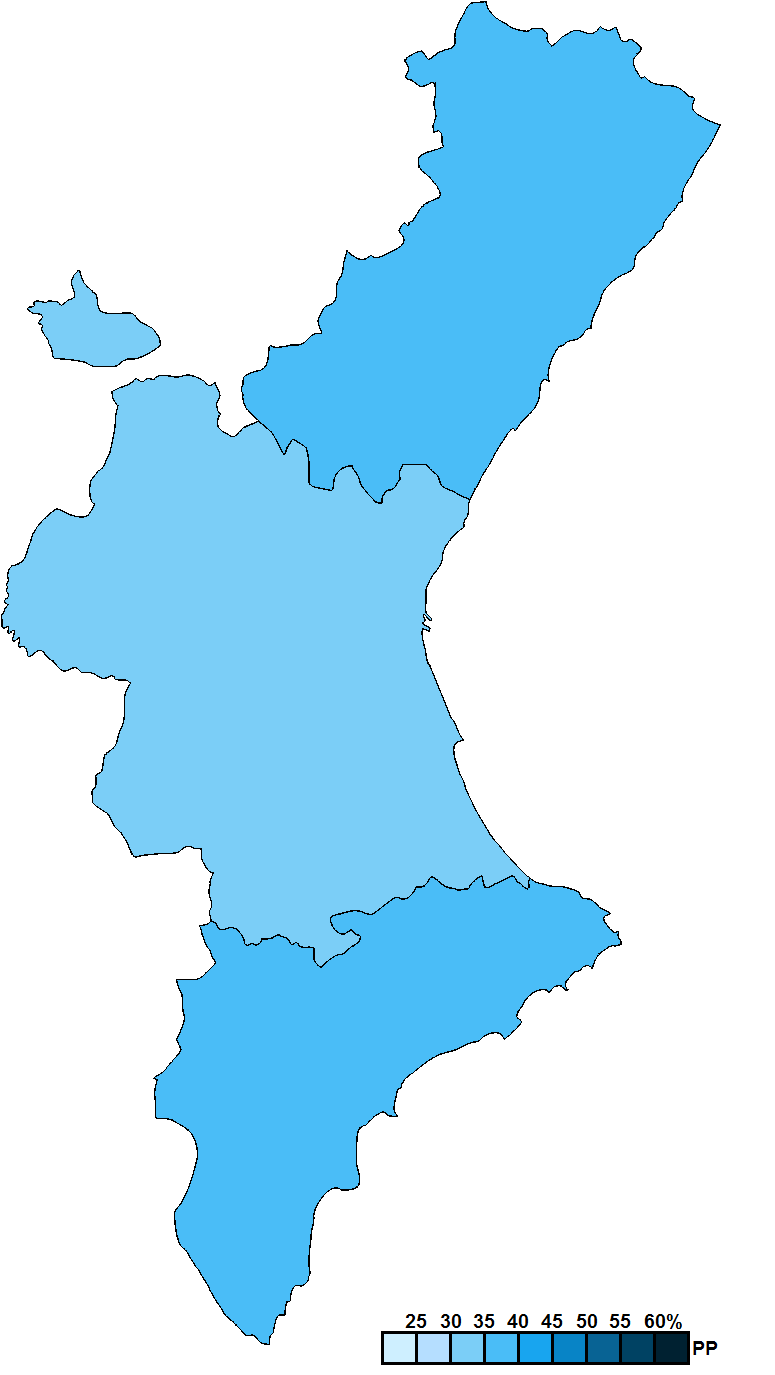
President before election
Ximo Puig
PSPV–PSOE
President after election
Carlos Mazón
PP

A regional election was held in the Valencian Community on 28 May 2023 to elect the 11th Corts of the autonomous community. All 99 seats in the Corts were up for election. It was held concurrently with regional elections in eleven other autonomous communities and local elections all across Spain.

The ruling "Botànic Agreement" of left-of-centre parties was re-elected in the 2019 election for a second term in office, albeit with a diminished majority of 52 to 47. Opinion polls held in the ensuing years saw a collapse of the vote for Citizens (Cs), particularly following the 2021 Madrilenian election, and its capitalization by both the People's Party (PP) and the far-right Vox party, to the point of putting at risk a new Botànic majority. The coalition government was further weakened by the resignation in June 2022 of Compromís figurehead Mónica Oltra as both cabinet member and deputy, following her being accused of negligence and concealment in an alleged case of sexual abuse of a minor under the protection of her ministry by her ex-husband. On the other hand, Ximo Puig's government was generally well-valued in opinion polls for its management of the COVID-19 pandemic, the economy and the political situation in the Valencian Community, which during this period saw the organization of the Benidorm Fest, the signing of a collaboration agreement with the Volkswagen Group for the development of a battery gigafactory in Sagunt and Ford's decision to equip its plant in Almussafes with the manufacture of electric cars.

The election saw a victory for the PP which, together with Vox, was able to command a majority of seats in the Corts. Puig's Socialist Party of the Valencian Country (PSPV) increased its vote share and seat count, but this was not enough to compensate for the loss of support of both Compromís and Unidas Podem, the latter of which failed to reach the minimum threshold. The collapse of Citizens (CS) helped fuel the PP's recovery. At 67.0%, turnout was the lowest ever for a Valencian regional election. As a result, PP's Carlos Mazón was able to get elected as new president of the Valencian Government through a coalition with Vox. This government would last until July 2024, when Vox leader Santiago Abascal forced the break up of all PP–Vox cabinets at the regional level over a national controversy regarding the distribution of unaccompanied migrant minors among the autonomous communities, after which the PP was left in minority.

== Overview ==
Under the 1982 Statute of Autonomy, the Corts Valencianes were the unicameral legislature of the Valencian Community, having legislative power in devolved matters, as well as the ability to grant or withdraw confidence from a regional president. The electoral and procedural rules were supplemented by national law provisions.

=== Date ===
The term of the Corts Valencianes expired four years after the date of their previous election, unless they were dissolved earlier. The election decree was required to be issued no later than 25 days before the scheduled expiration date of parliament and published on the following day in the Official Journal of the Valencian Government (DOGV), with election day taking place 54 days after the decree's publication. The previous election was held on 28 April 2019, which meant that the chamber's term would have expired on 28 April 2023. The election decree was required to be published in the DOGV no later than 4 April 2023, setting the latest possible date for election day on 28 May 2023.

The regional president had the prerogative to dissolve the Corts Valencianes at any given time and call a snap election, provided that no motion of no confidence was in process. In the event of an investiture process failing to elect a regional president within a two-month period from the first ballot, the Corts were to be automatically dissolved and a fresh election called.

Speculation emerged in late 2021 on possible snap elections in Andalusia and Castile and León to be held by the spring of 2022, it transpired that President Ximo Puig was evaluating the opportunity of a simultaneous early election in the Valencian Community in order to benefit from an improving economic outlook following the end of the 2020 COVID-19 pandemic-induced economic recession, as well as to counteract a favorable political climate for the PP with a possible victory in Andalusia. However, Puig publicly and repeatedly rejected the idea of advancing the election date, an opinion he reiterated after the Castile and León election was called for 13 February 2022, and the Andalusian election for 19 June. On 25 December 2022, Puig confirmed that the election would be held in May 2023, together with the regularly scheduled local and regional elections.

The Corts Valencianes were officially dissolved on 4 April 2023 with the publication of the corresponding decree in the DOGV, setting election day for 28 May and scheduling for the chamber to reconvene on 26 June.

=== Electoral system ===
Voting for the Corts was based on universal suffrage, comprising all Spanish nationals over 18 years of age, registered in the Valencian Community and with full political rights, provided that they had not been deprived of the right to vote by a final sentence. Amendments in 2022 abolished the "begged" voting system (Spanish: Voto rogado), under which non-resident citizens were required to apply for voting. The begged vote system was attributed responsibility for a major decrease in the turnout of Spaniards abroad during the years it was in force.

The Corts Valencianes had a minimum of 99 seats, with the electoral law fixing its size at that number. All were elected in three multi-member constituencies—corresponding to the provinces of Alicante, Castellón and Valencia, each of which was assigned an initial minimum of 20 seats and the remaining 39 distributed in proportion to population (with the seat-to-population ratio in any given province not exceeding three times that of any other)—using the D'Hondt method and closed-list proportional voting, with a five percent-threshold of valid votes (including blank ballots) regionally.

As a result of the aforementioned allocation, each Corts constituency was entitled the following seats:

Seats	Constituencies
40	Valencia
35	Alicante
24	Castellón

The law did not provide for by-elections to fill vacant seats; instead, any vacancies arising after the proclamation of candidates and during the legislative term were filled by the next candidates on the party lists or, when required, by designated substitutes.

=== Outgoing parliament ===
The table below shows the composition of the parliamentary groups in the chamber at the time of dissolution.

Parliamentary composition in April 2023
Groups	Parties	Legislators	
Groups	Parties	Seats	Total
Socialist Parliamentary Group	PSPV–PSOE	27	27
People's Parliamentary Group	PP	19	19
Commitment Parliamentary Group	Compromís	17	17
Citizens Parliamentary Group	CS	12	12
Vox Valencian Community Parliamentary Group	Vox	9	9
United We Can Parliamentary Group	Podemos	6	8
United We Can Parliamentary Group	EUPV	2	8
Non-Inscrits	PP	5 (Note: Jesús Salmerón, Cristina Gabarda, José Antonio Martínez and Sunsi Sanchis, former Cs legislators, joined the PP in September 2021.)	7
Non-Inscrits	INDEP	2 (Note: Vicente Fernández, former Cs legislator; Rebeca Serna, former Vox legislator.)	7

== Parties and candidates ==
The electoral law allowed for parties and federations registered in the interior ministry, alliances and groupings of electors to present lists of candidates. Parties and federations intending to form an alliance were required to inform the relevant electoral commission within 10 days of the election call, whereas groupings of electors needed to secure the signature of at least one percent of the electorate in the constituencies for which they sought election, disallowing electors from signing for more than one list. Additionally, a balanced composition of men and women was required in the electoral lists, so that candidates of either sex made up at least 40 percent of the total composition.

Below is a list of the main parties and alliances which contested the election:

Candidacy	Parties and alliances	Leading candidate	Ideology	Previous result		Gov.	Ref.
Candidacy	Parties and alliances	Leading candidate	Ideology	Vote %	Seats	Gov.	Ref.
PSPV–PSOE	List: Socialist Party of the Valencian Country (PSPV–PSOE)	Ximo Puig	Social democracy	24.2%	27	Yes	
PP	List: People's Party (PP)	Carlos Mazón	Conservatism; Christian democracy	19.1%	19	No	
CS	List: Citizens–Party of the Citizenry (CS)	Mamen Peris	Liberalism	17.7%	18	No	
Compromís	List: Més–Compromís (Més); Valencian People's Initiative (IdPV); Greens Equo of the Valencian Country (VerdsEquo)	Joan Baldoví	Valencianism; Progressivism; Green politics	16.7%	17	Yes	
Vox	List: Vox (Vox)	Carlos Flores	Right-wing populism Ultranationalism; National conservatism	10.6%	10	No	
Unides; Podem–EUPV	List: We Can (Podemos/Podem); United Left of the Valencian Country (EUPV) – Communist Party of the Valencian Country (PCPV) – The Dawn Marxist Organization (La Aurora (OM)) – Republican Left (IR)	Héctor Illueca	Left-wing populism Direct democracy Democratic socialism	8.1%	8	Yes	

== Campaign ==
=== Debates ===
2023 Valencian regional election debates
Date	Organizer(s)	Moderator(s)	P Present (Note: Denotes a main invitee attending the event.) S Surrogate (Note: Denotes a main invitee not attending the event, sending a surrogate in their place.) A Absent invitee							
Date	Organizer(s)	Moderator(s)	PSOE	PP	CS	Comp.	Vox	UP	Audience	Ref.
12 May	Cadena SER	Bernardo Guzmán	P Puig	P Mazón	P Peris	P Baldoví	P Flores	P Illueca	—	
18 May	COPE; Las Provincias	Vicente Ordaz	A	P Mazón	P Peris	A	P Flores	P Illueca	—	
25 May	À Punt	Marta Ventura; Mathies Muñoz	P Puig	P Mazón	P Peris	P Baldoví	P Flores	P Illueca	TBD	

== Opinion polls ==
The tables below list opinion polling results in reverse chronological order, showing the most recent first and using the dates when the survey fieldwork was done, as opposed to the date of publication. Where the fieldwork dates are unknown, the date of publication is given instead. The highest percentage figure in each polling survey is displayed with its background shaded in the leading party's colour. If a tie ensues, this is applied to the figures with the highest percentages. The "Lead" column on the right shows the percentage-point difference between the parties with the highest percentages in a poll.

=== Graphical summary ===
Local regression trend line of poll results from 28 April 2019 to 28 May 2023, with each line corresponding to a political party.

=== Voting intention estimates ===
The table below lists weighted voting intention estimates. Refusals are generally excluded from the party vote percentages, while question wording and the treatment of "don't know" responses and those not intending to vote may vary between polling organisations. When available, seat projections determined by the polling organisations are displayed below (or in place of) the percentages in a smaller font; 50 seats were required for an absolute majority in the Corts Valencianes.

Color key:

Poll conducted after legal ban on opinion polls

Polling firm/Commissioner	Fieldwork date	Sample size	Turnout	PSPV	PP	CS	Compromís	Vox	Unidas Podemos	Lead
2023 regional election	28 May 2023	—N/a	67.0	28.7; 31	35.7; 40	1.5; 0	14.5; 15	12.6; 13	3.6; 0	7.0
GAD3/RTVE–FORTA	12–27 May 2023	?	?	30.0; 31/33	34.3; 37/38	2.0; 0	13.4; 12/14	12.7; 13/14	5.0; 3	4.3
NC Report/La Razón	22 May 2023	?	?	27.8; 28/29	34.3; 37/38	–	13.5; 15/16	12.5; 14/15	5.3; 0/5	6.5
KeyData/Público	19 May 2023	?	?	26.0; 29	31.8; 35	2.7; 0	15.9; 16	15.1; 14	5.6; 5	5.8
Data10/Okdiario	17–19 May 2023	1,500	?	27.9; 31	32.7; 35	2.3; 0	13.9; 13	14.4; 15	5.9; 5	4.8
Target Point/El Debate	15–19 May 2023	902	?	25.9; 26/28	32.0; 34/35	2.2; 0	17.1; 16/18	14.8; 15/16	5.5; 3/5	6.1
IMOP/El Confidencial	15–19 May 2023	1,403	?	25.5; 28/29	32.8; 37/38	1.2; 0	18.3; 18	14.1; 15	4.6; 0	7.3
Sigma Dos/El Mundo	15–18 May 2023	1,600	?	24.7; 27/28	31.5; 33/35	2.1; 0	19.1; 17	15.6; 16	5.2; 3/5	6.8
40dB/Prisa	12–17 May 2023	1,200	?	25.6; 27/28	31.7; 34/36	3.7; 0	17.4; 17/18	13.3; 14/15	5.2; 0/5	6.1
EM-Analytics/El Plural	11–17 May 2023	600	?	27.6; 30	32.3; 35	2.8; 0	15.6; 14	15.5; 15	5.8; 5	4.7
Sigma Dos/Las Provincias	8–16 May 2023	1,648	?	24.5; 27/28	31.4; 34/35	2.7; 0	18.6; 16/19	15.8; 15/16	5.1; 4/5	6.9
DYM/Henneo	10–15 May 2023	2,028	?	26.5; 28/29	32.0; 34/35	3.0; 0	16.6; 16/18	14.2; 14/15	6.5; 3/6	5.5
SocioMétrica/El Español	8–14 May 2023	?	?	25.2; 27/28	31.5; 35/36	3.0; 0	15.8; 14/16	15.4; 15/16	5.9; 5	6.3
Invest Group/Levante-EMV	2–11 May 2023	1,500	71.5	27.3; 29/31	33.9; 36	2.1; 0	12.2; 13/14	12.5; 13/14	7.0; 6/7	6.6
EM-Analytics/El Plural	4–10 May 2023	600	?	27.9; 30	32.5; 35	2.9; 0	15.2; 14	15.5; 15	5.7; 5	4.6
GAD3/ABC	27 Apr–8 May 2023	1,203	?	29.5; 31/33	32.6; 35/36	2.1; 0	13.2; 12/13	14.4; 14/15	5.2; 4/5	3.1
SocioMétrica	5 May 2023	?	?	25.3; 28/30	31.6; 34/36	3.2; 0	15.2; 15	16.0; 16/17	5.7; 0/5	6.3
Demoscopia y Servicios/ESdiario	2–5 May 2023	1,200	?	27.5; 30	33.2; 36	2.6; 0	13.8; 13	14.7; 15	5.6; 5	4.7
Simple Lógica/elDiario.es	24 Apr–4 May 2023	900	?	25.3; 28/29	28.6; 32/33	3.6; 0	18.3; 17/18	14.5; 15/16	6.7; 5	3.3
40dB/Prisa	28 Apr–3 May 2023	1,200	?	25.9; 30/31	31.1; 33/35	3.3; 0	15.5; 16/17	14.9; 13/14	5.3; 5	5.2
EM-Analytics/El Plural	26 Apr–3 May 2023	600	?	27.9; 30	32.5; 35	2.8; 0	15.3; 14	15.4; 15	5.7; 5	4.6
Sigma Dos/Antena 3	26 Apr 2023	?	?	27.1; 28/30	31.9; 36/38	3.1; 0	15.9; 16	14.9; 13/14	5.0; 4	4.8
CIS	10–26 Apr 2023	2,630	?	29.0; 30/34	30.7; 31/36	2.1; 0	18.5; 15/19	10.2; 8/12	6.0; 2/5	1.7
EM-Analytics/El Plural	19–25 Apr 2023	600	?	? 30	? 35	? 0	? 14	? 15	? 5	?
Sonmerca/PSPV	21 Apr 2023	1,200	?	31.5; 33/36	32.5; 35/37	2.0; 0	14.5; 13/14	10.0; 9/10	6.0; 5/6	1.0
EM-Analytics/El Plural	12–18 Apr 2023	600	?	26.9; 29	32.2; 35	2.7; 0	14.5; 14	15.7; 16	6.7; 5	5.3
Data10/Okdiario	11–14 Apr 2023	1,500	?	28.8; 31	32.7; 37	2.4; 0	12.9; 12	14.4; 14	5.9; 5	3.9
NC Report/La Razón	7–14 Apr 2023	?	70.1	23.6; 27	33.6; 37	3.4; 0	15.2; 15	15.1; 15	6.1; 5	10.0
EM-Analytics/El Plural	5–11 Apr 2023	600	?	27.0; 29	31.9; 34	2.5; 0	14.0; 13	16.4; 17	7.0; 6	4.9
SocioMétrica/El Español	3–7 Apr 2023	1,200	?	24.9; 26/27	31.6; 35/37	3.3; 0	15.2; 15	15.4; 16/17	6.3; 5	6.7
Sigma Dos/El Mundo	27 Mar–4 Apr 2023	2,349	?	25.1; 25/28	31.5; 32/35	2.3; 0	19.2; 17/20	15.0; 13/16	5.5; 4	6.4
EM-Analytics/El Plural	27 Mar–4 Apr 2023	600	?	26.6; 28	32.4; 35	2.5; 0	13.8; 13	16.5; 17	7.1; 6	5.8
KeyData/Público	15 Mar 2023	?	71.3	26.4; 30	31.4; 35	2.2; 0	15.9; 15	14.9; 15	5.1; 4	5.0
PP	13 Mar 2023	?	?	? 29	? 35	? 0	? 14	? 16	? 5	?
GfK/Compromís	23 Feb–7 Mar 2023	1,361	?	25.0– 26.0	31.0– 32.0	3.0– 4.0	18.0– 20.0	12.0– 14.0	4.0– 5.0	6.0
Sigma Dos/Todo Alicante	20–28 Feb 2023	1,103	?	25.6; 28/29	31.9; 34/36	3.1; 0	15.9; 14/16	16.3; 15	5.6; 5	6.3
Data10/Okdiario	15–17 Feb 2023	1,500	69	29.7; 33	32.6; 35	2.4; 0	11.6; 11	13.7; 14	6.4; 6	2.9
Target Point/El Debate	12–15 Feb 2023	1,000	?	24.2; 26/27	30.9; 34/35	2.3; 0	17.4; 16/18	16.5; 15/17	6.0; 5	6.7
PSPV	7 Feb 2023	?	?	? 34/37	? 34/37	? 0	? 14/16	? 10/12	? 0/6	Tie
CIS (Note: Vote+Simpathy figures with undecided and/or abstentionists excluded.)	17 Nov–2 Dec 2022	994	?	31.0; 32/45	29.2; 31/43	3.2; 0/5	11.9; 6/12	9.5; 4/11	7.2; 2/6	1.8
Sigma Dos/El Mundo	13 Nov 2022	?	?	26.4; 28	29.2; 31	3.1; 0	15.9; 17	16.2; 17	6.2; 6	2.8
Data10/Okdiario	2–4 Nov 2022	1,000	?	28.5; 30	32.4; 36	1.9; 0	10.8; 12	15.2; 15	7.4; 6	3.9
SocioMétrica/El Español	3–7 Oct 2022	1,200	?	26.7; 29/30	29.9; 33/34	2.9; 0	13.9; 12/13	17.4; 17/18	6.7; 5/6	3.2
Demoscopia y Servicios/ESdiario	3–5 Oct 2022	1,800	67.3	28.8; 31	31.9; 35	2.1; 0	10.3; 10	15.5; 16	7.3; 7	3.1
GESOP/Prensa Ibérica	20 Sep–1 Oct 2022	1,510	?	28.3; 31/32	30.2; 33/35	2.9; 0	15.3; 14/16	11.9; 13	6.1; 5	1.9
PP	29 Sep 2022	?	?	27.0; 28/29	32.0; 33/34	3.0; 0	12.0; 13/14	16.0; 17/18	6.0; 5/6	5.0
SyM Consulting/EPDA	24 Apr–14 Sep 2022	2,447	67.3	23.9; 25/26	29.4; 30/32	1.3; 0	17.7; 17/18	14.7; 15/16	9.4; 9/10	5.5
PSPV	31 Jun–15 Jul 2022	706	?	31.2; 34/36	25.9; 32/34	2.6; 0	12.8; 14/16	10.6; 10/12	3.8; 0/5	5.3
EM-Analytics/Electomanía	26 Jun–5 Jul 2022	1,243	?	24.8; 27	29.4; 32	2.4; 0	14.5; 14	18.6; 20	7.2; 6	4.6
SocioMétrica/El Español	22–25 Jun 2022	900	?	25.0; 27	31.4; 35	2.7; 0	11.9; 10	17.9; 19	7.8; 8	6.4
Demoscopia y Servicios/ESdiario	22–23 Jun 2022	1,000	67.3	29.0; 31	31.9; 35	2.3; 0	9.6; 9	15.8; 17	7.2; 7	2.9
Demoscopia y Servicios/ESdiario	23–25 May 2022	1,800	74.0	27.7; 31	27.5; 29	3.2; 0	14.1; 14	18.7; 20	5.7; 5	0.2
Sigma Dos/Las Provincias	9–17 May 2022	1,200	?	27.2; 29/30	26.5; 27/30	5.0; 4/5	16.5; 15/17	15.2; 16	6.4; 5	0.7
Sigma Dos/El Mundo	14–28 Dec 2021	1,700	?	28.3; 30/32	27.6; 30/31	4.5; 0/2	14.7; 14	14.9; 15/16	7.5; 6/7	0.7
EM-Analytics/Electomanía	15 Dec 2021	?	?	25.0; 28	28.5; 32	3.0; 0	16.0; 15	16.3; 17	7.5; 7	3.5
NC Report/La Razón	2–12 Nov 2021	1,000	67.6	24.1; 26/27	29.3; 30/31	5.2; 4	15.0; 15/16	15.9; 15/16	7.2; 7	5.2
GAD3/Cs	15 Oct–4 Nov 2021	2,404	?	29.2; 31/32	28.1; 30/31	5.9; 5	13.1; 12/13	14.8; 15	5.3; 4/5	1.1
Electocracia	21–26 Oct 2021	1,000	?	25.8; 27/28	28.6; 31/32	3.1; 0	15.9; 16/17	16.5; 18/19	6.6; 5/6	2.8
PP	3 Oct 2021	?	?	? 27/30	? 27/30	? 0	? 14/15	? 20/21	? 7	Tie
Demoscopia y Servicios/ESdiario	28 Sep–1 Oct 2021	1,800	?	26.7; 30	27.8; 31	3.0; 0	15.7; 14	18.2; 19	5.9; 5	1.1
SyM Consulting/EPDA	28–30 Sep 2021	1,565	70.4	24.5; 26/28	29.5; 30/33	2.0; 0	17.1; 17	15.9; 17	6.5; 7/8	5.0
Invest Group/Prensa Ibérica	20–29 Sep 2021	750	?	31.3; 36	21.6; 24	3.4; 0	15.4; 16	12.8; 13	9.2; 10	9.7
Terreta Radio	14 Sep 2021	?	?	? 28	? 28	? 2	? 15	? 22	? 4	Tie
EM-Analytics/Electomanía	31 Jul 2021	?	?	27.1; 30	26.9; 30	3.3; 0	15.9; 16	15.9; 16	7.8; 7	0.9
SyM Consulting/EPDA	14–18 Jul 2021	1,066	71.3	24.4; 26/27	26.3; 28/29	5.2; 3	17.0; 17	15.7; 15/18	8.0; 7/8	1.9
Demoscopia y Servicios/ESdiario	21–30 Jun 2021	1,800	?	26.6; 29	27.0; 30	3.4; 0	16.1; 16	17.6; 19	6.1; 5	0.4
EM-Analytics/Electomanía	30 Apr 2021	850	?	28.1; 32	25.6; 30	4.5; 0	16.6; 16	13.5; 13	8.1; 8	2.5
Sigma Dos/Las Provincias	12–17 Apr 2021	1,200	?	29.7; 31/33	24.9; 27	6.0; 5	16.4; 15/17	13.6; 13/14	6.3; 5/6	4.8
Metroscopia/PP	8–13 Apr 2021	1,500	?	28.0; 29/31	28.2; 30/31	2.3; 0	13.3; 12/14	17.8; 18/19	7.5; 7/8	0.2
Demoscopia y Servicios/ESdiario	1–5 Mar 2021	1,800	?	28.4; 31	22.2; 23	7.0; 6	15.5; 15	17.6; 19	6.9; 5	6.2
GAD3/Cs	14–20 Oct 2020	1,002	?	31.3; 33/34	24.2; 25/27	11.8; 12	11.2; 10	12.0; 12/13	6.1; 5	7.1
Demoscopia y Servicios/ESdiario	1–7 Oct 2020	1,800	?	27.4; 29	24.7; 26	7.9; 8	17.3; 17	13.4; 14	7.0; 5	2.7
Invest Group/Prensa Ibérica	28 Sep–5 Oct 2020	750	?	32.7; 36	19.6; 21	7.5; 7	14.8; 15	11.1; 11	9.9; 9	13.1
SyM Consulting/EPDA	24–27 Sep 2020	1,706	73.2	23.6; 25/26	18.4; 19/20	9.5; 7/8	16.8; 17/18	16.8; 18	11.8; 10/12	5.2
ElectoPanel/Electomanía	31 Jul 2020	850	?	25.8; 27	23.9; 26	9.0; 9	16.6; 16	12.8; 13	7.8; 8	1.9
Demoscopia y Servicios/ESdiario	17–20 Jun 2020	1,000	65.7	27.3; 28	25.6; 27	6.8; 8	16.7; 15	12.8; 13	8.3; 8	1.7
SyM Consulting	19–21 May 2020	1,695	72.6	24.6; 25/26	23.4; 25/26	12.0; 11	15.1; 14/15	13.9; 14/16	7.4; 7/8	1.2
ElectoPanel/Electomanía	1 Apr–15 May 2020	?	?	26.2; 27	23.6; 25	8.8; 9	16.3; 16	12.6; 13	8.4; 9	2.6
November 2019 general election	10 Nov 2019	—N/a	69.8	27.6 (31)	23.0 (24)	7.7 (7)	7.0 (5)	18.5 (19)	13.4 (13)	4.6
Invest Group/Prensa Ibérica	23 Sep–1 Oct 2019	900	?	32.6; 35	21.8; 22	10.0; 10	16.5; 18	8.7; 8	7.4; 6	10.8
2019 EP election	26 May 2019	—N/a	62.5	33.0 (36)	22.6 (25)	14.3 (15)	8.4 (7)	7.2 (7)	9.7 (9)	10.4
2019 regional election	28 Apr 2019	—N/a	73.7	24.2; 27	19.1; 19	17.7; 18	16.7; 17	10.6; 10	8.1; 8	5.1

=== Voting preferences ===
The table below lists raw, unweighted voting preferences.

Polling firm/Commissioner	Fieldwork date	Sample size	PSPV	PP	CS	Compromís	Vox	Unidas Podemos	Question	X mark	Lead
2023 regional election (Note: Does not include non-resident citizens.)	28 May 2023	—N/a	19.3	24.1	1.0	9.8	8.5	2.4	—N/a	30.6	4.8
40dB/Prisa	12–17 May 2023	1,200	19.7	21.3	3.2	13.8	12.1	4.2	14.7	5.8	1.6
40dB/Prisa	26 Apr–3 May 2023	1,200	22.5	17.9	2.8	11.8	12.5	4.1	17.1	5.4	4.6
CIS	10–26 Apr 2023	2,630	20.9	21.9	0.9	13.6	7.6	4.3	25.0	2.1	1.0
Sonmerca/PSPV	21 Apr 2023	1,200	31.3	27.7	0.9	7.5	4.7	4.3	16.2	3.3	3.6
40dB/UP	23–28 Mar 2023	1,500	19.3	17.8	–	10.9	12.6	6.8	–	–	1.5
CIS	17 Nov–2 Dec 2022	994	20.7	19.5	1.3	8.1	6.4	4.4	31.0	3.8	1.2
GESOP/Prensa Ibérica	20 Sep–1 Oct 2022	1,510	16.8	13.2	0.8	7.8	4.5	2.8	43.0	7.2	3.6
November 2019 general election	10 Nov 2019	—N/a	19.6	16.4	5.5	4.9	13.1	9.5	—N/a	28.3	3.2
2019 EP election	26 May 2019	—N/a	21.2	14.5	9.2	5.4	4.6	6.2	—N/a	35.2	6.7
2019 regional election	28 Apr 2019	—N/a	18.1	14.3	13.2	12.5	7.9	6.0	—N/a	24.2	3.8

=== Victory preferences ===
The table below lists opinion polling on the victory preferences for each party in the event of a regional election taking place.

Polling firm/Commissioner	Fieldwork date	Sample size	PSPV	PP	CS	Compromís	Vox	Unidas Podemos	Other/ None	Question	Lead
Invest Group/Levante-EMV	2–11 May 2023	1,500	24.4	28.2	1.3	9.0	8.5	4.8	23.8		3.8
GESOP/Prensa Ibérica	20 Sep–1 Oct 2022	1,510	32.0	30.9	–	–	–	–	4.1	33.0	1.1
Invest Group/Prensa Ibérica	20–29 Sep 2021	750	25.7	14.5	2.1	11.5	9.1	5.3	3.4	28.4	11.2
Invest Group/Prensa Ibérica	28 Sep–5 Oct 2020	750	22.3	13.1	5.5	10.4	7.2	6.5	24.0	11.0	9.2

=== Victory likelihood ===
The table below lists opinion polling on the perceived likelihood of victory for each party in the event of a regional election taking place.

Polling firm/Commissioner	Fieldwork date	Sample size	PSPV	PP	CS	Compromís	Vox	Unidas Podemos	Other/ None	Question	Lead
Invest Group/Levante-EMV	2–11 May 2023	1,500	32.2	38.0	0.7	3.7	4.1	1.3	20.0		5.8
Sonmerca/PSPV	21 Apr 2023	1,200	44.4	32.4	0.2	1.8	0.8	0.3	0.2	19.9	12.0

=== Preferred President ===
The table below lists opinion polling on leader preferences to become president of the Valencian Government.

Polling firm/Commissioner	Fieldwork date	Sample size												Other/ None/ Not care	Question	Lead
Polling firm/Commissioner	Fieldwork date	Sample size	Puig PSPV	Mazón PP	Merino CS	Peris CS	Oltra Compromís	Baldoví Compromís	Llanos Vox	Vega Vox	Flores Vox	Lima UP	Illueca UP	Other/ None/ Not care	Question	Lead
40dB/Prisa	12–17 May 2023	1,200	24.8	21.3	–	3.4	–	15.6	–	–	12.0	–	2.8	8.8	11.3	3.5
40dB/Prisa	26 Apr–3 May 2023	1,200	26.5	19.0	–	3.3	–	15.6	–	–	11.5	–	2.2	11.8	10.0	7.5
Sonmerca/PSPV	21 Apr 2023	1,200	39.0	19.4	–	0.7	–	9.1	–	–	2.7	–	2.5	–	26.4	19.6
SocioMétrica/El Español	3–7 Apr 2023	1,200	31.0	29.6	–	4.1	–	15.5	–	–	12.1	–	7.7	–	–	1.4
PSPV	16 Mar 2023	?	40.0	20.0	–	–	–	–	–	–	–	–	–	–	–	20.0
SocioMétrica/El Español	3–7 Oct 2022	1,200	30.9	28.7	–	5.4	–	14.1	14.3	–	–	6.6	–	–	–	2.2
GESOP/Prensa Ibérica	20 Sep–1 Oct 2022	1,510	46.1	15.9	–	–	–	–	–	–	–	–	–	38.0		30.2
SyM Consulting/EPDA	28–30 Sep 2021	1,565	25.3	27.6	3.5	–	19.2	–	–	14.4	–	4.3	–	–	5.7	2.3
SyM Consulting/EPDA	14–18 Jul 2021	1,066	25.7	25.2	3.8	–	18.8	–	–	10.4	–	9.0	–	–	7.1	0.5

=== Predicted President ===
The table below lists opinion polling on the perceived likelihood for each leader to become president.

Polling firm/Commissioner	Fieldwork date	Sample size							Other/ None/ Not care	Question	Lead
Polling firm/Commissioner	Fieldwork date	Sample size	Puig PSPV	Mazón PP	Merino CS	Oltra Compromís	Vega Vox	Lima UP	Other/ None/ Not care	Question	Lead
SyM Consulting/EPDA	28–30 Sep 2021	1,565	42.6	35.4	0.1	5.8	4.4	0.1	–	11.6	7.2
SyM Consulting/EPDA	14–18 Jul 2021	1,066	46.7	30.3	1.5	7.1	4.4	2.6	–	7.3	16.4

== Results ==
=== Overall ===
← Summary of the 28 May 2023 Corts Valencianes election results →
Parties and alliances	Popular vote			Seats	
Parties and alliances	Votes	%	±pp	Total	+/−
People's Party (PP)	881,893	35.75	+16.63	40	+21
Socialist Party of the Valencian Country (PSPV–PSOE)	708,142	28.70	+4.49	31	+4
Commitment: Més–Initiative–Greens Equo (Compromís)	357,989	14.51	−2.17	15	−2
Vox (Vox)	310,184	12.57	+1.98	13	+3
United We Can–United Left (Unides Podem–EUPV)	88,152	3.57	−4.53	0	−8
Citizens–Party of the Citizenry (CS)	37,095	1.50	−16.20	0	−18
Animalist Party with the Environment (PACMA)^{1}	20,836	0.84	−0.61	0	±0
The Eco-pacifist Greens (Centro Moderado)^{2}	4,846	0.20	−0.12	0	±0
Republican Left of the Valencian Country (ERPV)	4,570	0.19	±0.00	0	±0
United Coalition (Units)	4,266	0.17	New	0	±0
Communist Party of the Peoples of Spain (PCPE)	3,815	0.15	−0.02	0	±0
Zero Cuts (Recortes Cero)	2,926	0.12	New	0	±0
Decide (Decidix)	2,373	0.10	New	0	±0
Blank Seats to Leave Empty Seats (EB)	2,090	0.08	New	0	±0
Valencian Republic–European Valencianist Party (RV–PVE)	1,745	0.07	−0.01	0	±0
Alliance for the Commerce and Housing (AlianzaCV)	1,689	0.07	New	0	±0
For a Fairer World (PUM+J)	1,373	0.06	New	0	±0
Centered in Our Land (Centrats)	1,326	0.05	New	0	±0
Regionalist Alicantine Party–Citizen Hope (PAR–EsC)	641	0.03	New	0	±0
Blank ballots	31,035	1.26	+0.50		
Total	2,466,986			99	±0
Valid votes	2,466,986	98.75	+0.17		
Invalid votes	31,104	1.25	−0.17		
Votes cast / turnout	2,498,090	66.96	−6.76		
Abstentions	1,232,569	33.04	+6.76		
Registered voters	3,730,659				
Sources
Footnotes: ^{1} Animalist Party with the Environment results are compared to Animalist Party Against Mistreatment of Animals totals in the 2019 election.; ^{2} The Eco-pacifist Greens results are compared to Forward–The Eco-pacifist Greens totals in the 2019 election.

Popular vote
PP	35.75%
PSPV–PSOE	28.70%
Compromís	14.51%
Vox	12.57%
U. Podem–EUPV	3.57%
CS	1.50%
Others	2.13%
Blank ballots	1.26%

Seats
PP	40.40%
PSPV–PSOE	31.31%
Compromís	15.15%
Vox	13.13%

=== Distribution by constituency ===
Constituency	PP		PSPV		Compr.		Vox	
Constituency	%	S	%	S	%	S	%	S
Alicante	39.3	15	29.5	11	10.2	4	12.3	5
Castellón	36.0	10	30.2	8	13.1	3	13.1	3
Valencia	33.6	15	27.9	12	17.4	8	12.6	5
Total	35.7	40	28.7	31	14.5	15	12.6	13

== Aftermath ==
=== Government formation ===
Investiture; Nomination of Carlos Mazón (PP)
Ballot →	13 July 2023
Required majority →	50 out of 99
Yes: • PP (40); • Vox (13)	53 / 99
No: • PSPV (31); • Compromís (15)	46 / 99
Abstentions	0 / 99
Absentees	0 / 99

=== 2025 investiture ===
Investiture; Nomination of Juanfran Pérez Llorca (PP)
Ballot →	27 November 2025
Required majority →	50 out of 99
Yes: • PP (40); • Vox (13)	53 / 99
No: • PSPV (30); • Compromís (15)	45 / 99
Abstentions	0 / 99
Absentees: • PSPV (1)	1 / 99

== Bibliography ==
- Ley 5/1983, de 30 de diciembre, del Consell (Law 5/1983). Official State Gazette (in Spanish). 30 December 1983 [version as of 23 March 2007]. BOE-A-1984-3460.
- Ley Orgánica 5/1985, de 19 de junio, del Régimen Electoral General (Organic Law 5/1985). Official State Gazette (in Spanish). 19 June 1985 [version as of 3 October 2022]. BOE-A-1985-11672.
- Ley 1/1987, de 31 de marzo, Electoral Valenciana (Law 1/1987). Official State Gazette (in Spanish). 31 March 1987 [version as of 6 April 1987]. BOE-A-1987-9636.
- Ley Orgánica 1/2006, de 10 de abril, de Reforma de la Ley Orgánica 5/1982, de 1 de julio, de Estatuto de Autonomía de la Comunidad Valenciana (Organic Law 1/2006). Official State Gazette (in Spanish). 10 April 2006 [version as of 28 December 2022]. BOE-A-1982-17235.
- Decreto 3/2023, de 3 de abril, del president de la Generalitat, de disolución de las Corts y de convocatoria de elecciones a estas (PDF) (Decree 3/2023). Official Journal of the Valencian Government (in Spanish). 3 April 2023.
