= 2024 Delaware elections =

- November 5, 2024

A general election was held in the U.S. state of Delaware on November 5, 2024, concurrently with other nationwide elections, including for President of the United States. Half of Delaware's executive officers were up for election, including the Governorship. Additionally, federal elections for the state's Class 2 seat in the United States Senate seat and Delaware's at-large congressional district in the United States House of Representatives. Primary elections were held on September 10, 2024.

Democrats, who historically dominate the state politically, won all statewide elections and did well in down ballot races. With the exception of statewide races, most candidates ran unopposed, including around half running for Delaware House of Representatives and all but two running for the Delaware Senate. The election had a turnout rate of 65.74% of registered voters casting ballots across 533 precincts.

== Background ==
The Delaware Democratic Party dominates the politics of Delaware. The party holds a supermajority in both chambers of the State Legislature and holds all statewide seats. The most recent time Republicans won statewide elections in Delaware was in 2014, when the elections for Delaware Auditor of Accounts and Delaware State Treasurer were won by Tom Wagner and Ken Simpler respectively. In 2018, Wagner did not seek reelection while Simpler was defeated by a Democratic challenger.

== Federal elections ==
=== President ===
Incumbent President Joe Biden was the only Democrat to qualify for the 2024 Democratic Party presidential primary in Delaware. After Nikki Haley suspended her primary campaign for the Republican presidential nomination, Donald Trump became the presumptive nominee. However, Haley dropped out too late to remove her name from the primary ballot, so the Delaware Legislature voted to cancel the Presidential primaries as a cost saving measure.

Democratic presidential candidate Vice President Kamala Harris won Delaware with 56.6 percent of the popular vote, winning all three of the state's electoral votes. Despite her win in Delaware, Harris lost the presidential election to Trump.

2024 United States presidential election in Delaware
Party	Candidate	Votes	%
Democratic	Kamala Harris	289,758	56.6
Republican	Donald Trump	214,351	41.9
Independent	Robert F. Kennedy Jr.	4,636	0.9
Libertarian	Chase Oliver	2,038	0.4
Conservative	Vermin Supreme	914	0.2
Total votes		511,697	100.00
Democratic win			

=== Senate ===
In May 2023, incumbent Democratic Senator Tom Carper revealed that he would not be seeking reelection. Carper endorsed Representative Lisa Blunt Rochester of Delaware's at-large congressional district to succeed him. Rochester won the election with 56.6 percent of the vote. She became Delaware's first female and first black senator.

2024 United States Senate election in Delaware
Party	Candidate	Votes	%
Democratic	Lisa Blunt Rochester	283,298	56.6
Republican	Eric Hansen	197,753	39.5
Independent Party	Michael Katz	19,555	3.9
Total votes		490,935	100.00
Democratic hold			

=== House of Representatives ===
Lisa Blunt Rochester, the incumbent Representative for Delaware's at-large congressional district decided not to seek re-election opting to run for United States Senate. State Senator Sarah McBride decided to run to replace her. McBride won the election with 57.9 percent of the vote. With her victory, she became the first openly transgender person elected to the United States Congress. After the election, McBride resigned from her State Senate seat.

2024 United States House of Representatives election in Delaware
Party	Candidate	Votes	%
Democratic	Sarah McBride	287,830	57.9
Republican	John Whalen	209,606	42.1
Total votes		497,436	100.00
Democratic hold			

== State elections ==
=== Governor ===
Incumbent Governor John Carney was unable to seek a third term due to term limits. Democratic New Castle County Executive Matt Meyer ran for the seat against Republican House Minority Leader Mike Ramone. Meyer defeated Ramone with 56.1% of the vote.

2024 Delaware gubernatorial election
Party	Candidate	Votes	%
Democratic	Matt Meyer	279,585	56.1
Republican	Mike Ramone	219,050	43.9
Total votes		498,635	100.00
Democratic hold			

=== Lieutenant governor ===
Democratic State Senator Kyle Evans Gay and former Republican State Representative Ruth Briggs King ran for the open seat left by Bethany Hall-Long. Gay won the race, receiving around 55 percent of the vote. Following her victory, Gay resigned from her State Senate seat.

2024 Delaware lieutenant gubernatorial election
Party	Candidate	Votes	%
Democratic	Kyle Evans Gay	272,828	55.22
Republican	Ruth Briggs King	221,256	44.78
Total votes		494,084	100.00
Democratic hold			

=== Insurance Commissioner ===
Results by county Navarro: 50–60%; 60–70%; Pillsbury: 50–60%

Incumbent Democratic Trinidad Navarro won a third term as Insurance Commissioner of Delaware against Republican challenger Ralph Taylor. Navarro won with almost 60 percent of the vote.

2024 Delaware Insurance Commissioner election
Party	Candidate	Votes	%
Democratic	Trinidad Navarro (incumbent)	286,743	59.48
Republican	Julia M. Pillsbury	195,305	40.52
Total votes		482,048	100.00
Democratic hold			

=== General Assembly ===
The Democratic Party defended its majorities in both the Delaware Senate and the Delaware House of Representatives. All incumbent state senators up for reelection won. The majority of Senate candidates ran unopposed, with only Democrats Russell Huxtable and Darius J. Brown facing challengers. 21 candidates running for the State House of Representatives faced challengers while 20 did not.

All incumbent State Representatives running for reelection won. Democrats expanded their majority, flipping the seat previously held by Republican House Minority Leader Mike Ramone, who decided against running for reelection in favor of a gubernatorial bid.

Senate
Party	Before	After	Change
Democratic	15	15	Steady
Republican	6	6	Steady
Total	21	21	

House of Representatives
Party	Before	After	Change
Democratic	26	27	▲1
Republican	15	14	▼1
Total	41	41	

== Local ==
=== New Castle County Executive ===
Incumbent New Castle County Executive Matt Meyer opted against a reelection bid to run for Governor instead. Marcus Henry and New Castle County Council President Karen Hartley-Nagle ran for the Democratic nomination for New Castle County Executive. On the day of the primary, Henry defeated Hartley-Nagle by a 21-point margin. Republican Carter Hill filed to run but withdrew his candidacy before the election. Henry won the general election unopposed.

2024 New Castle County Executive election
Party	Candidate	Votes	%
Democratic	Marcus Henry	204,846	100.00%
Total votes		204,846	100.00%
Democratic hold			

=== Kent County Levy Court ===
All three of the Kent County Levy Court seats up were won by Democrats; all three of them ran unopposed. Democrats successfully defended their 5-2 majority over Republicans.

Kent County Levy Court
Party	Before	After	Change
Democratic	5	5	Steady
Republican	2	2	Steady
Total	7	7	

=== New Castle County Council ===
All six of the New Castle County Council seats up were won by Democrats. All candidates, with the exception of John Cartier in district eight, ran unopposed. The Republican party did not flip any seats and Democrats maintained their supermajority. Democrat Monique Johns was elected President of the New Castle County Council.

New Castle County Council
Party	Before	After	Change
Democratic	11	11	Steady
Republican	1	1	Steady
Total	12	12	

=== Sussex County Council ===
Of the three Sussex County Council seats up, two of them were won by Republicans, both of them ran unopposed. Democrat Jane Gruenebaum flipped Council District three, ousting incumbent Mark G. Schaeffer. Gruenebaum's victory made her the sole Democrat on the council, reducing the Republican majority from five seats to four.

Sussex County Council
Sussex County Council
Party	Before	After	Change
Democratic	0	1	▲1
Republican	5	4	▼1
Total	5	5	

=== Wilmington mayor ===
Incumbent Democratic Mayor Mike Purzycki had considered running for reelection. However, on October 3, 2023, Purzycki revealed that he would not be seeking a third term citing his age and a desire to spend time with his family. Incumbent Governor of Delaware John Carney, who was unable to seek reelection due to term limits, decided to enter the race. Due to the Delaware Democratic Party's dominance over both the state and Wilmington, the Republican State Committee of Delaware did not run a candidate. Since no other candidates ran in the general election, Carney won the election unopposed.

Wilmington mayoral election, 2024
Party	Candidate	Votes	%
Democratic	John Carney	24,191	100.00%
Total votes		24,191	100.00%
