= United People's Movement (Cayman Islands) =

Political party in the Cayman Islands

- Abbreviation: UPM
- Leader: Julianna O'Connor-Connolly
- Founder: Julianna O'Connor-Connolly
- Founded: November 2023
- Dissolved: April 2025
- Merged into: PPM
- Ideology: Conservatism
- Political position: Centre-right
- Colours: Orange

The United People's Movement (UPM) was a political party of the Cayman Islands that held government between November 2023 and April 2025.

== History ==
The party was founded in November 2023 after Wayne Panton left as Premier of the Cayman Islands. The party was formed by Julianna O'Connor-Connolly who became the new premier. In April 2024, the party revealed its policy priority document for 2026. Later that year, four leading members of the party resigned, including Deputy Premier Andre Ebanks. In February and March 2025, three members of the minority UPM government, including Premier O'Connor-Connolly, joined the PPM. The party dissolved in April 2025.

== See also ==
- List of political parties in the Cayman Islands
