= Cayman Islands National Party =

Political party

- Abbreviation: CINP
- Leader: Dan Scott
- Founder: Dan Scott
- Founded: January 2025; 1 year ago
- Headquarters: Shedden Road, George Town
- Ideology: Populism; Anti-immigration
- Political position: Centre-right to Right-wing
- Colours: Purple
- Parliament of the Cayman Islands: 4 / 19

Website
- nationalparty.ky

The Cayman Islands National Party, shortened to the National Party, is a political party in the Cayman Islands.

== History ==
The Cayman Islands National Party was established in January 2025, three months prior to the 2025 Caymanian general election. The CINP was led by Dan Scott, a former chair of the Education Council and a former manager at Ernst & Young. Scott stated his decision to name the CINP as such as to demonstrate the party's commitment to representing the best interests of the people and of the islands.

During the 2025 election, Scott was unsuccessful in his bid for the riding of Cayman Brac East but vowed to stay on as leader of the party. The parliamentary leader became Gary ‘Peanut’ Rutty, who won George Town South. Rutty became deputy premier in a government consisting of the CINP alongside the Caymanian Community Party and three independents.

== Ideology ==
Leader Dan Scott described the party's belief as the preservation of “Caymanian values, traditions, heritage and our environment”. The party fielded a group of candidates without previous electoral experience, with a slate that consisted of former business owners and corporate employees. Scott had highlighted their prior lack of political experience as an asset. Scott was critical of incumbent politicians as having sold out people behind closed doors, destroyed trust in government, spent public money, raising the cost of living, and having created an immigration crisis.

Dan Scott highlighted access to better-paying jobs, border security, government accountability and efficiency, and immigration reform as key policy goals for the CINP, and had prioritized “transparent, accountable, community-focused leadership” as part of their commitments. The party supports raising the minimum wage and abolishing mandatory retirement for Caymanians. Scott stated he supported the extension of the East-West Arterial.

== Election results ==
| Election | Leader | Votes | % | Seats | +/– | Position | Status |
|---|---|---|---|---|---|---|---|
| 2025 | Dan Scott | 3,596 | 19.51 | 4 / 19 | New | 3rd | Coalition |
