= Removal of Pen Sovann =

Pen Sovann's removal

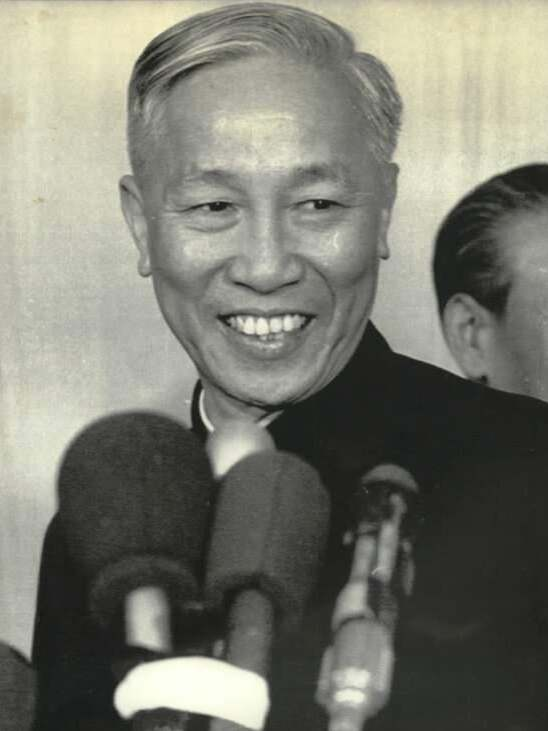
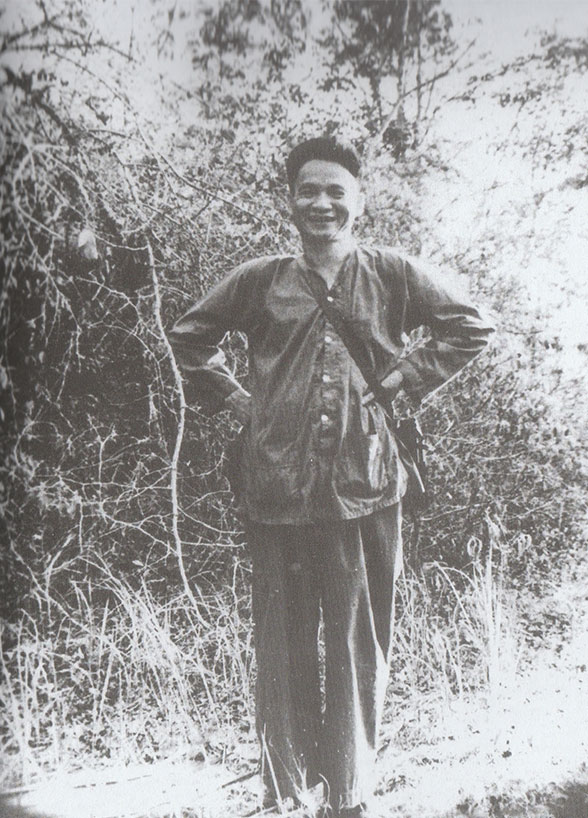
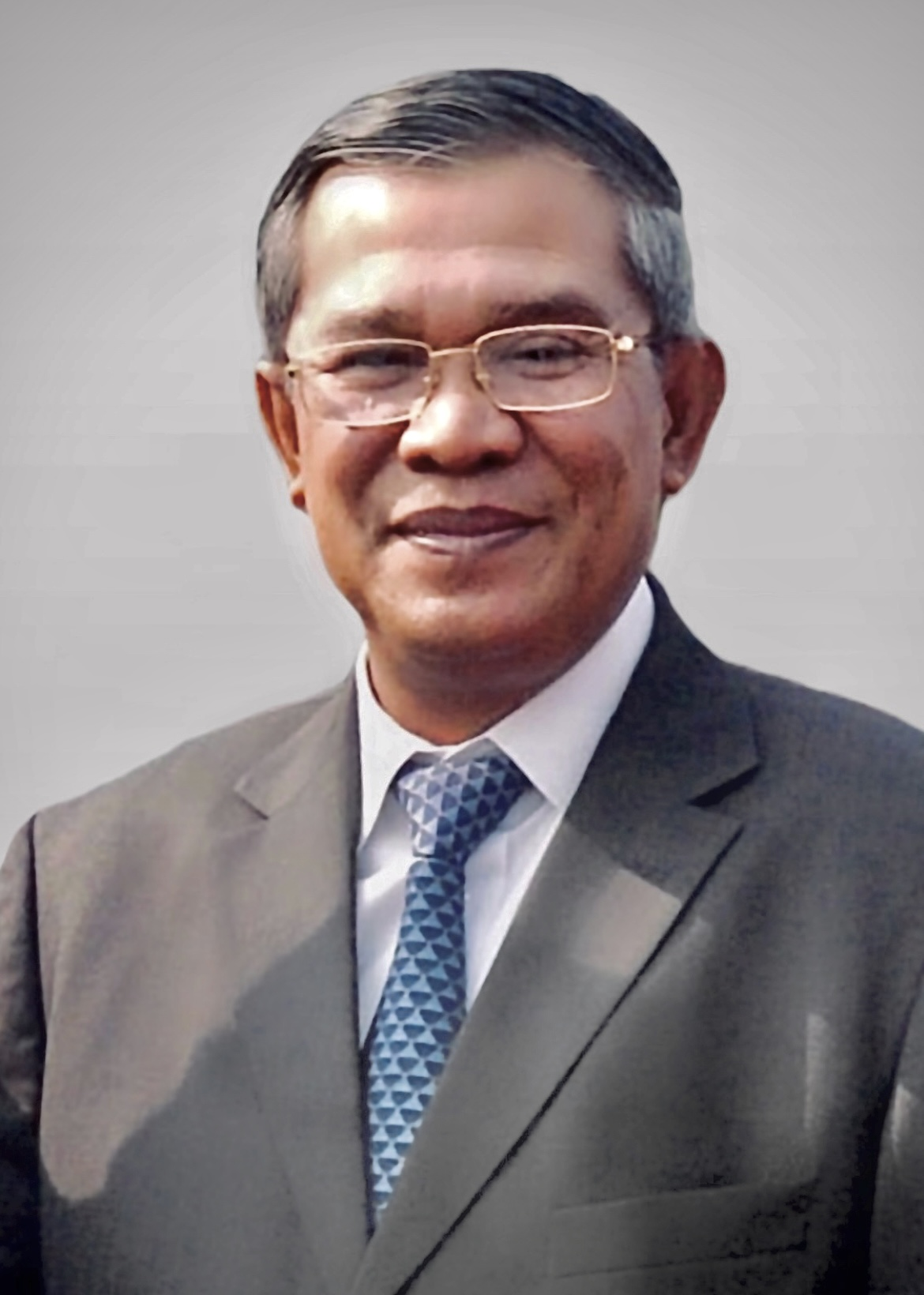
- Lê Đức Thọ Lê Đức Anh Say Phouthang Hun Sen Three images and one burst of the people involved in Pen Sovann's removal
- Date: 2 December 1981; 44 years ago
- Time: 17:45/05:45 p.m (UTC+07:00)
- Location: Pen Sovann's House, People's Republic of Kampuchea
- Cause: Planned creation of an army of five regiments; Wanting the withdrawing of the People's Army of Vietnam; PRK's "overfriendly" relationship with the USSR
- Motive: Vietnamese opposition to the planned internal policies of Pen Sovann
- Perpetrators: A-21 Police Unit; Socialist Republic of Vietnam; People's Army of Vietnam
- Organized by: Say Phouthang; Hun Sen (disputed); Lê Đức Thọ; Lê Đức Anh
- Participants: Policemen of the A-21 Police Unit; Circa. 900 soldiers of the PAVN
- Outcome: Say Phouthang replaces Pen Sovann as Co-De Facto Leader of Heng Samrin; Chan Sy becomes Acting Prime Minister; Heng Samrin becomes General Secretary of the Kampuchean People's Revolutionary Party; Pen Sovann is imprisoned between 1981 and 1988 and under house arrest between 1988 and 1992
- Arrests: Pen Sovann

On 2 December 1981, the Co-De Facto Leader, Prime Minister and General Secretary of the KPRP Pen Sovann was removed from his office or title as co-de facto leader and, three days later, from his prime minister and general secretary positions.

== Background ==
From the beginning of the People's Republic of Kampuchea, Pen Sovann was the co-de facto leader with Heng Samrin. Pen Sovann, who was in the beginning pro-Vietnam became more critical of the Vietnamese occupation of Kampuchean and started a campaign against the occupation. Pen Sovann tried to resist the influence of Vietnam, he made it clear that he wanted the People's Army of Vietnam out of Kampuchea and he planned the creation of a army of five regiments, the Vietnamese leadership opposed it and Lê Đức Thọ went to the Soviet Union, where he complained about Pen Sovann. Further the Vietnamese were against the "overfriendly" relations of Pen Sovann and other politicians with the USSR, Vietnam, didn't wanted a decline in the "special relationship" to Kampuchea with is also important for the security of Vietnam. Another factor of the removal of Sovann, was the tensions between Sovann and Lê Đức Thọ, that rose after Lê Đức Thọ interfered in the internal policies of Cambodia, while it was agreed that he wouldn't intervene, that Sovann's military authority was ignored by Lê Đức Anh, also wasn't in the likeing of Pen Sovann.

Besides Vietnam's opposition to Pen Sovann, even internal in the Kampuchean People's Revolutionary Party, members like Say Phouthang and Hun Sen opposed him.

== Removal ==
On the recommendation of both Lê Đức Thọ and Lê Đức Anh, the Politburo in Hanoi accepted an ‘appeal’ from several members of the Kampuchean People's Revolutionary Party to remove Pen Sovann from his offices he held. At 17:45 (05:45 p.m) on 2 December 1981, Say Phouthang and Hun Sen led the A-21 Police Unit and circa. 900 soldiers of the People's Army of Vietnam, they surrounded the house of Pen Sovann with twelve tanks and arrested him.

== Aftermath ==
With Pen Sovann, imprisoned Say Phouthang was seen as the new co-de facto leader. Even while arrested Pen Sovann still hold the offices of prime minister and general secretary of the KPRP until 5 December 1981. On 5 December, co-l'de facto leader Heng Samrin became the new general secretary of the KPRP, while Chan Sy became acting prime minister on the same day. As the reason for the new officeholders, the government announced that Sovann's health had declined. Later the government said that Pen Sovann lived in Hanoi, after a drug overdose.

During this time, Sovann was imprisoned in the Hà Ðông prison near Hanoi; he remained there until 1988. Afterwards, he was kept under house arrest until 1992, when he was allowed to return to Cambodia.

In July 2002, Pen Sovann gave an interview in which he also discussed his arrest. Pen Sovann named three reasons wjy why he was arrested, which were, as he said, free markets, discrimination and nationalism against Vietnamese who lived in Cambodia and that he didn't respect the orders given by Vietnam. He said that the first accusation came from Lê Đức Thọ and that Phan Dinh Vinh said to him that he would remain in prison until his death. Further, Sovann claimed that Hun Sen was pressured by Vietnam to appoint him as Deputy Prime Minister; he also said that Ngo Dean was the advisor of Hun Sen. Sovann was also the one who claimed that Hun Sen was involved in his removal; this is, however, disputed.

== See also ==
- 1970 Cambodian coup d'état
- Bangkok Plot
- 1997 Cambodian coup d'état
- 2000 Cambodian coup d'état attempt
