= Vice President of the State Council of Cambodia =

The Vice President of the State Council of Cambodia (Khmer: អនុប្រធានក្រុមប្រឹក្សារដ្ឋនៃកម្ពុជា) was the deputy head of state of People's Republic of Kampuchea and State of Cambodia from 1979 to 1993.

== List of vice presidents ==
Name	Period	President
Pen Sovan	January 1979 – 1979	Heng Samrin
Say Phouthang	1979 – April 1992	Heng Samrin

== See also ==
- Deputy Presidents of the State Presidium of Kampuchea
