= List of de facto leaders of the People's Republic of Kampuchea =

List of the de facto leaders of the Cambodian State (1979–1992)

De facto leader of the Kampuchean People's Revolutionary Council Government De facto leader of the People's Republic of Kampuchea De facto leader of the State of Cambodia
- Emblems of the PRK/SOC

- Flags of the PRK/SOC

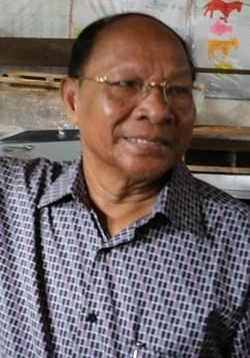
- Longest serving Heng Samrin; 8 January 1979 – 1985 (Note: One sources mentions that Heng Samrin was the de facto leader until 1992.)
- Type: De facto leader
- Status: Informal term for the most important political figure of the People's Republic of Kampuchea
- Reports to: De facto: Lê Đức Thọ (1979–1982) (as Chief Advisor of the People's Republic of Kampuchea) (Note: Lê Đức Thọ also was the Chief Adviser to the Kampuchean United Front for National Salvation.) and Lê Đức Anh (1979–1986) (as Commander for the Vietnamese Forces in Cambodia) (Note: While it was agreed that the Chief Advisor, which was Lê Đức Thọ doesn't intervene in the internal affairs, the Chief Advisor interfered into the internal affairs. Pen Sovann later said in an interview that Chief Advisor Lê Đức Thọ, controlled the government. Government officials who opposed the Vietnamese occupation were purged and removed from their positions. While Lê Đức Anh, had a lower rank than Pen Sovann, Lê Đức Anh ignored the military authority of him. The government of Kampuchea needed to consult with the supervisor of Vietnam on major decisions. Naranhkiri Tith argued that Vietnamese were the policy makers and that the Cambodian government officials were more like puppets. Also Thomas Clayton argues that the Vietnamese advisors "pulled the strings" over Kampuchea. Bernd Schaefer wrote in his book "Relationship in the Shadow of Vietnam: the GDR and Cambodia/ Kampuchea 1969–1989" that Kampuchea was governed almost similar to a colony, by Vietnam and that Kampuchea was seen like Laos to be a member, of a de facto “Indochinese Federation” ruled by Vietnam. He also explains that GDR Observers noticed that Vietnamese advisors controlled the country.)
- Seat: Phnom Penh
- Precursor: Supreme Leader of Democratic Kampuchea
- Formation: 8 January 1979
- First holder: Pen Sovann and Heng Samrin
- Final holder: Chea Sim
- Abolished: 28 February 1992 or 15 March 1992
- Succession: De facto leader of Cambodia (February/March 1992–Circa. June 1992); Only officeholder: Chea Sim

During the whole existence of the People's Republic of Kampuchea (later State of Cambodia), the state had a de facto leader who would not always necessarily be head of state or head of government or even the General Secretary of the Kampuchean People's Revolutionary Party.

== List ==
No.	Portrait	Name (Birth–Death)	Term of office			Party	References
No.	Portrait	Name (Birth–Death)	Took office	Left office	Time in office	Party	References
1		Pen Sovann ប៉ែន សុវណ្ណ (1936–2016) (Note: As General Secretary of the Kampuchean People's Revolutionary Party.) and Heng Samrin ហេង សំរិន (born 1934)	8 January 1979	2 December 1981	2 years, 328 days	KPRP	
2		Heng Samrin ហេង សំរិន (born 1934) (Note: As General Secretary of the Kampuchean People's Revolutionary Party.) and Say Phouthang សាយ ភូថង (1920–2016)	2 December 1981	1985	c. 3 years, 43 days	KPRP	
3		Hun Sen ហ៊ុន សែន (born 1952)	1985	1990	c. 5 years, 237 days	KPRP	
4		Chea Sim ជា ស៊ីម (1932–2015)	1990	28 February 1992 or 15 March 1992	c. 1 year, 189 days	KPRP CPP	

== See also ==
- Supreme Leader of Democratic Kampuchea
- List of prime ministers of Cambodia
- List of heads of state of Cambodia
- List of leaders of the Soviet Union
- Supreme Leader (North Korean title)
- Paramount leader
- List of de facto leaders of the Mongolian People's Republic
- Chairman of the State Administration Council
- Chief of the High Command
