= Kampuchean Federation of Trade Unions =

- Founded: 1979
- Dissolved: 1999
- Headquarters: Phnom Penh
- Location: Cambodia
- Members: 62,000 (1983)
- Key people: Men Sam An, chairwoman
- Affiliations: World Federation of Trade Unions

The Kampuchean Federation of Trade Unions (abbreviated KAFTU) was a trade union centre in the People's Republic of Kampuchea (present-day Cambodia). In the official PRK discourse, KAFTU was referred to as "the training school of the working class for economic and administrative management". KAFTU was affiliated to the World Federation of Trade Unions.

The organization was founded in 1979. It was one of the major mass organizations during the PRK period, and it was a key constituent of the Kampuchean United Front for National Construction and Defence. During the PRK period, workers paid one percent of their income to the trade union movement.

The organization opened its first congress on December 7, 1983. 302 delegates and 160 observers participated in the event. As of December 1983, KAFTU claimed a membership of around 62,000. The membership was mainly based amongst civil servants. KAFTU also organized workers in the rubber plantations and industries, such as weaving factories, flour factories, liquor factories, bar soap enterprises and glass factories. As of 1989, Men Sam An served as chairwoman of KAFTU and Lay Samon as vice chairman.

As of 1993, KAFTU has become dormant. The last congress of the organization had been held in 1989. It was still the sole trade union organization in the country, however. In a later response to the struggles of garment industries' workers in the new capitalist economy, the organization began to reorganize itself (as the 'Cambodian Federation of Trade Unions'). It began to distribute membership cards again, particularly amongst garment, winery, port and transport workers. As of the mid-1990s, Men Sam An (the highest-ranking woman within the ruling Cambodian People's Party at the time, later the Deputy Prime Minister of the country) was still the head of the organization. In 1999 the organization was substituted by the Cambodian Federation of Independent Trade Unions.
