= KRWA (disambiguation) =

KRWA may refer to:

- Kampuchean Revolutionary Women's Association of the PRK/SOC (1978–1993)
- KRWA radio station broadcasting from Rye, Colorado
- Kansas Rural Water Association
- Kentucky Rural Water Association
- Kings River Water Association
- Kavalloor Residents Welfare Association (India)
