= Pen Sovann =

28th Prime Minister of Cambodia

Father of January 7 Pen Sovann
- ប៉ែន សុវណ្ណ

Leader of the People's Republic of Kampuchea
- De facto 8 January 1979 – 2 December 1981 Serving with Heng Samrin
- President: Heng Samrin and Say Phouthang
- Prime Minister: Himself
- Vice President: Say Phouthang and Himself
- Preceded by: Pol Pot (as Supreme Leader of Democratic Kampuchea)
- Succeeded by: Say Phouthang

Prime Minister of the People's Republic of Cambodia
- In office 27 June 1981 – 5 December 1981
- President: Heng Samrin
- Leader: Heng Samrin and Himself
- Preceded by: Pol Pot (1979)
- Succeeded by: Chan Sy (acting)

Vice President of the People's Revolutionary Council
- In office January 1979 – 1981 Serving with Say Phouthang
- Preceded by: So Phim and Nhim Ros (as Vice Presidents of the State Presidium)
- Succeeded by: Say Phouthang

Minister of Defense
- In office 10 January 1979 – 5 December 1981
- Prime Minister: Himself
- Preceded by: Son Sen
- Succeeded by: Bou Thang

General Secretary of the Kampuchean People's Revolutionary Party
- In office 5 January 1979 – 5 December 1981
- Preceded by: Tou Samouth (1951)
- Succeeded by: Heng Samrin

Member of Parliament for Kampong Speu
- In office 5 August 2014 – 29 October 2016
- Preceded by: Say Chhum
- Succeeded by: Suon Rida

Personal details
- Born: 15 April 1936 Tram Kak District, Takéo Province, Cambodia, French Indochina
- Died: 29 October 2016 (aged 80) Doun Kaev, Takéo Province, Cambodia
- Party: Cambodia National Rescue Party (2013–2016); Human Rights Party (2007–2013); Cambodian National Sustaining Party (1997–2007); Kampuchean People's Revolutionary Party (1978–1981); Communist Party of Kampuchea (1958–1974)

Military service
- Allegiance: Cambodia; People's Republic of Kampuchea
- Branch/service: Khmer Issarak; Kampuchean United Front for National Salvation; FUNSK
- Years of service: 1949–1981
- Battles/wars: First Indochina War; Cambodian Civil War; Cambodian–Vietnamese War

Pen Sovann (Khmer: ប៉ែន សុវណ្ណ; 15 April 1936 – 29 October 2016) was a Cambodian politician and revolutionary who served as the Prime Minister of the Hanoi-backed People's Republic of Cambodia from 27 June 1981 to 5 December 1981. He also served as General Secretary of the Kampuchean People's Revolutionary Party (CPRP) from 1979 to 1981. He was arrested and removed from office in December 1981 by the Vietnamese for irritating Lê Đức Thọ, the chief adviser to the PRK government. He was imprisoned in Vietnam until January 1992.

Sovann founded the Cambodian National Sustaining Party, which contested the 1998 election but did not win a seat in parliament. He later joined the Human Rights Party founded in 2007 and served as its vice president. In 2012, he became a member of the newly founded Cambodia National Rescue Party (CNRP) and stood as an MP candidate for Kampong Speu. He was elected and was sworn in on 5 August 2014, serving until his death in October 2016.

== Biography ==
Pen Sovann was born in Chan Teab Village, Samraong Commune, Tram Kak District, Takéo province. He first joined the Khmer Issarak at the age of 13 in 1950 and fought against the French. Two years later, Sovann joined the Indochinese Communist Party where he first met Ta Mok. Sovann supported the Khmer Rouge during the 1970-1973 civil war against the Khmer Republic and he worked along with Chan Sy under Khieu Thirith, in charge of the Voice of the National United Front of Kampuchea. From 1973 to 1979, Sovann lived in exile in Hanoi.

Sovann was a founding leader of Kampuchean United Front for National Salvation (KUFNS or FUNSK) on 25 November 1978. He served as Secretary-General of the Kampuchean People's Revolutionary Party from 5 January 1979 to 1 December 1981, when he was replaced by Heng Samrin following his removal from office by the Vietnamese.

Sovann was arrested on 2 December 1981 for irritating Lê Đức Thọ, chief Vietnamese advisor to the Kampuchean United Front for National Salvation (FUNSK) and the People's Republic of Kampuchea (PRK). He was released from Vietnam's prison on 25 January 1992, after he served over 10 years. Sovann explained his long ordeal in prison: "When I wanted to create our own army of five regiments, the Vietnamese didn't agree and Lê Đức Thọ went to the USSR to complain." In an interview later he said he disbelieved in Marxism from 1981 on.

After being released, Sovann returned to Kampong Speu province where he spent years living as a farmer with his family, before re-entering politics and forming the Cambodian National Sustaining Party (CNSP) in 1997. The CNSP ran and lost in the 1998 general election. In 2007, he served as vice-president of Kem Sokha's Human Rights Party (HRP) but lost during the 2008 election. Subsequently, the HRP merged with the Sam Rainsy Party to form the Cambodian National Rescue Party in 2012. In 2013, Sovann became the CNRP's candicate for member of parliament for Kampong Speu province. He was elected and was sworn in on 5 August 2014.

Sovann died in Doun Kaev, Takéo Province on 29 October 2016. He was cremated in Phnom Penh on 6 November 2016. On 10 November, Suon Rida was appointed to fill Sovann's vacant CNRP seat in Kampong Speu.

== Political positions ==
Pen Sovann advocated for Marxism and nationalism before his imprisonment, before turning away from Marxism in 1981. Pen also criticized the Cambodian People's Party to have established a dictatorship like the one of the Khmer Rouge.

== See also ==
- Communist Party of Kampuchea

== Bibliography ==
- Luke Young: Cambodian Political History. The Case of Pen Sovann In: Monthly Review 65.1 (November 2013).
- Scalapino, Robert A.; Wanadi, Jusuf; Economic, political, and security issues in Southeast Asia in the 1980s, Institute of East Asian Studies, University of California, 1982, ISBN 0912966521

Political offices
Preceded by Pol Pot	Prime Minister of Cambodia; 1981	Succeeded by Chan Sy
Party political offices
Preceded by None	First Secretary of the Kampuchean People's Revolutionary Party; 1979–1981	Succeeded by Himself; General Secretary
Preceded by Himself; First Secretary	General Secretary of the Kampuchean People's Revolutionary Party; 1981	Succeeded by Heng Samrin
