= Say Phouthang =

Cambodian politician

- សាយ ភូថង
- Bust of Say Phouthang in Koh Kong Province

Leader of the People's Republic of Kampuchea
- De facto 2 December 1981 – 1985 Serving with Heng Samrin
- President: Heng Samrin
- Prime Minister: Chan Sy; Hun Sen (acting)
- Vice President: Himself
- Preceded by: Pen Sovann
- Succeeded by: Hun Sen

President of the Central Commission of the People's Republic of Kampuchea
- In office Unknown – October 1985
- Preceded by: Unknown
- Succeeded by: Unknown

Vice President of the State Council
- In office c. 8 January 1979 – April 1992 Serving with Pen Sovann (1979–Unknown)
- President: Heng Samrin
- Prime Minister: Vacant; Pen Sovann; Chan Sy; Hun Sen
- Preceded by: Office established
- Succeeded by: Unknown

Personal details
- Born: 17 July 1920 Koh Kong Province, Cambodia, French Indochina
- Died: 13 June 2016 (aged 95) Bangkok, Kingdom of Thailand
- Party: Cambodian People's Party
- Spouse: Kho Phouthang
- Relatives: Mithuna Phuthong (granddaughter)

Military service
- Allegiance: Cambodia
- Branch/service: Royal Cambodian Army

Say Phouthang (Thai: ใส่ ภู่ทอง; RTGS: Sai Phuthong; 17 July 1920 – 13 June 2016) was a Cambodian politician and a leader during the People's Republic of Kampuchea.

== Background ==
Koh Kong in Cambodia and Trat in Thailand were ceded to French protectorate of Cambodia in 1904. Three years later, Trat was returned to Siam, in exchange for the Siamese province of Inner Cambodia, while Koh Kong remained part of French Cambodia.

During World War II, as France was put in a difficult situation by the German invasion, the Thai army attempted to recover their lost territories in 1940. In what was to be one of the last colonial battles of the French Empire, the French navy pushed back the Thai attack ensuring the border of Cambodia, but leaving Thai Koh Kong population estranged. Koh Kong had been under Thai influence since at least the 17th century. After the Independence of Cambodia, Koh Kong was established as a Cambodian province in 1959.

The remaining population on the border between Trat and Koh Kong is referred to as Thai Koh Kong.

== Biography ==
=== A child of Thailand on the last colonial battle of the French Empire ===
Say Phuthong was born in Ban Nabad, Koh Kong Province, on July 17, 1920 from a Cambodian family of Thai descent or "Thai Koh Kong". After the 1904 Franco-Siamese treaty, his family immigrated to live in Khlong Yai on the Thai side of the border.

In the wake of the Franco-Thai War of 1940, Say Phuthong formed a local Khmer Issarak group around Koh Kong with the aim of "liberat[ing] Cambodia from France". In 1954, when Cambodia gained independence, he gathered national fighters into an independent Khmer group and traveled to Vietnam to study Marxism–Leninism and military science.

In 1965, in an effort to crack down on communist guerillas, Prime Minister Norodom Sihanouk announced that Communist documents were found in Koh Kong and some were in Thai language, directly pointing his finger to the Thai Kho Kong and their leader, Say Phouthang.

In 1970, "Uncle Sai" came back from Hanoi and proceeded to establish "Thai Koh Kong partisans" to repel the American influence in Cambodia. He aligned with the Khmer Rouge along with the Sihanouk group to overthrow the Lon Nol government. Say Phouthang led a grassroots resistance force based in Areng area, Thmor Bang district, Koh Kong province. In 1973, as the vice-president of the Kampuchean United Front for National Salvation or FUNSK on the Western front, he led an armed insurrection against the republican government.

=== The first resistant against Pol Pot ===
From being a group with link of Khmer Rouge fighters, Say Puthang changed to the opposite side after the fall of Phnom Penh. Finding refuge in Thai territory, he went into hiding in the Cardamon mountains near the Thai border building strongholds and organizing troops. Say Phouthang "was among the first to rebel against Pol Pot".

As they crossed the border to flee from the Khmer Rouge, "Uncle Sai" and the Thai Koh Kong party got to know Thai Generals Chavalit Yongchaiyudh and Wichit Yathip, who secretly helped their resistance movement.

Phouthang kept a tenacious but tiny army of only 3 small battalions against the Khmer Rouge who faced them with 27 battalions.

=== The leader from two lands who chose Hun Sen to lead since 1985 ===
Thai Koh Kong resolved to secretly send Say to Vietnam as he had fought closely with Vietnam since the Khmer Issarak and the Indochina Communist Party used to live in Vietnam for a while. Meeting with fellow revolutionary Cambodians such as Heng Samrin, they co-established the "Republic of Cambodia" on January 8, 1979, with Heng Samrin serving as head of state and "Uncle Put" as deputy head of state.

In December 1981, Say Phouthang led Vietnamese troops and the A-21 [police unit] with 12 tanks and about 900 troops to arrest Prime Minister Pen Sovan after the latter had disappointed Lê Đức Thọ, the chief adviser to the Hanoi-backed People's Republic of Kampuchea. After this arrest, Say Phouthang was perhaps the most powerful Cambodian leader. Thus, he played a vital role in choosing Hun Sen as prime minister. Hun Sen came into the picture after prime minister Chan Sy died in late 1984. Despite his young age of 33, Say saw Hun Sen has the right man to lead the Khmer nation as Prime Minister, something for which Hun Sen was grateful to the end of his life.

Say Phouthang's health started declining in 1989 and he was hospitalized in Hanoi during that year.

Say Phouthang was the third in 1981, fourth in 1985 or fifth after 1993-highest-ranked member of the Cambodian People's Party's politburo until the end of his political career.

During the elections of May 1993, he was second on the list of candidates for the Cambodia People's Party in Kandal Province, and he won, but he resigned even before the results were published. After the restoration of the monarchy, he was appointed as a member of the Privy Council of King Norodom Sihanouk on December 25, 1993.

At the end of his life, he retired to live at Klong Yai on the Thai side of the border where he had grown up. Going to and from his home to his hospital in Bangkok for regular treatments, he died in the Thai capital city on June 12, 2016.

== Legacy: the nationalist of Koh Kong ==
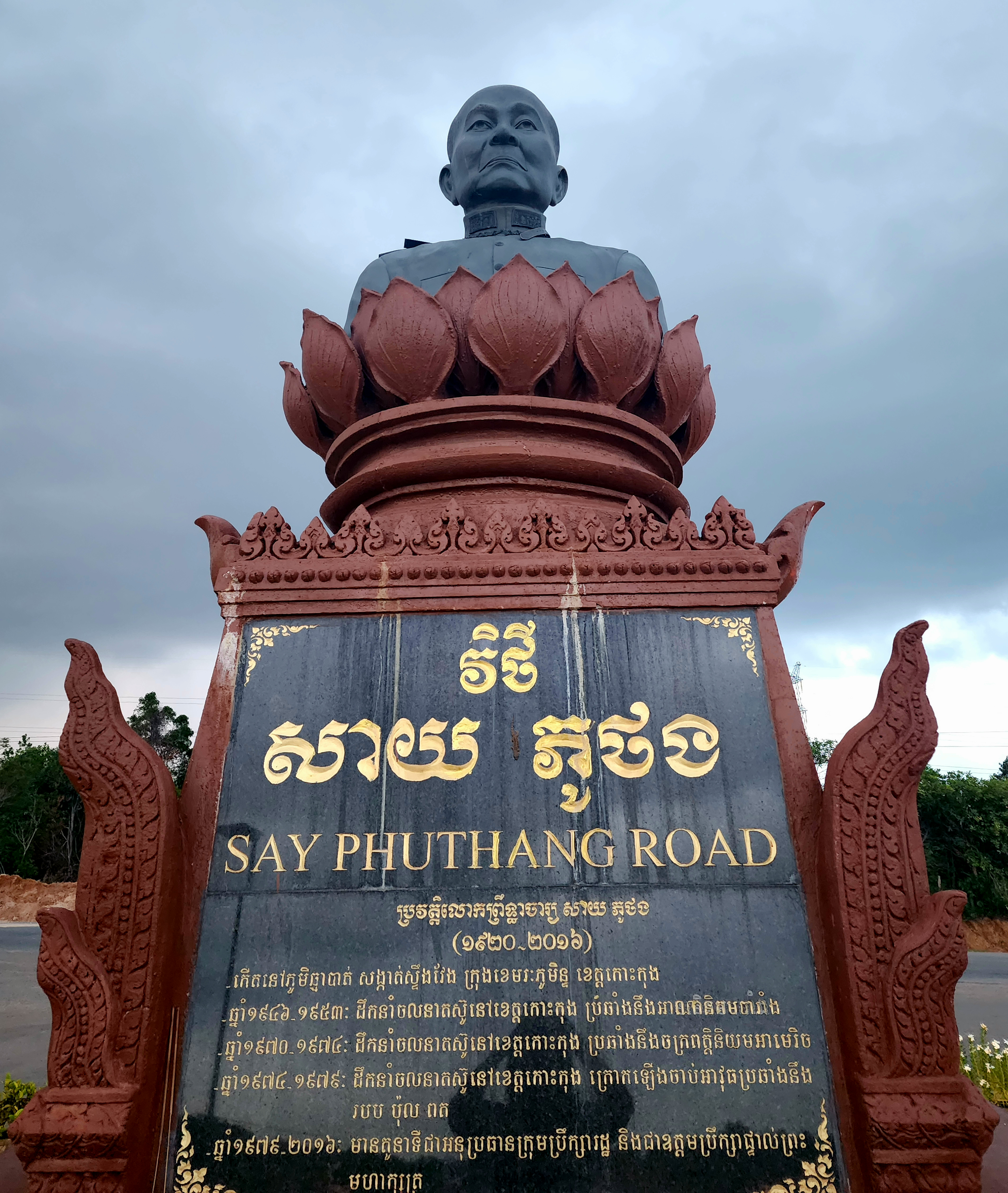
The monument and the road named in honor of Say Phouthang in Koh Kong Province were inaugurated in presence of his old friends Heng Samrin, Tea Banh and Tep Vong.

In the "rather pluralistic composition of the PRK", Say Puthang was one of the only two powerful individuals who were not Khmer and did not go to Vietnam, who split with Pol Pot before 1975 along with Bou Thang, the Minister of Defence and member of a small northeastern ethnic minority. According to Cambodian Prime Minister Hun Sen, Say Phouthang was considered by the Cambodian people as one of the "main heroes who sacrificed everything to liberate the country from the Khmer Rouge regime".

He has given the responsibility of Koh Kong provincial governor to his son Yuth Phouthang, an uncle of Eh Phuthong.

In 2018, on National Road that he helped to build to connect Phnom Penh to Koh Kong, a massive monument was inaugurated in his honor in presence of his old friends Heng Samrin, Tea Banh and Tep Vong.
