= Cambodian National Sustaining Party =

Defunct political party in Cambodia

Cambodian National Sustaining Party គណបក្ស ទ្រទ្រង់ ជាតិកម្ពុជា
- Abbreviation: CNSP
- Leader: Pen Sovan
- Founded: c. 29 August 1997
- Ideology: Khmer nationalism Liberal democracy Monarchism; Liberalism
- Colors: Blue
- Slogan: Independence, Freedom, Peace, Democracy

Party flag

Website
- http://www.pensovann.com (Defunct)

The Cambodian National Sustaining Party was created by its president Pen Sovan. Formed on circa 29 August 1997, it held on 21 January 1998, its first party congress.

== Political ideology ==
This political party's ideology is a combination of several ideas. One of its ideologies that's right-wing is supporting and promoting "Nation Religion and King", "constitutional monarchy" and to "protect the constitution of Cambodia". With the other part of its ideology which is left-wing is again promoting/supporting "women's rights in society" and promote equal rights for women like men in both "political" and "social" roles. Another left-wing idea is promoting peoples interests in the present and future. The other part of its ideology is liberalism since the CNSP believes in "peace", "freedom", opposition to "anarchism", "dictatorship" and prevent "starvation and poverty" in Cambodia, and construct a "free and pluralistic democracy".

== Political activities ==
The CNSP's press secretary explained to a Cambodian newspaper called Phnom Pehn that the CNSP expresses an "appeal" for investigators from the "Human Rights Action Committee" to investigate the deaths of rival candidates like the one called Meas Soy of FUNCINPEC competing against Sam Rainsy and another called Uch Horn who was affected by political violence. This is because the Cambodian National Sustaining Party wanted to protect democracy and safety of political party candidates for a free and fair 2002 February election.

== CNSP gallery ==
CNSP meeting
