= Chan Sy =

29th Prime Minister of Cambodia

- ចាន់ ស៊ី

Prime Minister of the People's Republic of Kampuchea
- In office 11 February 1982 – 26 December 1984; Acting: 5 December 1981 – 11 February 1982
- President: Heng Samrin
- Vice President: Say Phouthang
- Leader: Heng Samrin and Say Phouthang
- Preceded by: Pen Sovan
- Succeeded by: Hun Sen (acting)

Personal details
- Born: 1932 Kampong Chhnang Province, Cambodia, French Indochina
- Died: 26 December 1984 (aged 52) Moscow, Russian SFSR, Soviet Union
- Party: Kampuchean People's Revolutionary Party

Military service
- Allegiance: Kingdom of Cambodia; People's Republic of Kampuchea
- Branch/service: Royal Khmer Armed Forces; Kampuchean United Front for National Salvation
- Years of service: 1950–1984
- Battles/wars: Cambodian–Vietnamese War

Chan Sy, also spelt Chan Si, (Khmer: ចាន់ ស៊ី; 1932 – 26 December 1984) was a Cambodian politician who served as the Prime Minister of the People's Republic of Kampuchea from 1982 until his death in 1984.

== Biography ==
Chan Sy was a Cambodian of Chinese descent who early in his life became a military figure by joining the Khmer Viet Minh forces in 1950s.

Chan Sy left Cambodia in 1954 after the Geneva Conference that recognized Prince Norodom Sihanouk's government as the sole legitimate authority in independent Cambodia. A member of the Communist Party from 1960, Chan Sy was believed to have returned to Cambodia in 1970 after the coup that ousted Prince Sihanouk and placed the pro-U.S. Lon Nol in power. Chan Sy, who was opposed to ultra-nationalist Pol Pot, by whose partisans he was detained in 1973. He reappeared on the scene in 1978, with the forces of the Kampuchean United Front for National Salvation (KUFNS) and with the Vietnamese that toppled the Khmer Rouge regime in 1979.

After some months of military training in the Soviet Union, in 1980 he was appointed deputy defense minister and following year defense minister and vice-president of the Council of Ministers; the same year he also became a member of the Politburo of the Kampuchean People's Revolutionary Party (KPRP).

When Pen Sovan was replaced as party general secretary by Heng Samrin, Chan Sy took over the premiership. Considered a steadfast adherent to Vietnam's Kampuchean policy, Chan Sy had made visits to Bulgaria, East Germany as well as to the Soviet Union. In the National Assembly he represented his native province.

Chan Sy spent many years in Vietnam and was a founding member of the Kampuchean United Front for National Salvation (FUNSK) that overthrew Pol Pot's regime. After the establishment of the People's Republic of Kampuchea, he became chief political commissar of the armed forces, and eventually appointed by the National Assembly as Prime Minister on February 9, 1982.

Chan Sy died in a Moscow hospital, where he was being treated for a cardiac ailment, in December 1984. His death was reported by the Vietnamese information agency on December 31, 1984, although he was believed to have died some days earlier. Chan Sy was a good friend of Pen Sovan, who fell into disgrace earlier for irritating the Vietnamese. The circumstances of his death were mysterious.

== See also ==
- Hun Sen
- Khmer Rouge
- List of heads of state and government who died in office
- Pol Pot
- Prime Minister of Cambodia

Political offices
Preceded by Pen Sovan	Prime Minister of Cambodia; 1982–1984	Succeeded by Hun Sen
