= Heng Samrin =

Cambodian politician (born 1934)

Samdech Akka Moha Ponhea Chakrei Heng Samrin
- ហេង សំរិន
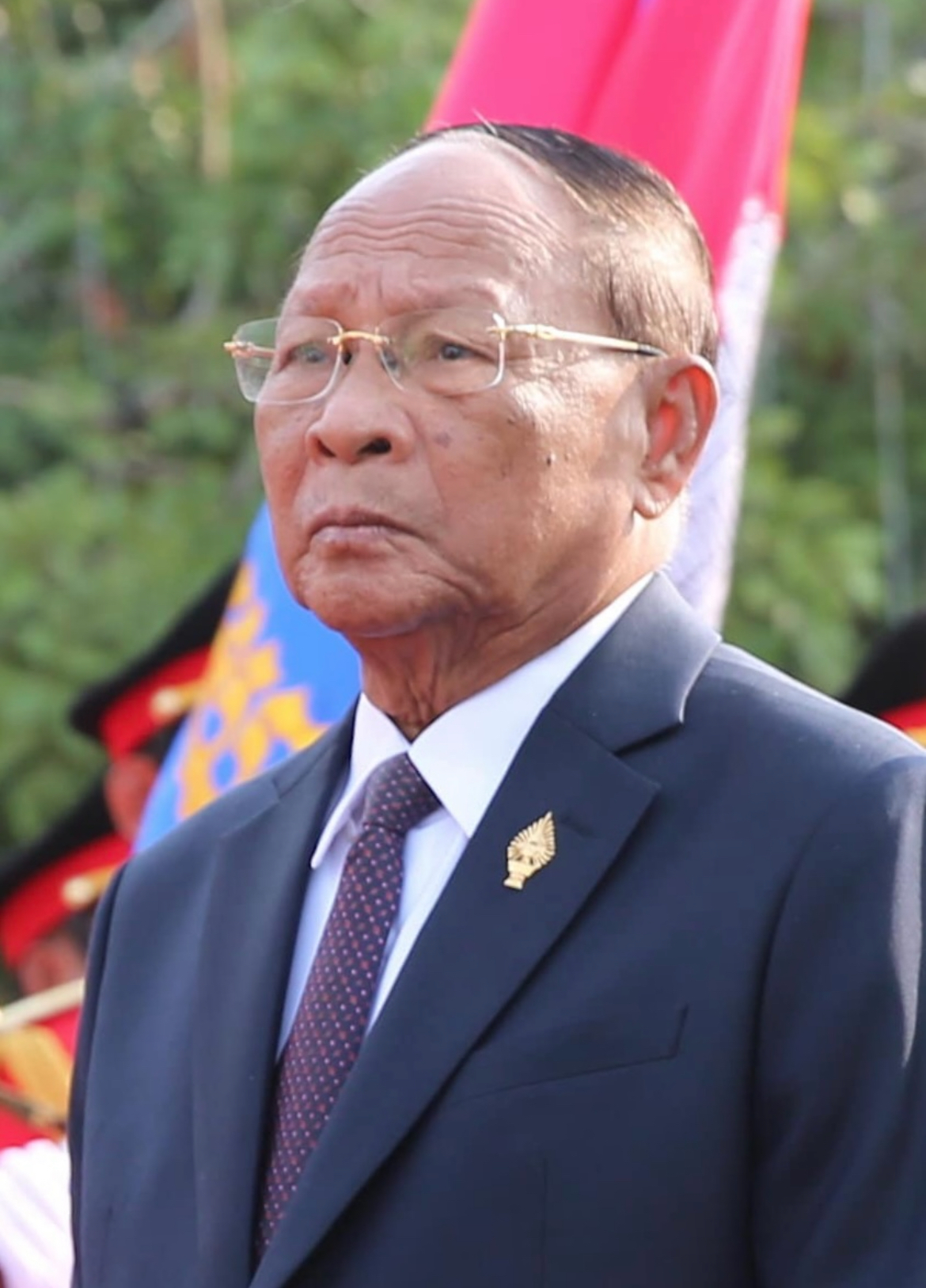
- Samrin in 2019

President of the National Assembly
- In office 21 March 2006 – 22 August 2023
- Monarch: Norodom Sihamoni
- Vice President: Cheam Yeab; Khuon Sudary; Nguon Nhel; Say Chhum; Kem Sokha; You Hockry
- Preceded by: Norodom Ranariddh
- Succeeded by: Khuon Sudary

General Secretary of the Kampuchean People's Revolutionary Party
- In office 5 December 1981 – 17 October 1991
- Leader: Chea Sim and Hun Sen (as "real" leadership)
- Preceded by: Pen Sovan
- Succeeded by: Chea Sim (as President)

Leader of the People's Republic of Kampuchea
- De facto 8 January 1979 – 1985 Serving with Pen Sovann (1979–1981) and Say Phouthang (1981–1985)
- Preceded by: Pol Pot (as Supreme Leader of Democratic Kampuchea)
- Succeeded by: Hun Sen

President of the Council of State
- In office 27 June 1981 – 6 April 1992
- Prime Minister: Pen Sovan; Chan Sy; Hun Sen
- Deputy: Say Phouthang
- Preceded by: Himself (as Chairman of the People's Revolutionary Council)
- Succeeded by: Chea Sim

Chairman of the People's Revolutionary Council (Note: Also called President of the People's Revolutionary Council)
- In office 8 January 1979 – 27 June 1981
- Prime Minister: Pen Sovan
- Deputy: Pen Sovann and Say Phouthang
- Preceded by: Khieu Samphan (as Chairman of the State Presidium)
- Succeeded by: Himself (as President of the Council of State)

Member of the National Assembly
- Incumbent
- Assumed office 14 June 1993
- Constituency: Kandal (1993–1998); Kampong Cham (1998–2018); Tbong Khmum (2018–present)

Personal details
- Born: 25 May 1934 (age 92) Ponhea Kraek District, Kampong Cham Province, Cambodia, French Indochina
- Party: Cambodian People's Party
- Other political affiliations: Kampuchean People's Revolutionary Party (1979–1991)
- Spouse: Sao Ty
- Children: 4

Military service
- Allegiance: Cambodia
- Branch/service: Royal Cambodian Army
- Rank: General of the Army

Heng Samrin (Khmer: ហេង សំរិន; born 25 May 1934) is a Cambodian politician who served as the President of the National Assembly of Cambodia (2006–2023). Between 1979 and 1985, he was the de facto leader of the People's Republic of Kampuchea later renamed into the State of Cambodia, he also was the General Secretary of the Kampuchean People's Revolutionary Party (1981–1991). He has been a member of Parliament since 14 June 1993. He is the oldest member of parliament, and the longest-serving president of the National Assembly in history. His honorary title is "Samdech Akka Moha Ponhea Chakrei Heng Samrin" (Khmer: សម្តេចអគ្គមហាពញាចក្រី ហេង សំរិន).

== Life and career ==
Heng Samrin was born in Kampong Cham Province, Cambodia, in 1934. He joined the Khmer Rouge communist movement led by Pol Pot, and became a political commissar and army division commander when the Khmer Rouge, backed by China, took over the government in 1975. In 1978, after a series of violent purges within the Khmer Rouge leadership in which many prominent cadre members whom Pol Pot felt might be rivals were executed, he fled to Vietnam.

In Vietnam, he was one of the founding members of the Kampuchean United Front for National Salvation (FUNSK). Later that year, Heng returned to Cambodia and organized a resistance movement with the backing and support of Vietnam and the Soviet Union.

After a Vietnamese invasion of Cambodia overthrew the regime of Khmer Rouge in 1979, Vietnamese occupation authorities established the People's Republic of Kampuchea, installing Heng and other pro-Vietnamese Communist politicians as leaders of the new government. He became chairman of the People's Revolutionary Council of the PRK in 1979. In 1981, he became chairman of the Council of State and secretary-general of the People's Revolutionary Party. Though at first he was the effective leader of the government, he lost much of his political power when Hun Sen became Prime Minister of Cambodia in 1985.

As Vietnamese influence declined, Samrin gradually lost his posts, including the post of secretary-general in 1991 and chairman of the council of state in 1992. When King Norodom Sihanouk was restored in 1993, Samrin was given the honorary title of Sâmdech, senior advisor of the King, and was made honorary chairman of Hun Sen's Cambodian People's Party. He was vice chairman of the National Assembly of Cambodia (1998–2006). Since 2006, he has acted as Chairman of the Solidarity Front for Development of the Cambodian Motherland.

The Cambodian People's Party recently released a book about Samrin called A Man of the People, dedicated to him as a hero. According to that book, among supporters of the ruling CPP Heng Samrin is a "much loved and respected figure", even though his recent duties are often largely ceremonial. His full title is Samdach Akeak Moha Ponhea Chakrei Heng Samrin, Protean Radhsaphea ney Preah Reacheanachak Kampuchea (Khmer: សម្តេចអគ្គមហាពញាចក្រី ហេង សំរិន ប្រធានរដ្ឋសភា នៃព្រះរាជាណាចក្រកម្ពុជា).

== Political positions ==
Heng Samrin is critical of nationalism specifically economic nationalism, populism and protectionism.

== See also ==
- People's Republic of Kampuchea

== Notes ==
Political offices
Preceded by Khieu Samphan as President of the State Presidium	Chairman of the Revolutionary Council of Kampuchea; 1979–1981	Succeeded by Himself as Chairman of the State Council
Preceded by Himself as Chairman of the Revolutionary Council	Chairman of the State Council of Cambodia; 1981–1992	Succeeded by Chea Sim
Preceded by Norodom Ranariddh	President of the National Assembly of Cambodia; 2006–2023	Succeeded by Khuon Sudary
Party political offices
Preceded by Pen Sovan	General Secretary of the Kampuchean People's Revolutionary Party; 1981–1991	Succeeded by Chea Sim as President of the People's Party
