= Supreme Leader of Democratic Kampuchea =

De facto leader of Democratic Kampuchea

- Emblem of Democratic Kampuchea

- Flag of Democratic Kampuchea

- Longest in role Pol Pot; 17 April 1975 – 27 December 1979
- Type: De facto leader
- Status: Informal term for the most important political figure of Democratic Kampuchea
- Seat: Phnom Penh (1975–1979); Unknown (1979–1981); Phnom Malai (1981); Unknown (1982)
- Precursor: None
- Formation: 17 April 1975; 51 years ago
- First holder: Pol Pot
- Final holder: Khieu Samphan
- Abolished: 22 June 1982; 44 years ago
- Succession: Phnom Penh based: De facto leader of the People's Republic of Kampuchea
- Unofficial names: Leader of the Khmer Rouge's totalitarian regime Dictator of Cambodia
- Deputy: "Number Two"

The Supreme Leader of Democratic Kampuchea was the informal term for the most important political figure in Democratic Kampuchea between 1975 and 1982.

== List ==
No.	Portrait	Name (Birth–Death)	Term of office			Party	Deputy	References
No.	Portrait	Name (Birth–Death)	Took office	Left office	Time in office	Party	Deputy	References
1		Pol Pot ប៉ុល ពត (1925–1998) (Note: In December 1979, Pol Pot said that while he was the top leader of political and military affairs, he allowed Khieu Samphan and Ieng Sary to run the administration.)	17 April 1975	27 December 1979	4 years, 254 days	CPK	Nuon Chea (1975–1979) Unknown (January 1979–December 1979)	
2		Khieu Samphan ខៀវ សំផន (born 1931)	27 December 1979 (Note: Khieu Samphan also became Prime Minister of Democratic Kampuchea.)	22 June 1982	2 years, 177 days	CPK PDK	Unknown (December 1979–June 1982)	

== See also ==
- List of de facto leaders of the People's Republic of Kampuchea
- List of prime ministers of Cambodia
- List of heads of state of Cambodia
- List of leaders of the Soviet Union
- Supreme Leader (North Korean title)
- Paramount leader
- Chairman of the State Administration Council
- Chief of the High Command
- Duce
