= People's Republic of Kampuchea =

Cambodian state from 1979 until 1992

Kampuchean People's Revolutionary Council Government (1979) រដ្ឋាភិបាលនៃក្រុមប្រឹក្សាប្រជាជនបដិវត្តន៍កម្ពុជា (Note: UNGEGN: rodthaphibeal nei kromobroeksaea brachachn bdevotta kampouchea) People's Republic of Kampuchea (1979–1989) សាធារណរដ្ឋប្រជាមានិតកម្ពុជា (Note: UNGEGN: Sathéarânârôdth Brâchéaméanĭt Kâmpŭchéa) State of Cambodia (1989–1992) រដ្ឋកម្ពុជា (Note: UNGEGN: Rôdth Kâmpŭchéa)
- 1979–1992
- Top: Flag; 1979–1989; Bottom: Flag; 1989–1992 Top: Emblem (1979–1981); Middle: Emblem (1981–1989); Bottom: Emblem (1989–1992)
- Motto: ឯករាជ្យ សន្តិភាព សេរីភាព សុភមង្គល; Êkâréachy, Sântĕphéap, Sériphéap, Sŏphômôngkôl "Independence, Peace, Liberty, Happiness"
- Anthem: បទចម្រៀងនៃសាធារណរដ្ឋប្រជាមានិតកម្ពុជា Bât Châmriĕng ney Sathéarânârôdth Brâchéaméanĭt Kâmpŭchéa "Anthem of the People's Republic of Kampuchea" (Note: From 1989 until 1992, the State of Cambodia continued to use the anthem of the PRK without lyrics.)
- Location of the People's Republic of Kampuchea

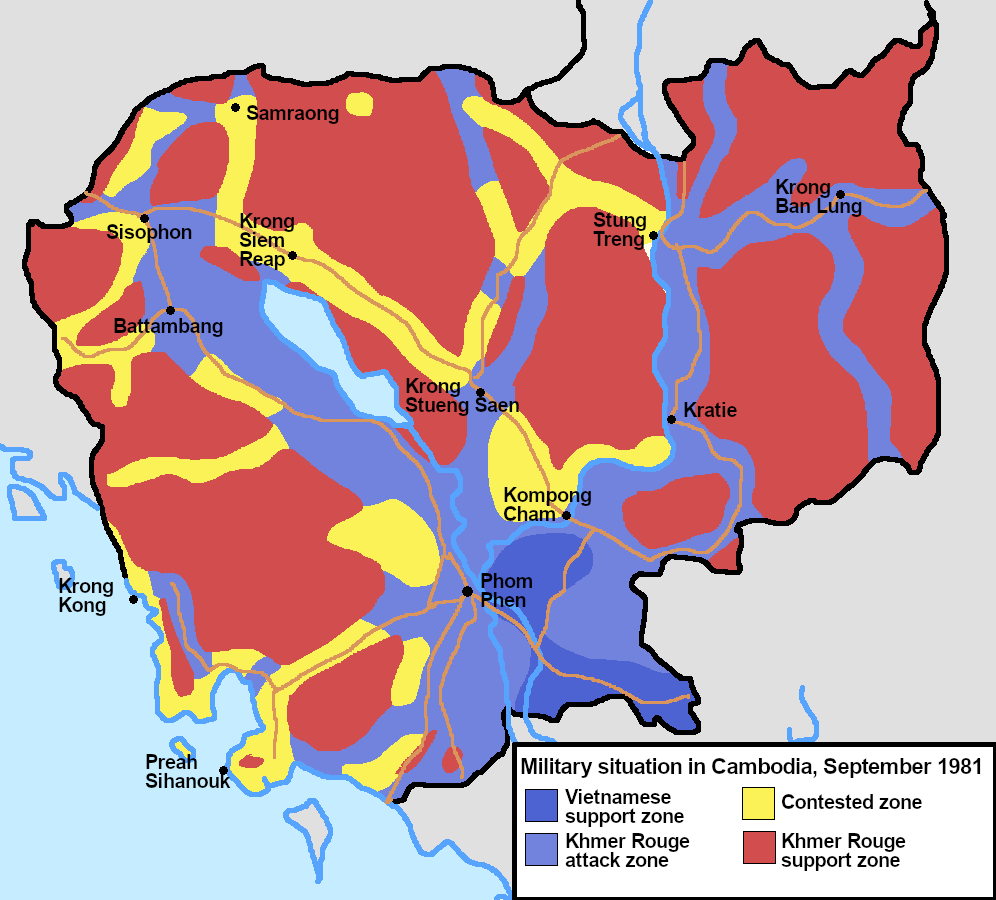
- Situation of the People's Republic of Kampuchea in September 1981 (blue)
- Status: Partially recognised state occupied by the People's Army of Vietnam (1979–1989 or 1991)
- Capital and largest city: Phnom Penh; 11°34′10″N 104°55′16″E
- Official languages: Khmer
- Official script: Khmer
- Other languages: Vietnamese
- Religion: State secularism Buddhism
- Demonyms: Kampuchean, Cambodian, Khmer
- Government: Communist state (until 1991); Parliamentary republic (from 1991)
- De facto leader
  - 1979–1981: Heng Samrin and Pen Sovann
  - 1981–1985: Heng Samrin (Note: As General Secretary of the Kampuchean People's Revolutionary Party) and Say Phouthang
  - 1985–1990: Hun Sen
  - 1990–1992: Chea Sim
- Chairman of the People's Revolutionary Council / President of the State Council
  - 1979–1992: Heng Samrin
- Prime Minister
  - 1979–1981: Vacant
  - 1981: Pen Sovan
  - 1982–1984: Chan Sy
  - 1984–1993: Hun Sen
- Legislature: National Assembly
- Historical era: Cold War
  - Capture of Phnom Penh: 7 January 1979
  - Established as Kampuchean People's Revolutionary Council Government: 8 January 1979
  - Renaming into People's Republic of Kampuchea: 10 or 19 January 1979
  - Constitution: 25 June 1981
  - Removal of Pen Sovann: 2 December 1981
  - Renaming into State of Cambodia: 30 April 1989
  - End of communist rule: 18 October 1991
  - 1991 Paris Peace Agreements: 23 October 1991
  - UNTAC established: 28 February 1992
  - UNTAC becomes operational: 15 March 1992

Area
- 1980: 181.035 km^{2} (69.898 sq mi)

Population
  - 1980: 6,600,000
- Currency: Kampuchean riel (from 1980); Vietnamese đồng (until 1980); No currency (1979)
- Time zone: UTC+07:00 (ICT)
- Calling code: +855
Preceded by	Succeeded by
Democratic Kampuchea; Liberated Area of Cambodia	United Nations–administered Cambodia
- Today part of: Cambodia

The People's Republic of Kampuchea (PRK) (Note: Khmer: សាធារណរដ្ឋប្រជាមានិតកម្ពុជា, UNGEGN: Sathéarônârôdth Brâchéaméanĭt Kâmpŭchéa, ALA-LC: Sādhāraṇaraṭṭh Prajāmānit Kambujā; Vietnamese: Cộng hòa Nhân dân Campuchia) was a partially recognised state in Southeast Asia which existed from 1979 to 1992. It was a satellite state of Vietnam, founded in Cambodia by the Vietnamese-backed Kampuchean United Front for National Salvation, a group of Cambodian communists who were dissatisfied with the Khmer Rouge due to its oppressive rule and defected from it after the overthrow of Democratic Kampuchea, Pol Pot's government. Brought about by an invasion from Vietnam, which routed the Khmer Rouge armies, it had Vietnam and the Soviet Union as its main allies.

The PRK failed to secure United Nations endorsement due to the diplomatic intervention of China, the United Kingdom, the United States and the ASEAN countries. The Cambodian seat at the United Nations was held by the Coalition Government of Democratic Kampuchea, which was the Khmer Rouge in coalition with two non-communist guerrilla factions. However, the PRK was considered the de facto government of Cambodia between 1979 and 1992, albeit with limited international recognition outside of the Soviet Bloc.

Beginning in May 1989, the PRK restored the name "Cambodia" by renaming the country State of Cambodia (SOC) during the last four years of its existence in an attempt to attract international sympathy. However, it retained most of its leadership and one-party structure while undergoing a transition and eventually giving way to the restoration of the Kingdom of Cambodia. The PRK/SOC existed as a communist state from 1979 until 1991, the year in which the ruling single party abandoned its Marxist–Leninist ideology.

Under Vietnamese control, the PRK was established in the wake of the total destruction of the country's institutions, infrastructure and intelligentsia wreaked by Khmer Rouge rule.

== Historical background ==
The PRK was established in January 1979 as a result of a process that began with Khmer Rouge belligerence.

=== Khmer Rouge directs its hostility against Vietnam ===
Initially, communist North Vietnam was a strong ally of the Khmer Rouge while it was fighting against Lon Nol's Khmer Republic during the 1970–1975 civil war. Only after the Khmer Rouge took power did the Vietnamese opinion of Kampuchea become negative, when on 1 May 1975 (the day after Saigon fell), Khmer Rouge soldiers raided the islands of Phu Quoc and Tho Chau, killing more than five hundred Vietnamese civilians; following the attack, the islands were swiftly recaptured by Vietnam. Even then, the first reactions of the Vietnamese were ambiguous, and it took Vietnam a long time to react with force, for the first impulse was to arrange matters diplomatically "within the family sphere".

Massacres of ethnic Vietnamese and of their sympathisers, as well as destruction of Vietnamese Catholic churches, by the Khmer Rouge took place sporadically in Cambodia under the Democratic Kampuchea regime, especially in the Eastern Zone after May 1978. By early 1978, the Vietnamese leadership decided to support internal resistance to Pol Pot and the Eastern Zone of Cambodia became a focus of insurrection. In the meantime, as 1978 wore on, Khmer Rouge bellicosity in the border areas surpassed Hanoi's threshold of tolerance. War hysteria against Vietnam reached bizarre levels within Democratic Kampuchea as Pol Pot tried to distract attention from bloody inner purges.

In May 1978, on the eve of So Phim's Eastern Zone uprising, Radio Phnom Penh declared that if each Cambodian soldier killed thirty Vietnamese, only 2 million troops would be needed to eliminate the entire Vietnamese population of 50 million. It appears that the leadership in Phnom Penh was seized with immense territorial ambitions, i.e., to recover Kampuchea Krom, a region in the Mekong Delta which they regarded as Khmer territory. In November, pro-Vietnamese Khmer Rouge leader Vorn Vet led an unsuccessful coup d'état and was subsequently arrested, tortured and executed. Incidents escalated along all of Cambodia's borders. There were now tens of thousands of Cambodian and Vietnamese exiles on Vietnamese territory, and even so Hanoi's response was half-hearted.

=== Salvation Front ===
The Kampuchean United Front for National Salvation (KUFNS or FUNSK) was an organisation that would be pivotal in overthrowing the Khmer Rouge and establishing the PRK/SOC state. The Salvation Front was a heterogeneous group of communist and non-communist exiles determined to fight against Pol Pot and rebuild Cambodia. Led by Heng Samrin and Pen Sovann, both Khmer Rouge defectors, the organization occupied a zone liberated from the Khmer Rouge after the purge of the Eastern Zone. The front's foundation was announced by Radio Hanoi on 3 December 1978.

Of the Salvation Front's 14 central committee members, the top two leaders —Heng Samrin, president, and Joran Pollie, vice-president— had been "former" Kampuchean Communist Party (KCP) officials; others were former Khmer Issarak as well as "Khmer Viet Minh" – members who had lived in exile in Vietnam. Ros Samay, secretary general of the KUFNS, was a former KCP "staff assistant" in a military unit.

The government of Democratic Kampuchea lost no time in denouncing the KUFNS as "a Vietnamese political organisation with a Khmer name", because several of its key members had been affiliated with the KCP. Despite being dependent on Vietnamese protection and the backing of the Soviet Union behind the scenes, the KUFNS had an immediate success among exiled Cambodians. This organisation provided a much-needed rallying point for Cambodian leftists opposed to Khmer Rouge rule, channeling efforts towards positive action instead of empty denunciations of the genocidal regime. The KUFNS provided as well a framework of legitimacy for the ensuing invasion of Democratic Kampuchea by Vietnam and the subsequent establishment of a pro-Hanoi regime in Phnom Penh.

=== Vietnamese invasion ===
Vietnamese policymakers finally opted for a military solution and, on 22 December 1978, Vietnam launched its offensive with the intent of overthrowing Democratic Kampuchea. An invasion force of 120,000-150,000, composed of combined armour and infantry units with strong artillery support, drove west into the level countryside of Cambodia's southeastern provinces. After a seventeen-day blitzkrieg, Phnom Penh fell to the advancing Vietnamese on 7 January 1979. The retreating Kampuchea Revolutionary Army (RAK) and Khmer Rouge cadres burned rice granaries, which, along with other causes, provoked a severe famine all over Cambodia beginning in the last half of 1979 and which lasted until mid-1980.

On 1 January 1979, the Salvation Front's central committee proclaimed a set of "immediate policies" to be applied in the areas liberated from the Khmer Rouge. First the communal kitchens were abolished and some Buddhist monks would be brought to every community to reassure the people. Another of these policies was to establish "people's self-management committees" in all localities.

These committees would form the basic administrative structure for the Kampuchean People's Revolutionary Council (KPRC), decreed on 8 January 1979, as the central administrative body for the PRK. The KPRC served as the ruling body of the Heng Samrin regime until 27 June 1981, when a new Constitution required that it be replaced by a newly elected Council of Ministers. Pen Sovann became the new prime minister. He was assisted by three deputy prime ministers – Hun Sen, Chan Sy, and Chea Soth.

== History ==
=== Establishment of the People's Republic of Kampuchea (1979–1989) ===
On 8 January 1979, after the DK army had been routed and Phnom Penh captured by Vietnamese troops the day before, the KPRC proclaimed that the new official name of Cambodia was the People's Republic of Kampuchea (PRK). The new administration was a pro-Soviet government supported by a substantial Vietnamese military force and civilian advisory effort.

Despite the Vietnam-sponsored invasion and control, and the loss of independence that went along with it, the new order was welcomed by almost the entire Cambodian population due to the Khmer Rouge's brutality. However, there was some plundering of the almost empty capital of Phnom Penh by Vietnamese forces, who carried the goods on trucks back to Vietnam. This unfortunate behaviour would in time contribute to create a negative image of the Vietnamese soldiers. Heng Samrin was named head of state of the PRK, and other Khmer communists that had formed the Kampuchean People's Revolutionary Party, like Chan Sy and Hun Sen, were prominent from the start.

As events in the 1980s progressed, the main preoccupations of the new government would be survival, restoring the economy, and combating the Khmer Rouge insurgency by military and political means.

The PRK was a communist state. It continued the socialist revolution that had been started by DK, but abandoning the Khmer Rouge's radical policies and channelling the efforts of building socialism through more pragmatic channels in line with the policies marked by the Soviet Union and the Comecon. Very soon it would be one of the six countries regarded as socialist, and not just developing, by the USSR.

Regarding ethnic minorities, the People's Republic of Kampuchea was committed to respect Cambodia's national diversity, which brought some welcome relief to the ethnic Thai, Vietnamese, Cham and the "montagnards" of the northeast. The Chinese ethnic minority, however, perceived as an "arm of the hegemonists" continued to be oppressed, even though many of its members, mainly among the trader community, had endured great suffering under the Khmer Rouge. The speaking of Mandarin and Teochew was severely restricted, in much the same manner as under Pol Pot.

==== Restoration of cultural and religious life ====
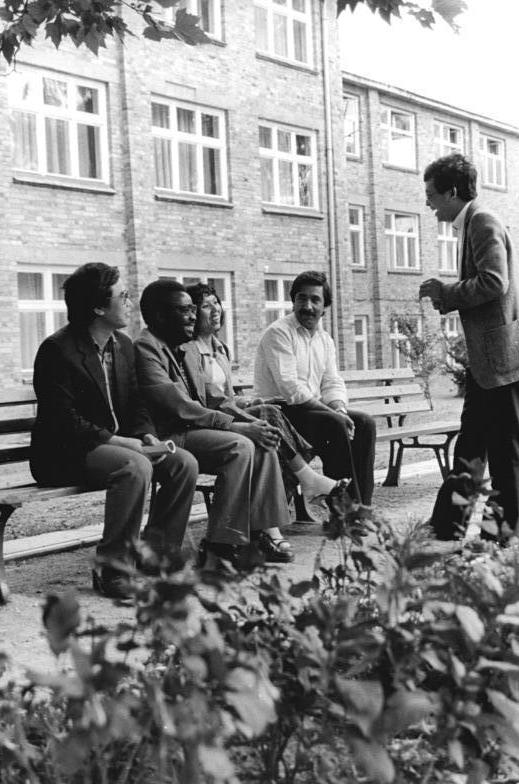
PRK students Meak Chanthan and Dima Yim (3rd from left and standing) in Bernau, East Germany in 1986.

One of the main official acts of the PRK was a partial restoration of Buddhism as the state religion of Cambodia and temples were gradually reopened to accommodate the monks and to resume a certain measure of traditional religious life. In September 1979 seven old monks were officially reordained at Wat Unnalom in Phnom Penh, and these monks gradually reestablished the Cambodian sangha between 1979 and 1981. They began rebuilding the community of monks in Phnom Penh and later in the provinces, reordaining prestigious monks who had been formerly senior monks. They were not allowed, however, to ordain young novices. Repair works were started in about 700 Buddhist temples and monasteries, of the roughly 3,600 that had been destroyed or badly damaged by the Khmer Rouge. By mid-1980 traditional Buddhist festivals began to be celebrated.

The DK had exterminated many Cambodian intellectuals, which was a difficult obstacle for Cambodia's reconstruction, when local leaders and experts were most needed. Among the surviving educated urban Cambodians who could have helped the struggling country to its feet, many opted to flee the communist state and flocked to the refugee camps to emigrate to the West.

The PRK's administration was technically unequipped and the state bureaucracy that had been destroyed by the Khmer Rouge was rebuilt slowly. The PRK managed to reopen the École de formation des cadres administratifs et judiciels, where in 1982 and 1986 training programmes were conducted. To rebuild the nation's intelligentsia, a number of Cambodians were sent to Eastern Bloc countries to study during the PRK's reconstruction period. Despite its efforts in the educational field, the PRK/SOC would struggle with the general lack of education and skills of Cambodian party cadres, bureaucrats and technicians throughout its existence.

Cambodian cultural life began also slowly to be rebuilt under the PRK. Movie houses in Phnom Penh were re-opened, screening at first films from Vietnam, the Soviet Union, Eastern European socialist countries and Hindi movies from India. Certain films that did not fit with the pro-Soviet designs of the PRK, such as Hong Kong action cinema, were banned in Cambodia at that time.

The domestic film industry had suffered a severe blow, for a large number of Cambodian filmmakers and actors from the 1960s and 1970s had been killed by the Khmer Rouge or had fled the country. Negatives and prints of many films had been destroyed, stolen, or missing and the films that did survive were in a poor state of quality. Cambodia's film industry began a slow comeback starting with Kon Aeuy Madai Ahp (Khmer: កូនអើយ ម្តាយអាប), also known as Krasue mother, a horror movie based on Khmer folklore about Ahp, a popular local ghost, the first movie made in Cambodia after the Khmer Rouge era. The restoration of cultural life during the PRK was only partial though; there were socialist-minded restrictions hampering creativity that would only be lifted towards the end of the 1980s under the SOC.

==== Propaganda ====
The PRK relied heavily on propaganda to motivate Cambodians for reconstruction, to promote unity and to establish its rule. Large billboards were displayed with patriotic slogans and party members taught the eleven points of the Kampuchean United Front for National Salvation (KUFNS) to assembled adults.

Survivors of Democratic Kampuchea rule lived in fear and uncertainty of the Khmer Rouge's return. Most Cambodians were psychologically affected and declared emphatically that they would not be able to survive another DK regime. The PRK government strongly encouraged such sentiments, for much of its legitimacy lay in having liberated Cambodia from Pol Pot's yoke. As a consequence, gruesome displays of skulls and bones, as well as photographs and paintings of Khmer Rouge atrocities, were set up and used as a pro-government propaganda tool. The most important museum about the Khmer Rouge era was located at the Tuol Sleng DK prison and was named "Tuol Sleng Museum of Genocidal Crimes", now Tuol Sleng Genocide Museum.

The annual Day of Remembrance, also known as "Day of Hatred" against the Khmer Rouge was instituted as part of the PRK's propaganda. Among the slogans chanted on the Day of Remembrance, one of the most often repeated was "We must absolutely prevent the return of the former black darkness" in Khmer.

==== Reconstruction hampered ====
At least 600,000 Cambodians had been displaced during the Pol Pot era when cities had been emptied. After the Vietnamese invasion freed them, most Cambodians who had been forcefully resettled elsewhere in the countryside returned to the cities or to their original rural homesteads. Since families had been disrupted and separated, many Cambodians freed from their communes wandered over the country searching for family members and friends.

Following the invasion there were severe famine conditions in the country, with some estimates reaching 500,000 affected.

Traditional farming had been so severely interfered with that it took time to be established anew. Meanwhile, the Khmer Rouge commune system had completely collapsed, following which there were no jobs and not enough food to eat. It took six months to begin the gradual repopulation of Phnom Penh, as electricity, water and sewage systems were reestablished and street repair and removal of garbage were undertaken.

The destruction of Cambodian social institutions during the "Year Zero" period (1975–1979) had been thorough. It had left the PRK with little to start with, for there were no police, no schools, no books, no hospitals, no post and telecommunications, no legal system and no broadcasting networks, either for television or radio, whether state-owned or private.

To compound the situation for Cambodia, the Western nations, China and the ASEAN states refused to provide reconstruction assistance directly to the new government. Owing to US and China's opposition to the international recognition of the PRK, the United Nations relief and rehabilitation agencies were not allowed to operate within Cambodia by the UN authorities. The little developmental help that was available came only from the Eastern Bloc nations; among these only the Socialist Republic of Romania would refuse assistance to the PRK. The bulk of international help and aid from Western nations would be diverted to refugee camps along the Thai border.

==== Refugee situation ====
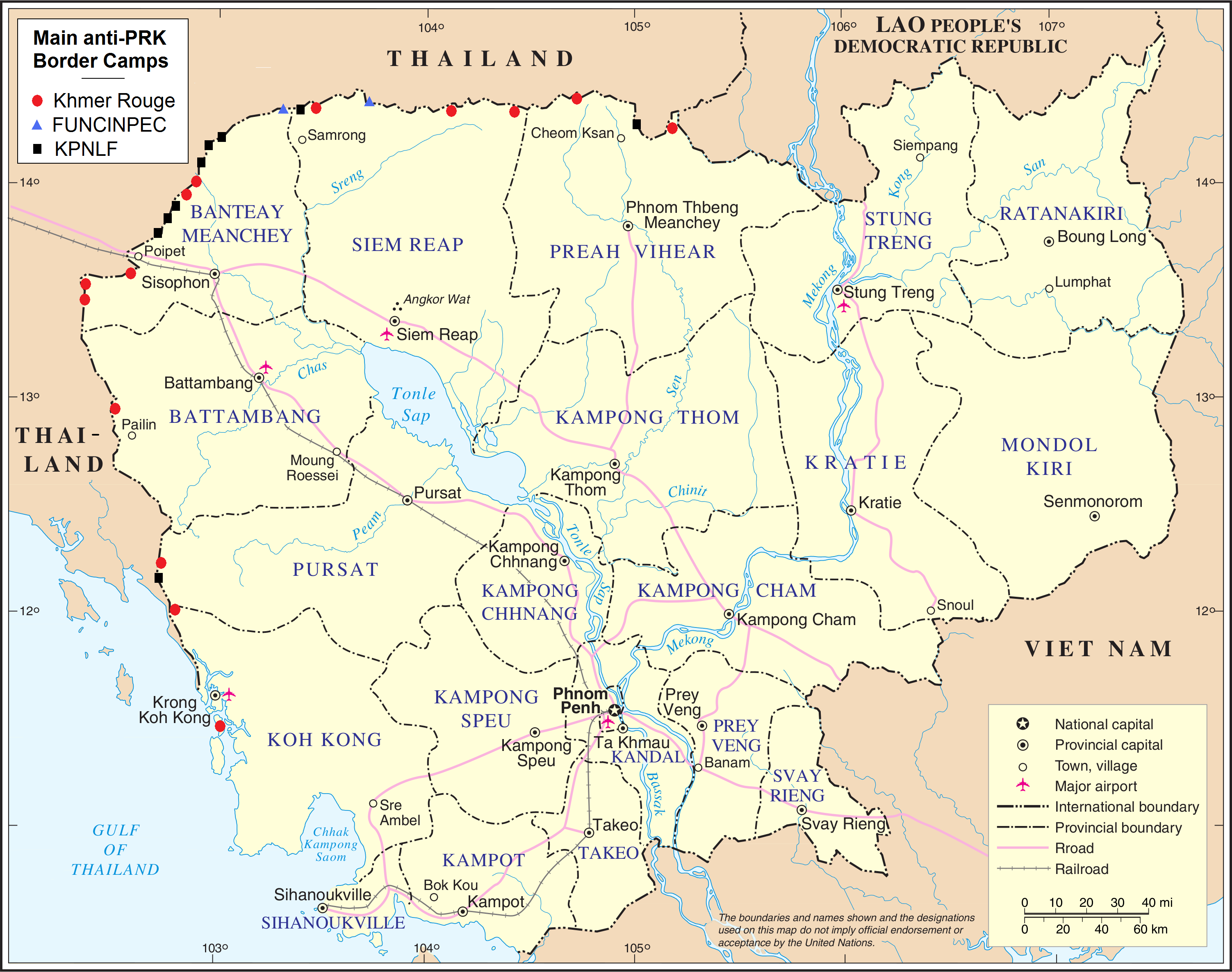
A map of camps along the Thai-Cambodian border hostile to the PRK, 1979–1984

Faced with a destroyed country and lack of international aid, large numbers of distraught Cambodians flocked to the Thai border in the years that followed. There, international help provided by different international aid organisations, many of them backed by the United States, was available. At one point, more than 500,000 Cambodians were living along the Thai-Cambodian border and more than 100,000 in holding centres inside Thailand.

More than US$400 million was provided between 1979 and 1982, of which the United States, as part of its Cold War political strategy against communist Vietnam, contributed nearly $100 million. In 1982, the US government had initiated a covert aid program to the non-communist resistance (NCR) amounting to $5 million per year, ostensibly for non-lethal aid only. This amount was increased to $8 million in 1984 and $12 million in 1987 and 1988.

In late 1988, the United States pared back Central Intelligence Agency funding to $8 million, following reports that $3.5 million had been diverted by the Thai military. At the same time, the Reagan Administration gave new flexibility to the funds, permitting the NCR to purchase US-made weapons in Singapore and other regional markets. In 1985, the United States established a separate, overt aid program to the non-communist resistance which came to be known as the Solarz Fund after one of its chief sponsors, Rep. Stephen Solarz. The overt aid program channelled about $5 million per year to the non-communist resistance through USAID.

Meanwhile, a sizeable portion of Pol Pot's Khmer Rouge forces regrouped and received a continuous and abundant supply of military equipment from China, channelled across Thailand with the co-operation of the Royal Thai Armed Forces. Along with other armed factions, the Khmer Rouge launched a relentless military campaign against the newly established People's Republic of Kampuchea state from the refugee camps and from hidden military outposts along the Thai border. Even though the Khmer Rouge was dominant, the non-communist resistance included a number of groups which had formerly been fighting against the Khmer Rouge after 1975.

These groups included Lon Nol-era soldiers —-coalesced in 1979–80 to form the Khmer People's National Liberation Armed Forces (KPNLAF)— which pledged loyalty to former Prime Minister Son Sann, and Moulinaka (Mouvement pour la Libération Nationale du Kampuchea), loyal to Prince Norodom Sihanouk. In 1979, Son Sann formed the Khmer People's National Liberation Front (KPNLF) to lead the political struggle for Cambodia's independence. Prince Sihanouk formed his own organisation, FUNCINPEC, and its military arm, the Armée Nationale Sihanoukienne (ANS) in 1981.

Fraught with both internal and mutual discord, the non-communist groups opposing the PRK, were never very effective, so that all through the civil war against the KPRAF/CPAF the only seriously organised fighting force against the state was the former Khmer Rouge militia, ironically labelled as the "Resistance". This armed faction would wreak much havoc in Cambodia even after the restoration of the monarchy, well into the 1990s.

==== Civil war ====
This protracted civil war would bleed Cambodia's energies throughout the 1980s. Vietnam's occupation army of as many as 200,000 troops controlled the major population centres and most of the countryside from 1979 to September 1989, but Heng Samrin's 30,000 KPRAF troops were plagued by poor morale and widespread desertion owing to low pay and poverty. Men were directly needed in their family farms as they were being rebuilt and there was much work to do.

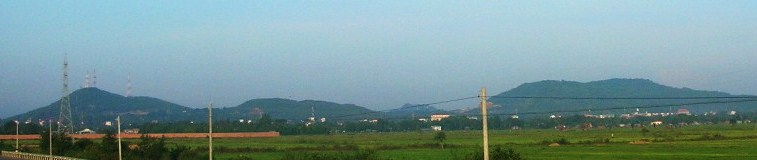
Mountains along the Cambodian-Thai Border north of the road between Sisophon and Aranyaprathet. One of the areas where Khmer Rouge insurgents hid at the time of the K5 Plan.

The civil war followed a wet season/dry season rhythm after 1980. The heavily armed Vietnamese forces conducted offensive operations during the dry seasons, and the Chinese-backed insurgency held the initiative during the rainy seasons. In 1982, Vietnam launched a major offensive against the main Khmer Rouge base at Phnom Malai in the Cardamom Mountains. But this operation met with little success.

The Vietnamese concentrated on consolidating their gains through the K5 Plan, an extravagant and labour-intensive attempt to seal guerrilla infiltration routes into the country by means of trenches, wire fences, and minefields along virtually the entire Thai-Cambodian border. The K5 border defence project, designed by Vietnamese general Lê Đức Anh, commander of the Vietnamese forces in Cambodia, irritated Cambodian farmers and ended up being psychologically counterproductive for the PRK. Large swathes of formerly inaccessible tropical forests were destroyed, leaving a negative ecological legacy.

Despite the help of the Vietnamese Army, as well as of Soviet, Cuban and Vietnamese advisers, Heng Samrin had only limited success in establishing the PRK in the face of the ongoing civil war. Security in some rural areas was tenuous, and major transportation routes were subject to interdiction by sporadic attacks. The presence of Vietnamese throughout the country and their intrusion into Cambodian life added fuel to the traditional Cambodian anti-Vietnamese sentiment.

In 1986, Hanoi claimed to have begun withdrawing part of its occupation forces. At the same time, Vietnam continued efforts to strengthen the PRK and its military arm, the Kampuchean People's Revolutionary Armed Forces (KPRAF). These withdrawals continued over the next two years, although actual numbers were difficult to verify. Vietnam's proposal to withdraw its remaining occupation forces in 1989–90—one of the repercussions of the dismemberment of the Soviet bloc as well as the result of the US and Chinese pressure—forced the PRK to begin economic and constitutional reforms in an attempt to ensure future political dominance. In April 1989, Hanoi and Phnom Penh announced that final withdrawal would take place by the end of September the same year.

=== State of Cambodia (1989–1992) ===
On 29–30 April 1989, the National Assembly of the PRK, presided over by Hun Sen, held a meeting in order to make some, at first, largely cosmetic constitutional changes. The name "People's Republic of Kampuchea" was officially changed to the State of Cambodia (SOC)—a name that had been previously used right after the 1970 coup—reintroducing the blue colour in the Cambodian flag and other state symbols, although the coat of arms remained almost the same. The national anthem and the military symbols were also changed.

The name "Kampuchean People’s Revolutionary Armed Forces" (KPRAF) were changed to "Cambodian People's Armed Forces" (CPAF). Capital punishment was officially abolished and Buddhism, which had been partially reestablished by the PRK in 1979, was fully reintroduced as the national religion, by which the restriction was lifted on the ordination of men under 50 years old and Buddhist traditional chanting was resumed in the media. Following the complete normalisation of traditional religious life, Buddhism became extremely popular in Cambodia, experiencing a widespread revival.

Intending to liberalise Cambodia's economy, a set of laws on "Personal Ownership" and "Free Market Orientation" was passed as well. The new Constitution stated that Cambodia was a neutral and non-aligned state. The ruling party also announced that there would be negotiations with the groups of the opposition.

The State of Cambodia lived through a time of dramatic transitions triggered by the collapse of communism in the Soviet Union and Eastern Europe. There was a reduction in Soviet aid to Vietnam which culminated in the withdrawal of the Vietnamese occupying forces. The last Vietnamese troops were said to have left Cambodia on 26 September 1989 but probably they did not leave until 1990. Many Vietnamese civilians also returned to Vietnam in the months that followed, lacking confidence in the ability of the PRK's new avatar to control the situation after the Vietnamese military had left.

Despite the quite radical changes announced by Hun Sen, the SOC state stood firm when it came to the one party rule issue. The leadership structure and the executive remained the same as under the PRK, with the party firmly in control as the supreme authority. Accordingly, the SOC was unable to restore Cambodia's monarchical tradition. Although the SOC reestablished the prominence of monarchical symbols, like the grand palace in Phnom Penh, that was as far as it would go for the time being, especially since Norodom Sihanouk had steadfastly associated himself with the CGDK, the opposition coalition against the PRK that included the Khmer Rouge.

In mid-1991, however, succumbing to a number of pressures both within and outside of the country, the government of the State of Cambodia signed an agreement that recognised Prince Norodom Sihanouk as head of state. By late 1991 Sihanouk made an official visit to the SOC and both Hun Sen and Chea Sim took a leading role in the welcoming ceremony.

Still, fissures appeared on the monolithic structure that the State of Cambodia was trying to preserve. Revolutionary idealism was replaced by practical cynicism, so that corruption increased. Cambodian state resources were sold without benefitting the state and high placed civil and military individuals in key posts of authority enriched themselves by pocketing whatever benefits they could grab. The result of this moral breakdown was that students revolted in the streets of Phnom Penh in December 1991. The police opened fire and eight people died in the confrontations.

Conditions for ethnic Chinese improved greatly after 1989. Restrictions placed on them by the former PRK gradually disappeared. The State of Cambodia allowed ethnic Chinese to observe their particular religious customs and Chinese language schools were reopened. In 1991, two years after the SOC's foundation, the Chinese New Year was officially celebrated in Cambodia for the first time since 1975.

==== Peace agreement ====
Peace negotiations between the Vietnam-backed regime in Cambodia and its armed opposition groups had begun formally and informally after the mid-1980s. The negotiations were extremely difficult, for the Khmer Rouge stubbornly insisted in the dismantlement of the PRK/SOC's administration before any agreement could be reached, while the PRK/SOC leadership made it a point of excluding the Khmer Rouge from any future provisional government. Finally it would be outside historical events, in the form of the Fall of Communism and the ensuing collapse of Soviet support for Vietnam and the PRK, that would bring the PRK/SOC to the negotiating table.

The haphazard efforts towards conciliation in Cambodia culminated in the Paris Agreements in 1991, in which United Nations-sponsored free and fair elections were scheduled for 1993. As a result, Cambodia came under United Nations administration, with the establishment of the United Nations Transitional Authority in Cambodia (UNTAC) at the end of February 1992 which supervised the cease-fire and the ensuing general election. The state was finally dissolved with the restoration of the Kingdom of Cambodia in September 1993.

== The one-party system in the PRK/SOC ==
The "Kampuchean (or Khmer) People's Revolutionary Party" (KPRP) was the sole ruling party in Cambodia from the foundation of the pro-Vietnam republic in 1979, as well as during the transitional times under the SOC in 1991, when it was renamed the Cambodian People's Party (CPP) at the beginning of the UN-sponsored peace and reconciliation process.

Many members of the Kampuchean People's Revolutionary Party were former Khmer Rouge members who had fled to Vietnam after witnessing the wholesale destruction of Cambodian society as a result of the regime's radical agrarian socialist and xenophobic policies. Several prominent KPRP members, including Heng Samrin and Hun Sen, were Khmer Rouge cadres near the Cambodian-Vietnamese border who participated in the Vietnamese invasion that toppled the Khmer Rouge.

Founded in June 1981, the KPRP began as a firmly Marxist–Leninist party within the PRK. However, in the mid-1980s it took on a more reformist outlook when some members pointed out problems with collectivisation and concluded that private property should play a role in Cambodian society. The extreme collectivisation of the Khmer Rouge had caused severe burn-out and distrust among farmers, who refused to work collectively as soon as the threat of the Khmer Rouge disappeared from the liberated areas.

Therefore, PRK government policies had to be implemented carefully to win back the rural population's trust and to alleviate the prevailing conditions of poverty. This led eventually to the effective reinstitutionalisation of the traditional Cambodian family economy and to some more radical change of policies regarding privatisation during the State of Cambodia time (1989–1993). Despite the watered-down ideology the KPRP/CPP remained firmly in control of Cambodia until 1993.

Among the most significant policy shifts of the SOC was putting aside Marxism–Leninism as the party's ideology in 1991. This move effectively marked the end of the socialist revolutionary state in Cambodia, a form of government which had begun in 1975 when the Khmer Rouge took over.

Hun Sen, the former Prime Minister of Cambodia, was a key figure in the KPRP and is the current leader of its successor party, the CPP, a party that no longer lays claim to socialist credentials.

== International relations ==
=== Eastern Bloc ===
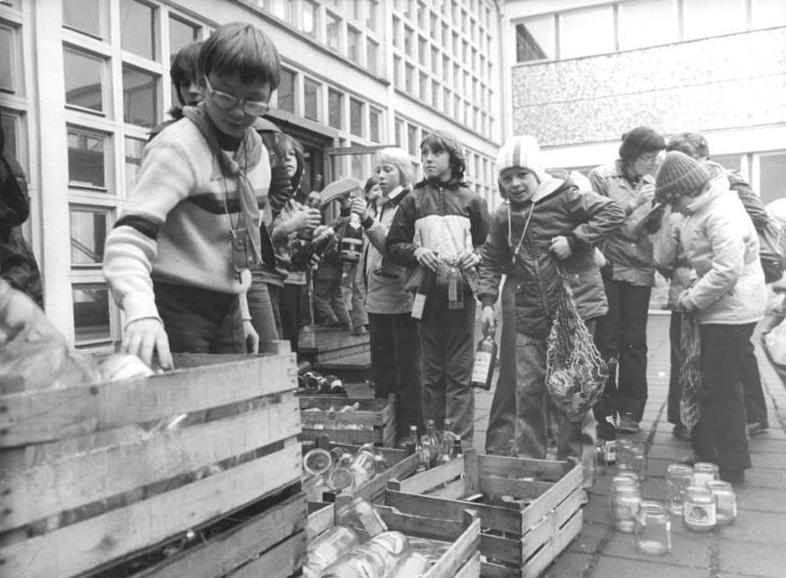
Aid to Kampuchea in Zella-Mehlis, East Germany, during the 1979/1980 famine that ravaged Cambodia right after the birth of the PRK.

After the KPRC proclaimed in January 1979 that the new official name of Cambodia was the "People's Republic of Kampuchea" (PRK), the newly established government notified the United Nations Security Council that it was the sole legitimate government of the Cambodian people. Vietnam was the first country to recognise the new regime, and Phnom Penh immediately restored diplomatic relations with Hanoi. On 18 February, Heng Samrin on behalf of the PRK and Phạm Văn Đồng on behalf of the Socialist Republic of Vietnam signed a twenty-five-year Treaty of Peace, Friendship and Cooperation.

The Soviet Union, East Germany, Bulgaria, Poland, Czechoslovakia, Hungary, Laos, Mongolia, Cuba, South Yemen, Afghanistan, Ethiopia, Congo, Benin, and other Eastern Bloc states, as well as a number of Soviet-friendly developing countries, like India, followed Vietnam in recognizing the new regime. By January 1980, twenty-nine countries had recognized the PRK, yet nearly eighty countries continued to recognize the Khmer Rouge.

In turn, the regime based its symbols, slogans and ideology on those of the Soviet Union. Its military uniform and insignia also largely copied Soviet-style patterns.

Despite the previous international outcry and concern surrounding Pol Pot's DK regime's gross human rights violations it would prove difficult for the PRK/SOC government to gain international recognition beyond the Soviet Bloc sphere.

=== United Nations ===
A draft resolution by the People's Republic of China sought to condemn Vietnam in the UN Security Council after its invasion for "its acts of armed invasion and aggression against Democratic Kampuchea, acts which ... cause serious damage to the lives and property of the Kampuchean people".

As a result of the vehement campaign against the PRK, the Khmer Rouge retained its UN seat despite its genocidal record. Cambodia would be represented at the UN by Thiounn Prasith, Pol Pot and Ieng Sary's crony since their student days in Paris. The seat of Democratic Kampuchea's regime lasted for three years at the United Nations after the fall of Pol Pot's regime in Cambodia. Only in 1982 would it be renamed as 'Coalition Government of Democratic Kampuchea'. The CGDK would hold the seat until 1993, when the SOC gave way to the restoration of the Cambodian monarchy.

To refer to Cambodia as a state, the General Assembly of the United Nations continued using the terms "Democratic Kampuchea" and "Kampuchea" for over a decade. It decided to start using the term "Cambodia" only at the 45th session in 1990, when the transitional phase of the SOC was well on its way.

=== China, East Asia and the West ===
The government of the People's Republic of China, which had consistently supported the Khmer Rouge, quickly labelled the PRK as "Vietnam's puppet state" and declared it unacceptable. Thailand and Singapore were very vocal in their opposition to Vietnamese expansion and influence; the Singaporean representative stated that recognition of the PRK would "violate the UN's non-intervention principle." International forums, like ASEAN meetings and the UN General Assembly would be used to condemn the PRK and the genocide of the Khmer Rouge was removed from the centre stage of attention and Pol Pot effectively won the support of the US and most of Europe against Vietnam.

China and most Western governments, as well as a number of African, Asian and Latin American states repeatedly backed the Khmer Rouge in the U.N. and voted in favour of DK retaining Cambodia's seat in the organisation at the expense of the PRK. British Prime Minister Margaret Thatcher famously explained she believed that there were some among the Khmer Rouge "more reasonable" than Pol Pot.

The government of Sweden, however, had to change its vote in the U.N. and to withdraw support for the Khmer Rouge after a large number of Swedish citizens wrote letters to their elected representatives demanding a policy change towards Pol Pot's regime. France remained neutral on the issue, claiming that neither side had the right to represent Cambodia at the UN.

In the years that followed, the United States, under the staunch anti-Soviet "rollback" strategy of the Reagan Doctrine would support what it perceived as "anti-communist resistance movements" in Soviet-allied nations. The largest movement fighting Cambodia's communist government was largely made up of members of the former Khmer Rouge regime, whose human rights record was among the worst of the 20th century. Therefore, Reagan authorised the provision of aid to a smaller Cambodian resistance movement, a coalition called the Khmer People's National Liberation Front, known as the KPNLF and then run by Son Sann; in an effort to force an end to the Vietnamese occupation. Eventually, the Vietnamese withdrew, and Cambodia's communist regime accepted a democratic transition. Then, under United Nations supervision, free elections were held.

Ben Kiernan claimed that the US had offered support to the Khmer Rouge after the Vietnamese invasion. Other sources have disputed these claims, and described "extensive fighting" between the US-backed forces of the Khmer People's National Liberation Front and the Khmer Rouge. However, despite these responses, it is documented that the US provided diplomatic support to the Khmer Rouge by continuously voting for the Khmer Rouge to retain its seat at the United Nations, both immediately after its ousting as well as after it joined the coalition.

== Constitution ==
=== First draft ===
On 10 January 1980, the People's Revolutionary Council named Ros Samay to lead a council to draft the Constitution. He carefully wrote it in Khmer using clear and easy language whenever possible, mindful that every Cambodian should understand it. He took the constitutions of Vietnam, East Germany, the USSR, Hungary and Bulgaria, as well as previous Cambodian constitutions (Kingdom of Cambodia, Khmer Republic), as a reference. Since Ros Samay's draft failed to please the Vietnamese, he was publicly discredited and his draft scrapped.

=== Constitution approved by Vietnam ===
The wording of the PRK's constitution stressed the relations between the PRK regime and Vietnam. Prime Minister Pen Sovann acknowledged that the Vietnamese "insisted on changing some clauses they didn't agree with". Finally, on 27 June 1981, a new Constitution was promulgated that pleased the Vietnamese. It defined Cambodia as "a democratic state...gradually advancing toward socialism." The transition to socialism was to take place under the leadership of the Marxist–Leninist KPRP. The Constitution explicitly placed Cambodia within the Soviet Union's orbit. The country's primary enemies, according to the Constitution, were "the Chinese expansionists and hegemonists in Beijing, acting in collusion with United States imperialism and other powers."

While technically guaranteeing a "broad range of civil liberties and fundamental rights", the Constitution placed a number of restrictions. For example, "an act may not injure the honor of other persons, nor should it adversely affect the mores and customs of society, or public order, or national security." In line with the principle of socialist collectivism, citizens were obligated to carry out "the state's political line and defend collective property."

The Constitution also addressed principles governing culture, education, social welfare, and public health. Development of language, literature, the arts, and science and technology was stressed, along with the need for cultural preservation, tourist promotion, and cultural co-operation with foreign countries.

Provisions for state organs were in the constitutional chapters dealing with the National Assembly, the Council of State, the Council of Ministers, the local people's revolutionary committees, and the judiciary. Fundamental to the operation of all public bodies was the principle that the Marxist–Leninist KPRP served as the most important political institution of the state. Intermediary linkages between the state bureaucracy and grass-roots activities were provided by numerous organisations affiliated with the Kampuchean United Front for National Salvation (KUFNS).

=== Constitution of the SOC ===
The constitution was revised in 1989 to accommodate the market-oriented policies of the newly formed "State of Cambodia". This state was basically a continuation of the PRK regime adapted to the new realities dictated by the collapse of the Soviet bloc, when Mikhail Gorbachev reduced to a minimum Soviet support for Vietnam and Cambodia. Suddenly the Cambodian leadership found itself scrambling for favour abroad, which included the need to open its markets, the gradual abandoning of its original pro-Soviet stance and the pressure to find some accommodation with the factions warring against it.

The PRK's Constitution had not made any mention of a Head of State, perhaps reserving this role for Sihanouk; however, the traditional functions of a head of state - representing the state in diplomatic relations and ceremonial functions - were vested in the Council of State as a collective body, on the model of the Presidium of the Supreme Soviet of the USSR and the East German Council of State. The State of Cambodia Constitution went beyond this simple assignment of functions, and outright stated that the President of the Council of State would be the "Head of State of Cambodia".

== Government structure ==
An administrative infrastructure functioning under the Marxist–Leninist KPRC was more or less in place between 1979 and 1980. With the promulgation of the Constitution in June 1981, new organs, such as the National Assembly, the Council of State, and the Council of Ministers, assumed certain functions that the KPRC had provided. These new bodies evolved slowly. It was not until February 1982 that the National Assembly enacted specific laws for these bodies.

Despite the presence of Vietnamese advisors, the government of the PRK was made up entirely of Cambodian KUFNS members. Initially the Vietnamese advisors, like Lê Đức Thọ, had promised that they would not interfere with Cambodian internal affairs. However, as soon as the PRK was formed and the KUFNS was in power, Lê Đức Thọ, acting as liaison chief between Hanoi and Phnom Penh, broke his promise. Henceforward the members of the Government of the PRK had to walk a narrow path between Cambodian nationalism and "Indochinese solidarity" with Vietnam, which meant making sure they didn't irritate their Vietnamese patrons. PRK government members, no matter how highly placed, who offended the Vietnamese, whether intentionally or not, were swiftly denounced and purged. Among these were Ros Samai, Pen Sovann and Chan Sy. The latter, a founding member of the KUNFS who had reached the post of Prime Minister, died in mysterious circumstances in 1984 in Moscow.

=== National Assembly ===
The supreme state organ of power was the National Assembly, whose deputies are directly elected for five-year terms. The assembly's 117 seats were filled on 1 May 1981, the date of the PRK's first elections. (The KUFNS had nominated 148 candidates.) The voter turnout was reported as 99.17 percent of the electorate, which was divided into 20 electoral districts.

During its first session in June, the assembly adopted the new Constitution and elected members of the state organs set up under the Constitution. The assembly had been empowered to adopt or to amend the Constitution and the laws and to oversee their implementation; to determine domestic and foreign policies; to adopt economic and cultural programs and the state budget; and to elect or to remove its own officers and members of the Council of State and of the Council of Ministers. The assembly also was authorised to levy, revise, or abolish taxes; to decide on amnesties; and to ratify or to abrogate international treaties. As in other communist states, the assembly's real function is to endorse the legislative and administrative measures initiated by the Council of State and by the Council of Ministers, both of which serve as agents of the ruling KPRP.

The National Assembly met typically twice a year. During the periods between its sessions, legislative functions were handled by the Council of State. Bills were introduced by the Council of State, the Council of Ministers, the assembly's several commissions (legislative committees), chairman of the KUFNCD, and heads of other organisations. Individual deputies were not entitled to introduce bills.

Once bills, state plans and budgets, and other measures were introduced, they were studied first by the assembly's commissions. Then they went to the assembly for adoption. While ordinary bills were passed by a simple majority, constitutional amendments required a two-thirds majority. The Council of State had to promulgate an adopted bill within thirty days of its passage. Another function of the assembly was to oversee the affairs of the Council of Ministers, which functions as the cabinet. Assembly members were not entitled to call for votes of confidence in the cabinet. Conversely, the Council of Ministers was not empowered to dissolve the National Assembly.

The Constitution stated that in case of war or under "other exceptional circumstances," the five-year life of the Assembly may be extended by decree. In 1986 the assembly's term was extended for another five years, until 1991.

Chairman National Assembly (1985): Chea Sim

Vice chairmen: Math Ly, Tep Vong, Nu Beng

=== Council of State ===
The National Assembly elected seven of its members to the Council of State. The chairman of the council served as the head of state, but the power to serve as ex officio supreme commander of the armed forces was deleted from the final draft of the Constitution.

The council's seven members were among the most influential leaders of the PRK. Between sessions of the National Assembly, the Council of State carried out the assembly's duties. It may appoint or remove (on the recommendation of the Council of Ministers) cabinet ministers, ambassadors, and envoys accredited to foreign governments. Foreign diplomatic envoys presented their letters of accreditation to the Council of State.

Council of State (1985):

- Chairman: Heng Samrin
- Vice-chairman: Say Phouthang

=== Council of Ministers ===
The government's top executive organ was the Council of Ministers, or cabinet, which in late 1987 was headed by Hun Sen (as it had been since January 1985). Apart from the prime minister (formally called chairman), the Council of Ministers had two deputy prime ministers (vice chairmen) and twenty ministers. The National Assembly elected the council's ministers for five-year terms.

The Council of Ministers met weekly in an executive session. Decisions made in the executive sessions were "collective," whereas those in the plenary sessions were by a majority. Representatives of KUFNCD and other mass organisations, to which all citizens may belong, were sometimes invited to attend plenary sessions of the council "when [it was] discussing important issues." These representatives could express their views but they were not allowed to vote.

Government ministries were in charge of agriculture; communications, transport, and posts; education; finance; foreign affairs; health; home and foreign trade; industry; information and culture; interior; justice; national defence; planning; and social affairs and invalids. In addition, the cabinet includes a minister for agricultural affairs and rubber plantations, who was attached to the Office of the Council of Ministers; a minister in charge of the Office of the Council of Ministers; a secretary general of the Office of the Council of Ministers, who was also in charge of transport and of Khmer-Thai border defence networks; a director of the State Affairs Inspectorate; and the president-director general of the People's National Bank of Kampuchea.

Council of Ministers (1985):

- Chairman: Hun Sen (and Minister Foreign Affairs)
- Vice chairmen: Chea Soth, Bou Thang, Kong Sam, Tea Banh, Say Chhum

=== Judiciary ===
The restoration of law and order was one of the more pressing tasks of the Heng Samrin regime. Since 1979 the administration of justice was in the hands of people's revolutionary courts that were set up hastily in Phnom Penh and in other major provincial cities. A new law dealing with the organisation of courts and with the Office of Public Prosecutor was promulgated in February 1982. Under this law, the People's Supreme Court became the highest court of the land.

The judicial system comprised the people's revolutionary courts, the military tribunals, and the public prosecutors' offices. The Council of Ministers, on the recommendations of local administrative bodies called people's revolutionary committees, appointed judges and public prosecutors.

=== Administrative divisions ===
In late 1987, the country was divided into 18 provinces (khet) and 2 special municipalities (krong), Phnom Penh and Kampong Saom, which were under direct central government control.

The provinces were subdivided into about 122 districts (srok), 1,325 communes (khum), and 9,386 villages (phum). The subdivisions of the municipalities were wards (sangkat).

=== Local People's Revolutionary Committees ===
An elective body, consisting of a chairman (president), one or more vice chairmen, and a number of committee members, ran each people's revolutionary committee. These elective bodies were chosen by representatives of the next lower level people's revolutionary committees at the provincial and district levels.

At the provincial and district levels, where the term of office was five years, committee members needed the additional endorsement of officials representing the KUFNCD and other affiliated mass organisations. At the commune and ward level, the members of the people's revolutionary committees are elected directly by local inhabitants for a three-year term.

Before the first local elections, which were held in February and March 1981, the central government appointed local committee officials. In late 1987, it was unclear whether the chairpersons of the local revolutionary committees reported to the Office of the Council of Ministers or to the Ministry of Interior.

=== Military ===
KPRAF roundel (1979–1989)

CPAF roundel (1989–1993)

KPRAF fin flash (1979–1989)

CPAF fin flash (1989–1993)

The regular armed forces of the People's Republic of Kampuchea were the Kampuchean People's Revolutionary Armed Forces (KPRAF). These were needed to project internationally the image of the new pro-Hanoi administration in Phnom Penh as a legitimate sovereign state. Raising such an indigenous force was not too difficult for the Vietnamese occupiers at the time, because the Vietnamese already had experience training and co-ordinating the army in neighbouring Laos.

The KPRAF was formed initially from militias, former Khmer Rouge members, and conscripts. KPRAF troops were trained and supplied by the Vietnamese armed forces. But owing to a lack of proper training and weapons, meagre salaries and mass desertions, the fledgling KPRAF was not an effective fighting force and the bulk of the fighting against the CGDK forces was left in the end to the army of the occupiers, the People's Army of Vietnam.

The Khmer Rouge forced the Vietnamese to employ guerrilla warfare as one of their tactics. As years went by the Vietnamese suffered damaging casualties, and the persistent civil war debilitated Cambodia and hampered reconstruction efforts. The Khmer Rouge gained confidence that they could keep swiping away Vietnamese armies, and the Vietnamese found out how easy it is to become the prey rather than the predator. In fact some books have called this "Vietnam's Vietnam War".

The KPRAF was answerable to two organisations below the Council of State, namely, the Ministry of National Defense and the General Staff. Veterans from the Eastern Zone revolution, especially those from Kampong Cham, Svay Rieng, as well as people who had been educated in Vietnam after the 1954 Geneva Conference held important positions in the Ministry of National Defense. Control of the KPRAF military establishment and its adherence to the political orthodoxy of the Kampuchean (or Khmer) People's Revolutionary Party (KPRP) were ensured by a party network, superimposed upon the national defence structure, that extended downward to units at all echelons.

The KPRAF developed also a system of military justice, with military tribunals, as well as a network of military prisons.

In 1989 began the transition that culminated in the 1991 Paris Peace Agreements. After the name of the People's Republic of Kampuchea had been officially changed to State of Cambodia (SOC), the KPRAF were renamed the Cambodian People's Armed Forces (CPAF). Following the 1993 elections the CPAF were absorbed into a new national army of Royalist, Nationalist and CPAF troops.

== See also ==
- Cold War § Third World escalations
- Kampuchean United Front for National Salvation
- Kampuchean People's Revolutionary Armed Forces
- K5 Plan
- Modern Cambodia
- Politics of Cambodia
- Cambodian–Vietnamese War
- Hun Sen

== Bibliography ==
- Bekaert, Jacques, Cambodian Diary, Vol. 1: Tales of a Divided Nation 1983–1986, White Lotus Press, Bangkok 1997, ISBN 974-8496-95-3, & Vol. 2: A Long Road to Peace 1987–1993, White Lotus Press, Bangkok 1998, ISBN 978-974-8496-95-5
- Harris, Ian, Buddhism in Extremis: The Case of Cambodia, in Buddhism and Politics in Twentieth-Century Asia, edited by Ian Harris, 54–78 (London, New York: Pinter, 1999). ISBN 1-85567-598-6
- Gottesman, Evan, Cambodia after the Khmer Rouge: Inside the politics of Nation Building.
- Kiernan, Ben and Caroline Hughes (eds). Conflict and Change in Cambodia. Critical Asian Studies 34(4) (December 2002)
- Silber, Irwin, Kampuchea: The Revolution Rescued, Oakland, 1986
- Volkmann, Toby Alice, Cambodia 1990. Special edition. Cultural Survival Quarterly 14(3) 1990
