= Kampuchean United Front for National Salvation =

United front of mass organizations in 1980s Cambodia

- រណសិរ្សសាមគ្គីសង្គ្រោះជាតិកម្ពុជា (Khmer); Front uni national pour le salut du Kampuchéa (French)
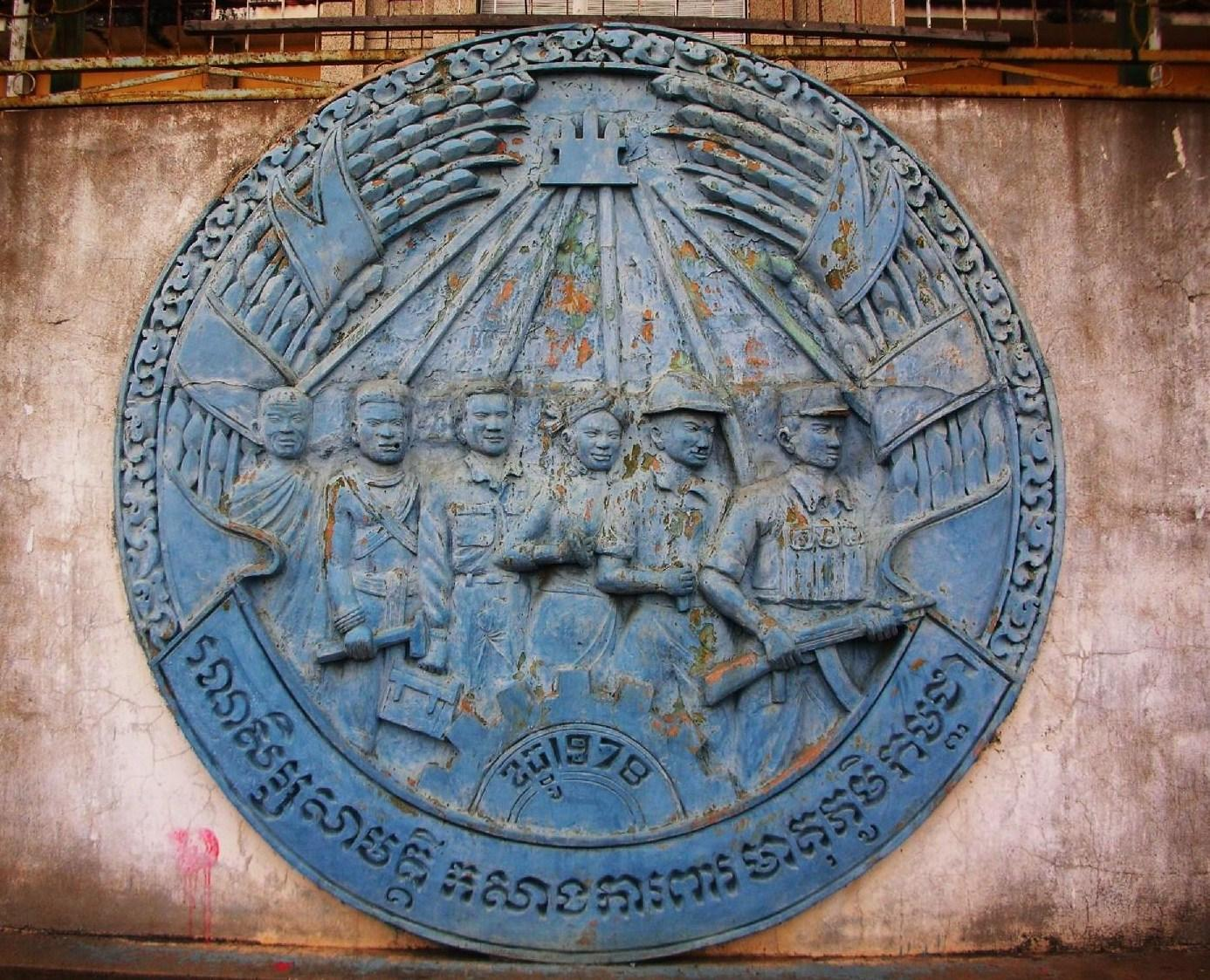
- Emblem of the FUNSK at the former head office in Phnom Penh
- Leader: Heng Samrin
- Dates active: 2 December 1978 – 1981
- Allegiance: Kampuchean People's Revolutionary Party
- Active regions: Cambodia (Liberated Area)
- Ideology: Communism; Marxism–Leninism

The FUNSK selected a red background flag with the silhouette of Angkor Wat having five yellow spires, declaring it the flag of the People's Republic of Kampuchea.

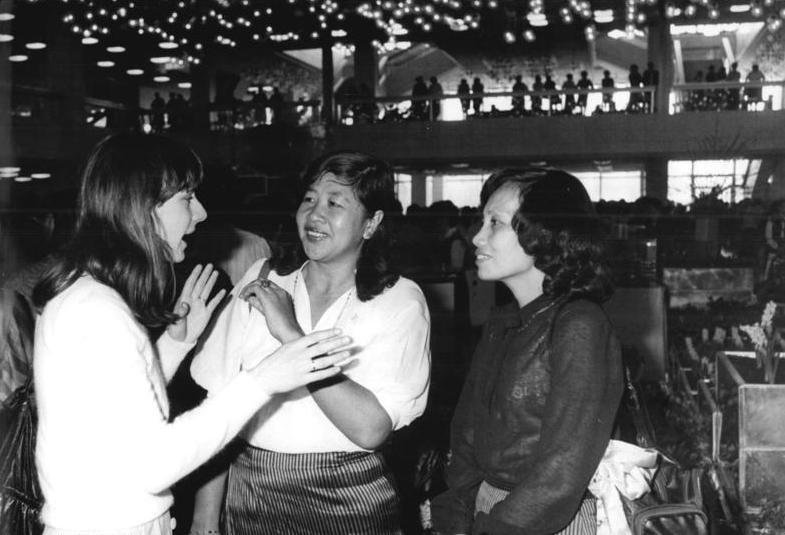
Kampuchea Revolutionary Women's Association (KRWA) leaders Nuth Kim Lay and Res Sivanna in East Germany at the Democratic Women's League of Germany-Congress in 1987

The Kampuchean United Front for National Salvation (Khmer: រណសិរ្សសាមគ្គីសង្គ្រោះជាតិកម្ពុជា, UNGEGN: Rônâsĕrs Samôkki Sângkrŏăh Chéatĕ Kâmpŭchéa; French: Front uni national pour le salut du Kampuchéa, FUNSK), often simply referred to as Salvation Front, was the nucleus of a new Cambodian regime that would topple the Khmer Rouge and later establish the People's Republic of Kampuchea (PRK).

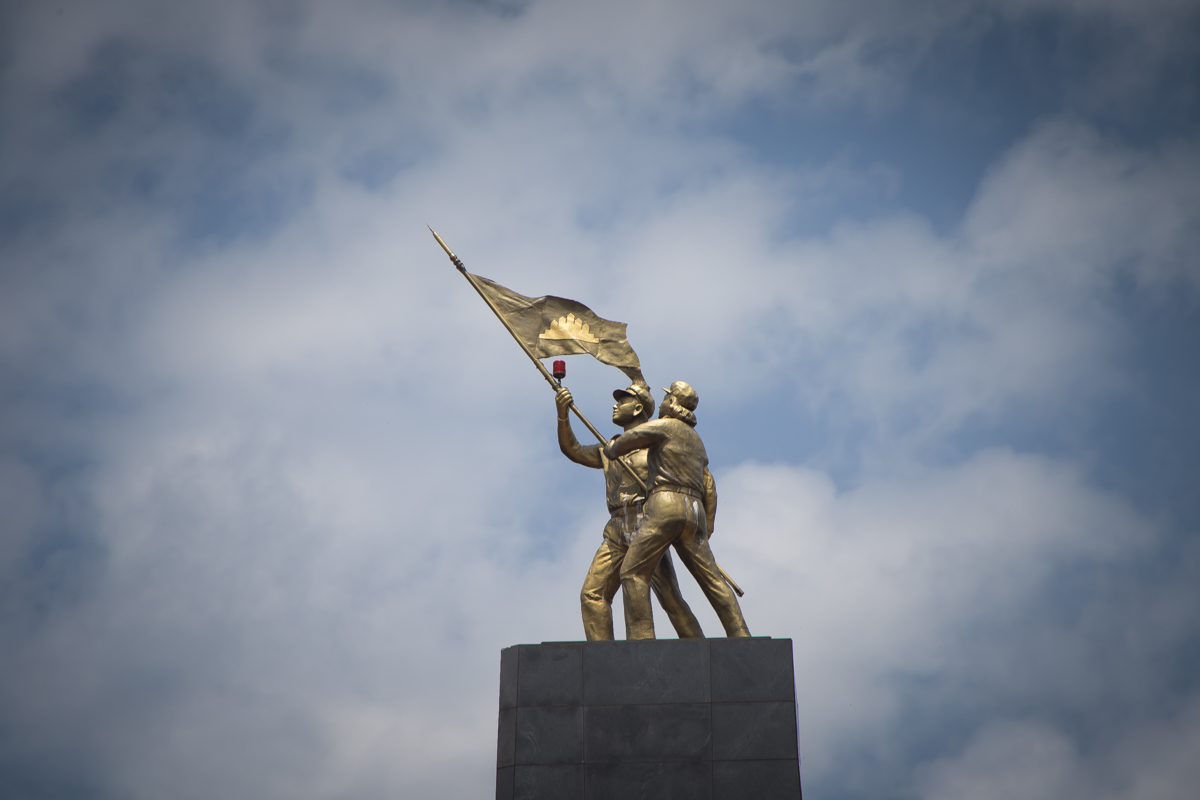
The December 2 Memorial Monument to commemorate the establishment of the Solidarity Front for the Development of the Cambodian Motherland (SFDCM).

== History ==
Its foundation took place on 2 December 1978 in Kratié Province near the border with Vietnam (now Cheung Khlu, Pir Thnu, Snuol district) at a meeting of seventy dissident Cambodians determined to overthrow Pol Pot's government. Heng Samrin was voted as leader of the front and within a few weeks its influence spread widely on both sides of the border. The front was a heterogeneous Cambodian politico-military organization that legitimized the Vietnamese invasion of Cambodia, precipitating the ensuing defeat of the Khmer Rouge's Democratic Kampuchea regime. It brought about the foundation of the new state named 'People's Republic of Kampuchea' and the reconstruction of the shattered and desperately impoverished country plagued by massacres. This organization has undergone various name changes as it has expanded and adapted to the different historical realities in Cambodia.

=== Kampuchean United Front for National Salvation (1978–1981) ===
Politically, the Salvation Front (FUNSK) was a pro-Hanoi umbrella organization of the Marxist Kampuchean People's Revolutionary Party (KPRP) opposed to the Communist Party of Kampuchea —also known as the Angkar. The original FUNSK group was formed within Cambodia in an area around Kratie that had been liberated from the Khmer Rouge by other Cambodian Communists and Khmer Rouge defectors. The latter didn't share Pol Pot's growing personality cult and his increasingly anti-Vietnamese policies. Many felt personally threatened by the bloody purges in Eastern Cambodia in 1977, especially after So Phim's murder at the hand of members of the pro-Pol Pot faction.

The date of the Salvation Front's foundation was 2 December 1978, in what Khmer socialist militants called a "Reunion Congress". The aim of the FUNSK was to expand as a Cambodian front in order to overthrow Pol Pot's regime of terror. The Salvation Front drew eleven points for the reconstruction of the country. These points would be used after the establishment of the PRK to motivate Cambodians to support the rebuilding efforts and the pro-Soviet structure of the new state to keep the revolution alive with a moderate, pragmatic and humane approach compared to the Khmer Rouge. Although the front was largely controlled by KPRP communists, it included quite a few non-communists in its leadership, such as Cambodian Buddhist religious figures, as well as women.

The Central Committee of FUNSK at its foundation was then made up of 15 individuals with Heng Samrin as chairman, Chea Sim as vice president, Ros Samay as secretary general. Revolutionary People's Council decreed on 8 January 1979: Heng Samrin (chairman), Vice Chairman: Pen Sovan. Headed by Heng Samrin, the Revolutionary People's Council of Kampuchea includes Hun Sen (Foreign Affairs), Keo Chenda (Culture and Information), Mot Sakun (Economy), Chea Sim (Interior), Pen Sovan (Defense), Nu Beng (Health and Social Affairs), and Chan Ven (Education).

=== Kampuchean United Front for National Construction and Defence (1981–2006) ===
In 1981, two years after the liberation of Phnom Penh, the Salvation Front was renamed "Kampuchean United Front for National Construction and Defence", Front d'union pour l'édification et la défense de la patrie du Cambodge (KUFNCD or UFCDK). Years after the establishment of the People's Republic of Kampuchea, the Front remained as the main political organization of the pro-Hanoi Cambodian state. The front's role in the political life of the nation was officially established in the PRK Constitution, which stated in Article 3 that "The Kampuchean Front for National Construction and the revolutionary mass organizations constitute a solid support base of the state, encouraging the people to fulfill their revolutionary tasks."

- Honorary Chairman: Heng Samrin
- Chairman: Chea Sim

=== Solidarity Front for Development of the Cambodian Motherland (2006–present) ===
On the 5th congress of the Kampuchean United Front for National Construction and Defence, held in Phnom Penh, on 29 April 2006, the name of the KUFNCD was changed to "Solidarity Front for Development of the Cambodian Motherland", Front de solidarité pour le développement de la Patrie du Cambodge (SFDCM).

== Tasks ==
The Front's specific missions were to transmit party policies to the masses, to act as an ombudsman, and to mobilize the people around the regime's efforts to consolidate the so-called "worker-peasant alliance". The front's cadres were required to stay in close touch with the people, to report their needs and problems to authorities, and to conduct mass campaigns to generate support for the regime, or to lead "emulation" drives to spur the population to greater efforts in pursuit of specific goals.

The cadres were also responsible for organizing networks of Salvation Front activists in villages and in communes and for coordinating their functions with cadres of various mass organizations. Often this involved long indoctrination sessions and getting villagers to paint banners and hoardings related to the Salvation Front propaganda. This created some resentment in the eyes of the people who perceived that the effort could have been directed towards more productive work.

The Front also was responsible for conducting "activities of friendship," which were aimed at improving the climate for close cooperation with "the Vietnamese people and the Vietnamese army and experts." Another major function of the front was to reeducate Buddhist monks so that they would "discard the narrow-minded views of dividing themselves into groups and factions" and would participate more actively in the revolutionary endeavors of the Salvation Front.

Presently the Solidarity Front for Development of the Cambodian Motherland (SFDCM), the Salvation Front's latest avatar, organizes national and international events, such as sports venues and trade fairs on behalf of the Cambodian government.

== Organizations ==
Among the more important mass organizations affiliated with the KUFNCD as an umbrella organization were the following:

- Kampuchean Federation of Trade Unions (KFTU). It had 62,000 members in December 1983 and was officially described as "the training school of the working class for economic and administrative management".
- Kampuchean People's Revolutionary Youth Union (KPRYU), an important reservoir of candidate members for the KPRP and "a school of Marxism" for people between the ages of fifteen and twenty-six. As of March 1987, when the Youth Union held its Second National Congress, there were more than 50,000 members in villages, factories, enterprises, hospitals, schools, public offices, and the armed forces.
- Kampuchean Revolutionary Youth Association (KRYA), an 800,000- member group for children (aged 9 to 16).
- Kampuchean Young Pioneers Organization (KYPO), a 450,000-member group for preschoolers under the general guidance of the KPRYU and the KRYA, both part of the Pioneer movement.
- Kampuchean Revolutionary Women's Association (KRWA), which claimed 923,000 members as of October 1983.

== Commemorative dates ==
All the organizations under the KUFNCD held rallies to arouse public awareness on national commemorative occasions such as the following:

- Kampuchea-Vietnam Solidarity Day on 18 February.
- Day of Remembrance observed on 20 May.
- Day of Solidarity between the People and the Army celebrated on 19 June.

== See also ==
- History of Cambodia
- Lê Đức Thọ
- Say Pouthang
- List of political parties in Cambodia
- National United Front of Kampuchea
- Patriotic and Democratic Front of the Great National Union of Kampuchea
- People's Republic of Kampuchea

== Bibliography ==
- Bekaert, Jacques, Cambodian Diary, Vol. 1: Tales of a Divided Nation 1983-1986, White Lotus Press, Bangkok 1997, ISBN 974-8496-95-3,
- Gottesman, Evan, Cambodia after the Khmer Rouge: Inside the politics of Nation Building.
- Vickery, Michael, Cambodia : 1975-1982, Boston: South End Press, 1984
