= Lê Đức Thọ =

Vietnamese revolutionary, diplomat, and politician (1911–1990)

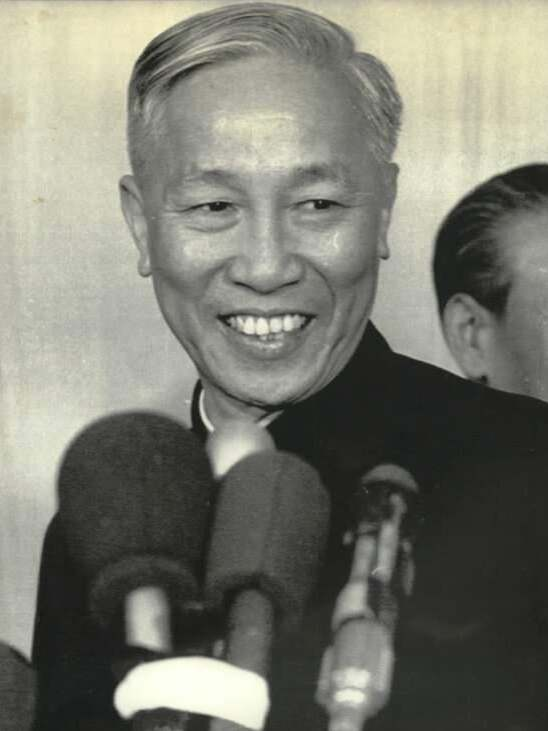
- Thọ in 1972

Advisor to the Party Central Committee
- In office 18 December 1986 – 13 October 1990 Serving with Trường Chinh, Phạm Văn Đồng, Nguyễn Văn Linh, Võ Chí Công

Head of the Central Organizing Commission
- In office 1976–1980
- Preceded by: Lê Văn Lương
- Succeeded by: Nguyễn Đức Tâm
- In office 1956–1973
- Preceded by: Lê Văn Lương
- Succeeded by: Lê Văn Lương

Standing Secretary of the Secretariat
- In office 30 April 1980 – 18 December 1986 Serving with Nguyễn Duy Trinh and Lê Thanh Nghị

Member of the Secretariat
- In office 1960–1986

Secretariat positions: 1983–1986: Secretary for Theoretical, Internal and Foreign Affairs; 1983–1986: Vice Chair of the National Defense Commission; 1980–1982: Chair of the Special Political Affairs Commission; 1976–1980: Chair of the Southern Affairs Commission

Member of the Politburo
- In office 1955–1986

Personal details
- Born: Phan Đình Khải; 14 October 1911 Nam Trực, Nam Định province, French Indochina (now Ninh Bình, Vietnam)
- Died: 13 October 1990 (aged 78) Hanoi, Vietnam
- Party: Communist Party of Vietnam (1945–1990); Indochinese Communist Party (1930–1945)
- Awards: Nobel Peace Prize (1973; declined)

Lê Đức Thọ (Vietnamese: [lē ɗɨ̌k tʰɔ̂ˀ]; 14 October 1911 – 13 October 1990), born Phan Đình Khải in Nam Dinh Province, was a Vietnamese revolutionary, diplomat, and politician. He was the first Asian to be awarded the Nobel Peace Prize, jointly with United States Secretary of State Henry Kissinger in 1973, but refused the award.

== Communist revolutionary ==
Lê Đức Thọ became active in Vietnamese nationalism as a teenager and spent much of his adolescence in French colonial prisons, an experience that hardened him. Thọ's nickname was "the Hammer" on account of his severity. In 1930, Thọ helped found the Indochinese Communist Party. French colonial authorities imprisoned him from 1930 to 1936 and again from 1939 to 1944. The French imprisoned him in one of the "tiger cage" cells on the prison located on the island of Poulo Condore (modern Côn Sơn Island) in the South China Sea, which was regarded as the harshest prison in all of French Indochina. During his time in the "tiger cage", Thọ suffered from hunger, heat, and humiliation. Together with other Vietnamese Communist prisoners, Thọ studied literature, science, and foreign languages, and acted in Molière's plays. Despite being imprisoned by the French, France was still regarded as the "land of culture", and the prisoners paid a "peculiar tribute" to French culture by putting on these plays.

After his release in 1945, Thọ helped lead the Viet Minh, the Vietnamese independence movement, against the French, until the Geneva Accords were signed in 1954. In 1948, he was in South Vietnam as Deputy Secretary, Head of the Organization Department of the Cochinchina Committee Party. In 1955 he joined the Politburo of the Lao Dong Party (Vietnam Workers' Party), now the Communist Party of Vietnam. Thọ oversaw the Communist insurgency that began in 1956 against the South Vietnamese government. In 1963, Thọ supported the purges of the party as a result of Resolution 9.

== Paris Peace Accords ==
The United States actively joined the Vietnam War during the early 1960s. Several rounds of Paris Peace Talks (some public, some secret) were held between 1968 and 1973. Xuân Thuỷ was the official head of the North Vietnamese delegation, but Thọ arrived in Paris in June 1968 to take effective control. On his way to Paris, Thọ stopped in Moscow to meet the Soviet Premier Aleksei Kosygin. On Thọ's behalf, Kosygin sent President Lyndon B. Johnson a letter reading: "My colleagues and I believe and have grounds to believe that an end to the bombing [of North Vietnam] would lead to a breakthrough in the peace talks". While Xuân Thuỷ led the official negotiating team representing the Democratic Republic of Vietnam at the talks in Paris, Thọ and U.S. National Security Advisor Henry Kissinger beginning in February 1970 engaged in secret conversations that eventually led to a cease-fire as part of the Paris Peace Accords of 27 January 1973.

=== 1968 ===
On 8 September 1968, Thọ first met W. Averell Harriman, the head of the American delegation, in a villa in the town of Vitry-sur-Seine. At the meeting, Harriman conceded that in "serious talks" the National Liberation Front (NLF) might take part in the talks provided that the South Vietnamese were also allowed to join. At another meeting with Harriman on 12 September, Thọ made the concession that South Vietnam could continue as an independent state provided the National Liberation Front could join the government, but demanded that the United States had to unconditionally cease bombing all of North Vietnam first. After the meeting, Harriman thanked Thọ for his "straight talk", but disputed a number of Thọ's claims, saying that the Vietnam war was not the most costly war in American history.

Thọ was unhappy when Hanoi demanded that the National Liberation Front take part in the peace talks as the lead negotiating team, instead of the North Vietnamese, which he knew would cause complications. He flew back to Hanoi in an attempt to change the instructions, in which he was successful, but was also told to tell Harriman that an expanded four-party talks involving the Americans, the South Vietnamese, the North Vietnamese and the NLF would begin "as early as possible" without settling a firm date. However, the four-party talks did not take place as planned, as South Vietnamese President Nguyễn Văn Thiệu decided to stall talks after receiving messages from Anna Chennault that the Republican presidential candidate Richard Nixon would be more supportive. On 18 January 1969, Thọ told Harriman that he regretted the latter's departure, saying: "If you had stopped bombing after two or three months of talks, the situation would have been different now".

=== 1969 ===
In February 1969, Kissinger asked the Soviet ambassador in Washington, Anatoly Dobrynin, to set up a meeting with Thọ in Paris. On 4 August 1969, Kissinger had a secret meeting at the house of Jean Sainteny, a former French colonial official who served in Vietnam and was sympathetic towards Vietnamese nationalism. However, Thọ did not appear as expected and instead Thuỷ represented the DRV.

=== 1970 ===
Thọ first met Kissinger in a secret meeting in a modest house in Paris on the night of 21 February 1970, marking the beginning of a test of wills that was to last three years. Kissinger was later to say of Thọ: "I don't look back on our meetings with any great joy, yet he was a person of substance and discipline who defended the position he represented with dedication". Thọ told Kissinger at their first meeting that "Vietnamization" was doomed, dismissively saying in French: "Previously, with over one million U.S. and Saigon troops, you have failed. Now how can you win if you let the South Vietnamese Army fight alone and if you only give them military support?". Kissinger saw that Thọ's beginning his activism working for Vietnamese independence at the age of 16 as proof that he was a "fanatic", and portrayed Thọ to Nixon as an unreasonable, uncompromising man, but one who was also well mannered, cultured, and polite. Kissinger found Thọ's air of superiority exasperating as Thọ took the viewpoint that North Vietnam was the real Vietnam, and regarded the Americans as "barbarians" who were merely trying to delay the inevitable by supporting South Vietnam. In April 1970, Thọ broke off his meetings with Kissinger, saying that there was nothing to discuss. An attempt by Kissinger to talk to Thọ again in May 1970 was rejected with a note reading "The U.S. words of peace are just empty ones".

=== 1971 ===
By May 1971, Thọ changed tactics in the talks, insisting that the main issue now was removing President Thiệu after the Americans departed. In July 1971, Kissinger taunted Thọ with the news that President Nixon would be visiting China soon to meet Mao Zedong, telling him that the days when the North Vietnamese could count of the supply of Chinese arms were coming to close. Thọ showed no emotion, saying: "That is your affair. Our fighting is our preoccupation, and that will decide the outcome for our country. What you have told us will have no influence on our fighting".

=== 1972 ===
On 30 March 1972, the North Vietnamese launched the Easter Offensive. It was initially successful and provoked a resumption of US bombing of North Vietnam in Operation Freedom Train, beginning on 6 April. Thọ sent a message in mid-April, saying the resumed bombing was "a very serious step of escalation, aimed at stopping the collapse of the situation in South Vietnam and putting pressure on us".

On 2 May 1972, Thọ had his 13th meeting with Kissinger in Paris. The meeting was hostile, as the North Vietnamese had just taken Quang Tri City in South Vietnam, which led Nixon to tell Kissinger "No nonsense. No niceness. No accommodations". During the meeting, Thọ mentioned that Senator William Fulbright was criticizing the Nixon administration, leading Kissinger to say: "Our domestic discussions are no concern of yours". Thọ snapped back: "I'm giving an example to prove that Americans share our views". When Kissinger asked Thọ why North Vietnam had not responded to a proposal he sent via the Soviet Union, Thọ replied: "We have on many occasions said that if you have any question, you should talk to directly to us, and we shall talk directly to you. We don't speak through a third person".

Thọ next met Kissinger on 19 July 1972. Kissinger tried to persuade Thọ that he had nothing to fear from the United States in the long term, and asked: "when we can live with governments that are not pro-American in the largest Asian nations, why should we insist on a government that is pro-American in Saigon?" Thọ stated that Kissinger was not offering anything new. By August 1972, Kissinger was promising Thọ that he would pressure Nguyễn Văn Thiệu to resign only if Thọ would agree to make a peace deal before the presidential elections of that year. Thọ told Kissinger that the timetable for Thiệu's departure was no longer an immediate concern, and instead he wanted some $8 billion in reparations for war damage. Kissinger also told Thọ that he wanted to tell the world about their secret meetings since 1970 in order to give the impression that Nixon was making progress on peace in Vietnam, a suggestion that Thọ rejected, saying it was not his job to assist Nixon's reelection campaign. On 15 September 1972, Kissinger told Thọ: "We wish to end before October 15-if sooner, all the better". Thọ told Hanoi that Kissinger wanted a peace agreement before the election and now was the best time to settle.

On 7 October 1972, Kissinger and Thọ agreed to a council of national reconciliation in Saigon that was to include the National Liberation Front and would preside over free elections. Kissinger told Thọ that he expected a peace agreement to be signed in Paris on 25 or 26 October 1972, saying that all that was needed now was the approval of Thiệu and Nixon. However, when Kissinger arrived in Saigon, Thiệu refused to sign the peace agreement. Nixon had initially agreed to the peace agreement, but, upon hearing of Thiệu's claims of betrayal, started to change his mind.

On 20 November 1972, Kissinger met Thọ again in Paris. Kissinger no longer aimed at secrecy and was followed by paparazzi as he went to a house owned by the French Communist Party where Thọ was waiting for him. Kissinger announced that the Americans wanted major changes to the peace agreement made in October to accommodate Thiệu, which led Thọ to accuse Kissinger of negotiating in bad faith. Thọ stated: "We have been deceived by the French, the Japanese and the Americans. But the deception has never been so flagrant as of now". Kissinger insisted that the changes he wanted were only minor, but in effect he wanted to renegotiate almost the entire agreement. Thọ rejected Kissinger's terms, saying he would abide by the terms agreed to on 8 October. Putting more pressure, Nixon told Kissinger to break off the talks if Thọ would not agree to the changes he wanted. Kissinger told Nixon: "While we have a moral case for bombing North Vietnam when it does not accept our terms, it seems to be really stretching the point to bomb North Vietnam when it has accepted our terms and when South Vietnam has not". By December 1972, the talks had broken down, and Nixon decided to resume bombing North Vietnam.

On 17 December 1972, the Christmas bombings began. On 26 December 1972, North Vietnam announced a willingness to resume peace talks in Paris again in January. Though Nixon had decided after all to accept peace terms very close to those of 8 October, the bombings allowed him to portray himself as having forced North Vietnam back to the table. The American historian A.J. Langguth wrote the Christmas bombings were "pointless", as the final peace agreement of 23 January 1973 was essentially the same as that of 8 October 1972, as Thọ refused to make any substantial concessions.

=== 1973 ===
After the Christmas bombings of 1972, Thọ was in a particularly savage mood towards Kissinger. The relationship between Kissinger and Thọ was antagonistic and condescending on the part of Thọ, angering Kissinger. After one meeting, Kissinger asked "Allow me to ask you one question: do you scold your colleagues in the Central Committee the way you scold us?"

At their meeting on 8 January 1973 in a house in the French town of Gif-sur-Yvette, Kissinger arrived to find nobody at the door to greet him. When Kissinger entered the conference room, nobody spoke to him. Sensing the hostile mood, Kissinger speaking in French said: "It was not my fault about the bombing". Before Kissinger could say any more, Thọ exploded in rage, saying in French: "Under the pretext of interrupted negotiations, you resumed the bombing of North Vietnam, just at the moment when I reached home. You have 'greeted' my arrival in a very courteous manner! Your action, I can say, is flagrant and gross! You and no one else strained the honor of the United States". Thọ shouted at Kissinger for over an hour, and despite Kissinger's requests not to speak so loudly because the reporters outside the room could hear what he was saying, he did not relent. Thọ concluded: "For more than ten years, America has used violence to beat down the Vietnamese people-napalm, B-52s. But you don't draw any lessons from your failures. You continue the same policy. Ngu xuẩn! Ngu xuẩn! Ngu xuẩn!" When Kissinger asked what ngu xuẩn meant in Vietnamese, the translator refused to translate, as ngu xuẩn (in Chữ Nôm: 愚蠢) roughly means that a person is grossly stupid.

When Kissinger was finally able to speak, he argued that it was Thọ, who by being unreasonable, had forced Nixon to order the Christmas bombings, a claim that led Thọ to snap in fury: "You've spent billions of dollars and many tons of bombs when we had a text ready to sign". Kissinger replied: "I have heard many adjectives in your comments. I propose that you should not use them". Thọ answered: "I have used those adjectives with a great deal of restraint already. The world opinion, the U.S. press and U.S. political personalities have used harsher words".

When the talks finally began, Kissinger put forward the demand that North Vietnam pull out all of its troops out of South Vietnam, a demand that Thọ rejected out of hand. The most important issue remaining was the demilitarized zone (DMZ). Tho accepted language that he had been rejecting a few weeks earlier, "North and South Vietnam shall respect the Demilitarized Zone on either side of the Provisional Military Demarcation Line," meaning that the DMZ was actually to be demilitarized—North Vietnamese troops had to stay out of it.

Thọ told Kissinger that if a peace agreement was signed, that within 15 days a peace agreement would be signed for Laos. But he stated, that unlike the Pathet Lao in Laos, North Vietnam had no influence over the Khmer Rouge in Cambodia. Kissinger did not believe Thọ's claims that the Khmer Rouge leader Pol Pot was a fanatical Khmer nationalist with a hatred of the Vietnamese. After the meeting, Kissinger told Thọ: "We must forget all that has happened. When we walk out, we must be smiling".

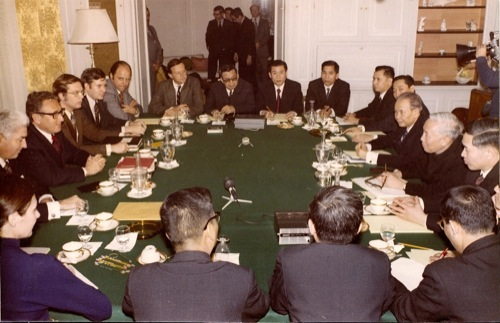
Henry Kissinger and Lê Đức Thọ initial the Vietnam peace agreement in the International Conference Center in Paris, January 23, 1973.

On the night of 9 January 1973, Kissinger phoned Nixon in Washington to say that a peace agreement would be signed very soon. On 10 January 1973, the negotiations broke down when Kissinger demanded the release of all American POWs in North Vietnam once a peace agreement was signed, but offered no guarantees about Viet Cong prisoners being held in South Vietnam. Thọ stated: "I cannot accept your proposal. I completely reject it". Thọ wanted the release of all prisoners once a peace agreement was signed, which led Kissinger to say this was an unreasonable demand. Thọ, who had been tortured as a young man by the French colonial police for advocating Vietnamese independence, shouted: "You have never been a prisoner. You don't understand suffering. It's unfair". Kissinger finally offered that the United States would use "maximum influence" to pressure the South Vietnamese government to release all Viet Cong prisoners within sixty days of a peace agreement being signed. On 23 January 1973, at 12:45 pm, Kissinger and Thọ signed the peace agreement.

The basic facts of the Accords included:

- release of POWs within 80 days;
- ceasefire to be monitored by the International Commission of Control and Supervision (ICCS);
- free and democratic elections to be held in South Vietnam;
- U.S. aid to South Vietnam would continue;
- North Vietnamese troops could remain in South Vietnam.

On 28 March 1973, the last of the American forces left South Vietnam. While 23 January is generally recognized as the enactment date of the Peace Accords, the talks continued out of necessity. Sporadic fighting continued in some regions, while U.S. ground forces were being removed. Due to continued ceasefire violations by all sides, Kissinger and Thọ met in Paris in May and June 1973 for the purpose of getting the implementation of the peace agreement back on track. On 13 June 1973, the United States and North Vietnam signed a joint communique pledging mutual support for full implementation of the Paris Accords.

=== Nobel Peace Prize ===
Thọ and Henry Kissinger were jointly awarded the 1973 Nobel Peace Prize for their efforts in negotiating the Paris Peace Accords. However, Thọ declined to accept the award, claiming that peace had not yet been established, and that the United States and the South Vietnamese governments were in violation of the Paris Peace Accords:

However, since the signing of the Paris agreement, the United States and the Saigon administration continue in grave violation of a number of key clauses of this agreement. The Saigon administration, aided and encouraged by the United States, continues its acts of war. Peace has not yet really been established in South Vietnam. In these circumstances it is impossible for me to accept the 1973 Nobel Prize for Peace which the committee has bestowed on me. Once the Paris accord on Vietnam is respected, the arms are silenced and a real peace is established in South Vietnam, I will be able to consider accepting this prize. With my thanks to the Nobel Prize Committee please accept, madame, my sincere respects.

In an interview by the UPI, Thọ also explained for his decision:

Unfortunately, the Nobel Peace Prize Committee put the aggressor and the victim of aggression on the same par. ... That was a blunder. The Nobel Peace Prize is one of the greatest prizes in the world. But the United States conducted a war of aggression against Vietnam. It is we, the Vietnamese people, who made peace by defeating the American war of aggression against us, by regaining our independence and freedom.

In a 1974 interview with AP news nearly a year after the signing of the Paris Peace Accords, Le Duc Tho said the Paris Peace Accords had been a historic achievement for Vietnam and a major defeat of American imperialism, stating that it "was a victory of historical and epoch making significance for the Vietnamese people, who fought for 18 years with utmost perseverance and courage. It was also a victory for peace loving and justice seeking people around the world." In the same interview, he accused the United States and South Vietnam of violating the Paris Peace Accords. He claimed that the US was providing war materials, supporting South Vietnamese military operations, continuing aerial bombing and using American military personnel disguised as civilians. He also claimed that the South Vietnamese were engaging in police terror and revenge in areas captured. He claimed that the "Saigon regime served as an instrument for implementing neocolonialism in South Vietnam; this was a primary cause of the situation in the South."

== Winning the war ==
In January 1974, Thọ told General Hoàng Văn Thái that he could not leave to take up a command in South Vietnam as he had expected, saying that the Politburo had assigned him another, more important task. General Thai had thought Thọ should win glory on the battlefield, but Thọ was unyielding, saying that turning the Ho Chi Minh Trail into a highway was more important. Using bulldozers from the Soviet Union and China, over the course of 1974, General Thai transformed the Ho Chi Minh Trail into a paved, four lane highway that ran 1,200 kilometres (750 mi) from North Vietnam through Laos and Cambodia into South Vietnam. He also laid down a 3,000-mile (4,800 km) pipeline to carry oil. The paving of the Ho Chi Minh Trail allowed North Vietnam to not only send more troops to South Vietnam, but to keep them well supplied.

In December 1974, the North Vietnamese launched an offensive in the Central Highlands of South Vietnam that proved more successful than expected, and on 6 January 1975 took the provincial capital of Phước Long. Le Duan, the secretary-general of the Vietnamese Workers' Party, decided to follow up this victory with an offensive to seize all of the Central Highlands and sent Thọ to monitor operations. Following the Communist victory at the Battle of Ban Me Thuot, which ended on 11 March 1975, Thọ approved the plans of the North Vietnamese commander, General Van Tien Dung, to take Pleiku and push further south. Thọ also reported to Hanoi that the South Vietnamese Army were suffering from low morale and were fighting poorly, which led him to suggest that all of South Vietnam might be taken that year, instead of in 1976 as originally planned. The name of the campaign to take Saigon would be the Ho Chi Minh campaign. The principal problem for the North Vietnamese was that operations had to be completed before the monsoons arrived in June, giving them a very short period of two months to win the war in 1975. Thọ sent Le Duan a poem that began "You warned: Go out and come back in victory...The time of opportunity has arrived". By April 1975, the North Vietnamese had advanced within striking distance of Saigon with what would prove to be the last major battle of the Vietnam war taking place at Phan Rang between 13 and 16 April 1975.

On 22 April 1975, General Dung showed Thọ his plan to take Saigon, which the latter approved, saying as he signed off on Dung's plan that this was the death sentence for the regime of "reactionary traitors" in Saigon. On 30 April 1975, the North Vietnamese took Saigon and Thọ entered the city in triumph. He immediately set about giving orders to ensure that the water works and electricity grid of Saigon was still functioning; that food would continue to arrive from the countryside; to make arrangements to deal with the one million soldiers of the South Vietnamese Army that he ordered dissolved; and appointing administrators to replace the South Vietnamese officials. On behalf of the Politburo he gave General Dung a telegram from Hanoi that simply read: "Political Bureau is most happy". On 1 May 1975, a parade was held in Saigon to celebrate both May Day and the victory, with Thọ watching the victorious soldiers march down the streets of Saigon, which was soon renamed Ho Chi Minh City.

== Role in Vietnamese government ==
Lê Đức Thọ had been involved in the resistance movement since before WW2 but specifics of his involvement have not always been clear. Certain details can be confirmed though. After being released from a French colonial prison he took on a role in the resistance movement as a communist propaganda official. In 1945 Lê Đức Thọ was elected to Central Committee and standing committee of the Communist Party of Vietnam. In 1948 he was sent to South Vietnam to help build the communist movement there and eventually became the leader of the Communist Party's organization in the South. Lê Đức Thọ returned to Hanoi in 1955 and was welcomed back into the Politburo and took control of the Party Control Commission in 1956. Through this position, he controlled all assigned positions in the party bureaucracy. He ultimately had the power to decide who got what position and where they worked. This position granted him significant reach and power within the party and he began to exert his influence Vietnam's politics and build up his position getting elected to the secretariat of the Central Committee in 1960.

Lê Đức Thọ was heavily involved in the war with South Vietnam and America being named the chairman for the supervision of the South according to North Vietnamese documents in 1967. He pushed a policy of escalating the war effort to achieve unification with South Vietnam and forcing America's hand in line with resolution 9. He was a strategist involved in planning the Tet Offensive with the aim to instigate an insurrection South Vietnam. He was involved in significant party purges, most notably the Anti-Party Affair where more moderate and Soviet aligned figures were arrested in an alleged conspiracy of opposing the policy of reunification. After ousting rivals, Lê Đức Thọ and Truong Chinh aligned Vietnam's foreign policy more with China's and up until the split with China in 1978. He was eventually lost certain positions in the government after being ousted by reformers in 1978 but retained a large amount of influence and was an advisor to the Communist Party's Central Committee until his death.

=== The Anti-Party Affair ===
Starting in 1967, high tensions in the communist sphere had major consequences in North Vietnam. The Sino-Soviet split and the height of the Chinese Cultural Revolution forced the political body of Vietnam to decide how to align and what they would do next. This culminated in what became known as the Anti-Party Affair in Vietnam with Lê Đức Thọ aligning himself against the alleged conspirators.

Lê Đức Thọ was put on the committee established to investigate the Anti-Party Affair. The accusations made were that conspirators opposed Resolution 9 (a measure to escalate the war with South Vietnam) in 1963, opposing armed resistance against the Americans and South Vietnam along with unification, and even correspondence with members of a foreign government. Mao Zedong had been making allegations of a Soviet peace plot in Vietnam from 1965-1968 to the Vietnamese government. The validity of the allegations have been called into a suspicion with some arrested alleging that Lê Đức Thọ and party member Le Duan viewed those arrested as threats to their position and concocted the coup plot to quell any threats. A subsequent purge of pro-Soviet members of the government followed with "Around 30 high-level figures were arrested, and perhaps as many as 300 altogether, including generals, theoreticians, professors, writers and television journalists trained in Moscow."

One of those arrested Vu Thu Hien alleged that Lê Đức Thọ targeted militants imprisoned with him in Son La during World War 2. Lê Đức Thọ was purported to be a servant for the prisoner governor as a favor to his family. Such a story would have been damaging to Lê Đức Thọ as the party's rhetoric against the petty bourgeois was high at the time and Lê Đức Thọ's position would have been in jeopardy.

=== Cambodia ===
From 1978 to 1982, Hanoi named Thọ to act as chief advisor to the Kampuchean United Front for National Salvation (FUNSK) and later to the nascent People's Republic of Kampuchea. Thọ's mission was to ensure that Khmer nationalism would not override Vietnam's interests in Cambodia after the Khmer Rouge was overthrown.

In 1979, the politburo assigned Lê Đức Thọ to run the nation building effort in Cambodia. He personally emphasized to experts to “refrain from big-country chauvinism." The Vietnamese government wanted to instill a sense of Proletarian unity to help smooth tensions and help Cambodia transition into a stable state. The effort had mixed results with some Vietnamese involved in the effort beginning to treat the Cambodians as inferior and a number of Cambodians viewing the Vietnamese as occupiers. A portion of Cambodians also defended Pol Pot's policies and blamed the failures on incompetent and/or cruel officials. There were efforts by both sides to alleviate tensions but cases of violence eventually broke out. A number of Cambodians joined resistance groups and Vietnamese soldiers in the Siem Reap region carried out a brutal purge of Cambodian officials and soldiers. Hanoi attempted to alleviate the situation but the nation building operation was quickly turning into a occupation struggling with partisans and general discontent.

=== Later life ===
Lê Đức Thọ served as Permanent Member of the Party Central Committee's Secretariat from 1982 to 1986, and later as an advisor to the Party's Central Committee from 1986 until he died in 1990.

== Death ==
Lê Đức Thọ died on 13 October 1990, the evening before his 79th birthday, having reportedly suffered from cancer, in Hanoi.
