= List of political parties in Cambodia =

This article lists political parties in Cambodia. Cambodia is a one-party dominant state with the Cambodian People's Party in power, while minor parties are allowed to operate as stated in the constitution.

== Active parties ==
=== Parties currently represented in national or local government ===
Party	Ideology	Position	Est.	Parliament		Communal		Leader
Party	Ideology	Position	Est.	Senate	Assembly	Chiefs	Councillors	Leader
Cambodian People's Party (CPP) គណបក្សប្រជាជនកម្ពុជា	Conservatism; National conservatism; Social market economy	Big tent	1951	55 / 62	120 / 125	1,648 / 1,652	9,376 / 11,622	Hun Sen
FUNCINPEC ហ្វ៊ុនស៊ិនប៉ិច	Conservatism; Economic liberalism; Royalism	Centre-right	1981	0 / 62	5 / 125	0 / 1,652	19 / 11,622	Norodom Chakravuth
Candlelight Party គណបក្សភ្លើងទៀន	Liberalism; Liberal democracy	Centre to centre-left	1995	0 / 62	0 / 125	4 / 1,652	2,198 / 11,622	Teav Vannol
Khmer Will Party គណបក្សឆន្ទៈខ្មែរ	Liberalism; Populism	Centre to centre-left	2018	3 / 62	0 / 125	0 / 1,652	0 / 11,622	Kong Monika
Khmer National United Party (KNUP) គណបក្សខ្មែររួបរួមជាតិ	Liberal conservatism; Social liberalism; Royalism	Centre-right	2016	0 / 62	0 / 125	0 / 1,652	13 / 11,622	Nhek Bun Chhay
Grassroots Democratic Party គណបក្សប្រជាធិបតេយ្យមូលដ្ឋាន	Grassroots democracy; Social democracy; Social liberalism	Centre-left	2015	0 / 62	0 / 125	0 / 1,652	6 / 11,622	Yeng Virak
Cambodia National Love Party គណបក្សខ្មែរស្រឡាញ់ជាតិ			2020	0 / 62	0 / 125	0 / 1,652	5 / 11,622	Khoeuy Sinoeun
Cambodian Youth Party (CYP) គណបក្សយុវជនកម្ពុជា	Populism		2015	0 / 62	0 / 125	0 / 1,652	3 / 11,622	Pich Sros
Kampucheaniyum Party គណបក្សកម្ពុជានិយម	Liberalism; Liberal democracy; Nationalism	Centre to centre-left	2021	0 / 62	0 / 125	0 / 1,652	1 / 11,622	Yem Ponhearith
Beehive Social Democratic Party (BSDP) គណបក្សសំបុកឃ្មុំសង្គមប្រជាធិបតេយ្យ	Social democracy	Centre-left	2015	0 / 62	0 / 125	0 / 1,652	1 / 11,622	Mam Sonando

=== Minor parties ===
Party	Year founded	Leader	Notes
Cambodian Indigenous People's Democracy Party គណបក្សជនជាតិដើមប្រជាធិបតេយ្យកម្ពុជា	2015	Blang Sin	
Cambodian Liberty Party គណបក្សសេរីភាពកម្ពុជា	2015	Sisowath Chakrey Noukpol	
Cambodian Nationality Party គណបក្សសញ្ជាតិកម្ពុជា			
Cambodian Reform Party គណបក្សកំណែទម្រង់កម្ពុជា	2021	Pol Ham	
Democratic Republic Party គណបក្សសាធារណរដ្ឋប្រជាធិបតេយ្យ	2012	Sovan Panhchakseila	
Ekapheap Cheat Khmer Party គណបក្សឯកភាពជាតិខ្មែរ			
Khmer Anti-Poverty Party គណបក្សខ្មែរឈប់ក្រ	2007	Daran Kravanh	In the United States
Khmer Conservative Party គណបក្សខ្មែរអភិរក្ស	2019	Riel Khemarin	
Khmer Economic Development Party គណបក្សអភិវឌ្ឍសេដ្ឋកិច្ចខ្មែរ			
Khmer National Party គណបក្សជាតិនៃកម្ពុជា	2004	Sum Sitha	
Khmer Power Party គណបក្សអំណាចខ្មែរ	2010	Soung Sophorn	
Khmer Republican Party គណបក្សខ្មែរសាធារណរដ្ឋ	2006	Lon Rith	In the United States
Khmer Solidarity Party គណបក្សសាមគ្គីភាពខ្មែរ	2015	Lak Sopheap	
Khmer United Party គណបក្សរួបរួមខ្មែរ			
League for Democracy Party គណបក្សសម្ព័ន្ធដើម្បីប្រជាធិបតេយ្យ	2006	Khem Veasna	
Reaksmey Khemara Party គណបក្សរស្មីខេមរា			
Society of Justice Party គណបក្សសង្គមយុត្តិធម៌	2006	Ban Sophal	
United People of Cambodia គណបក្សសង្គមខ្មែរនិយម	2003	Oeurn Sarath	
New Generation Party គណបក្សជំនាន់ថ្មី	2024	Meach Sovannara	
Nation Power Party គណបក្សកម្លាំងជាតិ	2023	Sun Chanthy	
Democratic Progressive Party^{[km]} គណបក្សប្រជាធិបតេយ្យជឿនលឿន	2025^{[1]}	Yem Ponhearith	Founded in 2021 as Kampucheaniyum Party; Rebranded as the Democratic Progressive Party in September 2025

== Historical parties ==
Party	Leader	Created	Dissolved	Notes
Kampuchean People's Revolutionary Party បក្សប្រជាជនបដិវត្តន៍កម្ពុជា។	Heng Samrin	1979	1991	Succeeded by the Cambodian People's Party
Buddhist Liberal Democratic Party គណបក្សប្រជាធិបតេយ្យសេរីនិយមព្រះពុទ្ធសាសនា	Son Sann	1993	1997	
Cambodian National Unity Party គណបក្សសាមគ្គីជាតិកម្ពុជា	Khieu Samphan and Son Sen	1992	1997	
Communist Party of Kampuchea បក្សកុម្មុយនីស្តកម្ពុជា	Pol Pot	1951	1982	Ruling party from 1976 to 1982.
Democratic Party គណបក្សប្រជាធិបតេយ្យ	Norodom Phurissara	1946	1957	Ruling party from 1946 to 1955.
Democratic National Union Movement ចលនាសហភាពជាតិប្រជាធិបតេយ្យ	Ieng Sary	1996	1998	
Khmer National Solidarity Party ចលនាសហភាពជាតិប្រជាធិបតេតយ្យ	Khieu Samphan	1997	1998	
Khmer People's National Liberation Front រណសិរ្សរំដោះជាតិប្រជាជនខ្មែរ	Son Sann	1979	1993	Succeeded by the Buddhist Liberal Democratic Party.
Khmer Renovation Party គណបក្សកំណែទម្រង់ខ្មែរ	Sisowath Monipong	1947	1955	Merged with Sangkum Reastr Niyum.
Khmer Serei ខ្មែរសេរី	Son Ngoc Thanh	1957	1976	Merged into the Khmer People's National Liberation Front.
Liberal Party គណបក្សសេរី	Norodom Norindeth	1946	1955	Merged with Sangkum Reastr Niyum.
Liberal Democratic Party គណបក្សប្រជាធិបតេយ្យសេរី	Sak Sutsakhan	1992	1998	
MOULINAKA ម៉ូលីណាកា	Prum Neakareach	1979	1998	
Party of Democratic Kampuchea គណបក្សកម្ពុជាប្រជាធិបតេយ្យ	Pol Pot	1981	1993	Succeeded by the Cambodian National Unity Party.
Pracheachon ក្រុមប្រជាជន	Keo Meas, Non Suon, and Penn Yuth	1954	1972	
Progressive Democrats គណបក្សប្រជាធិបតេយ្យរីកចម្រើន	Norodom Montana	1947	1955	Merged with Sangkum Reastr Niyum.
Republican Party គណបក្សសាធារណរដ្ឋ	Sisowath Sirik Matak	1972	1975	
Sangkum Reastr Niyum សង្គមរាស្ត្រនិយម	Norodom Sihanouk	1955	1970	Ruling party from 1955 to 1970.
Social Republican Party គណបក្សសាធារណរដ្ឋសង្គម	Lon Nol	1972	1975	Ruling party from 1972 to 1975.
United Issarak Front ខ្មែរឥស្សរៈ	Son Ngoc Minh	1950	1954	

== Defunct parties ==
Name	Leader	Created	Dissolved	Notes
Alliance of the National Community រណសិរ្សសង្គមជាតិនិយម	Khieu Rada	1997		
Cambodian Democratic Society Party គណបក្សសង្គមប្រជាធិបតេយ្យកម្ពុជា	Thorng Sovannara	2008	2021	Dissolved for Inactivity
Cambodian National Rescue Party គណបក្សសង្រ្គោះជាតិ	Kem Sokha	2012	2017	On November 16, 2017, the Supreme Court of Cambodia ruled to dissolve the CNRP
Cambodian National Sustaining Party គណបក្សទ្រទ្រង់ជាតិកម្ពុជា	Pen Sovann	1998		
Community of Royalist People's Party គណបក្សសង្គមរាស្ត្ររាជាធិបតេយ្យ	Norodom Ranariddh	2014	2015	In January 2015, the CRPP merged into FUNCINPEC.
Human Rights Party គណបក្សសិទ្ធិមនុស្ស	Kem Sokha	2007	2012	Merged to form Cambodia National Rescue Party
Khmer Improvement Party គណបក្សចំរើននិយមខ្មែរ	Lev An	1997		
Khmer Democratic Party គណបក្សប្រជាធិបតេយ្យខ្មែរ	Uk Phourik	1998	2021	Dissolved for Inactivity
Khmer Loves Khmer Party គណបក្សខ្មែរស្រឡាញ់ខ្មែរ	Hienh Theo	2008		
Khmer Front Party គណបក្សរណសិរ្សជនជាតិខ្មែរ	Suth Dina	2003		
Khmer Neutral Party គណបក្សអព្យាក្រឹតខ្មែរ	Bou Hel Ty Chhin	1993		
Nationalist Party គណបក្សជាតិនិយម	Norodom Ranariddh	2006	2014	Merged to form Cambodia National Rescue Party
Sam Rainsy Party គណបក្ស សម រង្ស៊ី	Sam Rainsy	1995	2012	Merged to form Cambodia National Rescue Party
Union of Cambodian Democrats សហភាពប្រជាធិបតេយ្យកម្ពុជា	Sam Rainsy; Norodom Ranariddh; Son Soubert	1997		
Hang Dara Democratic Movement Party គណបក្សចលនាប្រជាធិបតេយ្យហង្សដារ៉ា	Hang Dara	2002	2008	

== See also ==
- Elections in Cambodia
- Lists of political parties
