= List of political parties by region =

This page serves as a directory to lists of political parties worldwide, organized by their respective regions. Each linked page contains a table listing sub-pages for countries or jurisdictions within the specified region. The tables provide information on the dominant party system in each country.

A political party is an organized group that adheres to a specific ideology or revolves around particular issues, aiming to participate in political power, often through elections involvement. Individual parties are appropriately detailed in separate articles dedicated to each nation.

== List by regions and sub-regions ==
=== Americas ===
- List of political parties in the Caribbean by country
- List of political parties in Central America by country
- List of political parties in North America by country
- List of political parties in South America by country

=== Asia ===
- List of political parties in Central Asia by country
- List of political parties in Eastern Asia by country
- List of political parties in Southern Asia by country
- List of political parties in Southeast Asia by country
- List of political parties in Western Asia by country

=== Europe ===
- List of political parties in Eastern Europe
- List of political parties in Northern Europe
- List of political parties in Southern Europe
- List of political parties in Western Europe

=== Oceania ===
- List of political parties in Australia
- List of political parties in Melanesia by country
- List of political parties in Micronesia by country
- List of political parties in New Zealand
- List of political parties in Polynesia by country

== See also ==
- Lists of political parties
- List of basic political science topics
- List of democracy and elections-related topics
- List of frivolous parties
- List of election results
- List of national leaders
