= Lists of political parties =

Lists of political parties include:

== General ==
- List of agrarian parties
- List of animal advocacy parties
- List of Arab nationalist parties
- List of banned political parties
- List of centrist political parties
- List of Christian democratic parties
- List of communist parties
- List of communitarian political parties
- List of democratic socialist parties and organizations
- List of European federalist political parties
- List of Eurosceptic political parties
- List of fictional political parties
- List of frivolous political parties
- List of generic names of political parties
- List of green political parties
- List of Hindu nationalist political parties
- List of humanist political parties
- List of Islamic political parties
- List of Labour parties
- List of largest political parties
- List of left-conservative political parties
- List of left-wing political parties
- List of major liberal parties considered left
- List of major liberal parties considered right
- List of libertarian political parties
- List of monarchist parties
- List of political parties by region
- List of pro-European political parties
- List of pro-Russian political parties
- List of right-wing political parties
- List of ruling political parties by country
- List of social conservative political parties
- List of social democratic parties
- List of syncretic political parties
- List of Trotskyist organizations by country
- Political lists § Political parties by country

== By country ==
- List of ruling political parties by country
- List of political parties in Abkhazia
- List of political parties in Afghanistan
- List of political parties in Africa
- List of political parties in Albania
- List of political parties in Algeria
- List of political parties in American Samoa
- List of political parties in Andorra
- List of political parties in Angola
- List of political parties in Anguilla
- List of political parties in Antigua and Barbuda
- List of political parties in Argentina
- List of political parties in Armenia
- List of political parties in Aruba
- List of political parties in Asia
- List of political parties in Australia
- List of political parties in Austria
- List of political parties in Azerbaijan
- List of political parties in Bahrain
- List of political parties in Bangladesh
- List of political parties in Barbados
- List of political parties in Belarus
- List of political parties in Belgium
- List of political parties in Belize
- List of political parties in Benin
- List of political parties in Bermuda
- List of political parties in Bhutan
- List of political parties in Bolivia
- List of political parties in Bosnia and Herzegovina
- List of political parties in Botswana
- List of political parties in Brazil
- List of political parties in Brunei
- List of political parties in Bulgaria
- List of political parties in Burkina Faso
- List of political parties in Burma
- List of political parties in Burundi
- List of political parties in Cambodia
- List of political parties in Cameroon
- List of political parties in Canada
- List of political parties in Cape Verde
- List of political parties in Ceuta
- List of political parties in Chad
- List of political parties in Chile
- List of political parties in China
- List of political parties in Christmas Island
- List of political parties in Colombia
- List of political parties in Comoros
- List of political parties in Costa Rica
- List of political parties in Crimea
- List of political parties in Croatia
- List of political parties in Cuba
- List of political parties in Cyprus
- List of political parties in Côte d'Ivoire
- List of political parties in Denmark
- List of political parties in Djibouti
- List of political parties in Dominica
- List of political parties in East Timor
- List of political parties in Ecuador
- List of political parties in Egypt
- List of political parties in El Salvador
- List of political parties in Equatorial Guinea
- List of political parties in Eritrea
- List of political parties in Estonia
- List of political parties in Eswatini
- List of political parties in Ethiopia
- List of political parties in Europe
- List of political parties in Fiji
- List of political parties in Finland
- List of political parties in France
- List of political parties in French Guiana
- List of political parties in French Polynesia
- List of political parties in Gabon
- List of political parties in Georgia (country)
- List of political parties in Germany
- List of political parties in Ghana
- List of political parties in Gibraltar
- List of political parties in Greece
- List of political parties in Greenland
- List of political parties in Grenada
- List of political parties in Guadeloupe
- List of political parties in Guam
- List of political parties in Guatemala
- List of political parties in Guernsey
- List of political parties in Guinea
- List of political parties in Guinea-Bissau
- List of political parties in Guyana
- List of political parties in Haiti
- List of political parties in Honduras
- List of political parties in Hong Kong
- List of political parties in Hungary
- List of political parties in Iceland
- List of political parties in India
- List of political parties in Indonesia
- List of political parties in Iran
- List of political parties in Iraq
- List of political parties in Ireland
- List of political parties in Israel
- List of political parties in Italy
- List of political parties in Jamaica
- List of political parties in Japan
- List of political parties in Jersey
- List of political parties in Jordan
- List of political parties in Kazakhstan
- List of political parties in Kenya
- List of political parties in Kiribati
- List of political parties in Kosovo
- List of political parties in Kuwait
- List of political parties in Kyrgyzstan
- List of political parties in Laos
- List of political parties in Latvia
- List of political parties in Lebanon
- List of political parties in Lesotho
- List of political parties in Liberia
- List of political parties in Libya
- List of political parties in Liechtenstein
- List of political parties in Lithuania
- List of political parties in Luxembourg
- List of political parties in Macau
- List of political parties in Madagascar
- List of political parties in Malawi
- List of political parties in Malaysia
- List of political parties in Mali
- List of political parties in Malta
- List of political parties in Martinique
- List of political parties in Mauritania
- List of political parties in Mauritius
- List of political parties in Mayotte
- List of political parties in Melilla
- List of political parties in Mexico
- List of political parties in Moldova
- List of political parties in Monaco
- List of political parties in Mongolia
- List of political parties in Montenegro
- List of political parties in Montserrat
- List of political parties in Morocco
- List of political parties in Mozambique
- List of political parties in Artsakh
- List of political parties in Namibia
- List of political parties in Nauru
- List of political parties in Nepal
- List of political parties in New Caledonia
- List of political parties in New Zealand
- List of political parties in Nicaragua
- List of political parties in Niger
- List of political parties in Nigeria
- List of political parties in Niue
- List of political parties in Norfolk Island
- List of political parties in North America
- List of political parties in North Korea
- List of political parties in Northern Ireland
- List of political parties in Norway
- List of political parties in Oceania
- List of political parties in Oman
- List of political parties in Pakistan
- List of political parties in Palau
- List of political parties in Panama
- List of political parties in Papua New Guinea
- List of political parties in Paraguay
- List of political parties in Peru
- List of political parties in Poland
- List of political parties in Portugal
- List of political parties in Puerto Rico
- List of political parties in Puntland
- List of political parties in Qatar
- List of political parties in Romania
- List of political parties in Russia
- List of political parties in Rwanda
- List of political parties in Réunion
- List of political parties in Saint Barthélemy
- List of political parties in Saint Helena
- List of political parties in Saint Kitts and Nevis
- List of political parties in Saint Lucia
- List of political parties in Saint Martin (France)
- List of political parties in Saint Pierre and Miquelon
- List of political parties in Saint Vincent and the Grenadines
- List of political parties in Samoa
- List of political parties in San Marino
- List of political parties in Saudi Arabia
- List of political parties in Scotland
- List of political parties in Senegal
- List of political parties in Serbia
- List of political parties in Seychelles
- List of political parties in Sierra Leone
- List of political parties in Singapore
- List of political parties in Slovakia
- List of political parties in Slovenia
- List of political parties in Somalia
- List of political parties in Somaliland
- List of political parties in South Africa
- List of political parties in South America
- List of political parties in South Korea
- List of political parties in South Ossetia
- List of political parties in South Sudan
- List of political parties in Spain
- List of political parties in Sri Lanka
- List of political parties in Sudan
- List of political parties in Suriname
- List of political parties in Svalbard
- List of political parties in Sweden
- List of political parties in Switzerland
- List of political parties in Syria
- List of political parties in São Tomé and Príncipe
- List of political parties in Taiwan
- List of political parties in Tajikistan
- List of political parties in Tanzania
- List of political parties in Thailand
- List of political parties in Togo
- List of political parties in Tokelau
- List of political parties in Tonga
- List of political parties in Transnistria
- List of political parties in Trinidad and Tobago
- List of political parties in Tunisia
- List of political parties in Turkey
- List of political parties in Turkmenistan
- List of political parties in Tuvalu
- List of political parties in Uganda
- List of political parties in Ukraine
- List of political parties in Uruguay
- List of political parties in Uzbekistan
- List of political parties in Vanuatu
- List of political parties in Venezuela
- List of political parties in Vietnam
- List of political parties in Wales
- List of political parties in Wallis and Futuna
- List of political parties in Western Sahara
- List of political parties in Yemen
- List of political parties in Zambia
- List of political parties in Zimbabwe
- List of political parties in the Bahamas
- List of political parties in the British Virgin Islands
- List of political parties in the Canary Islands
- List of political parties in the Cayman Islands
- List of political parties in the Central African Republic
- List of political parties in the Cocos (Keeling) Islands
- List of political parties in the Cook Islands
- List of political parties in the Czech Republic
- List of political parties in the Democratic Republic of the Congo
- List of political parties in the Dominican Republic
- List of political parties in the Falkland Islands
- List of political parties in the Faroe Islands
- List of political parties in the Federated States of Micronesia
- List of political parties in the Gambia
- List of political parties in the Isle of Man
- List of political parties in the Maldives
- List of political parties in the Marshall Islands
- List of political parties in the Netherlands
- List of political parties in the Netherlands Antilles
- List of political parties in the Northern Mariana Islands
- List of political parties in the People's Republic of China
- List of political parties in the Philippines
- List of political parties in the Pitcairn Islands
- List of political parties in the Republic of Macedonia
- List of political parties in the Republic of the Congo
- List of political parties in the Solomon Islands
- List of political parties in the Turkish Republic of Northern Cyprus
- List of political parties in the Turks and Caicos Islands
- List of political parties in the United Arab Emirates
- List of political parties in the United Kingdom
- List of political parties in the United States
- List of political parties in the United States Virgin Islands
- List of political parties in Åland

== See also ==
- List of political ideologies
- List of populists
- Category:Political party disambiguation pages
