= Flag of the Khmer Republic =

Flag of Cambodia from 1970 to 1975

Khmer Republic
- Use: National flag and ensign
- Proportion: 2:3
- Adopted: 9 October 1970 (as national flag); 1993 (as war flag of the Royal Cambodian Armed Forces)
- Relinquished: 17 April 1975 (as national flag)
- Design: Blue field with a red canton; in the canton a white representation of Angkor Wat, in the upper fly corner three white stars

The flag of the Khmer Republic (Khmer: ទង់ជាតិសាធារណរដ្ឋខ្មែរ, Tóng chéatĕ Sathéarônârôdth Khmêr [tɔŋ ciət sathiəreaʔnaʔrɔət kʰmae]; lit. 'National flag of the Khmer Republic') is one of the historical flags of Cambodia. It consists of a blue field with a red rectangle in the canton. The red rectangle bears the Angkor Wat silhouette. Three large white stars are aligned horizontally on the upper corner of the blue field.

== History ==
The flag of the Khmer Republic was introduced on 9 October 1970 by the Lon Nol regime replacing the Royal Flag. It was the official flag of Cambodia for almost five years and it was displayed at the 1972 Summer Olympics where Cambodia officially competed under its new government after a long absence.

The flag was relinquished on 17 April 1975 when the Khmer Rouge overthrew the Khmer Republic and established Democratic Kampuchea and replaced the flag with a new flag of their own. The last place where it was hoisted was in May 1975 in the final area held by the Khmer National Armed Forces on the escarpment of Preah Vihear in the Dângrêk Mountains. Even though their government had surrendered, loyalist Khmer Republic soldiers continued to fiercely hold their ground for nearly a month after the fall of Phnom Penh. Finally that outpost fell to the Khmer Rouge on 22 May 1975. The flag of Democratic Kampuchea became the flag of Cambodia after the ousting of the republican government.

=== Later use ===
The Khmer Republic flag is still used afterwards by Cambodian opposition groups in exile, such as the Khmer Power Party (KPP), and by certain political parties within Cambodia, such as the Khmer Republican Party (KRP), though on a smaller scale if compared to the South Vietnamese flag. Khmer scholar Keng Vannsak commented that, according to Cambodian superstition, the choice of three stars was inauspicious. The Cambodian Liberty Party (CLP), the Hang Dara Democratic Movement Party (HDMP), the Khmer Front Party, the Khmer Improvement Party, the Khmer Loves Khmer Party and the Society of Justice Party also use the flag. The Royal Cambodian Armed Forces use the flag as its war flag.

== Symbolism ==
=== Pattern ===
The flag of the Khmer Republic kept the white three-towered Angkor Wat silhouette, as well as the blue and red colors of the royal flag that had preceded it, but in a different pattern.

=== Stars ===
According to Article 4 of the Constitutional Law of the Khmer Republic voted by the National Assembly on 7 October 1970, the three stars in the blue field represent the following:

- The Nation, the religion and the republic of Cambodia
- The Three powers of the State: Legislative, Executive, and Judicial
- The Three Jewels of Buddhism (Buddha, Dharma and Sangha)

== See also ==
- List of Cambodian flags
