= 2008 Cambodian general election =

- 27 July 2008
- All 123 seats in the National Assembly; 62 seats needed for a majority
- Turnout: 75.08% (▼8.14pp)
Party	Leader	Vote %	Seats	+/–
CPP	Chea Sim (Note: Hun Sen was the CPP's official prime ministerial candidate and leading figure throughout the campaign.)	58.11	90	+17
SRP	Sam Rainsy	21.91	26	+2
HRP	Kem Sokha	6.62	3	New
NRP	Norodom Ranariddh	5.62	2	New
FUNCINPEC	Nhek Bun Chhay	5.05	2	−24
This lists parties that won seats. See the complete results below.
Results by provinces
Prime Minister before	Prime Minister after
Hun Sen; CPP	Hun Sen; CPP

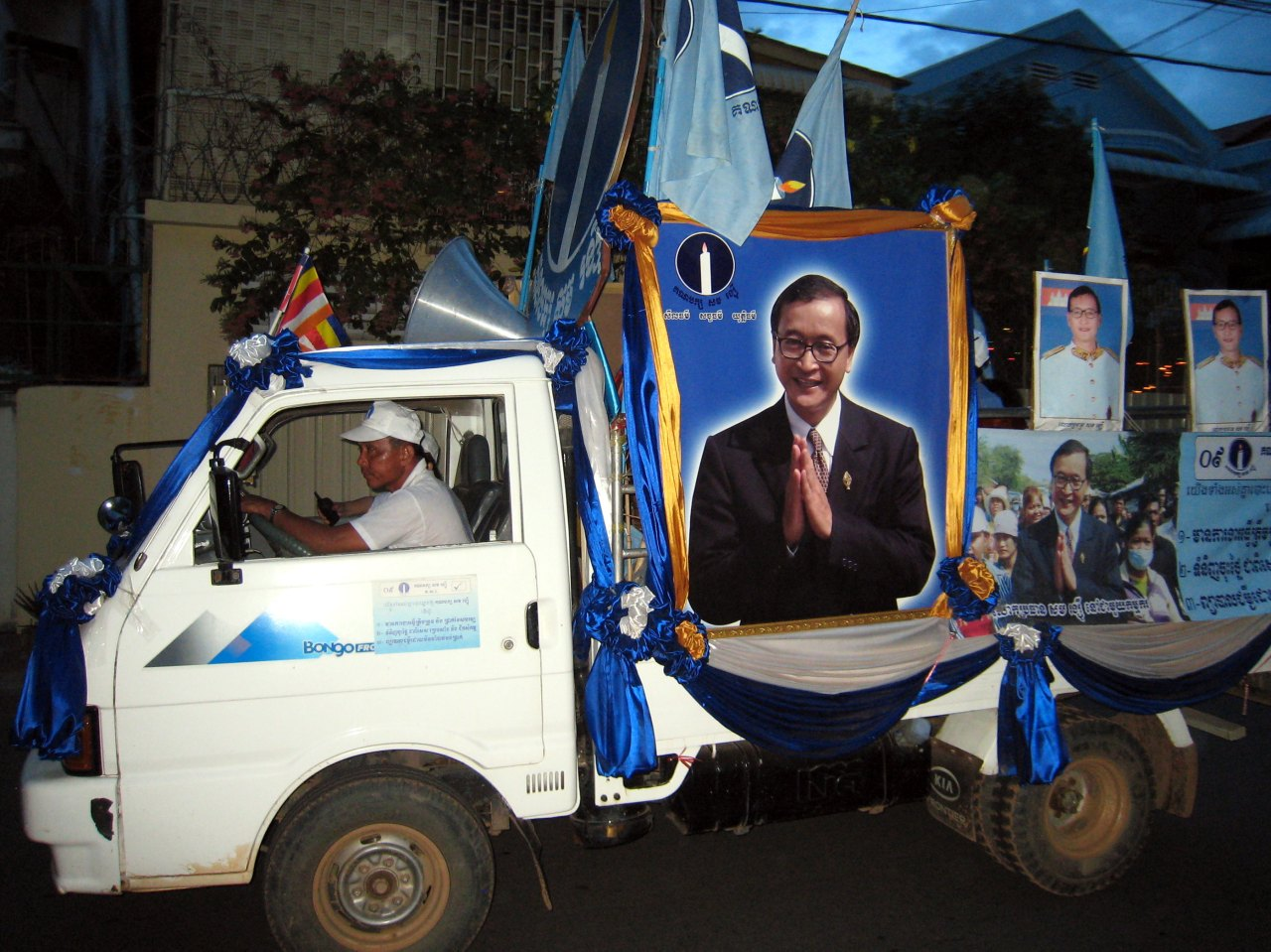
Sam Rainsy Party campaign bus

General elections were held in Cambodia on 27 July 2008. The result was a victory for the ruling Cambodian People's Party, which won 90 of the 123 seats.

== Background ==
Prime Minister Hun Sen announced the planned date of the elections on 30 May 2007, saying that the date of 27 July 2008 had been decided on because it was a holiday and because it fell exactly five years after the previous elections. While the ruling Cambodian People's Party was expected to retain its majority, FUNCINPEC was considered likely to fall behind the two major opposition parties, the Sam Rainsy Party and the Sangkum Jatiniyum Front Party. The newly founded Human Rights Party was also expected to make an impact.

== Campaign ==
By the deadline of 12 May 2008, only twelve parties had registered for the elections, only half of the 23 parties which contested the 2003 elections and a third of the 39 in the 1998 elections. Ten of those parties fielded candidates in all of Cambodia's 24 provinces and municipalities, while the remaining two fielded candidates in only nine and seven provinces, respectively. Ten parties were approved, one was asked to submit more documents and subsequently approved and one was denied registration.

In early July, the Khmer Anti-Poverty Party and the Society of Justice Party decided to form a political alliance, and the Khmer Republican Party also stated it was willing to make alliances.

== Conduct ==
The EU observing mission stated that based on the provisional results, the lead of the CPP was so large that there would have to be very large-scale fraud in order to call the CPP's victory into question. They still criticised the disenfranchisement of a large number of voters, but lauded the improvement over the 2003 elections; on the whole, however, the election fell short of international standards.

== Results ==
Preliminary results from CPP sources indicated that the CPP had won 58.3% of the vote and 91 seats, whilst the SRP had won 21.9% of the vote and 26 seats, with the Human Rights Party on three seats, the NRP on two and FUNCINPEC with one. NGOs and other supervising bodies stated that the distribution was more likely 70 for CPP and 50 for SRP.

Party	Votes	%	Seats	+/–
Cambodian People's Party	3,492,374	58.11	90	+17
Sam Rainsy Party	1,316,714	21.91	26	+2
Human Rights Party	397,816	6.62	3	New
Norodom Ranariddh Party	337,943	5.62	2	New
FUNCINPEC	303,764	5.05	2	–24
League for Democracy Party	68,909	1.15	0	New
Khmer Democratic Party	32,386	0.54	0	0
Hang Dara Democratic Movement Party	25,065	0.42	0	0
Society of Justice Party	14,112	0.23	0	New
Khmer Republican Party	11,693	0.19	0	New
Khmer Anti-Poverty Party	9,501	0.16	0	New
Total	6,010,277	100.00	123	0
Valid votes	6,010,277	98.51		
Invalid/blank votes	90,607	1.49		
Total votes	6,100,884	100.00		
Registered voters/turnout	8,125,529	75.08		
Source: COMFREL

== Aftermath ==
Prime Minister Hun Sen claimed victory the day after the elections, The stand-off with Thailand over the temple of Preah Vihear was widely seen as a successful attempt of the ruling CPP to garner more support. Analysts expected the CPP to increase its majority; as the constitution was amended to remove the need for a two-thirds majority to govern, requiring the more common simple majority instead, it was considered likely that the CPP would be able to govern without a coalition partner.

The CPP announced it would retain its coalition with the severely diminished FUNCINPEC, but ordered its leaders Keo Puth Rasmey and his wife Princess Arun Rasmey to stand down and let army general Nhek Bun Chhay take over; he would be the first non-royal to lead FUNCINPEC.

The SRP, HRP and NRP threatened to boycott the first parliamentary session unless the irregularities were investigated; the PM replied that in that case, the opposition's seats would be redistributed between CPP and FUNCINPEC.

== See also ==
- 4th National Assembly of Cambodia
