= Keith Mondesir =

Saint Lucian politician

Keith Raymond Rufus Mondesir (born January 23, 1948) is a Saint Lucian politician. He has been a United Workers Party member of the House of Assembly of Saint Lucia and a member of the Saint Lucian cabinet since 2006, serving in the administrations of John Compton and Stephenson King.

== Early life and career in Canada ==
Mondesir was born in Castries, grew up in Saint Lucia, and later moved to Canada. His ministerial biography indicates that he graduated from George Brown College and later earned a Bachelor of Science degree from the University of Waterloo, a further Bachelor of Science degree in Optometry from the University of Aston in Birmingham, and a Doctor of Optometry degree from the University of Houston in Texas. He worked as an optometrist in Winnipeg, Manitoba, for twenty-six years.

In 2000, the office of the Manitoba ombudsman received a complaint alleging that Mondesir had sold and disclosed patient information to Lenscrafters International Inc. As a result of the complaint, Mondesir became the first medical professional in Manitoba to be charged under the provisions of the province's Personal Health Information Act. His attorney, former cabinet minister Sidney Green, said that Mondesir had done nothing wrong and had not disclosed any health information or anything that could not be found in a telephone book.

On May 17, 2002, Mondesir pleaded guilty in the Provincial Court of Manitoba to disclosing personal health information to DPD Software Ltd. As the result of a plea bargain, he received an absolute discharge.

== Political career ==
In 2001, while still residing in Canada, Mondesir ran for a seat in the Saint Lucian assembly as a National Alliance candidate in Anse-la-Raye/Canaries. He finished second against incumbent candidate Cyprian Lansiquot of the governing Saint Lucia Labour Party.

Mondesir later returned to Saint Lucia on a full-time basis and joined the opposition United Workers Party, becoming one of its leading spokespersons and running for the party leadership in 2003. In 2005, he was the UWP's spokesperson on agriculture.

Minister

The UWP won a majority government under John Compton's leadership in the 2006 general election, and Mondesir was narrowly elected over Lansiquot in Anse-la-Raye/Canaries. When Compton formed a new administration on 19 December 2006, he appointed Mondesir as the country's minister of home affairs and national security. Shortly thereafter, Mondesir said the UWP would honour the previous government's commitment to allow Caricom nationals who had lived illegally in Saint Lucia over the last three years to seek full citizenship.

Mondesir was demoted to minister of national mobilization and physical development on 6 June 2007, following a public dispute with the country's police leadership. There is a news dispatch from August 2007 suggesting he had been returned to home affairs and national security by this time. In any event, when Stephenson King succeeded Compton as prime minister in September 2007, Mondesir's role was restructured as the minister of health, wellness, family affairs, national mobilisation, human services and gender relations.

Workers at the St. Lucian ministry of health took labour action against Mondesir in November 2007 in a bid to remove him from office. The action ended after Mondesir's permanent secretary was transferred to a different government department and Prime Minister King worked out an agreement with the ministerial workers' union.

Mondesir has developed health service links between Saint Lucia and Taiwan. He also accompanied Prime Minister King on a visit to Cuba in 2010 that was intended to build relations between the two countries.

In February 2011, Mondesir announced that Saint Lucia was planning to complete a new general hospital by the following year. He indicated that the health ministry would expand its services for the institution rather than contracting out to the private sector.

Mondesir delivered a statement to the United Nations General Assembly in June 2011 on Saint Lucia's policy for addressing HIV/AIDS.

Tuxedo Villas controversy

In August 2008, the opposition Saint Lucia Labour Party accused the King administration of allowing Mondesir to classify part of his Tuxedo Villas private residence as a tourism facility in order to take advantage of duty-free government concessions. Opposition leader Kenny Anthony subsequently brought the matter to court, and a High Court judge overturned Mondesir's tourism contract in August 2009 on the grounds of a perceived conflict-of-interest. Mondesir later repaid fifteen thousand dollars to the office of the Comptroller of Customs for duty-free concessions.

In June 2010, the Organization of Eastern Caribbean States's Court of Appeals ruled that the concessions offered by the King government to Mondesir were inappropriate. King dismissed attorney-general Nicholas Frederick from office over his handling of the matter. Mondesir retained his position.

== Electoral record ==
2006 Saint Lucian general election Anse-la-Raye/Canaries
Keith Mondesir	United Workers Party	2,132	51.00
(x)Cyprian Lansiquot	Saint Lucia Labour Party	2,042	48.85
Kensley Peter	Independent	6	0.14
Total valid votes		4,180
Spoiled ballots		81
Total votes casts		4,261	60.35
Total electorate		7,060

2001 Saint Lucian general election Anse-la-Raye/Canaries
(x)Cyprian Lansiquot	Saint Lucia Labour Party	2,061	58.65
Keith Mondesir	National Alliance	1,198	34.09
Petra Desir	United Workers Party	255	7.26
Total valid votes		3,514
Spoiled ballots		116
Total votes casts		3,630
