= Cyprian Lansiquot =

Saint Lucian lawyer and politician

Cyprian Lansiquot is a Saint Lucian lawyer and politician. He was a Labour Party member of the House of Assembly of Saint Lucia from 1997 to 2006 and served as a parliamentary secretary.

== Private career ==
Lansiquot has a diploma and a post-graduate diploma in agriculture from the University of the West Indies and has worked as an agricultural officer. He received a law degree from the University of Wolverhampton in 2004, was called to the Bar of England and Wales in November 2010, and joined the Saint Lucia Bar Association the following month.

== Politician ==
Lansiquot was elected for the Anse-la-Raye/Canaries constituency in the 1997 national elections, in which the Labour Party won a majority government. In May 1997, he was appointed by incoming prime minister Kenny Anthony as parliamentary secretary to the minister of communications, works, transport and public utilities. He held this position for the next five years, having won a second parliamentary mandate in 2001, and later served as parliamentary secretary to the minister of agriculture, forestry, and fisheries from 2002 to 2006.

Lansiquot fended off a high-profile challenge by trade union leader David Demacque for the Anse-la-Raye/Canaries Labour nomination in early 2006. The Labour Party was defeated in that year's general election, and Lansiquot narrowly lost his seat to Keith Mondesir of the United Workers Party.

== Electoral record ==
2006 Saint Lucian general election Anse-la-Raye/Canaries
Keith Mondesir	United Workers Party	2,132	51.00
(x)Cyprian Lansiquot	Saint Lucia Labour Party	2,042	48.85
Kensley Peter	Independent	6	0.14
Total valid votes		4,180
Spoiled ballots		81
Total votes casts		4,261	60.35
Total electorate		7,060

2001 Saint Lucian general election Anse-la-Raye/Canaries
(x)Cyprian Lansiquot	Saint Lucia Labour Party	2,061	58.65
Keith Mondesir	National Alliance	1,198	34.09
Petra Desir	United Workers Party	255	7.26
Total valid votes		3,514
Spoiled ballots		116
Total votes casts		3,630

1997 Saint Lucian general election Anse-la-Raye/Canaries
Cyprian Lansiquot	Saint Lucia Labour Party	2,813	65.69
Joseph Lawrence	United Workers Party	1,469	34.31
Total valid votes		4,282
Spoiled ballots		58
Total votes casts		4,340
