= Khmer Anti-Poverty Party =

Cambodian political party

Khmer Anti-Poverty Party គណបក្សខ្មែរឈប់ក្រ
- Leader: Daran Kravanh
- Founded: September 2007

The Khmer Anti-Poverty Party (Khmer: គណបក្សខ្មែរឈប់ក្រ) is a Cambodian political party founded in September 2007. Its leader is Cambodian-American Daran Kravanh.

== Political ideology ==
The Khmer Anti-Poverty Party believes in defending Cambodia's "territorial integrity" and opposes "any foreign tyrant leader". The party aims to prevent poverty and to create new ministries for the disabled and for job seekers. In the 2008 national election, the party proposed to bring American-style governance to Cambodia, claiming that the party had the support of 300 American advisers and governors.

In the 2013 election, the party claimed that it had the backing and support of 140,000 foreign advisers and 13 wealthy investors who would make the party's vision of ending poverty in Cambodia a success. However the party did not gain a seat in parliament.

== Political activities ==
An alliance between the KAPP, Society of Justice Party, and the Khmer Republican Party was announced in late June 2008 (in time for July national election), though it was retracted by the Khmer Republican Party within days. The party was expected to win 41 seats in the National Assembly in the election, but it garnered only 0.16% of the national vote and won no seats. Daran rejected the legitimacy of the election results.

== Electoral history ==
=== General election ===
Election	Leader	Votes			Seats		Position	Government
Election	Leader	#	%	±	#	±	Position	Government
2008	Daran Kravanh	9,501	0.16	–	0 / 125	–	11th	CPP
2013	Daran Kravanh	43,222	0.65	▲0.49	0 / 125	–	5th	CPP
2018	Daran Kravanh	55,298	0.87	▲0.22	0 / 125	–	8th	CPP
2023	Daran Kravanh	40,091	0.52	▼0.35	0 / 125	–	7th	CPP
