= KDP =

KDP may refer to:

== Businesses ==
- Kindle Direct Publishing, the e-publisher division of Amazon
- Keurig Dr Pepper, a beverage conglomerate

== Political parties ==
- Karpatendeutsche Partei (KdP; Carpathian Germany Party), Czechoslovakia
- Katipunan ng Demokratikong Pilipino, Philippines
- Khmer Democratic Party, Cambodia
- Kommunistische Partei Deutschlands, Germany
- Konstitutsionno-demokraticheskaya partiya (KdP), Russia
- Korea Democratic Party, South Korea
- Kurdish Democratic Party of Iran, Iran
- Kurdistan Democratic Party, Iraq
- Kansas Democratic Party, United States
- Kentucky Democratic Party, United States

== Other uses ==
- Kappa Delta Pi, a North American college fraternity
- Monopotassium phosphate, a salt used in food and optics
