= List of political parties in Western Europe =

This is a List of political parties in Western Europe, linking to the country list of parties and the political system of each country in the region.

== List of countries ==
	Country	Multi party	Two party	No party
(Austria)	Austria	•		
(Belgium)	Belgium	•		
(Denmark)	Denmark	•		
(Finland)	Finland	•		
(France)	France	•		
(Germany)	Germany	•		
(Iceland)	Iceland	•		
(Italy)	Italy	•		
(Liechtenstein)	Liechtenstein	•		
(Luxembourg)	Luxembourg	•		
(Malta)	Malta	•		
(Monaco)	Monaco		•	
(Netherlands)	Netherlands	•		
(Norway)	Norway	•		
(Portugal)	Portugal	•		
(Spain)	Spain	•		
(Sweden)	Sweden	•		
(Switzerland)	Switzerland	•		
(United Kingdom)	United Kingdom	•		

== See also ==
- International organisations in Europe
- List of political parties by region
- Politics of Europe
- Table of political parties in Europe by pancontinental organisation
