= List of political parties in Eastern Europe =

This is a list of political parties in Eastern Europe, linking to the country list of parties and the political system of each country in the region.

== List of countries ==
	Country	Multi party	Two party	Dominant party	Single party	No party
(Albania)	Albania	•				
(Armenia)	Armenia	•				
(Azerbaijan)	Azerbaijan			•		
(Belarus)	Belarus					•
(Bosnia and Herzegovina)	Bosnia and Herzegovina	•				
(Bulgaria)	Bulgaria	•				
(Croatia)	Croatia	•				
(Czech Republic)	Czech Republic	•				
(Georgia (country))	Georgia		•			
(Greece)	Greece	•				
(Hungary)	Hungary	•				
(Moldova)	Moldova	•				
(Montenegro)	Montenegro	•				
(North Macedonia)	North Macedonia	•				
(Poland)	Poland	•				
(Romania)	Romania	•				
(Russia)	Russia			•		
(Serbia)	Serbia			•		
(Slovakia)	Slovakia	•				
(Slovenia)	Slovenia	•				
(Turkey)	Turkey	•				
(Ukraine)	Ukraine	•				

== See also ==
- Council of Europe
- Eastern Europe
- Eastern European Group
- Eastern Partnership
- Euronest Parliamentary Assembly
- European integration
- International organisations in Europe
- List of political parties by region
- Politics of Europe
- Table of political parties in Europe by pancontinental organisation
