= List of political parties in Southern Europe =

This is a List of political parties in Southern Europe, linking to the country list of parties and the political system of each country in the region.

== List of countries ==
	Country	Multi party	Two party	Dominant party	Single party	No party
(Albania)	Albania	•				
(Andorra)	Andorra	•				
(Bosnia and Herzegovina)	Bosnia and Herzegovina	•				
(Croatia)	Croatia	•				
(Cyprus)	Cyprus	•				
(Gibraltar)	Gibraltar (UK)	•				
(Greece)	Greece	•				
(Italy)	Italy	•				
(Kosovo)	Kosovo	•				
(Malta)	Malta		•			
(Montenegro)	Montenegro	•				
(North Macedonia)	North Macedonia	•				
(Northern Cyprus)	Northern Cyprus	•				
(Portugal)	Portugal	•				
(San Marino)	San Marino	•				
(Serbia)	Serbia			•		
(Slovenia)	Slovenia	•				
(Spain)	Spain	•				
(Turkey)	Turkey	•				
(Vatican City)	Vatican City					•

== See also ==
- International organisations in Europe
- List of political parties by region
- Politics of Europe
- Table of political parties in Europe by pancontinental organisation
