= List of political parties in Northern Europe =

This is a List of political parties in Northern Europe, linking to the country list of parties and the political system of each country in the region.

== List of countries ==
	Country	Multi party	Two party	Dominant party	Single party	No party
(Åland)	Åland	•				
(Denmark)	Denmark	•				
(Estonia)	Estonia	•				
(Faroe Islands)	Faroe Islands	•				
(Finland)	Finland	•				
(Iceland)	Iceland	•				
(Republic of Ireland)	Ireland	•				
(Isle of Man)	Isle of Man		•			
(Latvia)	Latvia	•				
(Lithuania)	Lithuania	•				
(Norway)	Norway	•				
(Sweden)	Sweden	•				
(United Kingdom)	United Kingdom	•				

== See also ==
- International organisations in Europe
- List of political parties by region
- Politics of Europe
- Table of political parties in Europe by pancontinental organisation
