= List of political parties in Saint Lucia =

This article lists political parties in Saint Lucia. Saint Lucia has a two-party system, which means that there are two dominant political parties, with extreme difficulty for anybody to achieve electoral success under the banner of any other party.

== The parties ==
=== Major parties ===
Name	Abbr.	Founded	Ideology	Leader	Senators	Seats in Assembly
Labour Party	SLP	1950	Social democracy	Philip J. Pierre	6 / 11	14 / 17
United Workers Party	UWP	1964	Christian democracy; Conservatism	Allen Chastanet	3 / 11	1 / 17

=== Minor parties ===
- National Congress Party
- National Green Party

=== Defunct parties ===
- Lucian Greens Party
- Lucian People's Movement (LPM)
- National Alliance
- National Development Movement (NDM)
- People's Progressive Party
- Saint Lucia Freedom Party
- Sou Tout Apwe Fete Fini (STAFF)

== See also ==
- Politics of Saint Lucia
- List of political parties by country
