= List of political parties in North America by country =

This is a List of political parties in North America by country, linking to the country list of parties and the political system of each country in the region. Alphabetical Country List – Parties in North America with representation in their domestic federal parliament. Also noted are any affiliations with political internationals.

== List of countries ==
	Country	Multi party	Two party	Dominant party	Single party	No party
(Bermuda)	Bermuda		•			
(Canada)	Canada	•				
(Greenland)	Greenland	•				
(Mexico)	Mexico	•				
(Saint Pierre and Miquelon)	Saint Pierre and Miquelon	•				
(United States)	United States		•			

== See also ==
- List of political parties by United Nations geoscheme
- List of political parties in the Caribbean by country
- List of political parties in Central America by country
- List of political parties in South America by country
