= Sourn Serey Ratha =

Cambodian politician (born 1973)

- សួន សេរីរដ្ឋា

President of the Khmer Power Party
- In office March 18, 2010 – September 7, 2017
- Preceded by: Position established
- Succeeded by: Soung Sophorn

Personal details
- Born: September 7, 1973 (age 53) Battambang, Cambodia
- Citizenship: Cambodia; U.S.
- Party: Khmer Power Party
- Education: Royal University of Phnom Penh; MARA University Technology; Georgetown University; Boston University

Sourn Serey Ratha (Khmer: សួន សេរីរដ្ឋា; born September 7, 1973) is a Cambodian American republican politician, and the founder and former president of the Khmer Power Party (KPP).

He was convicted of inciting military personnel disobedience and demoralising the army based on a message he posted on Facebook urging the Royal Cambodian Armed Forces to resist orders from their leaders. He was sentenced to five years in prison but was granted a royal pardon by King Norodom Sihamoni after serving just over a year. He was also fined $2,500.
