= List of political parties in the Caribbean by country =

This is a List of political parties in the Caribbean by country, linking to the country list of parties and the political system of each country in the region.

== List of countries ==
	Country	Multi party	Two party	Dominant party	Single party	No party
(Anguilla)	Anguilla		•			
(Antigua and Barbuda)	Antigua and Barbuda		•			
(Aruba)	Aruba	•				
(The Bahamas)	Bahamas		•			
(Barbados)	Barbados		•			
(Belize)	Belize		•			
(British Virgin Islands)	British Virgin Islands		•			
(Cayman Islands)	Cayman Islands		•			
(Cuba)	Cuba				•	
(Dominica)	Dominica		•			
(Dominican Republic)	Dominican Republic	•				
(Grenada)	Grenada		•			
(Guadeloupe)	Guadeloupe	•				
(Guyana)	Guyana		•			
(Haiti)	Haiti	•				
(Jamaica)	Jamaica	•				
(Martinique)	Martinique		•			
(Montserrat)	Montserrat		•			
(Netherlands Antilles)	Netherlands Antilles	•				
(Puerto Rico)	Puerto Rico	•				
(Saint Kitts and Nevis)	Saint Kitts and Nevis		•			
(Saint Lucia)	Saint Lucia		•			
(Saint Vincent and the Grenadines)	Saint Vincent and the Grenadines	•				
(Suriname)	Suriname	•				
(Trinidad and Tobago)	Trinidad and Tobago		•			
(Turks and Caicos Islands)	Turks and Caicos		•			
(United States Virgin Islands)	United States Virgin Islands	•				
