= Khieu Rada =

Cambodian politician

Khieu Rada (born April 15, 1949 in Battambang) is a Cambodian politician. He is the son of Khieu In and Sing Tep.

== Education ==
- C final exam (1969), M.G.P. (Physical General mathematics - 1970)
- S.P.C.N. (Sciences, Physical, Natural Chemistry), Master es Sciences (1973)
- C.N.A.M. (General mathematics - 1982) in France
- AFPA of analysis Programming and Teleprocessing (1982) in France
- Engineer Conceptor (Capgemini)

== Politics ==
- President of the UPAKAF (Union of Patriots of the Kampuchea in France) in 1979
- Founding member of the Confederation of the Khmers Nationalists with Norodom Sihanouk in 1979
- Founding member of the FUNCINPEC in 1981 with Norodom Sihanouk
- President Director of the FUNCINPEC Television (Channel 9) in 1992
- Vice Minister of Relations with the Parliament of the G.N.P. in 1993
- Advisor of the Prime Minister the Prince Norodom Ranariddh from 1993 to 1994
- Honorary member of the Royal Cabinet with rank of Minister since the 28 January 1994
- Under Secretary of State of the Trade Ministry of Cambodia from 1994 to 1995
- Delegation Chief of Cambodia at United Nation Conference about Trade and Development
- Secretary General of the Khmer National Party (renamed to Sam Rainsy Party) Cambodia from 1995 to 1997
- President of the Khmer Unity Party (KUP) from 23 October 1997 to June 2006
- Vice Deleguate General of the Sangkum Jatiniyum Front Party of Prince Sisowath Thomico from July 2006 to September 2007
- President Adviser of Sam Rainsy Party from October 2007 to January 2008
- President Adviser of FUNCINPEC, Vice-President of Kampong Cham Province and President of Stung Trâng (Kampong Cham Province) since February 2008
