= List of political parties in Southeast Asia by country =

This is a List of political parties in Southeast Asia by country, linking to the country list of parties and the political system of each country in the region.

== List of countries ==
	Country	Multi party	Two party	Dominant party	Single party	No party
(Brunei)	Brunei					•
(Cambodia)	Cambodia		•	•		
(Timor-Leste)	East Timor	•				
(Indonesia)	Indonesia	•				
(Laos)	Laos				•	
(Malaysia)	Malaysia	•				
(Myanmar)	Myanmar		•			
(Philippines)	Philippines	•				
(Singapore)	Singapore			•		
(Thailand)	Thailand	•				
(Vietnam)	Vietnam				•	
