= List of political parties in Micronesia by country =

This is a List of political parties in Micronesia by country, linking to the country list of parties and the political system of each country in the region.

== List of countries ==
	Country	Multi party	Two party	Dominant party	Single party	No party
(Federated States of Micronesia)	Federated States of Micronesia					•
(Guam)	Guam		•			
(Kiribati)	Kiribati		•			
(Marshall Islands)	Marshall Islands					•
(Nauru)	Nauru					•
(Northern Mariana Islands)	Northern Mariana Islands	•				
(Palau)	Palau					•
