= Khmer Serei =

Rebel movement in Cambodia

- ខ្មែរសេរី
- Flag of the Khmer Republic, generally associated with the Khmer Serei
- Leader: Sơn Ngọc Thành
- Founded: Late 1950s
- Dissolved: 1975
- Country: Cambodia; South Vietnam (Note: A sizeable majority of the people who fought for the Khmer Serei were ethnic Khmer Kroms from the Mekong Delta of Vietnam. Their involvement in the movement increased especially during the 1970 Cambodian coup d'etat of the Cambodian Civil War, when the Khmer Serei attracted young Khmer Krom soldiers who were willing ro fight for Cambodia)
- Allegiance: Khmer Republic (1970 - 1972)
- Ideology: Anti-monarchism; Anti-communism; Anti-Sihanouk; Pro-Americanism; Republicanism
- Political position: Right-wing to far-right

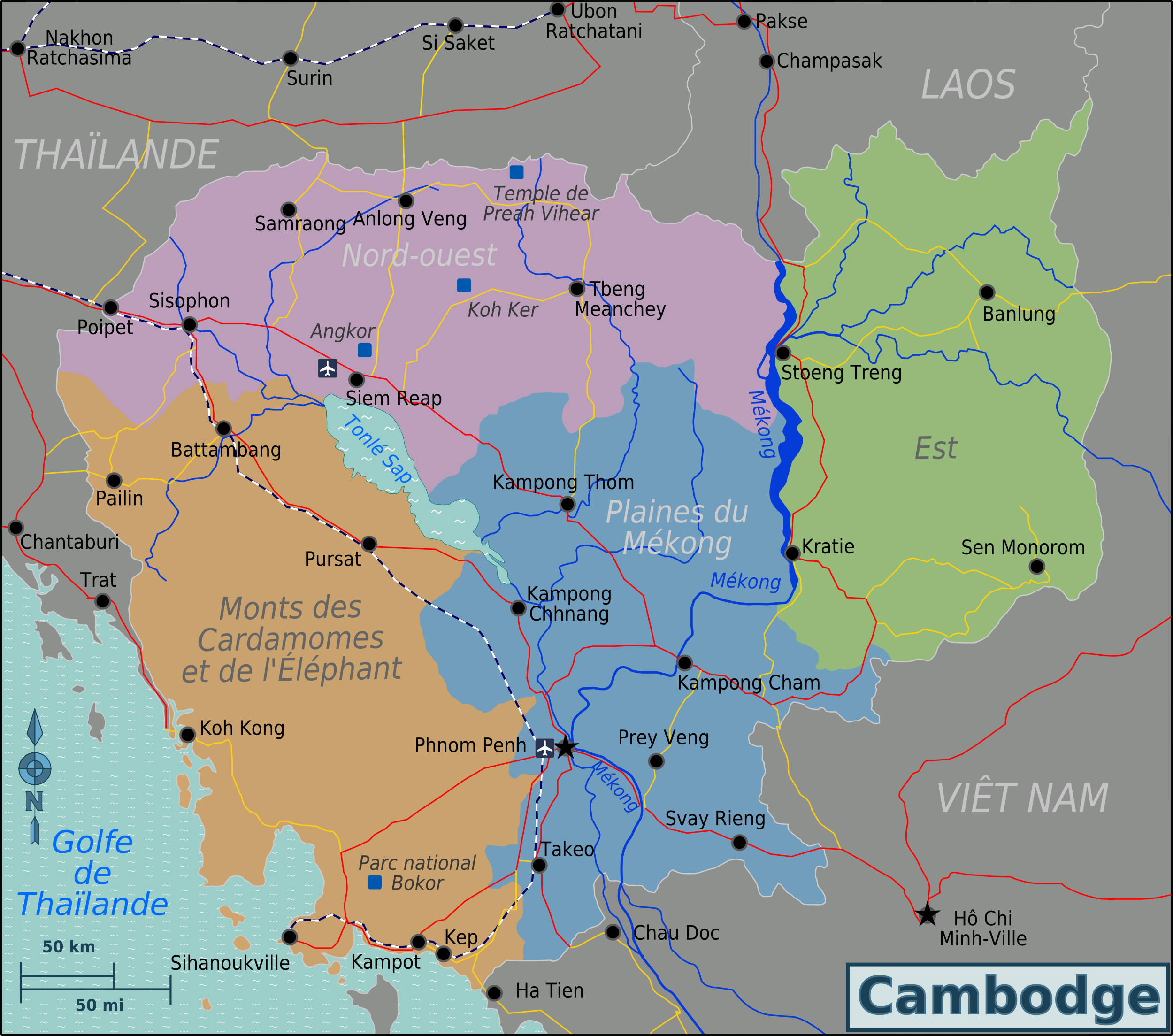
Cambodia's regions

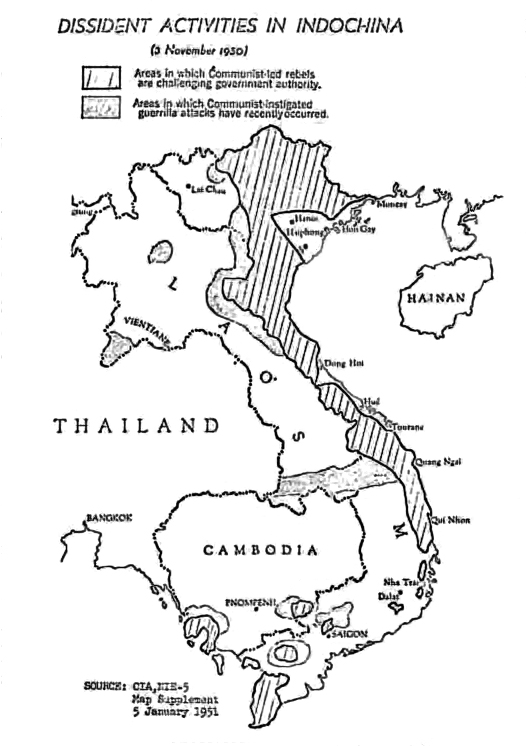
Dissident activities in Indochina, 1951

The Khmer Serei (Khmer: ខ្មែរសេរី, lit. 'Free Khmer' [kʰmae seːrəj]) were an anti-communist and anti-monarchist guerrilla force founded by Cambodian nationalist Sơn Ngọc Thành. In 1959, he published 'The Manifesto of the Khmer Serei' claiming that Norodom Sihanouk was supporting the 'communization' of Kampuchea (an ancient Khmer name for Cambodia). In the 1960s, the Khmer Serei were growing in numbers, hoping to become a major political and fighting force.

The primary objective of the Khmer Serei was to destabilize the existing powers held by Sihanouk and to overthrow his regime – and then to become a permanent part of the Cambodian body politic.

The Khmer Serei's relative lack of resources, poor timing, and lack of support relative to the Khmer Rouge majority and King Sihanouk led to the eventual decline of the group.

== Beginnings – before 1950s ==
According to Turkoly-Joczik's essay, the beginnings of the Khmer Serei's dissidences date back to periods before the Second Indochina War, tracing its origins back to Vietnam's Mekong Delta, in the town of Tra Vinh, Vinh Binh Province, the birthplace of Son Ngoc Thanh. In examining the political ambitions of Son Ngoc Thanh, we will better understand the reasons for the eventual formation of the Khmer Serei and their activities.

Son Ngoc Thanh did his studies in France. When he returned to Vietnam, he attempted to join the French Colonial Service but was declined. He then moved to Cambodia in the early 1930s, and secured a secretarial position in the Cambodian Buddhist Institute. While at the institute, he took the opportunity of his position as secretary and empowered patriotic monks to spread Buddhist and nationalistic sermons throughout Cambodia and into the Mekong Delta. In 1936, Thanh founded a newspaper to carry out his anti-French and pro-independence views and was involved in anti-French demonstrations. Thanh fled to Japan to escape possible imprisonment by the French and joined the Imperial Japanese Army as a commissioned officer. Thanh returned to Cambodia and, with support from Japan, started his political career. Thanh eventually held positions of Foreign Minister and later on as Prime Minister of Cambodia. However, his position as Prime Minister was short-lived. Thanh was arrested and put on trial for treason.

After the trial, he was put on house arrest in France. While on house arrest, a group of his supporters with military support were recruiting and establishing themselves near the border provinces of Thailand, Cambodia and South Vietnam. These militant supporters of Thanh were known as the Khmer Issarak ("independent" Khmer), who shared Thanh's pro-independence goals. The Khmer Issarak were armed bands active within Cambodian borders during the later French colonial period. The armed struggles with the French caused serious disruption to the Cambodian economy in 1946–1947.

== Khmer Issarak and the formation of Khmer Serei in 1950s ==
Thanh's political supporters gained control of the Democratic Party and won the national election of September 1951. Facing mounting political pressure, Sihanouk was forced to request Thanh's release from house arrest. Thanh was eventually released the next month. Upon his return to Cambodia, Thanh resumed his political activities and founded a newspaper whose rhetoric angered Sihanouk and his French advisers, thereby risking imprisonment. In order to avoid arrest, Thanh fled to the Cambodian jungles and took refuge with the Khmer Issarak. During this period, the Khmer Issarak was believed to be about three thousand strong with a substantial percentage with access to military arms.

From 1952 to 1954, the Khmer Issarak carried out small-scale attacks against local police and initiated audio broadcasts of anti-Sihanouk propaganda messages along the Thai-Cambodian border. Strategically, they operated mainly from bases on the Thai and Vietnamese borders, recruiting from the Khmer Krom minority of the Mekong Delta in Vietnam.

However, things were not going as planned for Thanh. By 1955, Sihanouk had put a dent in the Khmer Issarak forces by offering amnesty to those who would return to the "national" fold. Clearly Thanh had underestimated Sihanouk's influence and large numbers of Khmer Issarak had put down their arms. Realizing the error, Thanh attempted to reconcile with Sihanouk but was not successful in doing so. Therefore, in 1956, with aid from American, he created the Khmer Serei movement – uniting the remaining Issarak factions. While Thanh and his forces were receiving aid from the Americans, it was believed that these actions led to the tarnishing of his image among Cambodians.

Between 1955 and 1959, Thanh was to remain in the forest to organise guerrilla warfare and propaganda activities against Sihanouk. The Khmer Serei continued to be a source of disturbance to the Sihanouk government, organizing dissident activities along the border provinces of Cambodia.

More significantly, many of these Issarak leaders would become key actors in the events of late 1960s and 1970s, as the old Issarak divisions re-formed as the Khmer Rouge, Khmer Serei and the lesser-known White Khmers.

== The Khmer Serei and major events in the 1960s ==
By the 1960s, the Khmer Serei continued to recruit new members from the Khmer Krom. With the experiences gained during the last decade, they had become conditioned into a well-trained force, both disciplined and well-armed. During this time, Sihanouk's increasing unpredictability resulted in a trickle of young men and women fading into the forest, joining Thanh's cause, possibly causing the Khmer Serei numbers to swell.

In 1961, Sihanouk severed diplomatic relations with Bangkok over the 'Thai support' provided to the Khmer Serei. By 1963, Thanh strategically moved the Khmer Serei moved back to South Vietnam for financial and material support from the Saigon government. Moving back to the Mekong Delta area gave Thanh the potential to recruit new members from the large populations of Khmer Kroms living there.

In addition, the U.S. Special Forces and its Civilian Irregular Defense Group (CIDG) would become its allies, and recruited the Khmer Serei into its ranks. The recruited members maintained their membership to Khmer Serei and were also obligated to bear arms for the Saigon government. This was beneficial on two fronts: firstly, the monetary rewards from joining the CIDG were more regular and higher than what they previously obtained and therefore many were recruited; secondly, the Khmer Serei was able to maintain its identity and building itself as a single cohesive force.

Although there is no official documentation that shows the organisational working structure and functional responsibilities of the Khmer Serei movement, there is one cited source derived from personal observation: The movement's military organisation coincided with the structure of the CIDG, that is, the Khmer Serei were organised into platoons, companies and battalions. Whether this was coincidental, or to accommodate the CIDG, is unknown.

Therefore, it was possible that their leader, Thanh had indeed maintain tight control over the group but it was structurally led by junior leaders in their respective military units. According to sources, the Khmer Serei headquarters was located at the Cambodian Buddhist compound and supported by field headquarters on the Cambodian border at the South Vietnamese village of Tinh Bien, in close proximity to the Seven Mountains region of the border. With exception of the independent Khmer Serei units along the border, virtually all of the other Khmer Serei personnel were associated with the U.S. Army Special Forces' activities conducted in the Mekong Delta. It is estimated that at least fifty percent of all Khmer Krom CIDG soldiers were also members of the Khmer Serei.

The Khmer Serei also had loose links with the US-backed Front de Lutte du Kampuchea Krom militia, or "White Scarves" (Khmer: Kangsaing Sar; Vietnamese: Can Sen So), of Southern Vietnam. This group, founded by a Khmer Krom monk named Samouk Sen, sought Khmer Krom independence and regularly clashed with the Viet Cong: it expanded in the 1960s and later became affiliated to FULRO, a paramilitary organisation for Vietnamese minority groups. Members of both the Khmer Kampuchea Krom and the Khmer Serei were trained by the US military for clandestine operations during the Second Indochina War as part of MIKE Force, and were partly financed and armed by the Central Intelligence Agency (CIA). At their peak in 1968, the Khmer Serei and related forces were thought to number up to 8000 men.

The Khmer Serei participated in a number of general intelligence gathering missions. It is believed that they assisted Project GAMMA, an intelligence gathering mission on the North Vietnamese Army (NVA) bases in Cambodia, as well as providing support to Cambodia against the North Vietnamese and Viet Cong, one of these activities from Project Gamma was Operation Cherry. It was also suggested that the Khmer Serei were involved in making liaison with unnamed units in Cambodia as part of intelligence gathering on the North Vietnamese Army's dispositions and to develop a strategy for the Cambodian Army movements. The Khmer knew the terrain and language well and therefore were invaluable to the mission. According to one U.S. Army commander, the Khmer Serei were good soldiers: They knew the border area, could communicate with the local populations, and could get intelligence about the Viet Cong and what they were doing in their sanctuaries across the border.

In addition, member of the Khmer Serei has anti-communist contacts in the Cambodian Army who were sympathetic to any plan to rid Cambodia of the North Vietnamese presence. The information provided would have been crucial to the success of any plan for a military incursion into Cambodia, and it gives an indication of the importance of the Khmer Serei's role in Operation Cherry.

== Sihanouk government's response to the Khmer Serei movement ==
The Khmer Serei were generally viewed as a minor irritant by the media but Sihanouk was infuriated by its existence and by its clandestine radio broadcast emanating from the Thai and South Vietnamese borders, which made scurrilous attacks on him and the royal family. Therefore, the Cambodian leadership took serious and active measures to stop them. To Sihanouk, the rebels were 'traitors to the constitution and the nation'. Sihanouk saw the Khmer Serei as a genuine threat and therefore the Cambodian regime viewed the insurgency seriously: allegations later surfaced that Sihanouk had executed as many as 1000 Khmer Serei suspects during his rule.

This was evident in the events which led to the 1963 arrest, public caging and subsequent execution of Preap In, a Khmer Serei activist who had offered to go to the National Assembly to negotiate directly with Sihanouk, was a prominent example of the Sangkum's repression of the Khmer Serei. The execution of In, a former member of the Democratic Party, was filmed and shown in all cinemas for a month, an event which remained in the memories of Cambodians for many years.

== Mass defection of Khmer Serei and dissolution in 1969 ==
In early 1969, five hundred Khmer Serei soldiers defected from South Vietnam to Cambodia. The defectors were welcomed back to Cambodia and were integrated into the Cambodian armed forces. There were two suggested theories about these defections: the first was that Son Ngoc Thanh had order five hundred men to defect so that the Khmer Serei could infiltrate the Cambodian forces and subvert Sihanouk's government; the second was that the defectors were actually employed by the CIA in order to reinforce Lon Nol and his forces when they made their move to depose Sihanouk. The rationale to these defections were never explained by the CIA or Thanh; however, these defectors did support Lon Nol's government to fight against the North Vietnamese forces based in Cambodia. They were effectively used by Lon Nol to reinforce his own forces and later used to strengthen the Cambodian Army in its battle against the North Vietnamese and Khmer Rouge.

However, in the same year, Thanh formally announced the dissolution of the Khmer Serei organisation and pledged support to the Lon Nol government, and was made special councilor to Lon Nol and later as Prime Minister of Cambodia.

== Khmer Serei in the 1970s ==
After the Cambodian coup of 1970, the Khmer Serei participated in the Second Indochina War. It was believed that at least three battalions, consisting approximately 1500 Khmer Serei troops re-enforced the US-supported Vietnamese troops in Cambodia. The troops were ready and could be inserted by air into Phnom Penh. Lon Nol saw the elite Khmer Serei troops as a political threat and inserted them into the worst 'meat-grinder' battles and few Khmer Serei soldiers survived these 'suicide missions'.

After the war, Khmer Serei forces remain stunted and underdeveloped. Their efforts to achieve political and economic breakthroughs after the coup proved to be disastrous – instead of political freedom, they found themselves under the direct control of Lon Nol. Many of their leading members were arrested or killed.

Following the 1975 Khmer Rouge victory and the proclamation of Democratic Kampuchea, the few remaining "Free Khmer" operating in the north-west, in the area of the Dangrek Mountains, found themselves mostly in refugee camps along the Thai-Cambodian border, such as Nong Chan and Nong Samet. After the fall of Cambodia in 1975, the Khmer Serei or groups identifying themselves as Khmer Serei became a source of disruption along the Thai-Cambodian border. The Khmer Serei had become highly fractionized and seemingly without an overall leader.

During this period, the Khmer Serei had been reduced to 'a collection of petty warlord movements' that operated along the Thai-Kampuchean frontier. At various intervals during the 1980s, these groups composed of Khmer Rouge and various pro-Sihanouk or pro-Son Sann factions conducted sporadic military activities against President Heng Samrin's Vietnamese-sponsored People's Republic of Kampuchea (PRK). Son Sann was to use some of these former Khmer Serei supporters as the basis of the Khmer People's National Liberation Front movement, formed in 1979.

Without Son Ngoc Thanh, the movement lacked a central command to coordinate its combat operation, public information, and recruitment. As a consequence, those calling themselves Khmer Serei had become no more than groups of independent free agents. It was also reported that a number of the remaining Khmer Serei groups has become 'little more than black marketeers or bands of extortionists' who preyed on the defenseless in the border refugee camps. Other reports informed of internal fighting between different Khmer Serei groups and were not longer a 'united cohesive force' against the forces of Heng Samrin.

According to Robert Turkoly-Joczik, "like many dissident movements in Cambodia, the Khmer Serei has become an aberration, a political anomaly that haunts the Cambodian hinterlands as a specter of lost hope and a promise unfulfilled."
