= Union of Cambodian Democrats =

- Leader: Norodom Ranariddh; Sam Rainsy; Son Soubert
- Founded: 1997; 29 years ago
- Merger of: FUNCINPEC; Khmer Nation Party; Son Sann Party
- Ideology: Royalism; Liberalism; Buddhist democracy
- Political position: Left-wing to Right-wing

The Union of Cambodian Democrats was a political alliance in Cambodia, which was formed by three political parties, one of them being the Khmer Nation Party of Sam Rainsy, Prince Norodom Ranariddh was involved as well. These three political parties called their umbrella group the "Union of Cambodian Democrats". It was created in exile in 1997 after a coup d'etat. The leaders of three political parties which united their leadership and political parties together to create the Union of Cambodian Democrats were Sam Rainsy's Sam Rainsy Party, Son Sann's Buddhist Liberal Democratic Party (later led by Son Soubert) and also prince Norodom Ranariddh's FUNCINPEC party. However, from the late 1990s onwards a new political party, the Bou Hel and Ty Chhin's Khmer Neutral Party, became part of the alliance .

Its goals are democracy, peace and sovereignty of what they consider as being the territories of Cambodia.
