= George Odlum =

Saint Lucian diplomat (died 2003)

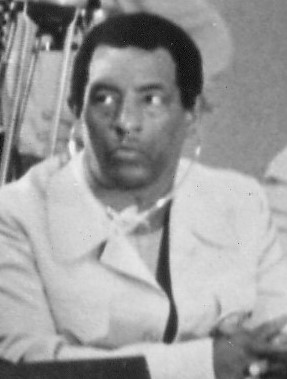
- Odlum in 1979

Foreign Minister of Saint Lucia
- In office 1979–1981
- Preceded by: John Compton
- Succeeded by: Peter Josie
- In office 1997–2001
- Preceded by: Vaughan Lewis
- Succeeded by: Julian Hunte

Ambassador to the United Nations
- In office 1995–1996

Deputy Prime Minister
- In office July 1979 – May 1981
- Prime Minister: Allan Louisy
- Preceded by: George Mallet
- Succeeded by: Peter Josie

Personal details
- Born: Castries
- Died: 28 September 2003 Castries
- Party: Saint Lucia Labour Party
- Education: University of Bristol; University of Oxford
- Profession: politician

George Odlum (died 28 September 2003) was a Saint Lucian left-wing politician who served as Deputy Prime Minister and Foreign Minister. Born in Castries, Odlum studied at Bristol University and Oxford University in the United Kingdom before returning to Saint Lucia as Permanent Secretary to the Ministry of Trade. After working for the Commonwealth Secretariat and the West Indies Associated States, he formed the Saint Lucia Forum, a left-wing pressure group. This group merged with the Saint Lucia Labour Party in time for the 1974 elections; although the Party did not win, the progress they made allowed them to take power in 1979, with Odlum as Deputy Prime Minister.

Although a secret agreement originally stated that Odlum would take power after six months, his support for Cuba and similar left-wing nations led to American pressure to keep him out. After months of negotiations, Odlum was dismissed as Deputy Prime Minister, and the ensuing government weakness and infighting led to its defeat in the 1982 election. In opposition, Odlum was made Ambassador to the United Nations, resigning in 1996. When the Labour Party came to power again a year later, he became Foreign Minister, overseeing the establishment of stronger relations with both Cuba and China. Amidst controversy over his alleged alliance with the opposition, Odlum resigned in 2001. Never again returning to power, he died on 28 September 2003 following a battle with pancreatic cancer.

Odlum's legacy is controversial: while noted as a skilled orator who cared deeply for Saint Lucia's working class, his idealism, support for controversial figures such as Muammar Gaddafi and departure from two Labour administrations were noted as factors which harmed him and others around him. Despite this, his funeral saw widespread grieving, with Ralph Gonsalves, the Prime Minister of Saint Vincent and the Grenadines, describing him simply as a "giant of a man".

== Early life ==
Odlum was born in Castries, the son of a barber. He studied economics at Bristol University, becoming the first Afro-Caribbean head of the University of Bristol Union before moving to Magdalen College, Oxford in 1959, where he studied Philosophy, Politics and Economics and was one of the few Afro-Caribbean students to attend. At university, Odlum acted, played both football and cricket, and became noted as a successful debater. After graduating from Oxford he returned to St Lucia in 1961, becoming a Permanent Secretary in the Ministry of Trade. He moved back to the United Kingdom in 1964 to work as an economist in the Commonwealth Secretariat, leaving 3 years later. Returning to St Lucia again, he became Executive Secretary to the Council of Ministers of the West Indies Associated States.

== Career ==
During the early 1960s, St Lucia and the other West Indies Associated States were British colonies, with a limited degree of self-rule. In St Lucia, the Saint Lucia Labour Party was considered the traditional party for "political and constitutional advance" but, despite this, it lost the general election in 1964 to the United Workers Party, a right-wing party led by John Compton that continued to rule until 1979. In response Odlum, a socialist, founded the Saint Lucia Forum, a pressure group that discussed "the socialist and black cultural ideas which were beginning to challenge the Caribbean status quo". This was part of a group of Forums established in 1970 following secret talks with other left-wing Caribbean intellectuals, including Maurice Bishop. In 1972 Odlum left his job with the Council of Ministers to form the St Lucia Action Movement, which later merged with a weakened Labour Party in time for the 1974 general election.

Odlum's faction of the Labour Party did most of the work in the election, building their power base among the banana-producing small farmers, with Odlum leading frequent strikes in an attempt to improve working conditions. His work in the 1974 election, along with his "good looks and charisma", yielded a safe seat in Castries, which he allowed his brother to run for. Odlum instead chose to campaign for a rural seat held by the United Workers Party, which he lost by a small margin. Despite the Labour Party still being in opposition in Saint Lucia, socialism and left-wing politics were on the rise in the Caribbean as a whole and, during his time out of Parliament, Odlum was the public face of socialism in the region.

Saint Lucia gained full independence in 1979. Immediately beforehand, Odlum organised large protests in front of international news cameras, further cementing his role in the region's communist and socialist movement. Three weeks after independence, the nearby country of Grenada saw the overthrow of its government by communists revolutionaries led by Maurice Bishop. When the United Workers Party called a general election in Saint Lucia three weeks later, Compton's government fell – Odlum was returned to Parliament and the Labour Party, led by Allan Louisy, came to power.

=== Deputy Prime Minister ===
Odlum's prominent role within the party led to his immediate appointment as Deputy Prime Minister, with the portfolios of foreign affairs and trade and industry. He publicly supported the Grenadian revolutionaries, who were constructing a new airport with Cuban support. Ronald Reagan alleged that this was to be used as a launching point for Soviet aircraft, and Odlum's support for it worried both the Americans (due to their concerns about the purposes of the new facility) and his fellow communists, who saw him as a "loose cannon" and thought that his continuing public championing of it would further draw American attention.

Louisy had become Prime Minister thanks to a secret agreement with Odlum that he would resign, allowing Odlum to take over, within 6 months. When the time came Louisy refused, backed by the Americans, who wanted to keep Odlum out of office at all costs. This saw Odlum turn against his own government and even vote against the budget. A second proposal that Louisy resign was rejected on 30 December 1980, with the power struggle continuing despite his agreement to hand over some of his portfolios. The dispute continued into 1981, with Odlum attracting controversy by announcing on 3 March that he had not ignored the possibility of his grouping within the Labour Party splitting and joining the United Workers Party.

The result was the 1981 dismissal of Odlum as Deputy Prime Minister and the resignation of Louisy. Louisy was succeeded not by Odlum, but by Winston Cenac, who himself resigned eight months later on 16 January 1982. Cenac was succeeded by Michael Pilgrim in an attempt by moderates in the Labour Party to avoid the possibility of Odlum leading the country. By this point Odlum had left the party, forming the Progressive Labour Party (PLP). Pilgrim's government also collapsed, necessitating an early general election in 1982 in which the Labour Party was left with only 3 of the 17 seats, returning the United Workers Party to government and seeing Odlum dismissed from Parliament. His Progressive Labour Party won only a single seat.

=== Ambassador and Foreign Minister ===
Now outside Parliament, Odlum maintained his presence in the public eye through meetings and the work of his newspaper, The Crusader. His revenge over the Labour Party finally occurred during the 1987 general election, when the PLP split the vote and denied his old allies victory. In 1995 he accepted the position of Ambassador to the United Nations from Compton, his old enemy, holding it for only a year. When Compton resigned in 1996, Odlum chose to stand for election against his successor and lost the contest.

After again allying with the Labour Party in 1997, Odlum was returned to Parliament, receiving appointment as Foreign Minister in the government of Kenny Anthony. In this position, he oversaw the improvement of diplomatic relations with Cuba, announcing that a consulate would be established there and spearheading the signing of a joint Cuban-Saint Lucian trading agreement to oversee improvements in the agricultural and healthcare sectors. Odlum's ministry also saw the diplomatic recognition of China in 1997, following month-long negotiations and the offer of several million dollars' worth of aid to Saint Lucia. Taiwan responded to the announcement by breaking off relations, stating that the government's move to recognise China had harmed Taiwan's "national interests and dignity". After diplomatic relations were officially established, Odlum visited China between 5 and 12 September.

Odlum resigned in 2001 after a series of controversies. His fellow ministers accused him of conspiring against the government and attempting to have it overthrown and replaced with a new administration. Odlum, on the other hand, argued that ruling members of the Labour Party had been making efforts to remove him and that the "dastardly act" of cutting away a significant portion of his constituency in a boundary change was what had forced him over the edge. His resignation came immediately before a letter of dismissal arrived at his house.

Odlum formed the National Alliance party to contest the 2001 elections, but the party failed to win any seats.

== Retirement and death ==
Odlum attracted controversy in November 2002 when he spoke at the funeral service for Antiguan politician Tim Hector. His speech censured the attendees for what he perceived as mourning Hector in death while failing to support him in life, asking "were you there when the ballot process was contaminated to declare him a loser? Were you there?". His speech was criticised by Vere Bird, Jr., the Antiguan Minister of Agriculture, Lands and Fisheries, who called Odlum's words "strident and ill-informed reflections".

Following a long fight against cancer, spending most of the last year of his life in and out of hospital, Odlum died on 28 September 2003 in Tapion Hospital, Castries, aged 69. The body lay in state on 5 October, where it was viewed by Pearlette Louisy, Kenny Anthony, and members of the Cabinet. Odlum's funeral was held on 6 October, with a 30-vehicle procession travelling from Vieux Fort to Castries; it was led by a pair of police outriders and a coach carrying the coffin, draped in the national flag. St Lucian citizens were reported to be openly weeping at Odlum's death. The funeral itself was held in a park, due to no church in Castries being large enough to hold the number of mourners. During the service, sections of his most famous speeches were broadcast from loudspeakers. James Fletcher, a Cabinet Secretary, had previously announced that all flags would be flown at half-mast for the day as a tribute.

Edwin Carrington, the Secretary-General of the Caribbean Community, stated that Odlum "served his country, St Lucia, with distinction" and was "charismatic, eloquent and a consummate master of communication, both in speaking and writing...one of the region's leading and most persistent exponents on the debilitating effects of the erosion of trade preferences for the region's banana industry on the livelihood of the people". Other tributes came from Ralph Gonsalves, the Prime Minister of Saint Vincent and the Grenadines, who described Odlum as "one of the region's finest political orators, who was persuasive, eloquent and was able to command attention universally, not only in his native capital city Castries but also at the United Nations, in Geneva, Cape Town or in London".

In 2004, on the anniversary of his death, a series of activities were organised in memory of Odlum. These included the dedication of a tomb at the Choc Cemetery and a service at the Mount of Prayer in Coubaril that was attended by his family and close friends.

== Legacy ==
Odlum, known simply as "Brother George", had a controversial legacy. He was noted as one of the region's greatest orators, able to command attention not only in Saint Lucia itself, but at the United Nations and on the world stage. Supporters praised his connection with the working class, and his fight for better pay and conditions in the agricultural sector.

At the same time, both critics and supporters point towards awkward elements of his personality and career. Gonsalves, at his funeral, noted that "the strictures of bureaucratic systems he found difficult to be contained within", while his obituary in The Times described him as a man "with more flamboyance than substance". His resignation from the two Labour administrations, as well as his alliances with the UWP and other factions, were noted as contradictions which would require historical debate and assessment. His support of figures such as Fidel Castro and Muammar Gaddafi was also noted as controversial, with his relentless left-wing approach to politics being identified as damaging both to others and to the causes he championed.
