= Preap In =

- ព្រាប អ៊ិន
- Born: 1938; Kampong Trach, Kampot, French Indochina
- Died: January 1964 (aged 25–26); Trapeang Kraleung, Kampong Speu Province, Cambodia
- Cause of death: Execution by firing squad
- Occupation: Political dissident
- Organization: Khmer Serei

Preap In (Khmer: ព្រាប អ៊ិន, 1938–1964) was a Cambodian political dissident of the 1950s–1960s.

A high-level cadre of the Khmer Serei, a rightist militia formed to oppose the regime of Prince Norodom Sihanouk, In is remembered largely for an unsuccessful 1963 attempt to 'negotiate' directly with Sihanouk, resulting in his arrest and public execution by firing squad.

== Biography ==
In was born in Kampong Trach, Kampot, into a farming family, and was the nephew of In Tam, a provincial governor and prominent Cambodian politician of the post-independence years. In studied engineering in Phnom Penh; like Tam, he was a member of the Democratic Party, a broadly leftist, pro-independence party that was absorbed into Sihanouk's Sangkum movement in the later 1950s.

At some point In joined the Khmer Serei, an anti-communist and anti-monarchist guerrilla movement founded by the exiled politician Son Ngoc Thanh; the Khmer Serei operated largely in areas on the Thai and South Vietnamese borders, and were thought to be at least partly funded by the CIA. Sihanouk was later to describe In as "one of the right-hand men" of Son Ngoc Thanh.

== Arrest ==
Preap In's uncle, In Tam, is thought to have met with his nephew and offered assurances that In would be given safe-conduct to negotiate directly with Sihanouk in the National Assembly. Sihanouk was to describe In as mistakenly supposing he was to negotiate Sihanouk's "surrender", though this is likely to be an exaggeration. It seems that In put forward a proposal involving the return of Thanh to Cambodia, though whether this was a genuine coup plot or merely an amnesty for Thanh remains unclear.

Preap In and an associate, Saing San (described as a chauffeur at the Royal Palace) were arrested in Takeo on 19 November 1963; they were brought to Phnom Penh and displayed in cages in public. Although San was soon to be released, In was brought before the National Assembly, where he readily 'confessed' that his organisation, the Khmer Serei, was funded and controlled by the CIA with the intention of overthrowing Sihanouk. Sihanouk asked the assembly to decide In's fate, and interpreted the response as a demand for the death penalty.

He was then handed over to a military tribunal, who sentenced him to death; "in his case, I had no inhibitions in signing the death warrant", commented Sihanouk. The Preap In affair was used by Sihanouk to underline his rejection of American aid from 1963.

== Execution ==
In was executed by firing squad at Trapeang Kraleung, Kampong Speu Province, in January 1964.

The execution was filmed, and the fifteen-minute newsreel was shown in cinemas across Cambodia for a month prior to the main feature; many Cambodians were deeply shocked by the film, which remained in their memories for many years. As a result, Preap In is still remembered in Cambodia as a figure of opposition to the Sangkum: the former Cambodian Prime Minister, Hun Sen, several times threatened to broadcast the film of In's execution as part of his public disagreements with Sihanouk.
