= United People of Cambodia =

United People of Cambodia គណបក្សសង្គមខ្មែរនិយម
- Leader: Sarath Oeurn
- Founded: August 2003
- Ideology: Big tent
- Political position: Syncretic; Fiscal: Left-Wing; Social: Right-Wing

Party flag

The United People of Cambodia was a political party created by its former president, Sarath Oeurn, in August 2003. Oeurn lives in America and only visits Cambodia and his party once a year in July. At the moment it is not led by Oeurn but its acting party president Tit Thang.

== Political ideology ==
Its political ideology on the right-wing promotes controlling illegal immigration in a responsible manner as their president says illegal immigrants not only create “instability” because they came to Cambodia illegally but also because they sometimes ”tend to do illegal things.” The party also has a left-wing ideology as part of its political position where the UPC would prevent “unequal distribution of wealth” and “land management”. This political party wishes that when it gets to have some control of the “government” UPC would fulfill “a tax on large land holdings in order to decrease the number of land disputes.”

The party president believes this will prevent rich people from trying “to take land and might even give up land because of the tax burden," in order to "free up uncultivated land." Therefore, that would mean society would be able to use that land to grow food for themselves. With its activities the UPC has been fielding candidates in 13 communes, primarily in the provinces called Svay Rieng and Prey Veng.
