= List of populists =

The following is a list of populist parties, leaders and movements.

== Africa ==
=== Burkina Faso ===
- Thomas Sankara

=== Burundi ===
- Pierre Nkurunziza

=== Cameroon ===
- Paul Biya

=== Egypt ===
- Gamal Abdel Nasser
- Abdel Fattah el-Sisi

=== Equatorial Guinea ===
- Teodoro Obiang Nguema Mbasogo

=== Gabon ===
- Ali Bongo Ondimba

=== The Gambia ===
- Yahya Jammeh

=== Ghana ===
- Jerry Rawlings

=== Kenya ===
- Raila Odinga

=== Liberia ===
- George Weah

=== Libya ===
- Muammar Gaddafi

=== Rwanda ===
- Paul Kagame

=== South Africa ===
- Economic Freedom Fighters
- Freedom Front Plus
- Jacob Zuma

=== Sudan ===
- Omar al-Bashir

=== Tanzania ===
- John Magufuli

=== Tunisia ===
- Kais Saied
- Heart of Tunisia

=== Uganda ===
- Idi Amin
- Yoweri Museveni

=== Zambia ===
- Michael Sata

=== Zimbabwe ===
- ZANU-PF

== Americas ==
=== Argentina ===
- Carlos Menem (1989-1999)
- Néstor Kirchner (2003-2010)
- Cristina Fernández de Kirchner (2007–2015)
- Javier Milei (2023–present)

=== Bolivia ===
- Evo Morales (2006-2019)

=== Brazil ===
- Getúlio Vargas (1930-1945)
- Fernando Collor de Mello (1990-1992)
- Lula da Silva (2003-2011, 2023–present)
- Jair Bolsonaro (2019–2022)

=== Canada ===
- Preston Manning (1997-2000)
- Niki Ashton (2008–present)
- Maxime Bernier (2018–present)
- Rob Ford (2000-2016)
- Doug Ford (2018–present)
- Pierre Poilievre (2022–present)
- Danielle Smith (2009–present)
- Kevin O'Leary

=== Chile ===
- Francisco Javier Errázuriz Talavera
- Joaquín Lavín
- Marco Enríquez-Ominami
- Carlos Bianchi Chelech
- Daniel Jadue
- José Antonio Kast
- Pamela Jiles
- Frente Amplio
- The List of the People
- Party of the People
  - Franco Parisi

=== Colombia ===
- Álvaro Uribe (2002-2010)
- Rodolfo Hernández Suárez

=== Cuba ===
- Fidel Castro (1959-2008)

=== Ecuador ===
- Abdalá Bucaram (1996-1997)
- Lucio Gutiérrez (2003-2005)
- Rafael Correa (2007-2017)
- Abdalá Bucaram Jr. (2009-2014)

=== El Salvador ===
- FMLN
- Nuevas Ideas
  - Nayib Bukele (2012–present)

=== Guatemala ===
- Guatemalan National Revolutionary Unity

=== Mexico ===
- Andrés Manuel López Obrador

=== Nicaragua ===
- Daniel Ortega (1979-1990) (2007–present)

=== Paraguay ===
- Fernando Lugo (2008-2012)

=== Peru ===
- Alberto Fujimori (1990-2000)
- Pedro Castillo
- Keiko Fujimori
- Rafael López Aliaga

=== United States ===
- Huey Long (1928-1935)
- William Jennings Bryan
- George Wallace (1946-1955, 1963-1968, 1971-1979, 1983-1987)
- Edwin Edwards (1964-1996)
- Mike Gravel (1969-1981)
- Ronald Reagan (1967-1989)
- Ron Paul (1976-1977, 1979–1985, 1997–2018)
- Pat Buchanan (1985-2000)
- David Duke (1989-1992)
- Jesse Jackson (1991-1997)
- Bernie Sanders (1991–present)
- Ross Perot (1992-1996)
- Roy Moore (1992–present)
- Joe Arpaio (1993–2017)
- Reform Party (1995–present)
- Jim Jordan (1995–present)
- Greg Abbott (1996–present)
- Dennis Kucinich (1997-2013)
- Steve King (1997-2021)
- Andy Harris (1999–present)
- Andy Biggs (2001–present)
- Ted Cruz (2003–present)
- Tim Ryan
- Louie Gohmert (2005–present)
- John Fetterman (2006–present)
- Sarah Palin (2006–present)
- Tea Party movement
- Matt Gaetz (2010–2024)
- Paul Gosar (2011–present)
- Ron Johnson (2011–present)
- JD Vance (2016–present)
- Allen West (2011–present)
- Tulsi Gabbard (2013–present)
- Scott Perry (2013–present)
- Kelli Ward (2013–2023)
- Elizabeth Warren (2013–present)
- Donald Trump, 45th and 47th President (2015–present)
- Amanda Chase (2016–present)
- Josh Hawley (2017–present)
- Jamaal Bowman (2020–present)
- Mary Miller (2020–present)
- Cori Bush (2020–present)
- Andrew Yang
- Ralph Nader
- Zohran Mamdani (2021-present)
- Ron DeSantis (2019-present)
- Occupy movement

=== Venezuela ===
- Rafael Caldera (1994-1999)
- Hugo Chávez (1999-2013)
- Nicolás Maduro (2013–present)

== Asia ==
=== Bangladesh ===
- Sheikh Hasina

=== Mainland China ===
- Xi Jinping

=== Hong Kong ===
- Civic Passion
- League of Social Democrats
- People Power
- John Lee
- Junius Ho

=== India ===
- Narendra Modi
- Bharatiya Janata Party
- Shiv Sena
- Bal Thackeray
- Yogi Adityanath
- Amit Shah
- Devendra Fadnavis
- LK Advani
- Shyam Prasad Mukherjee

=== Indonesia ===
- Joko Widodo
- Prabowo Subianto

=== Iran ===
- Mahmoud Ahmadinejad
- People's Mujahedin of Iran

=== Israel ===
- Benjamin Netanyahu

=== Japan ===
- Shinzo Abe
- Tōru Hashimoto
- Shintaro Ishihara
- Yuriko Koike
- Junichiro Koizumi
- Tarō Yamamoto
- Yuichiro Tamaki
- Japan Innovation Party
- Democratic Party For the People
- Reiwa Shinsengumi

=== Malaysia ===
- Syed Saddiq

=== Myanmar ===
- National League for Democracy

=== Pakistan ===
- Benazir Bhutto
- Imran Khan and Pakistan Tehreek-e-Insaf

=== Philippines ===
- Rodrigo Duterte
- Sara Duterte
- Joseph Estrada
- Bongbong Marcos
- Ferdinand Marcos

=== South Korea ===
- Han Dong-hoon
- Hong Joon-pyo
- Kim Moon-soo
- Lee Jae Myung
- Moon Jae-in
- Yoon Suk Yeol

=== Sri Lanka ===
- Mahinda Rajapaksa

=== Taiwan ===
- Chen Shui-bian
- Han Kuo-yu
- Tsai Ing-wen
- Terry Gou

=== Thailand ===
- Thaksin Shinawatra
- Yingluck Shinawatra
- Pheu Thai Party

=== Turkey ===
- Justice and Development Party
  - Recep Tayyip Erdoğan
- Peoples' Democratic Party
- Nationalist Movement Party

== Europe ==
=== Austria ===
- Freedom Party of Austria
- Communist Party of Austria

=== Belarus ===
- Alexander Lukashenko

=== Belgium ===
- Vlaams Belang
- Workers' Party of Belgium

=== Bosnia and Herzegovina ===
- Alliance of Independent Social Democrats
  - Milorad Dodik

=== Bulgaria ===
- Revival
- There is Such a People
- GERB
  - Boyko Borisov
- Bulgarian Socialist Party
- Attack
- Reload Bulgaria
- National Front for the Salvation of Bulgaria
- National Movement for Stability and Progress

=== Croatia ===
- Homeland Movement
- The Bridge
- Home and National Rally
- Croatian Democratic Alliance of Slavonia and Baranja
- Croatian Party of Rights
- Croatian Party of Rights 1861
- Croatian Party of Rights Dr. Ante Starčević
- Croatian Democratic Peasant Party
- Human Shield

=== Czechia ===
- ANO 2011
  - Andrej Babiš
- Freedom and Direct Democracy
- Motorists for Themselves
- PRO Law Respect Expertise
- Tricolour
- Communist Party of Bohemia and Moravia
- Oath Civic Movement

=== Denmark ===
- Danish People's Party
- Red-Green Alliance
- Denmark Democrats
- New Right

=== Estonia ===
- Conservative People's Party of Estonia
- Estonian Centre Party

=== France ===
- La France Insoumise
  - Jean-Luc Mélenchon
- National Rally
  - Marine Le Pen
- Reconquête
- Debout la France
- Movement for France
- Pierre Poujade, founder of Poujadism.
- Yellow vests movement

=== Finland ===
- Rural Party (1959-1995)
- Finns Party
- Left Alliance
- Radical People's Party (1944-1950s)

==== Åland Islands ====
- Ålandic Democracy

=== Georgia ===
- Georgian Dream
- Alliance of Patriots of Georgia
- Mikheil Saakashvili

=== Germany ===
- Alternative for Germany
  - Alice Weidel
- The Left
- Sahra Wagenknecht Alliance - Reason and Justice
- The Homeland

=== Greece ===
- Golden Dawn
- Course of Freedom
- Syriza
- Independent Greeks
- Popular Orthodox Rally
- Greek Solution

=== Hungary ===
- Fidesz
  - Viktor Orbán
- Our Homeland Movement
- Tisza Party
  - Péter Magyar

=== Iceland ===
- Pirate Party
- People's Party
- Centre Party

=== Ireland ===
- Sinn Féin
- Socialist Party
- People Before Profit

=== Italy ===
- Silvio Berlusconi (1993–2023)
- Brothers of Italy
- Five Star Movement
- League
- New Force
- CasaPound
- Communist Refoundation Party
- Potere al Popolo

=== Latvia ===
- Latvia First
- National Alliance
- Awakening
- Latvian Association of Regions
- For a Humane Latvia
- Platform 21
- Aldis Gobzems
- Artuss Kaimiņš

=== Lithuania ===
- Labour Party

=== Luxembourg ===
- Alternative Democratic Reform Party
- The Left

=== Moldova ===
- Our Party
- Democracy at Home Party

=== Montenegro ===
- Milo Đukanović
- Democratic Party of Socialists of Montenegro
- New Serb Democracy
- Movement for Changes
- Democratic People's Party
- True Montenegro

=== Netherlands ===
- Party for Freedom
- Socialist Party
- JA21
- Forum for Democracy

=== North Macedonia ===
- Nikola Gruevski

=== Norway ===
- Progress Party
- Red Party

=== Poland ===
- Law and Justice
- Confederation Liberty and Independence
- Left Together
- Kukiz'15
- Real Politics Union

=== Portugal ===
- Chega
- Left Bloc
- Portuguese Communist Party

=== Romania ===
- Alliance for the Union of Romanians
- S.O.S. Romania
- Party of Young People
- Liviu Dragnea
- Social Democratic Party
- Traian Băsescu
- Romanian Socialist Party

=== Russia ===
- Narodniks
- Vladimir Putin
- Vladimir Zhirinovsky

=== Serbia ===
- Serbian Progressive Party
  - Aleksandar Vučić
- Socialist Party of Serbia
  - Slobodan Milošević
  - Ivica Dačić
- Dveri
- Serbian Radical Party
- New Democratic Party of Serbia
- United Serbia
- Do not let Belgrade drown
- Strength of Serbia Movement
- Serbian People's Party
- Enough is Enough
- New Serbia
- Serbian Renewal Movement (formerly)
- Serbian Patriotic Alliance (defunct)
- Yugoslav Left (defunct)

=== Slovakia ===
- Direction - Social Democracy
  - Robert Fico
- Slovak National Party
- Vladimír Mečiar
- People's Party Our Slovakia
- Republic
- Slovakia
  - Igor Matovič
- We Are Family

=== Slovenia ===
- Slovenian Democratic Party
- Resni.ca

=== Spain ===
- Podemos
- Vox
- United Left
- Together for Catalonia

=== Sweden ===
- Sweden Democrats
- Left Party
- Alternative for Sweden

=== Switzerland ===
- Swiss People's Party
- Swiss Party of Labour
- Ticino League
- Federal Democratic Union of Switzerland
- Geneva Citizens' Movement

=== Ukraine ===
- Communist Party of Ukraine
- Svoboda
- Radical Party of Oleh Liashko
- Volodymyr Zelenskyy

=== United Kingdom ===
- British National Party
- Democratic Unionist Party
- Respect Party
- Scottish Socialist Party
- Jeremy Corbyn
- Boris Johnson
- Liz Truss
- UK Independence Party
- Reform UK
  - Nigel Farage
- Zack Polanski
- Ed Miliband

== Oceania ==
=== Australia ===
- John Curtin
- Gough Whitlam
- Pauline Hanson's One Nation
  - Pauline Hanson
- Craig Kelly
- Peter Dutton (2022–2025)
- Tony Abbott (2009-2015)
- United Australia Party
  - Clive Palmer
  - Ralph Babet
- Bob Katter
- Australian Greens
- Matthew Guy (2014-2018, 2021–2022)
- Campbell Newman (2011-2015)
- Joh Bjelke-Petersen (1968-1987)
- Jacinta Nampijinpa Price

=== New Zealand ===
- Robert Muldoon (1975-1984)
- New Zealand First
- Winston Peters
- David Seymour

== See also ==
- Populism
