= List of political parties in Southern Asia by country =

This is a List of political parties in Southern Asia by country, linking to the country list of parties and the political system of each country in the region.

== List of countries ==
	Country	Multi party	Two party	Dominant party	Single party	No party
(Afghanistan)	Afghanistan					•
(Bangladesh)	Bangladesh	•				
(Bhutan)	Bhutan	•				
(India)	India	•				
(Iran)	Iran	•				
(Maldives)	Maldives	•				
(Nepal)	Nepal	•				
(Pakistan)	Pakistan	•				
(Sri Lanka)	Sri Lanka	•				
