= Daran Kravanh =

Canadian-American politician

Daran Kravanh is a Cambodian-American musician and politician. He is the leader of the Khmer Anti-Poverty Party.

He is since 2016 as well the President of the human rights NGO "Justice for Cambodia Committee".

During several visits to Brussels in November and December 2017, he succeeded to convince the European Parliament to vote on 14 December 2017 an urgent resolution on the human rights situation in Cambodia, asking among others that the EU Commission should prepare a list of individuals responsible for the dissolution of the opposition and other serious human rights violations with a view to imposing possible visa restrictions and asset freezes on them.

== Early life ==
Kravanh was born in Pursat province. He grew up in a musical family and was an accordion player. While he was attending college, he was taken by Khmer Rouge soldiers to be killed along with other students and intellectuals.
