= Cambodian Liberty Party =

Cambodian Liberty Party គណបក្សសេរីភាពកម្ពុជា
- Founder: Chea Chamroeun
- President: Sisowath Chakrey Noukpol
- Founded: November 2015
- Political position: Centre-right

Party flag

The Cambodian Liberty Party (CLP; Khmer: គណបក្សសេរីភាពកម្ពុជា) is a Cambodian political party founded in November 2015 by former Cambodian People's Party lawmaker Chea Chamroeun. Prince Sisowath Chakrey Noukpol was chosen President of the party on May 4, 2016.
