= Sou Tout Apwe Fete Fini =

Former political party in Saint Lucia

Sou Tout Apwe Fete Fini (Creole for Drunk After the Party Finishes) was a political party in Saint Lucia. Led by TV host Chris Hunte, it contested five seats in the 2001 general elections, but received just 230 votes and failed to win a seat. It did not contest any further elections. The party satirised the political system in which politicians use rum and chicken to attract voters. The STAFF Party symbol was a rum bottle.
