= List of political parties in Eastern Asia by country =

This is a List of political parties in Eastern Asia by country, linking to the country list of parties and the political system of each country in the region.

== List of countries ==
	Country	Multi party	Two party	Dominant party	Single party	No party
(China)	People's Republic of China				•	
(Taiwan)	Republic of China (Taiwan)	•				
(Hong Kong)	Hong Kong (PRC)	•				
(Japan)	Japan	•				
(North Korea)	Democratic People's Republic of Korea				•	
(South Korea)	Republic of Korea	•				
(Macau)	Macau (PRC)	•				
(Mongolia)	Mongolia	•				
