= Khmer Loves Khmer Party =

Khmer Loves Khmer Party គណបក្សខ្មែរស្រឡាញ់ខ្មែរ
- Leader: Hienh John Theo
- Founded: 2008
- Ideology: Nationalism; Republicanism; Conservatism
- Slogan: ឯកភាព សេរីភាព យុត្តិធម៌ Unity, Freedom, Justice

Party flag

Website
- http://www.klkp.org/

Khmer Loves Khmer Party (Khmer: គណបក្សខ្មែរស្រឡាញ់ខ្មែរ) is a Cambodian Political Party founded in 2008. It believes in democracy and ideas like in its slogan "Unity, Liberty and Justice". Therefore, its political position has broadened and represents many ideologies like some of the liberal oriented ideology since it believes in not big but smaller government can create "Significant changes and results can be obtained through smaller government", helping to create changes and results from all the individuals that make up Cambodian society. The idea of people also having the "freedom of choice" in their lives means they can choose anything like food, healthcare, politics etc. which is a value of the KLKP's liberal ideology.

== Ideology ==
The party seems also to combine the ideologies of socialism and nationalism since KLKP says in its vision for all Cambodians in the country and overseas and to unite and help develop Cambodia so it can be a country that has "social equality" and a "higher living standard". One example of promoting an idea on the right of the political spectrum is where the KLKP chooses to respect the "Constitution of Cambodia". The KLKP also will protect it from "being violated by any individual" which seems to be a position that seems to be part of the nationalist ideology of the KLKP.

The other part of the KLKP's ideological position that is socialist is one that chooses to bring "new modern medical equipment and supplies" to keep "up-to-date equipment and supplies for modern medicines" to the hospitals. Apart from that any "supplies that are out of date or expired" must be suitably disposed. The "Rights for Foreign Cambodians" are those Cambodians living outside Cambodia that have the "rights to vote" in their "Cambodian embassy or Cambodian councils". Finally its external policy will be one of working with the "international community" for a safely stable Cambodia and "world peace" as well as opposing dictators "abusing human rights".

== Activities ==
On 2–3 May 2008 a cyclone hit Burma and the southern part of it called the Irrawady delta that according to the United Nations' Office for the Coordination of Humanitarian Affairs has left "77,738" people dead and "55,917" other people missing. The Khmer Loves Khmer Party and its leader Hienh John Theo responded to that disaster in Burma by sending a message to the Burmese ambassador that the KLKP will donate $100 to the Red Cross Myanmar Relief and Development.

Khmer Loves Khmer Party is actively working to promote its "Cover-Up" campaign where it asks people to contact them through the internet with their e-mail address and phone number to give any spare clothes to the KLKP so it can "redistribute to children and those who need them in Cambodia".

== See also ==
- List of political parties in Cambodia
- Politics of Cambodia
- Portal:Politics
