= List of humanist political parties =

The following is a list of political parties that follow the philosophical doctrine of humanism as a political ideology:

== Active parties ==
=== Africa ===
Angola

- Humanist Party of Angola (PHA)

=== America ===
Argentina

- Civic Coalition ARI (CC-ARI)
- Humanist Party (PH)

Chile

- Humanist Party (PH)

Peru

- Peruvian Humanist Party (PHP)

=== Asia ===
Japan

- Komeito

=== Europe ===
Bulgaria

- Movement for Social Humanism (DSH)

Denmark

- Freedom List

France

- Overseas, Territories, Independents, Freedom, Ecology and Solidarity (Utiles)
- Résistons! (R!)
- La France Humaniste (LFH)

Germany

- Party of Humanists (PdH)

Iceland

- Humanist Party (H)

Italy

- Humanist Party (PU)

Luxembourg

- Together – The Bridge (Bréck)

Portugal

- React, Include, Recycle (R.I.R.)

Romania

- Social Liberal Humanist Party (PUSL)

Spain

- Humanist Party (PH)

== Former parties ==
=== America ===
Brazil

- Humanist Party of Solidarity (PHS)

Canada

- Humanist Party of Ontario (HPO)
- Parti humaniste du Québec (PHQ)

Guatemala

- Humanist Party of Guatemala (PHG)

Mexico

- Humanist Party (PH)

Paraguay

- Paraguayan Humanist Party (PHP)

=== Europe ===
Belgium

- Humanist Democratic Centre (CDH)

Denmark

- Humanist Party (DHP)

France

- Humanist Party (PH)

Hungary

- Humanist Party (HP)

Portugal

- Humanist Party (PH)

Romania

- Conservative Party (PC)

Switzerland

- Humanist Party of Switzerland (HPS/PHS/PUS)
