= List of political parties in Polynesia by country =

This is a List of political parties in Polynesia by country, linking to the country list of parties and the political system of each country in the region.

== List of countries ==
	Country	Multi party	Two party	Dominant party	Single party	No party
(American Samoa)	American Samoa	•				
(Cook Islands)	Cook Islands		•			
(French Polynesia)	French Polynesia	•				
(Niue)	Niue					•
(Pitcairn Islands)	Pitcairn Islands					•
(Samoa)	Samoa	•				
(Tokelau)	Tokelau					•
(Tonga)	Tonga					•
(Tuvalu)	Tuvalu					•
(Wallis and Futuna)	Wallis and Futuna	•				
