= Saint Lucia Freedom Party =

Political party

The Saint Lucia Freedom Party was a political party in Saint Lucia led by human rights lawyer Martinus Francois. It contested the 2001 general elections, but received just 18 votes, failing to win a seat.
