= List of political parties in Crimea =

This article lists political parties in Crimea.

== In parliament ==
Parties represented in the State Council of Crimea:

- United Russia
- Liberal Democratic Party of Russia
- Communist Party of the Russian Federation
- A Just Russia

== Defunct parties ==
- Milliy Firqa
- Republican Party of Crimea
- Electoral Bloc of Kunitsyn
- For Yanukovych!
- Russian Bloc
- Qurultai-Rukh
- Soyuz
