= List of political parties in Dominica =

This article lists political parties in Dominica.

Dominica has a two-party system, which means that there are two dominant political parties, with extreme difficulty for anybody to achieve electoral success under the banner of any other party.

== The parties ==
=== Parliamentary parties ===
Party	Abbr.	Ideology	House of Assembly
Dominica Labour Party	DLP	Social democracy	19 / 32

=== Other parties ===
Party	Abbr.	Ideology
Dominica Freedom Party	DFP	Conservatism
People's Party of Dominica	PPOD	Third Way; Communitarianism
United Workers' Party	UWP	Centrism
Team Unity Dominica	TUD	Progressivism
Unity Party of Dominica	UPD	Centrism; Pro-US Statehood
Alternative Peoples' Party	APP	
United Progressive Party	UPP	

=== Defunct parties ===
- Socialist Workers Party (SWP)
- Dominica Liberation Movement (DLM)
- Dominica Progressive Party (DPP)
- Dominica United People's Party (DUPP)
- People's Democratic Movement (PDM)

== See also ==
- List of political parties by country
