= People's Party of Dominica =

- Leader: Sapphire Carrington
- Chairman: Co-Chairs
- Spokesperson: Ria Williams
- Founded: November 3rd, 2015
- Headquarters: Constitutional Hill, Roseau, Dominica
- Ideology: Communitarianism; Progressivism; Third Way
- Political position: Radical centre
- House of Assembly: 0 / 21

Website
- voteppod.tumblr.com www.voteppod.com

The People's Party of Dominica (P-POD) is a political party in the Commonwealth of Dominica.

== Background ==
P-POD is a political party in the Commonwealth of Dominica. It was founded on November 3, 2015, by Sapphire Carrington (formerly Claudine Williams). The party is centre-Right on the political spectrum. It did not contest either the 2019 Dominican general election or the 2022 Dominican general election.

P-POD has previously worked for youth development by conducting grassroots organization efforts, educational activities, and electoral campaigns throughout the island.

== History ==
This political movement began in the summer of 2015. P-POD became an official political party by the fall of the same year. The policy platform of the People's Party of Dominica outlines their positions on a variety of issues and the actions its leadership will take to implement them once elected. P-POD aims to promote equity, participation, pluralism, transparency, accountability, and the rule of law.

== Structure and composition ==
The People's Party has two local committees:

1. The People's National Committee (PNC). The PNC motto is "Progress is Everyone's Business". The PNC is composed of nominated members from every village in Dominica and the Diaspora. Three Co-chairs, a Secretary, and a Treasurer oversee the daily operations of this committee. The PNC conducts most of its business virtually. It is scheduled to begin holding National Meetings to conduct business in person quarterly at strategic locations on the island.
2. The Orange Parliamentarians Campaign Committee (OPCC). Their tagline is "Building Momentum Moving Forward". The OPCC provides a platform to inspire positive action and to help the people of Dominica. The OPCC does this by taking economic action, having sustainable goals, using proven systems, and creating deep-rooted policies.

== Geographic distribution ==
P-POD has its strongest popular support throughout the Roseau constituency and Mahaut constituency, with small pockets throughout the island. P-POD's caucus is composed mostly of progressives and centrists.
