= List of political parties in Africa by country =

This is a List of political parties in Africa by country, linking to the country list of parties and the political system of each country in the region.

== Northern Africa ==
	Country	Multi party	Two party	Dominant party	Single party	No party
(Algeria)	Algeria	•				
(Egypt)	Egypt	•				
(Libya)	Libya	•				
(Morocco)	Morocco	•				
(Sudan)	Sudan			•		
(Tunisia)	Tunisia	•				
(Western Sahara)	Western Sahara				•	

== Central Africa ==
	Country	Multi party	Two party	Dominant party	Single party	No party
(Angola)	Angola			•		
(Cameroon)	Cameroon			•		
(Central African Republic)	Central African Republic	•				
(Chad)	Chad			•		
(Democratic Republic of the Congo)	Congo (Kinshasa)	•				
(Republic of the Congo)	Congo (Brazzaville)	•				
(Equatorial Guinea)	Equatorial Guinea			•		
(Gabon)	Gabon			•		
(São Tomé and Príncipe)	São Tomé and Príncipe					

== Southern Africa ==
	Country	Multi party	Two party	Dominant party	Single party	No party
(Botswana)	Botswana			•		
(Lesotho)	Lesotho	•				
(Namibia)	Namibia			•		
(South Africa)	South Africa			•		
(Eswatini)	Eswatini					•
(Zimbabwe)	Zimbabwe			•		

== Western Africa ==
	Country	Multi party	Two party	Dominant party	Single party	No party
(Benin)	Benin	•				
(Burkina Faso)	Burkina Faso					•
(Cape Verde)	Cape Verde		•			
(Ivory Coast)	Cote d'Ivoire			•		
(The Gambia)	Gambia			•		
(Ghana)	Ghana	•				
(Guinea)	Guinea			•		
(Guinea-Bissau)	Guinea-Bissau	•				
(Liberia)	Liberia	•				
(Mali)	Mali					•
(Mauritania)	Mauritania	•				
(Niger)	Niger					•
(Nigeria)	Nigeria	•				
(Senegal)	Senegal	•				
(Sierra Leone)	Sierra Leone	•				
(Togo)	Togo			•		

== Eastern Africa ==
	Country	Multi party	Two party	Dominant party	Single party	No party
(Burundi)	Burundi	•				
(Comoros)	Comoros	•				
(Djibouti)	Djibouti			•		
(Eritrea)	Eritrea				•	
(Ethiopia)	Ethiopia			•		
(Kenya)	Kenya	•				
(Madagascar)	Madagascar	•				
(Malawi)	Malawi	•				
(Mauritius)	Mauritius	•				
(Mozambique)	Mozambique	•				
(Rwanda)	Rwanda	•				
(Somalia)	Somalia	•				
(Seychelles)	Seychelles		•			
(South Sudan)	South Sudan			•		
(Tanzania)	Tanzania	•				
(Uganda)	Uganda	•				
(Zambia)	Zambia	•				
(Zimbabwe)	Zimbabwe			•		
