= List of political parties in Central Asia by country =

This is a List of political parties in Central Asia by country, linking to the country list of parties and the political system of each country in the region.

== List of countries ==
	Country	Multi party	Two party	Dominant party	Single party	No party
(Kazakhstan)	Kazakhstan			•		
(Kyrgyzstan)	Kyrgyzstan	•				
(Tajikistan)	Tajikistan			•		
(Turkmenistan)	Turkmenistan			•		
(Uzbekistan)	Uzbekistan	•				
