= Larry Gerston =

American political scientist

Larry N. Gerston is an American political scientist, author, and media analyst. He is professor emeritus of Political Science at San José State University and is known for his expertise in American politics, public policy, and civic engagement. Gerston has authored over a dozen books on politics and policy, appears regularly as a political analyst on television and radio, and has written extensively for newspapers and magazines.

Increasingly, his work has centered on the importance of citizen participation as vital to preserving American democracy.

He serves as a political analyst for NBC Bay Area television, KCBS radio, NBC Nightly News, CBS Evening News, BBC, CNN, MSNBC, C-SPAN, and NPR.

== Education ==
Gerston received his Ph.D. (1975) and M.A. (1970) in Political Science from the University of California, Davis, and his A.B. from the University of California, Berkeley.

== Academic career ==
Gerston joined the faculty of San José State University in 1974, where he taught courses in American government, public policy, and political participation until his retirement as professor emeritus of Political Science. His scholarship focuses on the interplay between public policy and citizen engagement in a democratic society. Although he retired from San Jose State in 2014, he continues to write and teach.

Gerston has written more than 150 op-ed articles for newspapers, addressing issues ranging from local government reform to national democratic challenges. His commentary is often praised for his ability to make complex political issues accessible to the public.

He has also been interviewed on major news outlets including NBC Nightly News, CBS Evening News, BBC, CNN, MSNBC, C-SPAN, and NPR, and has been quoted in The New York Times, The Washington Post, The Wall Street Journal, Los Angeles Times, and other leading publications.

== Scholarly works ==
Gerston is the author of fifteen academic books on American politics and public policy. His forthcoming work, Overcoming Trumpism: How to Save American Democracy (Bloomsbury, expected March 2026), explains the origins and damage of Trumpism and proposes strategies for counteracting authoritarian populism to restore democratic institutions.

His recent publications include Trumpism, Bigotry, and the Threat to American Democracy (Lexington Books, 2023), California’s Recall Election of Gavin Newsom: The Politics of Political Reform in the Era of COVID (with Mary Currin-Percival and Garrick Percival, Taylor & Francis, 2022), and the third edition of Public Policy Making in a Democratic Society: A Guide to Civic Engagement (Taylor & Francis, 2022).

In Reviving Citizen Engagement: Policies to Renew National Community (Routledge, 2015), Gerston examines the growing social and political divisions in the United States, attributing them to racial discrimination, reduced educational opportunities, economic inequality, corporate influence, deteriorated institutions, and governmental inaction. He argues that the disengagement of a significant portion of the electorate jeopardizes democratic governance.

Gerston's applied research includes co-authoring the monograph Terrorism III: Assisting Public Transportation Operators in Responding to Chemical and Biological Threats (with Brian Michael Jenkins, Mineta Institute, 2001) and serving as principal writer of the Report of the 2002 Silicon Valley Blue Ribbon Task Force on Aviation Security and Technology.

Along with his scholarly publications, Gerston has written more than 150 op-ed columns for major newspapers, including The Philadelphia Inquirer, San Francisco Chronicle, Los Angeles Times, Sacramento Bee, and San Jose Mercury News. His commentaries address a wide range of issues, including presidential elections, state politics, public policy reform, and contemporary threats to American democracy.

== Other works ==
In addition to his academic and political writing, Gerston is a children's book author. His works include The Road to Hana (2016), which emphasizes the value of the journey over the destination; Spencer Spider Just Wants Friends (2019), addressing themes of discrimination; Spencer Spider Meets a Bully (2020), focusing on bullying; and Spencer Spider Helps a Friend (2022), which promotes self-esteem. His children's books have received several honors, including recognition as a finalist for the National Indie Excellence Award in 2019 and second place at the Pacific Rim Book Festival in 2016.

== Views and opinions ==
Gerston has been a vocal critic of Donald Trump, particularly regarding what he describes as Trump's “authoritarian tendencies” and “erosion of democratic norms.” In Trumpism, Bigotry, and the Threat to American Democracy (2023), he argues that Trump's presidency normalized misinformation, intolerance, and attacks on government institutions, presenting a profound threat to American democracy. He contends that Trump's rhetoric and policies have exacerbated social divisions and undermined public confidence in electoral integrity. Racism, religious intolerance, and misogyny are among the tools that have been employed used by Trump to divide American society.

Gerston has frequently commented on California and national politics, often emphasizing the challenges of governance in polarized environments. He has argued that increasing partisanship both in California and across the United States undermines the ability of elected officials to address pressing issues such as budget crises, immigration, climate change infrastructure needs, and social inequality.

== Selected publications ==
=== Academic books ===
- Gerston, Larry N. (April 16, 2026). Overcoming Trumpism: How to Save American Democracy. Bloomsbury Academic. ISBN 979-8765128176.
- Gerston, L.N. (2023), "Part IV: Trumpism, Bigotry, and the Threat to American Democracy", Trumpism, Bigotry, and the Threat to American Democracy, Lexington Books, pp. 247–280, doi:10.5771/9781666920888-247, ISBN 978-1-6669-2088-8
- "California's Recall Election of Gavin Newsom: COVID-19 and the Test of Leadership". Routledge & CRC Press.
- Gerston, L.N. (2022). Public policymaking in a democratic society: a guide to civic engagement (3rd ed.). New York London: Routledge, Taylor & Francis Group. ISBN 978-1-003-22927-8.
- Gerston, L.N; Currin-Percival, M.; Percival, G; Christensen, T (2021). California Politics and Government: A Practical Approach (15th ed.). Cengage Learning. ISBN 9780357139301.
- Gerston, Larry N. (2015). Reviving citizen engagement: policies to renew national community. Public administration and public policy. Boca Raton (Fla.): CRC Press. ISBN 978-1-4822-3176-2.
- Gerston, L.N. (2012). Not So Golden After All. CRC Press. doi:10.1201/b11782. ISBN 978-1-4398-8012-8.
- Gerston, L.N. (2015). Public policy making: process and principles (3rd ed.). London New York: Routledge, Taylor & Francis Group. ISBN 978-1-315-70138-7.
- Gerston, L.N. (2009). Confronting Reality: Ten Issues Threatening to Implode American Society (and How We Can Fix it) (1st ed.). Kendall/Hunt Publishing Co ,U.S. p. 264. ISBN 978-0757563867.
- Gerston, L.N. (2007). American federalism: a concise introduction. Armonk, N.Y: M.E. Sharpe. ISBN 978-0-7656-1671-5.
- Gerston, Larry N.; Christensen, Terry (2004). Recall! California's Political Earthquake. Florence: Taylor and Francis. ISBN 978-0-7656-1456-8.
- Christensen, Terry; Gerston, L.N. (1988). Politics in the Golden State: The California Connection. Scott, Foresman. ISBN 978-0-673-39713-3.
- Gerston, L.N.; Fraleigh, Cynthia; Schwab, Robert (1988). The Deregulated Society. Brooks/Cole Publishing Company. ISBN 978-0-534-08208-6.
- Gerston, L. N. (1983). Making public policy: from conflict to resolution. Glenview, Ill.: Scott, Foresman & Co. ISBN 978-0-673-15644-0.

=== Non-Academic Books ===
- Gerston, Larry N. (2019-06-15). Spencer Spider Just Wants Friends. Larry N. Gerston. ISBN 978-0-578-51187-0.
- Gerston, Larry N. (2020-11-20). Spencer Spider Meets a Bully. Primedia eLaunch LLC. ISBN 978-1-63625-890-4.
- Gerston, Larry N. (2019-06-15). Spencer Spider Just Wants Friends. Larry N. Gerston. ISBN 978-0-578-51187-0.
- Gerston, Larry N. (October 19, 2015). The Road to Hana. Llumina Kids. p. 52. ISBN 978-1625502551.
- Gerston, Larry (2003). Costco Experience. Open Road Integrated Media, Incorporated. ISBN 978-0-7592-5734-4.

=== Book Chapters ===
- Gerston, L. N.; Gerston Percival, G.; Currin-Percival, M. (2016). "Federal Power and States' Rights: Defining American Federalism". In Angerholzer III, Maxmillian (ed.). Triumphs and Tragedies of the Modern Presidency: Case Studies in Presidential Leadership (2 ed.). ABC-CLIO, LLC. doi:10.5040/9798216027638.ch-033. ISBN 979-8-216-02763-8.
- Gerston, L.N (2012). "Throwing Tea into the Pacific". In Miller, William J.; Walling, Jeremy D. (eds.). Tea party effects on 2010 U.S. Senate elections: stuck in the middle to lose. Lanham, Md: Lexington Books. ISBN 978-0-7391-6701-4.
- Gerston, L.N.; Christensen, T. (2008). "Initiatives as Catalysts for Racial Politics". In Cain, B.; Regalado, J.; Bass, S. (eds.). Racial and Ethnic Politics in California: Continuity and Change, vol. 3. University of California Press. ISBN 978-0877724285.
- Gerston, L.N (1998). "Far Pacific Policy Under the Second Clinton Administration: Opportunities and Obstacles". In Shuster, D.; Larmour, P.; Von Strokirch, K. (eds.). Leadership in the Pacific Islands: Tradition and the Future. National Centre for Development Studies, Research School of Pacific and Asian Studies, Australian National University. ISBN 978-0-7315-2372-6.

=== Articles ===
- "The Rise of Trumpism". Logos Journal.
- Rhee, J.; Oyamot, C.; Parent, D.; Speer, L.; Basu, A.; Gerston, L.N (2014). "A Case Study of a Co-Instructed Multidisciplinary Senior Capstone Project in Sustainability". Advances in Engineering Education. 4 (2).
- Gerston, L.N. "Immigration Policy in California: Conflict, Confluence, and Controversy". Mediterranean Quarterly.
- Gerston, L.N (2002). "Hands on" Politics: Nurturing the Democratic Dream, in Law Studies". Law Studies.

== Personal life ==
Gerston is married to Elisa Wolf Gerston. They have three children and six grandchildren.
