= List of political parties in Western Asia by country =

This is a List of political parties in Western Asia by country, linking to the country list of parties and the political system of each country in the region.

	Country	Multi party	Two party	Dominant party	Single party	No party
(Armenia)	Armenia			•		
(Azerbaijan)	Azerbaijan			•		
(Bahrain)	Bahrain	•				
(Cyprus)	Cyprus	•				
(Georgia (country))	Georgia		•			
(Iraq)	Iraq	•				
(Israel)	Israel	•				
(Jordan)	Jordan			•		
(Kuwait)	Kuwait					•
(Lebanon)	Lebanon	•				
(Oman)	Oman					•
(Palestine)	Palestine	•				
(Qatar)	Qatar					•
(Saudi Arabia)	Saudi Arabia					•
(Syria)	Syria	•				
(Turkey)	Turkey	•				
(United Arab Emirates)	United Arab Emirates					•
(Yemen)	Yemen			•		
