= List of political parties in Melanesia by country =

This is a List of political parties in Melanesia by country, linking to the country list of parties and the political system of each country in the region.

== List of countries ==
	Country	Multi party	Two party	Dominant party	Single party	No party
(Timor-Leste)	East Timor	•				
(Fiji)	Fiji	•				
(New Caledonia)	New Caledonia	•				
(Papua New Guinea)	Papua New Guinea	•				
(Solomon Islands)	Solomon Islands	•				
(Vanuatu)	Vanuatu	•				
	Torres Strait Islands	•				
