= Khmer Front Party =

- Leader: Suth Dina
- Founded: July 2003
- Ideology: Liberalism; Republicanism; Conservatism; Protectionism; Ultranationalism

Party flag

Website
- http://kfp.net.free.fr/

The leader called Sisowath Thomico had instead of creating a political party chose to create on Friday 28 July 2006 what was called the "Sampoan Sangkum Cheat Niyum (Alliance of the national community)." This was because when gathering some of the parties like the Khmer Unity Party and Angkor Empire Party etc. Thomico said ""We decided not to form the party yet since the alliance is not yet complete" which meant the Thomico was giving more time to other political parties to join the alliance and postpone the changing of the alliance into a new political party with a new name. However, later on it was finally changed into a political party called Sangkum Jatiniyum Front Party that is recognized in October by the Interior Ministry of Cambodia.

This political party was created in the year 2003 July. It generally seems to be in its orientation "liberty" and "Ultranationalist" e.g. by choosing to "defend the Khmer people" since it believes in defend "Khmer interests as a whole" and believes in a "democratic state of Cambodia”.

The Khmer Front Party also criticized the Cambodian government for getting government agents to follow the KFP's general secretary Mao Sam Oeun and KFP officials when the KFP said it was going to protest on a Saturday weekend that happened sometime during 2005 against the price of consumer goods and gas rising.
