= List of political parties in Palau =

Palau currently has no political parties. It is a de facto non-partisan democracy and no law prevents the formation of political parties. Political scientist Wouter Veenendaal states that "according to various sources the Palauan political environment is primarily determined by clan membership and inter- and intra-clan relationships, which according to Larry Gerston essentially assume the role of political parties".

The Palau Nationalist Party, which functioned mainly as an electoral vehicle as opposed to an ideological movement, was founded for the 1996 elections. It is believed to no longer exist.

The Ta Belau Party was formed in 1987, and likewise is not currently active. It supported the presidency of Lazarus Salii, who committed suicide while in office in 1988.

== See also ==
- Politics of Palau
- List of political parties by country
