= Khmer Democratic Party =

Khmer Democratic Party គណបក្សប្រជាធិបតេយ្យខ្មែរ
- Leader: Uk Phourik
- Founded: March 1998
- Political position: Centre-right
- National Assembly: 0 / 123
- Senate: 0 / 57

The Khmer Democratic Party (KDP) is a centre-right Cambodian political party founded in 1998.

== Political ideology ==
This political party supports the belief that, while immigrants are destructive to Cambodia, all immigrants are welcome as long as they are willing to contribute to Cambodian society. Other ideologies the Khmer Democratic Party promotes and supports are human-rights, particularly for women and children, free market economics, and being unbiased in foreign relations with other states. The party also believes that all citizens of the Cambodian state have the right to control a respective part of the state. The party believes in conservative values as well.

== Political activities ==
In the 2008 general elections, the KDP won a single seat with 32,386 votes.
