= Khmer Neutral Party =

Khmer Neutral Party គណបក្សខ្មែរអព្យាក្រឹត
- Abbreviation: KNP
- Leader: Bou Hel and Ty Chhin
- Founded: 1993
- Membership (1996): 20,000
- Ideology: Social democracy Factions: Democratic socialism Liberalism
- Political position: Centre to centre-left

The Khmer Neutral Party (Khmer: គណបក្សខ្មែរអព្យាក្រឹត) is a political party in Cambodia. It has its headquarters in Kampong Chhnang.

First participating in the 1993 Cambodian general election, winning 1.3% of the vote, the party believes in promoting a pluralistic political system, combining both right-wing and left-wing ideologies. It also supports liberalism and democracy, opposing absolutism and genocide.
