= Khmer Power Party =

Political party in Cambodia

Khmer Power Party គណបក្សអំណាចខ្មែរ
- President: Soung Sophorn
- Founded: 18 March 2010
- Succeeded by: Khmer Reform Party
- Headquarters: 244 St. 156, Sangkat Teuk L'ak II, Khan Tuol Kouk, Phnom Penh
- Ideology: Khmer ultranationalism Anti-communism; Republicanism
- Political position: Far-right
- Colors: Green
- Slogan: "Nation, Freedom, Hero"

Party flag

Website
- http://kppp.org

The Khmer Power Party (KPP; Khmer: គណបក្សអំណាចខ្មែរ) is a Cambodian pro-American political party founded on 18 March 2010 by Cambodian-American Sourn Serey Ratha. It did not officially register until March 2015. The party is in favor of abolishing the monarchy, and establish a second Khmer Republic government.

Serey Ratha was charged and put in jail in August 2016 for criticizing the government’s deployment of troops to the Laos border. He then received a royal pardon a year later But Sophorn refused to restore him as president but will give him a title of honorary president instead. Serey Ratha than threatened to file a complaint against Sophorn for allegedly forging public documents to secure the title of party president. Serey Ratha has also asked the Interior Minister to inspect a letter dated September 2017 allegedly forged by Sophorn to appoint himself as president without consent. Later both of them establish a new Party, Serey Ratha form Khmer Reform Party whiled Sophorn form Khmer Win Party. Both of them claim as the Successor of Khmer Power Party.

== See also ==
- Social Republican Party
