= 2001 Saint Lucian general election =

- 3 December 2001

All 17 seats in the House of Assembly 9 seats needed for a majority
- Turnout: 52.73% (▼13.32pp)
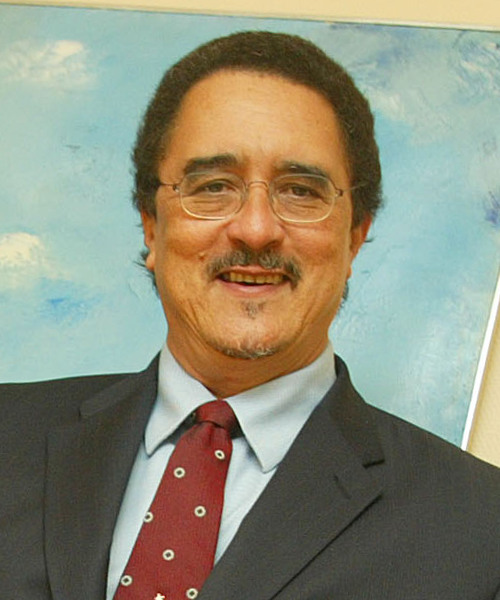

	First party	Second party
Leader	Kenny Anthony	Morella Joseph
Party	Labour Party	UWP
Last election	61.35%, 16 seats	36.58%, 1 seat
Seats won	14	3
Seat change	▼2	▲2
Popular vote	34,053	23,007
Percentage	56.01%	37.84%
Swing	▼5.34pp	▲1.26pp
- Results by constituency
Prime Minister before election
Kenny Anthony
Labour Party
Subsequent Prime Minister
Kenny Anthony
Labour Party

General elections were held in Saint Lucia on 3 December 2001. The result was a victory for the Saint Lucia Labour Party, which won fourteen of the seventeen seats. Voter turnout was 52.3%. This was the last election until 2025 in which the ruling party was re-elected.

== Results ==
Party	Votes	%	Seats	+/–
Saint Lucia Labour Party	34,053	56.01	14	–2
United Workers Party	23,007	37.84	3	+2
National Alliance	2,191	3.60	0	New
Sou Tout Apwe Fete Fini	231	0.38	0	New
Saint Lucia Freedom Party	18	0.03	0	New
Independents	1,295	2.13	0	0
Total	60,795	100.00	17	0
Valid votes	60,795	96.80		
Invalid/blank votes	2,010	3.20		
Total votes	62,805	100.00		
Registered voters/turnout	119,100	52.73		
Source: Caribbean Elections
