= Khmer Republican Party =

Khmer Republican Party គណបក្សខ្មែរសាធារណរដ្ឋ
- Leader: Lon Rith
- Founded: 2006
- Ideology: Liberalism; Conservatism; Democracy; Democratic capitalism
- Political position: Centre-right
- International affiliation: International Democrat Union (Observer)
- Colours: Blue

Party flag

Website
- http://www.khmerrepublicanparty.org/

The Khmer Republican Party (KRP) is political party created on 11 March 2006. It participated in the 27 July 2008 elections under the leadership of Lon Rith (son of Khmer Republic’s leader Lon Nol).

== Ideology ==
Although the party uses the word Republican in its name, the KRP's leader said they "will not make a Republic of Cambodia". However it does believe in a combination of ideologies from the right-wing, left-wing and liberals. It promotes ideas of protecting the constitution of the Kingdom of Cambodia and Cambodia's "national sovereignty" as well as Cambodian culture and religion.

It also promotes are creating jobs to improve "the living standards of the people" and improve the Cambodian economy, agriculture and industrial sector. Construct real democracy, promote and give hope to Cambodia's "workers in all types of factories, enterprises and companies" will assert their right to have "compensation according to their strengths and duties". They should get an "incentive bonus, hourly pay and other pay in line with international standards".

Khmer Republican Party claims to wish to protect "free market trade inside and outside" Cambodia. Apart from that it also requests freedom for the "press and religion" to express themselves.

== Activities ==
One of the most recent activities was where the KRP and its leader Lon Rith chose to participate in what was the 2008 July 27 parliamentary elections. It came in the 10th place in the election with 11,693 votes.

== Electoral history ==
Election	Total seats won	Total votes	Share of votes	Outcome of election		Election leader
2008	0 / 123	11,693	0.19%	0 seats	—	Lon Rith
2018	0 / 123	41,631	0.65%	0 seats	—	Lon Rith
