= List of political parties in South America by country =

This is a List of political parties in South America by country, linking to the country list of parties and the political system of each country in the region.

== List of countries ==
	Country	Multi party	Two party	Dominant party	Single party	No party
(Argentina)	Argentina	•				
(Bolivia)	Bolivia	•				
(Brazil)	Brazil	•				
(Chile)	Chile	•				
(Colombia)	Colombia	•				
(Ecuador)	Ecuador	•				
(Guyana)	Guyana		•			
(Paraguay)	Paraguay	•				
(Peru)	Peru	•				
(Suriname)	Suriname	•				
(Uruguay)	Uruguay	•				
(Venezuela)	Venezuela	•				

=== Dependencies ===
- Politics of the Falkland Islands
- List of political parties in French Guiana
- List of political parties in South Georgia and the South Sandwich Islands
