= Alliance of the National Community =

Political party

Khmer Unity Party Alliance of the National Community
- Leader: Khieu Rada
- Founded: 23 October 1997
- Ideology: Liberalism; Liberal democracy Nationalism
- National Assembly: 0 / 123
- Senate: 0 / 58

Website
- http://kup.free.fr/

The Alliance of the National Community (Sangkum Cheat Niyum) that represented four parties had all of its four parties merge and be transformed into a political party called the Sangkum Jatiniyum Front Party and one of them is the Khmer Unity Party.

The Khmer Unity Party, is a Cambodian opposition party founded in 1997 by its actual president Khieu Rada, who was previously part of the royalist FUNCINPEC party. It declares itself a "liberal, democratic and nationalist" party.

== SJFP KUP image gallery ==
Logo

Royal rider

2nd Royalist on horse logo

== See also ==
- Category:Alliance of the National Community politicians
