= Hang Dara Democratic Movement Party =

Hang Dara Democratic Movement Party គណបក្សហង្សដារ៉ាចលនាប្រជាធិបតេយ្យ
- Leader: Hang Dara
- Founded: May 2002
- Ideology: Monarchism

Party flag

The Hang Dara Democratic Movement Party (HDMP; Khmer: គណបក្សហង្សដារ៉ាចលនាប្រជាធិបតេយ្យ) is a Cambodian political party whose leader was Hang Dara. It was created in May 2002.

== Political ideologies ==
Here the HDMP believes in a variety of ideologies. With the right-wing it believes in protecting Cambodia's “National environment”, “sovereignty”, ”monarchy” and its “culture”. With its left-wing ideology it supports the improvement of people's livelihoods by constructing a newly improved healthcare system and educational sector with a huge priority on “building” more infrastructure in the Cambodian rural areas. Apart from that its liberal ideology is where the party will protect “human rights”, “democracy” and also free Cambodia from “tyrants” and “corrupt people”.
