= National Alliance (Saint Lucia) =

Political party in Saint Lucia

- Leader: George Odlum
- Founder: George Odlum; Sir John Compton; Morella Joseph
- Founded: 2001
- Dissolved: 2001

The National Alliance was a political party in the island of Saint Lucia led by George Odlum.

== History ==
The National Alliance was formed by George Odlum, Sir John Compton and Dr Morella Joseph. The launch of the party officially happened on DBS television show 'Talk' with Rick Wayne on March 28, 2001. At the time of formation, Odlum was Foreign Affairs Minister in the Saint Lucian government, but resigned to form the new party. The National Alliance worked closely with the United Workers Party and even adopted the UWP colors - red, green, gold and black. Co-founder Joseph retained her position as leader of the UWP, gained in 2000, despite her involvement with The National Alliance.

The National Alliance had nine candidates stand for the 2001 General Election. However, the party failed to win a single seat and received 2,191 votes (around 3.6%).

The party was beset by problems before the launch, and subsequently after the election between Odlum and Compton about who should lead the party, its direction and future. Joseph meanwhile left politics after failing to win her seat in the election, replaced as leader of the opposition by Marius Wilson for UWP.

== Electoral history ==
=== House of Assembly elections ===
Election	Party leader	Votes	%	Seats	+/–	Position	Government	Ref
2001	George Odlum	2,191	3.6%	0 / 17	Steady	▲3rd	St. Lucia Labour Party	
