= Society of Justice Party =

Political party in Cambodia

Society of Justice Party គណបក្សសង្គមយុត្តិធម៌
- Leader: Ban Sophal
- Founded: August 2006
- Ideology: Monarchism; Nationalism

Party flag

Website
- sangkumyutethorparty.org

Society of Justice Party is a political party in Cambodia, whose president is Ban Sophal.

== Political ideology ==
It believes in making the Cambodian people confident in their national currency, respecting Cambodia's constitution, believes in the monarchy and the king as a great nationalist and also following Cambodia's constitution it says he’s the symbol of national unity, independence and sovereignty.

The party believes that training for occupational and employment is necessary for both male and female Cambodians in response to the needs of both local and international labour markets. The SJP also believes that Cambodian workers and people need to be protected in other countries and in Cambodia.

It supports the freedom of the Cambodian people.
