= Table of political parties in Europe by pancontinental organisation =

The majority of major local or national political parties in Europe have aligned themselves with one of the European political alliances. Some of these are registered as European political parties, while others are political alliances with varying degrees of centralisation.

== History ==
The first European political parties formed during the 1970s, in the run-up to the first elections of the European Parliament by direct universal suffrage (adopted in 1976, and taking place for the first time in 1979). European political parties were first mentioned in the 1992 Treaty of Maastricht, stating that "Political parties at European level are important as a factor for integration within the Union. They contribute to forming a European awareness and to expressing the political will of the citizens of the Union", thus officially recognising the existence of European political parties.

Until the early 2000s, European parties remained mostly in the shadow of political groups in the European Parliament, which provided them with funding and, often, hosted them.

In November 2003, the European Parliament and the Council of the European Union adopted Regulation 2004/2003 "on the regulations governing political parties at European level and the rules regarding their funding". Regulation 2004/2003 provided the first official definition of European political parties and created a framework for their public funding. With this official definition, Regulation 2004/2003 marked the first distinction between European parties and other political alliances operating at European level.

In 2007, Regulation 1524/2007 updated modalities for the funding of European parties and allowed them to set up affiliated European political foundations, separate entities contributing to the debate on European issues, organising conferences, and carrying out research, and linking like-minded national political foundations. The revised Regulation explicitly allows European parties to finance campaigns conducted for elections to the European Parliament.

In October 2014, the European Parliament and the Council adopted Regulation 1141/2014, which replaced Regulation 2004/2003 and overhauled the framework for European political parties and foundations, including by giving them a European legal status. It also established the Authority for the European political parties and European political foundations (APPF), a standalone entity for the purpose of registering, controlling, and imposing sanctions on European parties and foundations.

In May 2018, the European Parliament and the Council adopted Regulation 2018/673, which amended Regulation 1141/2014 by detailing provisions relating to the registration of political parties and foundations, and transparency regarding political programmes and party logos.

== Political parties in Europe ==
Parties represented in national parliaments or the European Parliament are generally included in the below chart, while independents were omitted. Great ideological diversity can be found in most European political alliances, and individual country rows may not correspond with the heuristic left-right spectrum commonly used within its own political discourse.

	PEL	ELA	Stand- alone	EFA	EGP	PES	EDP	ALDE	Stand- alone	EPP	ECR	Patriots	Stand- alone
	Leftist	Green Left.	Leftist	Regionalist	Green	Social Dem.	Centre	Lib. Dem.	Centre Lib. Dem.	Centre-right	Conserv.	Right. Pop. National.	Rightist
Albania			LSI; PSD			PS†				PD†	PR†		
Andorra			Concòrdia			PS†		DA; L'A; Acció	CC				AE
Armenia			K՛O			ARF†		BA; ANC	KP FD; EPA; HP	HHK†; HE†	BHK		AM; ST; OEK
Austria	KPÖ			EL	GRÜNE	SPÖ		NEOS		ÖVP		FPÖ	STRONACH
Azerbaijan			VBP						MP VHP		AXC		YAP AVP
Belarus			KPB; APB								BPF		LDPB
Belgium			PTB-PVDA PC	N-VA	Groen; Ecolo	Vooruit; PS	LE; MCC	Open VLD; MR	UF; Vivant	CD&V; CSP		VB	Chez Nous
Bosnia and Herzegovina			SNSD; DF			SDP†		NS	NiP; NES	SDA†; HDZ†; PDP†; HDZ 1990†			SDS†; SZBiH SBB
Bulgaria			ABV	UMO	ZPB; Zelenite	BSP; BSDP†		DPS; NDSV		GERB; DSB; SDS; DP			Ataka; NFSB; VMRO Revival
Croatia	RF				Možemo! ORaH†	SDP	Reformisti	Centar; Fokus; HNS–LD†; HSLS†; GLAS†; IDS	HSS; HSU; PGS; NPS; RES	HDZ; HDS	MOST; DOMiNO; HS		DP HSP; PiP
Cyprus	AKEL†				KOP	EDEK	CA; Citizens' Platform	EDI	DIKO ΕΚ	DISY			
Czech Republic	KSČM† Levice			MZH	SZ	SOCDEM	SEN21		Piráti	TOP 09; KDU–ČSL	ODS	ANO 2011	SPD Trikolora; Svobodní Přísaha
Denmark		EL	ALT	SP	SF	SD		Venstre; RV	LA M	KF; K			DD DF
Estonia	EÜV				EER	SDE	EK	RE		IRL		EKRE	PÕLIS; EV
Finland		Vas		AF (Åland)	Vihr	SDP		Kesk; SFP		KOK; KD†	PS		
France	PCF	LFI	PCR; MIM; MRC PG	MRS (Savoy); EA (Basque Country); UDB (Brittany); PO (Occitania); PNC (Corsica)	EELV	PS	MoDem	MR; UDI	RE Agir LC PRG	LR	DLF	RN; UDR	RPF R!
Georgia			FG; FTP					Droa†; Girchi–MF; Lelo; FD†; Republican†; SA	Ahali	UNM†; EG†	SKP		GD; APG; Girchi; PP
Germany	DIE LINKE		BSW Tierschutzpartei DKP	BP; SSW	GRÜNE	SPD	FREIE WÄHLER	FDP	PIRATEN FAMILIE	CDU; CSU	WB		AfD NPD
Greece	SYRIZA		KKE DIMAR	Vinožito	OP	PASOK	EK		POTAMI	ND		FL	XA ANEL
Hungary	ISZOMM†		MKKP; MMP		LMP; P†	DK; MSZP	UK	Momentum; MLP		TISZA		Fidesz; KDNP	JOBBIK MHM
Iceland			VG			Samf		BF	FSF PP		SSF		
Ireland			SD SF PBP–S		GP	Labour	II	FF		FG			Aontú
Italy	PRC	SI	M5S	PPA & SSk (Friuli-Venezia Giulia); UV (Aosta Valley); STF (South Tyrol)	EV	PD; PSI	IV	RI +E; Azione; LDE	CD	FI; UdC; PATT (South Tyrol); SVP (South Tyrol)	FdI	League	NM FN
Kosovo						LVV†		PDK; AKR		LDK†; SL†			AAK; PD
Latvia				LKS†	LZP	SDPS†; LSDSP†			LZS LRA	V	NA	LPV	RP; NSL
Liechtenstein			FL										FBP VU
Lithuania						LSDP		LP; LRLS	DK; LVŽS	TS-LKD	AWPL		TT TTS
Luxembourg	Lénk				Gréng	LSAP		DP	PPLU	CSV	ADR		
Malta					AD+PD	PL	M			PN			
Moldova	PCRM					PDM†		PL	PLR	PLDM†; PPCD†			
Monaco									UPM				UND
Montenegro			SNP SD		URA	DPS; SDP		LP CG†	PES; DCG	BS†			DNP; NSD
Netherlands			SP PvdD	FNP	GL; Groenen	PvdA		VVD; D66	OSF	CDA	BBB	PVV	SGP; CU
Northern Cyprus	YKP†; BKP†		TDP			CTP†					UBP		DP
North Macedonia			BDI SPM			SDSM†		LPM; LDP	PDSh PDP	VMRO-DPNME†			NP
Norway		SV			MdG	Ap		Venstre	Sp	Høyre; KrF†			FrP
Poland		Razem		RAŚ	Zieloni	NL; UP	SD	.N	PL2050 UED	KO; PSL	PiS	RN	Kukiz'15 NN KKP
Portugal		BE	PCP		PEV; LIVRE PAN	PS		IL		MPT PSD; CDS		CHEGA	
Romania	PSR		SENS; Demos			PSD; PRO†		USR	FD; REPER; DREPT	PNL; UDMR PMP	AUR; AD		PNŢ-CD SOS RO; POT
Russia			KPRF SR:RPZ APR					Yabloko	YR				LDPR SPS; VR
San Marino			RETE PS			PSD†	RF		DML NS	PDCS†			
Serbia			SPS SDS PUPS	LSDV	ZLF	DS†; SSP†		PSG	NPS LDP; Nova–D2SP	SNS†; VMSZ†			DSS; POKS; Dveri; SPO; JS
Slovakia			Smer–SD			Hlas-SD		PS		KDH; S D Aliancia	SaS; OKS; NOVA		Republika SNS
Slovenia	Levica				Vesna	SD	DeSUS		GS	SDS; NSi; SLS			Resni.ca; SNS
Spain	IU; PCE; EUiA (Catalonia); Sortu† (Basque Country)	Podemos	MS	ERC (Catalan Countries); EA (Basque Country); BNG (Galicia); NC† (Canary Islands)	EQUO; Comuns† (Catalonia)	PSOE	EAJ (Basque Country); CC (Canary Islands); CxG (Galicia)	Cs	Junts	PP		Vox	SALF
Sweden		V	FI		MP	S		L C		M KD	SD		
Switzerland	PdA		CSP		Grüne	SP†		FDP	GLP	CVP; EVP			SVP BDP; EDU; LT
Turkey	Left Party					CHP†; HDP†			Good Party				AKP MHP
Ukraine			PPPU SPU KPU						PR VOB	NSNU†; NRU†			KUN
United Kingdom			SF (NI) PUP (NI)	SNP; PC; MK	GPEW; SGP; GPNI (NI)	Labour; SDLP (NI)		LibDems; Alliance (NI)			Cons; UUP (NI)		DUP (NI) TUV (NI) UKIP Reform UK

- Standalone parties with representation in the European Parliament are coloured by the parliamentary group in which they sit. These are:

EPP	S&D (PES)	RE	GUE/NGL	Greens-EFA	ECR	PfE	ESN	Non-Inscrits

- Standalone parties with representation in the Parliamentary Assembly of the Council of Europe (but not the European Parliament) are coloured by the parliamentary group in which they sit in the former. These are:

EPP	PES	ALDE
ECG	EUL	Non-Attached

- The "Standalone parties of the political centre" column includes some single-interest parties that claim to draw support from all across the spectrum.
- † indicates the party has observer or associate status within a transnational alliance.
- National parties are sorted by the alignment adopted by the party's leadership; in some cases MEPs have chosen to sit in different groups within the EP.
- The European political alliance Volt Europa is not shown in this table as it has national sections in several European countries; it is currently part of the Greens-European Free Alliance group in the European Parliament.

== See also ==
- European political party
- European political alliances
- European integration
- Politics of Europe
