= Song of the Paris Peace Agreement =

- National anthem of United Nations Administered Cambodia
- Music: Norodom Ranariddh
- Adopted: 28 February 1992
- Relinquished: 24 September 1993
- Succeeded by: Majestic Kingdom

The Song of the Paris Peace Agreement served as the national anthem of Cambodia between February 1992 and September 1993, when the country was administered by the United Nations. The anthem was composed by Prince Norodom Ranariddh and had no lyrics. It was replaced by Nokor Reach when the Cambodian monarchy was restored in September 1993. The first time the anthem was heard was on 20 October 1991 in a press conference before the Paris Peace Agreement was signed.

== See also ==
- Nokor Reach
- March of the Khmer Republic
- Dap Prampi Mesa Chokchey
- Anthem of the People’s Republic of Kampuchea
