= Flag of the United Nations =

United Nations
- Proportion: 2:3 or 3:5 (Note: Or using the same proportions of the national flag of whatever country it is being flown in, with the emblem being centred and one half of the hoist.)
- Adopted: 20 October 1947; 79 years ago
- Design: Sky blue banner with an all-white UN emblem (azimuthal equidistant projection surrounded by two olive branches) in the centre.
- Designed by: Donal McLaughlin (emblem only)

The flag of the United Nations is a sky blue banner containing the United Nations' emblem in the centre. The emblem on the flag is coloured white; it is a depiction of the world map in the azimuthal equidistant projection (centred on the North Pole and the International Date Line), surrounded by a pair of olive branches, a symbol of peace. The emblem was officially adopted on 7 December 1946, and the flag containing the emblem was officially adopted on 20 October 1947.

== Design ==
Emblem of the United Nations

The flag of the United Nations consists of the white emblem on the sky blue background. The emblem depicts a azimuthal equidistant projection of the world map, centred on the North Pole, with the globe being orientated to the International Date Line. The projection of the map extends to 60 degrees south latitude, and includes five concentric circles. The map is inscribed in a wreath consisting of crossed conventionalized branches of the olive tree.

The size of the emblem on the flag is one half the width of the flag itself. The flag proportions of the aspect ratio of the flag height to its width, are equal 2:3, 3:5 or to the same proportions as the national flag of any country in which the UN flag is flown. White and blue are the official colours of the United Nations. The light blue background colour code is Pantone Matching System 2925, with the hex code of #009EDB given. It approximates sky blue.

The olive branches are a symbol for peace, and the world map represents all the people and the countries of the world.

== History ==
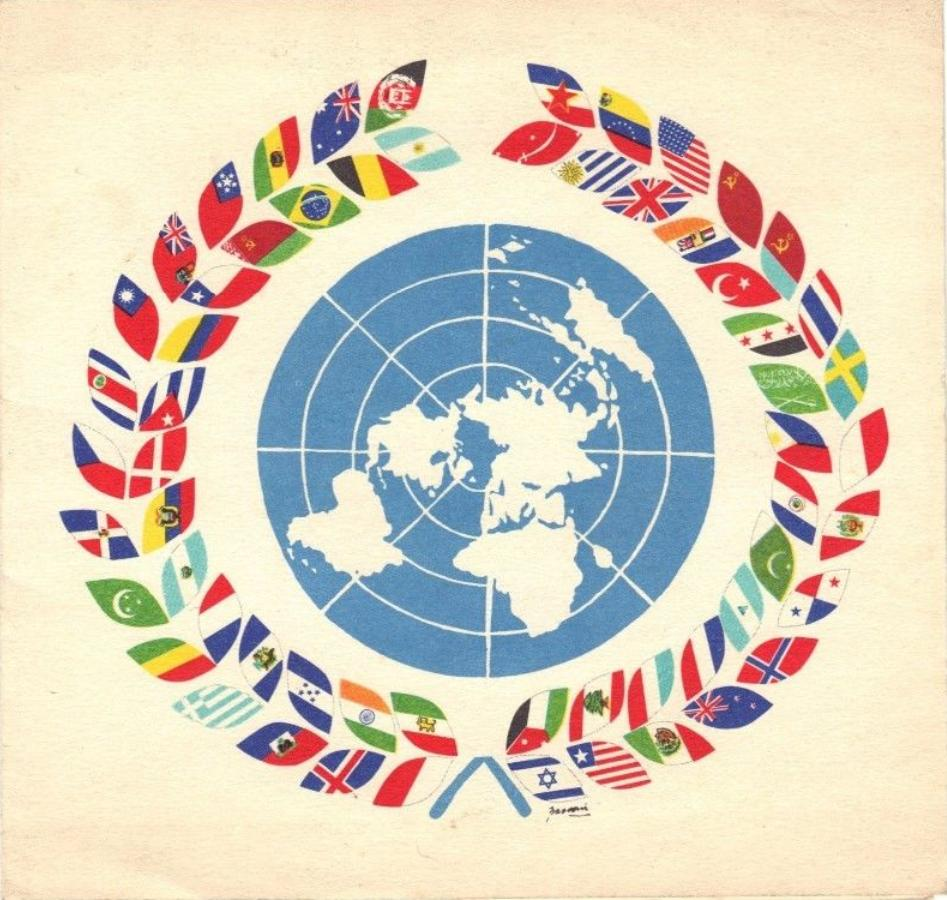
A card depicting flags as leaves of the emblem's branches, 1955

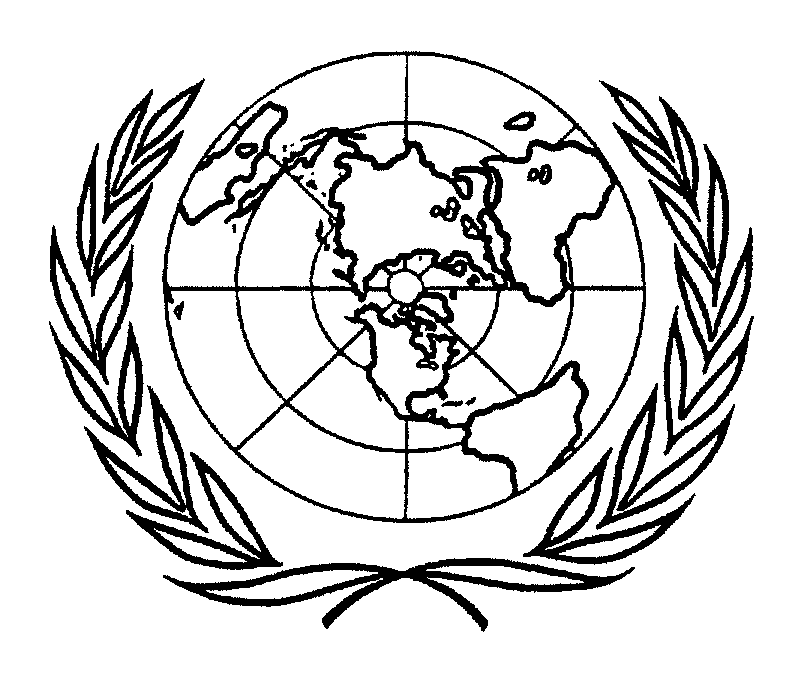
Insignia displayed on the cover of the United Nations Charter, from 26 June 1945, predating the official adoption of a flag of the United Nations. Notably, the lower, upright part of the globe is centred on 100° West, which places North America at prominence. Later versions of the United Nations insignia changes this to align closer to, and eventually at, the prime meridian (0° longitude).

The "United Nations Honour Flag", used as a symbol of the wartime allies, c. 1943–1948

The organizers of the 1945 United Nations Conference on International Organization in San Francisco, California, wanted an insignia that could be made into a pin to identify delegates. United States Secretary of State Edward Stettinius, Jr. was chairperson of the US delegation, and realized that a temporary design might become the permanent symbol of the United Nations. He formed a committee headed by Oliver Lundquist that developed a design consisting of a world map surrounded by leaves from a design created by Donal McLaughlin.

McLaughlin had previously worked as chief of graphics for the Office of Strategic Services that preceded the CIA. The azimuthal equidistant projection used in his design was heavily influenced by the maps created during World War II by Richard Edes Harrison, a popular cartographer working for Fortune and Life..

The blue that appears in the background of the insignia was chosen to be "the opposite of red, the war colour", although the exact shade has never been officially specified by the United Nations. The original colour the group chose in 1945 was a grey blue that differs from the current United Nations flag, unofficially called "Stettinius Blue", and it was selected because at that time it was not in use in any national flag. The globe used in the original design was an azimuthal projection focused on the North Pole with the United States, the host nation of the conference, at the centre. The projection that was used cut off portions of the Southern Hemisphere below 40 degrees south latitude, because that's where the Rand McNally map used as a model cut off, and the designers did not have time to find another map; this was considered acceptable because Argentina, Chile and New Zealand were not yet planned to be members of the United Nations. The projection was later altered so that the globe was centred on the International Date Line and extend to 60 degrees south. According to official explanations, the change was made to represent countries "as far as possible in their proper relationship to the cardinal points" and "so the east and west were in balance".

In 1946, a UNO committee was tasked to make a definite design, which was presented 2 December 1946. The emblem was adopted by the plenary session of the UNO on 7 December 1946, and the flag was officially adopted on 20 October 1947.

Between 1945 and 1946, the rotation of the globe projection was not always consistent. The cover of the United Nations Charter appears to be centred around the 100th meridian west (based on its alignment with Sri Lanka), while the emblem originally at the front of the General Assembly Hall appeared to be centred around the 110th meridian west (based on its alignment with Victoria Island and Baja California Sur).

A United Nations webpage gave the colour shade of the flag in terms of the Pantone Matching System as PMS 279; the current colour code of PMS 2925 was standardized in a UN branding guide in 2020.

== Use ==
According to the Convention on the Safety of United Nations and Associated Personnel, the emblem and the flag of the United Nations can be used by the personnel and material of UN peacekeeping missions as a protective sign to prevent attacks during an armed conflict.

The United Nations flag may also be flown as a garrison flag with other country flags. Garrison size is 10 feet by 30 feet.

== Derived flags ==
=== Agencies and organizations ===
Image	Entity abbrev.	Entity name	Image description
	IAEA	International Atomic Energy Agency	The IAEA has a flag with the same colours and olive branches as the United Nations. The central symbol is the Bohr model of the Beryllium-atom with four electrons. The IAEA is independent of but reporting to the United Nations.
	ICAO	International Civil Aviation Organization	Is that of the UN with pilot's wings superimposed.
	ILO	International Labour Organization	Is that of the UN, but replacing the map with an interrupted gear wheel with the letters "ILO" inside it.
	IMO	International Maritime Organization	Takes the UN flag, shrinks the map image and puts a chained cross of anchors behind it.
	ITU	International Telecommunication Union	Is UN blue with the organization's logo in white.
	UNESCO	United Nations Educational, Scientific and Cultural Organization	Has darker blue than UN flag; its symbol is a Greek temple (possibly the Parthenon), representing science, learning and culture. The six columns are made of the letters of the organization's name.
	UNICEF	United Nations Children's Fund	Has the leaves and globe of the UN flag but with a mother and child inlay instead of the world map.
	UNPA	United Nations Parliamentary Assembly (Proposed)	Is that of the UN with the map replaced by a six-segmented hemicycle.
	UPU	Universal Postal Union	Is UN blue with the organization's logo in white.
	WFP	World Food Programme	Has the olive leaves of the UN flag, with a hand clutching grains in the centre, in place of the globe. The white/blue colours of the UN flag are reversed in the WFP flag.
	WHO	World Health Organization	Identical to the UN flag, with a Rod of Asclepius, a traditional symbol of medicine, added.
	WMO	World Meteorological Organization	The flag is that of the UN with a compass rose and the letters "OMM/WMO" atop the globe.
	ICC	International Criminal Court	The flag of the ICC, though not an organ of the UN, resembles that of a UN agency.

=== National flags ===
The UN flag is the origin of a family of national flags. Because of the UN's association with peace and cooperation, UN-inspired flags are often adopted by states that have experienced conflict or instability. Many states with UN-inspired flags are either partly or entirely composed of former United Nations trust territories.

Image	Entity abbrev.	Description
	Bosnia and Herzegovina	The flag of Bosnia and Herzegovina was introduced by the UN High Representative Carlos Westendorp after the Parliament of Bosnia and Herzegovina could not agree on a common flag. The color scheme references the flag of Europe as much or more than the UN.
	Cambodia (1992–1993)	The flag of the United Nations Transitional Authority in Cambodia used the UN colours with a white map of Cambodia with the word for Cambodia in Khmer script.
	Cyprus	The flag of Cyprus uses a map and olive branches inspired by the UN flag.
	Eritrea (1952–1962)	The first flag of Eritrea used UN blue and olive branches.
	Eritrea (1993–present)	The current flag of Eritrea uses less UN blue but retains the olive branches.
	Federated States of Micronesia	The flag of the Federated States of Micronesia is derived from the former UN-inspired flag of the Trust Territory of the Pacific Islands, of which it was a part.
	Kosovo	The flag of Kosovo, was adopted 17 February 2008. Until then, Kosovo had been under the administration of the United Nations since 10 June 1999 and had used the UN flag for official purposes.
	Northern Mariana Islands	The flag of the Northern Mariana Islands is also derived from the former UN-inspired flag of the Trust Territory of the Pacific Islands, of which it was a part.
	Somalia (1954–present)	The flag of Somalia has UN blue and white, and was first used during the period of the United Nations Trust Territory of Somaliland.
	Trust Territory of the Pacific Islands	The flag of the Trust Territory of the Pacific Islands uses UN blue and was adopted during a period of UN-administered transition to independence.
	Turkmenistan	The Flag of Turkmenistan uses UN olive branches below the five carpet guls.

=== Subnational flags ===
The subnational flags, flags of constituent political entities of some states with UN-inspired flags, states that either were or were a part of United Nations trust territories, sometimes also derive inspiration from the flag of the United Nations.

Image	Entity	Description
	Kosrae	Kosrae is one of four constituent states of the Federated States of Micronesia. The flag of Kosrae features an azure field with white stars and laurel leaves.
	Pohnpei State	Pohnpei State is one of four constituent states of the Federated States of Micronesia. The flag of Pohnpei State features a blue field with white stars and a wreath of coconut leaves.
	Chuuk State	Chuuk State is one of four constituent states of the Federated States of Micronesia. The flag of Chuuk State features a blue field with a ring white stars surrounding a palm tree.
	Yap State	Yap State is one of four constituent states of the Federated States of Micronesia. The flag of Yap State features an azure field with a ring surrounding a traditional sailing canoe and voided circle with star, all in white.

=== Municipal flags ===
The municipal flags of constituent political entities of some states with UN-inspired flags, states that either were or were a part of United Nations trust territories, sometimes also derive inspiration from the flag of the United Nations.

Image	Entity	Description
	U, Federated States of Micronesia	U, Federated States of Micronesia, is one of six municipalities of Pohnpei State, Federated States of Micronesia. The flag of U features an azure field with five white stars and the pair of olive branches of the Flag of the United Nations.

=== Usage outside of the United Nations ===
- The UN flag is depicted in the background of former UN Secretary-General Dag Hammarskjöld on Sweden's 1,000 SEK banknote, the currency's highest denomination. The banknotes have been in circulation since October 2015.

== See also ==
- Flag of Earth
- Hymn to the United Nations
