= Dăm Thnăm =

Phum Toch Tmey ភូមិ តូចថ្មី
- Town
- Location within Cambodia
- Coordinates: 10°45′N 104°22′E
- Country: Cambodia
- Province: Kampot Province
- District: Dang Tong District

ភូមិ តូចថ្មី or phum toch tmey is a small town in Dang Tong District in Kampot Province, Cambodia. The National Highway 3 passes through the town in a northeast to southwest direction while the National Road 124 connects it to the north through Khum Srang several kilometres west of the town. The town lies along the National Highway 3 which connects it to the town of Chhuk to the north-east and Kampot on the Gulf of Thailand.
