= Flag of Cambodia =

Kingdom of Cambodia
- Use: National flag and ensign
- Proportion: 16:25 (ratio per the flag picture in law); 2:3 (proportion most commonly used)
- Adopted: 20 October 1948 (first use); 9 November 1953 (independence); 17 April 1975 (briefly by Khmer Rouge); 10 September 1990 (de jure readoption); 24 September 1993 (de facto readoption)
- Relinquished: 9 October 1970 (first time); 7 January 1976 (second time)
- Design: Three horizontal bands of blue, double-width red, and blue, with a depiction of Angkor Wat in white centred on the red band.

The flag of Cambodia (Khmer: ទង់ជាតិកម្ពុជា) features three horizontal bands of blue, double-width red, and blue, with a white depiction of Angkor Wat centred on the red band. Red and blue are traditionally the colours of Cambodia, representing the nation and the king respectively.

The flag in its present form was first adopted in 1948 and de facto readopted on 24 September 1993 following the 1993 Cambodian Constituent Assembly election and the restoration of the Cambodian monarchy. It is one of only four national flags in the world to feature a building, alongside those of Portugal, San Marino, and Spain.

== Description ==
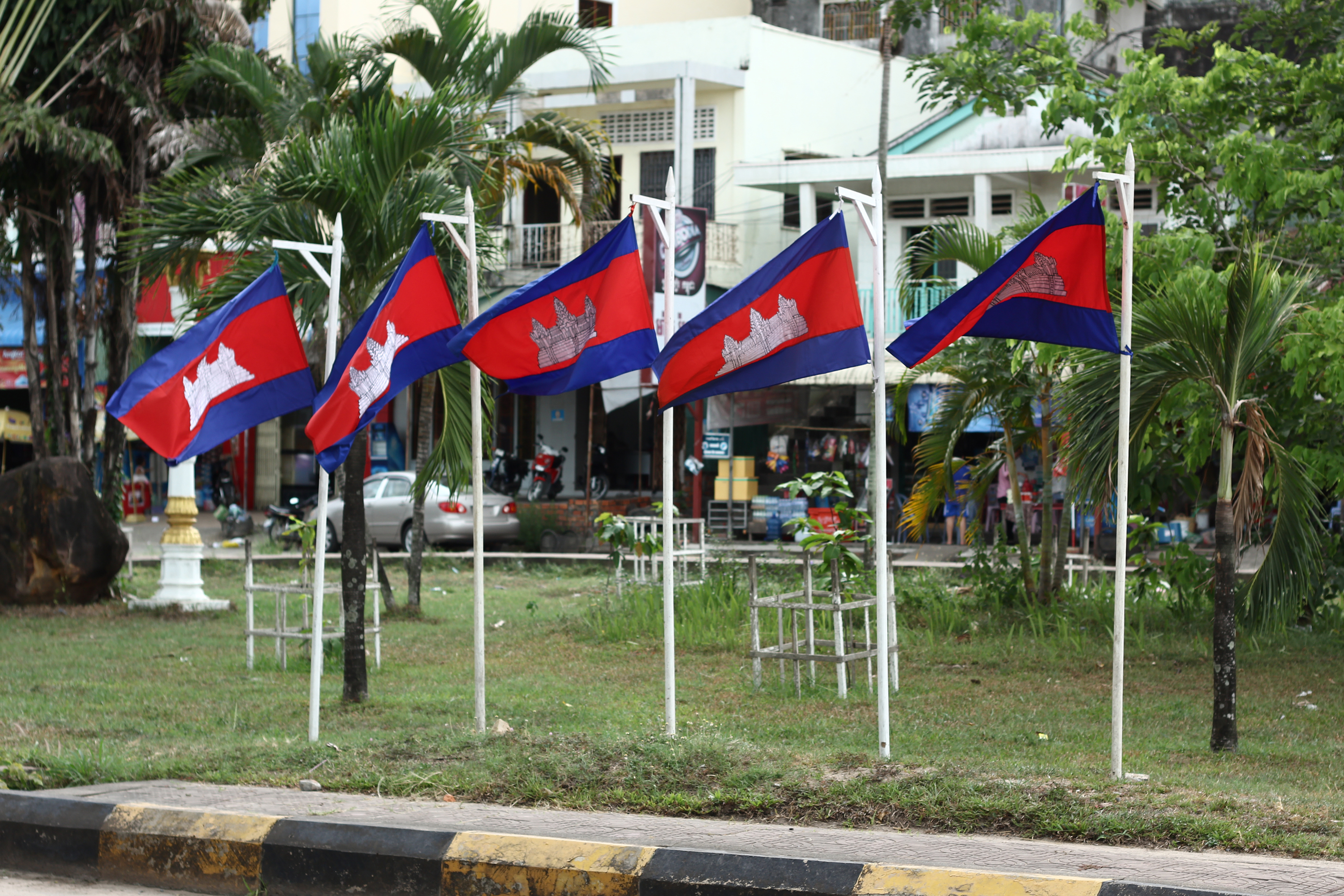
Cambodian flags

The flag of Cambodia features two bands of blue on the top and bottom, a double width red band in the middle, and a depiction of the Angkor Wat in white outlined in black centred on the red band. The flag in its present form was originally adopted in 1948 and readopted in 1993, after the Constituent Assembly election in 1993 and restoration of the Cambodian monarchy.

== Symbolism ==
Symbols	Meaning	People
Angkor Wat	Integrity, Justice and Heritage	Religion
Blue	Liberty, Cooperation and Brotherhood	King
Red	Bravery	Nation

== Royal standard ==
Royal Standard of the King of Cambodia
- Proportion: 16:25
- Adopted: 29 October 2004
- Design: The Royal Arms in gold centred on a blue field.

The Royal Standard of the King of Cambodia (Khmer: ទង់ព្រះមហាក្សត្រ, Tóng Preăh Môhaksâtr; "King's Flag") is the personal flag of Cambodian King Norodom Sihamoni. It is also considered among the National Symbols of Cambodia.

== History ==
Since around 1875, the Cambodian flag has featured a depiction of Angkor Wat in the centre. The current flag, with blue border stripes and a red central one (ratio 1:2:1 blue-red-blue) was adopted in 1948 after WWII, during a period of reforms and unrest in Cambodia due to French colonial rule. It was used until 9 October 1970, when a new flag was introduced for Lon Nol's Khmer Republic that lasted until the takeover of the Khmer Rouge in 1975. The subsequent state of Democratic Kampuchea (DK), which existed from 1975 to 1993, briefly used the 1948 Cambodian flag until it was replaced by a red flag with a three-towered Angkor Wat design rendered in yellow beginning in 1976; but despite the People's Republic of Kampuchea (PRK) established in 1979, after the Vietnamese invasion of Cambodia, the Democratic Kampuchea flag was retained internationally due to lack of recognition of the PRK.

The Kampuchean National United Front for National Salvation (FUNSK) revived the flag adopted by the Khmer Issarak in the days of anti-French resistance for the new state. This flag had the same colour pattern as the DK flag, but with a yellow five-towered Angkor Wat silhouette. When the PRK renamed itself as "State of Cambodia" (SOC) in 1989, the flag's lower half became blue. The United Nations Transitional Authority in Cambodia (UNTAC) flag was used during the 1992–1993 transitional period along with the flag of the SOC within Cambodia.

In 1990, the 1948 Cambodian flag was officially readopted, as affirmed after the monarchy was restored on 24 September 1993. The current Cambodian flag, together with the flags of Portugal, San Marino and Spain, are the only four state flags to feature a building. Red and blue are traditionally the colours of Cambodia.

The flag used today is the same as that established in 1948, although the older flag is sometimes said to have used a red outline for Angkor Wat while the current flag uses black specifically. Since that time, five other intervening designs have been used. Almost all made use of the image of the temple of Angkor Wat in one form or another. The monarchy was restored in September 1993, the 1948 flag having been readopted in June of that year.

== Historical national flags ==
Flag	Duration	Use	Colors scheme
	1863–1940 1940–1948	Flag of the Kingdom of Cambodia as a French protectorate (1863–1940, 1940–1948) as well as Kingdom of Kampuchea	Cambodia Cambodia / Blue / Red / White; RGB / 3-46-161 / 224-0-37 / 255-255-255; Hexadecimal / #032ea1 / #e00025 / #ffffff; CMYK / 98-71-0-37 / 0-100-83-12 / 0-0-0-0
	1948–1970 1975–1976	Flag of the Kingdom of Cambodia during the French protectorate (1948–1953) and after its independence from France (1953–1970) as well as Kampuchea (1975–1976)	Cambodia / Blue / Red / White; RGB / 3-46-161 / 224-0-37 / 255-255-255; Hexadecimal / #032ea1 / #e00025 / #ffffff; CMYK / 98-71-0-37 / 0-100-83-12 / 0-0-0-0
	1970–1975	Flag of the Khmer Republic.	Khmer Republic / Blue / Red / White; RGB / 3-46-161 / 224-0-37 / 255-255-255; Hexadecimal / #032ea1 / #e00025 / #ffffff; CMYK / 98-71-0-37 / 0-100-83-12 / 0-0-0-0
	1976–1990 1993–1998	Flag of Democratic Kampuchea (and of the Coalition Government of Democratic Kampuchea until 1990 and the Provisional Government of National Union and National Salvation of Cambodia until 1998)	Democratic Kampuchea / Red / Yellow; RGB / 218-18-26 / 252-221-9; Hexadecimal / #da121a / #fcdd09; CMYK / 0-92-88-15 / 0-12-96-1
	1979–1989	Flag of the People's Republic of Kampuchea	People's Republic of Kampuchea / Red / Yellow; RGB / 218-18-26 / 252-221-9; Hexadecimal / #da121a / #fcdd09; CMYK / 0-92-88-15 / 0-12-96-1
	1989–1992	Flag of the State of Cambodia.	State of Cambodia / Blue / Red / Yellow; RGB / 3-46-161 / 224-0-37 / 252-221-9; Hexadecimal / #032ea1 / #e00025 / #fcdd09; CMYK / 98-71-0-37 / 0-100-83-12 / 0-12-96-1
	1992–1993	Flag of United Nations Administered Cambodia (UNTAC)	Cambodia under UNTAC / Blue / White; RGB / 0-159-220 / 255-255-255; Hexadecimal / #009fdc / #ffffff; CMYK / 100-28-0-14 / 0-0-0-0
	1990–present	Flag of the National Government of Cambodia until 1993 and the Second Kingdom of Cambodia since the restoration of the monarchy in 1993.	Cambodia / Blue / Red / White; RGB / 3-46-161 / 224-0-37 / 255-255-255; Hexadecimal / #032ea1 / #e00025 / #ffffff; CMYK / 98-71-0-37 / 0-100-83-12 / 0-0-0-0

== See also ==
- List of flags of Cambodia
