= Barsedth District =

Barsedth បរសេដ្ឋ
- District
- Barsedth District ស្រុកបរសេដ្ឋ
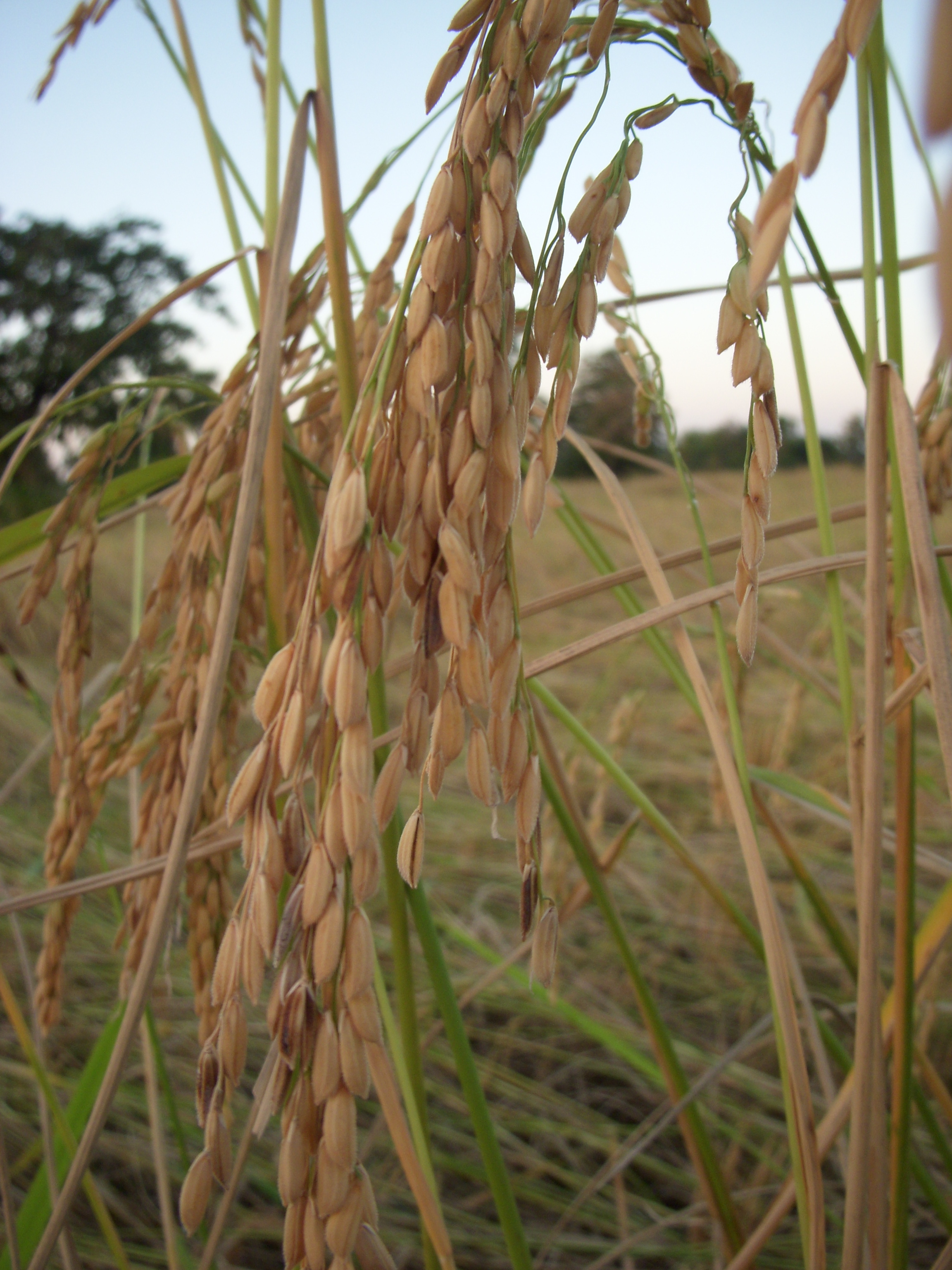
- With low lying land and access to irrigation, Basedth is a major rice growing district

- Location in Cambodia
- Coordinates: 11°12′N 104°35′E
- Country: Cambodia
- Province: Kampong Speu

Population (1998)
  - Total: 108,648
- Time zone: UTC+07:00 (ICT)
- Geocode: 0501

Barsedth (Khmer: បរសេដ្ឋ [ɓɑː.ˈsaet]) is a district (srok) in the south of Kampong Speu Province, in southern Cambodia. The district capital is the town of Barsedth located some 50 kilometres south of the provincial capital of Kampong Speu by road. The district shares a border with Kampot and Takeo provinces to the south. National Highway 3 forms the eastern district boundary. The district is made up of flat farmland and supports extensive agriculture and a large population.

The district has significant road infrastructure and National Highway 3 which runs from Phnom Penh to Veal Rinh runs along the eastern edge of the district from north to south. Borsedth District is one of the smaller districts in Kampong Speu province by land area but has one of the largest district populations in the province due to well irrigated land and good transport infrastructure. National Road 124 crosses the district, entering from the north and exiting in the south to join National Highway 3 further south in Dang Tong district of Kampot Province. Numerous smaller tertiary roads cross the district running either north to Kong Pisei and then to the provincial capital or east toward National Highway 3.

== Dam rehabilitation ==
Borsedth district is the site of a 2-year climate change project funded by the Global Environment Facility (GEF). The project will rehabilitate several dams in Borsedth and neighbouring Samraong district of Takeo. The dams are vital for rice production and water supply for families in the two districts. The total project cost over two years is 2.5 million U.S. dollars.

== Location ==
Borsedth district lies in the south of the province and shares a border with Kampot and Takeo provinces. Reading from the north clockwise, Basedth borders with Samraong Tong district to the north. To the north east is Kong Pisei district. The eastern border of the district is shared with Samraong District of Takeo province. To the south the district shares a border with Tram Kak district of Takeo. The western border of the district joins with Phnom Sruoch district of Kampong Speu.

== Administration ==
Borsedth District is subdivided into 15 communes (khum) and 218 villages (phum) The Basedth district governor reports to Korng Heang, the Governor of Kampong Speu. The following table shows the villages of Basedth district by commune.

| Khum (Commune) | Phum (Villages) |
|---|---|
| Borsedth | Preychertel, Preykoktrob, Preykley, Trapangchuk, Bangsangker, Bangtnong, Srae Traok, Tmat Leng, Sampoar, Chamkar Tuol, Prey Rumduol Khang Kaeut, Prey Rumduol Khang Tboung, Boeng Stok, Prey Rumduol Khang Lech, Prey Rumduol Khang Cheung, Tuol Khcheay, Khpob Veaeng, Kanlang, Chas, Trapeang Phong, Kromhun, Ta Prach |
| Kat Phluk | Kraol Krasang, Roka kaong, Prey Sampoar, Thlok Bei, Veal Lvieng, Youl Toung, Roka Thum, Phnum Koub, Chambak, Ou, Trapeang Peuk |
| Nitean | Dei Kraham, Trapeang Tuk, Tram Kang, Hangs, Trapeang Sdau, Trapeang Chhuk, Noreay, Trapeang Khyang, Trapeang Khnar, Trapeang Sala, Pou Tbaeng, Krasang Ta Kong, Trapeang Andoung, Trapeang Rumdenh, Serei Andaet |
| Pheakdei | Chrak Preal, Prey Rumdael, Prey Khla, Chhuk Roatn, Kouk Kandal, Sahakkom Khang Kaeut, Sahakkom Khang Lech, Ou Ta Pung, Ta Nok |
| Pheari Mean Chey | Preah Mlob, Thmei, Prey Kanhchan, Das Skor, Prey Ngoung, Pheari, Ta Thomm, Trapeang Phlong, Prey Roung, Ta Saom Ak, Samraong Pong Tuek, Sach Trei, Tuek Thla |
| Phong | Boeng Ta Mom, Tuol, Thmei, Sambour Meas, Kanlang Chum, Prey Monou, Trapeang Tuek Chrov, Trapeang Veaeng, Chhuk Kieb, Trapeang Lieb, Dambouk Khpos, Tuol Phngeas, Srae Roluos |
| Pou Angkrang | Trapeang Prei, Sangkom Mean chey, Trapeang Chhuk, Kandaol, Pou Thum, Pou Kandal, Prey Edth, Chranieng Chas, Chranieng Thmei, Prey Khla, Trapeang Kak, Serei Chuob Chum, Trakuon, Trapeang Trakiet, Kranhung, Serei Phoat, Prey Sroul, Noreay, Prey Ta Phem |
| Pou Chamraeun | Khley Chas, Khley Thmei, Trapeang Samraong, Sakkareak, Phnum Touch, Angk Ta Am, Srae Kuy, Trapeang Trayueng, Leang Chey Thmei, Trapeang Totuem, Leang Chey Chas, Prey Tbaeng, Prey Khlong, Khpob Run |
| Pou Mreal | Angk Daek Kandal, Chambak Run Khang Tboung, Srae Khnhaer, Chambak Run Khang Cheung, Mreal Thum, Mreal Tnaot Khang Cheung, Mreal Tnaot Khang Tboung, Ou Char, Pou, Salam, Trapeang Khnar, Rumdaoh Thmei, Chamraeun Phal, Ta Daeng Thmei, Ta Nuon, Ta Daeng Chas, Prey Tbaeng, Prey Khle |
| Svay Chacheb | Sdok, Popul, Chacheb, Chek, Anlong Leak, Ruessei Yul, Andoung Lvea, Char, Trapeang Khtum, Trapeang Thlok, Khnach Kantuot, Chrey, Pongro, Troyueng Ter, Sangkae Leak |
| Toul Ampil | Sangkream Bour, Roka Pok, Trapeang Chumrov, Trapeang Khyang, Prey Peay, Prey Khla, Angk Kdei, Trapeang Tonloab, Damnak Trach, Prey Sralaeng, Angk Rongeang, Mi Leav, Kae Sraeng, Phan, Ta Meun |
| Toul Sala | Tuol Sala, Ta Am, Kaoh Chheu Teal, Svay Rumpea, Doun Penh, Rumluek, Prey Rongeang, Pring, Ta Tov, Ou, Thlok, Srae Khle, Tnaot, Changriek, Veal, Khla Chol, Trapeang Kak |
| Kak | Ta Reach, Toap Mreak, Krang Traok, Trapeang Teab, Trapeang Krasang, Prey Chhnuol, Ruessei Veal, Kbal Thnal, Trapeang Pring, Trapeang Chhuk, Khnar, Cheung Phnum, Prech, Phchoek |
| Svay Rumpea | Tram Sasar, Kbier, Phsar Slab Leaeng, Ou Preal, Prey Dob, Slaeng, Trapeang Sya, Srae Pring, Thlok, Slab Leaeng, Kreul, Tuol, Khnar Ta Nong, Kandieng |
| Preah Khae | Tnaot Muoy daeum, Prey Ba Krong, Boeng, Trapeang Veaeng, Khnang Phum, Thnal dach, Thnal, Khlouk, Trapeang Prei |

== Demographics ==
According to the 1998 Census, the population of the district was 108,648 persons in 21,288 households in 1998. This population consisted of 51,175 males (47.1%) and 57,473 females (52.9%). With a population of over 100,000 people, Basedth has the second largest district population in Kampong Speu province. Only Samraong Tong is larger. The average household size in Basedth is 5.1 persons per household, which is slightly lower than the rural average for Cambodia (5.2 persons). The sex ratio in the district is 89.0%, with significantly more females than males.
