= Freedom Flag =

Freedom flag may refer to:

- The Freedom of Speech flag documenting the AACS encryption key controversy.
- Any number of national or institution flags, including:
  - The Flag of the United States
  - The Flag of South Vietnam
  - The French Tricolore
  - The LGBT movement Rainbow flag
  - The Four Freedoms Flag of the United Nations.
