= National Road 124 (Cambodia) =

Road in Cambodia

National Road 124 is a national road of Cambodia. The road starts roughly 25 kilometres (16 mi) east of Kampong Speu off National Highway 1, following on from National Road 51 in a southerly direction. At Khum Srang the road connects with National Road 125 which leads directly north-west to Kampong Speu.

The road continues south passing through Prey Chek District before joining National Highway 3 several kilometres west of Dam Thnam.
