= Kak Commune =

Kak Commune may refer to:

- Kak Commune, Basedth District, a commune in Basedth District, Cambodia
- Kak Commune, Bar Kaev District, a commune in Bar Kaev District, Cambodia
