= Nokor Reach =

National anthem of Cambodia

Song of the Royal Kingdom
English: Song of the Royal Kingdom
- បទនគររាជ
- National anthem of Cambodia
- Lyrics: Chuon Nath
- Music: Norodom Suramarit et al., 1938
- Adopted: 1941
- Readopted: 17 April 1975; 21 September 1993
- Relinquished: 9 October 1970; 6 January 1976
- Preceded by: March of the Khmer Republic (1975); Anthem of the People's Republic of Kampuchea (1993, partially recognized); Victorious Seventeenth of April (1993, internationally recognized)
- Succeeded by: March of the Khmer Republic (1970); Victorious Seventeenth of April (1976)

Audio sample
- Live rendition with choral vocals at the 2023 SEA Games (1st verse): file; help

Nokor Reach (Note: Khmer: បទនគររាជ, romanized: Bǎt Nôkô Riach, pronounced [ɓɑt̚ nɔkɔ́ː‿ɾiə̯c̚]) (lit. 'Song of the Royal Kingdom') is the national anthem of Cambodia. It is based on a Cambodian folk tune and was written by Chuon Nath.

== History ==
Nokor Reach originated from a folk poetry usually performed with chapei in ancient era for storytelling and to disclose any recent events.

The music of Nokor Reach was composed between 1938 and 1939 by Prince Norodom Suramarit during the reign of King Sisowath Monivong with help of J. Jekyll and François Perruchot, the Royal Palace's musical instructors. The lyrics were not finished until 20 July 1941 by Choun Nath, a few months after King Norodom Sihanouk's coronation. In the same year, it was adopted then reconfirmed in 1947 as a national anthem for the country.

In 1970, the monarchy was abolished by the Khmer Republic, thereby replacing the state's national anthem as well. After the communists' victory in 1975, former royalist symbols, including Nokor Reach, were reinstated for a short while. The Khmer Rouge then replaced it with "Glorious Seventeenth of April" in January 1976. After the royalist party FUNCINPEC defeated the former communists (Cambodian People's Party) in the 1993 elections, the royalist state anthem was restored.

== Lyrics ==
Instrumental rendition by the United States Navy Band (2 verses)

Nokor Reach is a poem consisting of three verses and each verse consists of five lines. The first verse is considered to be official and is usually performed at most official settings.

Khmer original

សូមពួកទេព្តា រក្សាមហាក្សត្រយើង
ឱ្យបានរុងរឿង ដោយជ័យមង្គលសិរីសួស្តី
យើងខ្ញុំព្រះអង្គ សូមជ្រកក្រោមម្លប់ព្រះបារមី
នៃព្រះនរបតីវង្ស ក្សត្រាដែលសាងប្រាសាទថ្ម
គ្រប់គ្រងដែនខ្មែរ បុរាណថ្កើងថ្កាន ។

ប្រាសាទសិលា កំបាំងកណ្តាលព្រៃ
គួរឱ្យស្រមៃ នឹកដល់យសស័ក្តិមហានគរ
ជាតិខ្មែរដូចថ្ម គង់វង្សនៅល្អរឹងប៉ឹងជំហរ
យើងសង្ឃឹមពរ ភ័ព្វព្រេងសំណាងរបស់កម្ពុជា
មហារដ្ឋកើតមាន យូរអង្វែងហើយ ។

គ្រប់វត្តអារាម ឮតែសូរស័ព្ទធម៌
សូត្រដោយអំណរ រំឭកគុណពុទ្ធសាសនា
ចូរយើងជាអ្នក ជឿជាក់ស្មោះស្ម័គ្រតាមបែបដូនតា
គង់តែទេវតា នឹងជួយជ្រោមជ្រែងផ្គត់ផ្គង់ប្រយោជន៍ឱ្យ
ដល់ប្រទេសខ្មែរ ជាមហានគរ ។

UNGEGN romanization

Som puak tepta, reăksa môhaksăt yoeng
Aoy ban rŏng rueang, daoy chĕi mǒngkǒl sĕrei suasdei
Yoeng khnhŏm preăh ǎng, som chrôk kraom mlǒp preăh barămei
Nĕi preăh nôrǒpădei wǒng, ksătra dael sang prasat thmâ
Krǒp krong daen Khmae, bŏran thkaoen thkan

Prasat sĕla, kǎmbăng kǎndal prĕi
Kua aoy srâmăi, noĕk dǎl yosăt môha nôkô
Chiat Khmae doch thmâ, kǒng wǒng noĕu l’â roĕng poĕng chǒmhâ
Yoeng sǎngkhoĕm pô, phoăp preng sǎmnang rôbǎh Kămpŭchia
Môha roăt kaoet mian, yu ǎngwaeng haoey

Krǒp woăt aram, lue tae sosap thoă
Sot daoy ǎmnâ, rǒmloĕk kŭn pŭtheăsasna
Cho yoeng chia neăk, chuea choăk smâh smăk tam baep donta
Kǒng tae teweăta, noĕng chuay chrom chrêng phkǎt phkǎng, prâyaoch aoy
Dǎl prâteh Khmae, chia môha nôkô

IPA transcription (Note: See Help:IPA/Khmer and Khmer language § Phonology.)

[sou̯m puə̯k̚ teːp̚.ɗaː ɾĕə̯k̚.saː‿m(ɔ).haːk̚.sat̚ jəːŋ]
[ʔao̯j ɓaːn ɾuŋ.ɾɨə̯ŋ ɗao̯j cɨj mĕə̯ŋ.kɔːl s(ə)ɾiː suə̯.sɗəj]
[jəːŋ kʰɲom pɾĕə̯h.ʔɑŋ sou̯m cɾɔːk̚ kɾao̯m‿m.lup̚ pɾĕə̯h ɓaː.ɾɔːʔ.məj]
[nɨj pɾĕə̯h nɔːɾ(u)p̚.p(ɑ)ɗəj ʋŭə̯ŋ kʰsat̚.tɾaː ɗae̯l saːŋ pɾaː.saːt̚ tʰmɑː]
[kɾup̚.kɾɔːŋ ɗae̯n kʰmae̯ ɓo.ɾaːn tʰkaə̯ŋ.tʰkaːn ‖]

[pɾaː.saːt̚ səj.laː kɑm.ɓaŋ kɑn.ɗaːl pɾɨj]
[kuə̯ ʔao̯j sɾɑ.maj nɨk̚ ɗɑl jŭə̯h.sak̚ m(ɔ.)haː.nɔ.kɔː]
[ciə̯t̚ kʰmae̯ ɗou̯c̚ tʰmɑː kɔŋ.ʋɔŋ nɨw‿l.ʔɑː ɾɨŋ.pəŋ cum.hɑː]
[jəːŋ sɑŋ.kʰɨm pɔː pʰŏə̯p̚ pɾeːŋ sɑm.naːŋ ɾ(ɔ.)ɓɑh kam.p(u.)ciə̯]
[m(ɔ)haː.ɾŏə̯t̚ kaə̯t̚ miə̯n juː ʔɑŋ.ʋaə̯ŋ haə̯j ‖]

[kɾup̚ ʋŏə̯t̚ ʔaː.ɾaːm lɨː tae̯ sou̯.sap̚ tʰɔə̯]
[sou̯t̚ ɗao̯j ʔɑm.nɑː ɾum.lɨk̚ kun put̚.tʰĕə̯ʔ.sah.snaː]
[cou̯ jəːŋ ciə̯ nĕə̯ʔ cɨə̯.cĕə̯ʔ smɑh.smak̚ taːm ɓae̯p̚ ɗou̯n.taː]
[kŭə̯ŋ tae̯ teːʋ(ə).ɗaː nɨŋ cuə̯j cɾoːm.cɾɛːŋ pʰkɔt̚.pʰkɔŋ pɾɑ.jao̯c̚ ʔao̯j]
[ɗɑl pɾɑ.teːh kʰmae̯ ciə̯‿m(ɔ).haː.nɔ.kɔː ‖]

English translation

May the Angels save our king
Granting him happiness and prosperity
We, his servants, wish to refuge under his completeness
Of sovereign's line, the ones being to build temples
Reigning over old Khmer's glorious land.

Temples of stone, hidden amid forests
Bethought of the mighty great kingdom triumphs
Khmer race stands tough and solid as eternal stone
We pray for the best upon Cambodia's destiny
A grand nation've ever occurred for.

Dharma risen, up from monasteries
Chant with joy, commemorate of Buddhism
Let us be faithful to our ancestors' belief
Assuredly, Angels will grant its bounty
Toward Khmer's, the grand nation.

Until the end of the French protectorate, a fourth verse praising the friendship between the Khmer and the French people was sung:

Khmer original

ក្នុងគ្រាក្សេមក្សាន្ត ដូចគ្រាមានចម្បាំង
កម្ពុជានិងបារាំង ជាមិត្តរួមចិត្តមួយ
យោធាក្លាហាន បានបង្ហូរឈាមដោយក្តីទុក្ខព្រួយ
គង់មានថ្ងៃមួយ និងមានជុំនេះដូចដើមវិញពុំខាន
ពួកខ្មែរនិងបាន ជួបជុំគ្នាវិញ

English translation

In peace and in battle
Cambodia was the friend of France
The blood of their heroes was not shed in vain
Because a day will dawn that will see the triumph
As well as the union of all Khmers

== See also ==
- March of the Khmer Republic
- Dap Prampi Mesa Chokchey
- Anthem of the People’s Republic of Kampuchea
- Song of the Paris Peace Agreement
- National symbols of Cambodia
- Angkor Wat
- Krama
