= March of the Khmer Republic =

National anthem of the Khmer Republic

Damnaeu ney Satheareanaroat Khmae
English: March of the Khmer Republic
- ដំណើរនៃសាធារណរដ្ឋខ្មែរ
- National anthem of the Khmer Republic
- Adopted: 9 October 1970
- Relinquished: 17 April 1975
- Preceded by: Majestic Kingdom
- Succeeded by: 1975: Majestic Kingdom; 1976: Victorious Seventeenth of April

"March of the Khmer Republic" (Khmer: ដំណើរនៃសាធារណរដ្ឋខ្មែរ, Damnaeu ney Satheareanaroat Khmae; French: La Marche de la République Khmère) was the national anthem of the Khmer Republic from 1970 to 1975. The song is often attributed to groups of students, led by Hang Thun Hak, at the Royal University of Fine Arts in Phnom Penh, but academic sources say it was written and composed by the Buddhist monk activist Khieu Chum, a student of Hem Chieu. The song was adopted as the national anthem of the newly founded Khmer Republic on 9 October 1970 after the overthrow of the monarchy. After the end of the Republic due to the Khmer Rouge victory in 1975, the song ceased to be the national anthem and was officially replaced in 1976 by the Khmer Rouge anthem "Victorious Seventeenth of April".

The "enemy" in the first line of the second stanza is a reference to the invasion of Cambodia by the North Vietnamese communists that began on 29 March 1970, just eighteen days after the coup, at the request of the Khmer Rouge's second in command, Nuon Chea, and had completely overrun the northeast of Cambodia by the time the Republic was declared that October.

== Lyrics ==
Khmer

ជនជាតិខ្មែរ ល្បីពូកែមួយក្នុងលោក
មានជ័យជោគ កសាងប្រាសាទសិលា
អរិយធម៌ ខ្ពស់បវរជាតិសាសនា
កេរ្តិ៍ដូនតាទុកលើភពផែនដី ។

ខ្មែរក្រោកឡើង
ខ្មែរក្រោកឡើង
ខ្មែរក្រោកឡើង
តស៊ូតម្កើងសាធារណរដ្ឋ

ខ្មាំងរំលោភ
ខ្មែរប្រយុទ្ធ មិនតក់ស្លុត
យកជ័យបំផុតជូនជាតិខេមរា
ឯករាជ្យភ្លឺថ្លាជាមហាប្រទេសតទៅ ។

UNGEGN transcription

Chônchéatĕ Khmêr lôpi pukê muŏy knŏng loŭk
Mean choăychoŭk kâsang prasat sĕléa
Ârĭyôthôrm khpsá bâvôr chéatĕ sasnéa
Ké donta tŭk leu phôpphên dei.

Khmêr kraôk laeung
Khmêr kraôk laeung
Khmêr kraôk laeung
Tâsu tâmkeung sathéarônârôdth

Khmămng rumloŭphd
Khmêr prâyŭtth mĭn tkáslŏt
Yôk choăy bâmphŏt chun chéatĕ Khémôréa
Êkâréachy phlœ thla chéa môha prâtésâ ttŏu.

French translation

Les Khmers sont des gens célèbres et habiles dans le monde
Sa victoire et son succès sont illustrés dans la construction des temples khmers
La culture, la nation et la religion sont les plus suprêmes et les plus importantes
L'héritage de nos ancêtres est conservé sur terre

Khmers, levez-vous !
Khmers, levez-vous !
Khmers, levez-vous !
Continuez à lutter pour glorifier la République!

Quand l'ennemi a envahi,
Les Khmers se battront, sans paniquer,
Apportez la victoire ultime à la nation khmère
Le brillant indépendant fera à nouveau la gloire du Cambodge !

English translation

Khmers are famous and skilful people in the world,
Their victories and success are shown in the building of stone temples,
Culture, nation, and religion are the most supreme and important,
The heritage of our ancestors are kept on earth.

Arise, ye Khmer people!
Arise, ye Khmer people!
Arise, ye Khmer people!
We must fight to preserve the Republic!

When the enemy invades,
The Khmers people will fight without panicking,
And bring the ultimate victory to the Khmer nation,
Bright independence will shine and Cambodia will be a great nation.
