= Donal McLaughlin =

American architect (1907 - 2009)

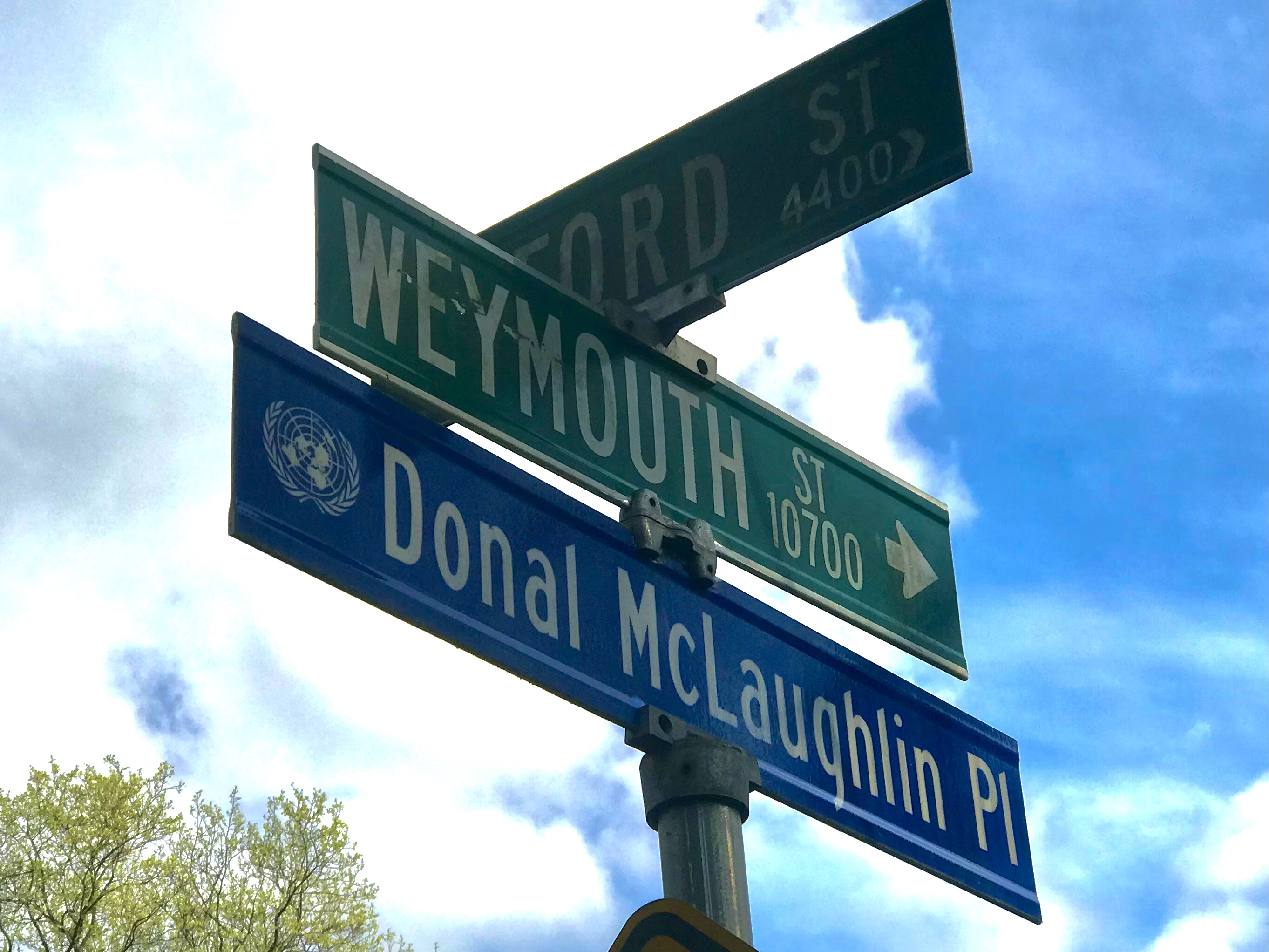
Donal McLaughlin Place street sign in Maryland

Donal McLaughlin (July 26, 1907 – September 27, 2009) was an American architect who played a major role in the design of the flag of the United Nations.

== Early life and education ==
McLaughlin was born on July 26, 1907, in Manhattan and was raised in the Bronx. His choice to pursue architecture mirrored that of his grandfather, James W. McLaughlin, who designed the Cincinnati Art Museum. McLaughlin attended Yale University, where his thesis addressed the issues of circular design. He graduated with a Bachelor of Architecture degree in 1933 from the Yale School of Architecture. He earned an architecture diploma from the Beaux-Arts Institute of Design in 1937.

== Career ==
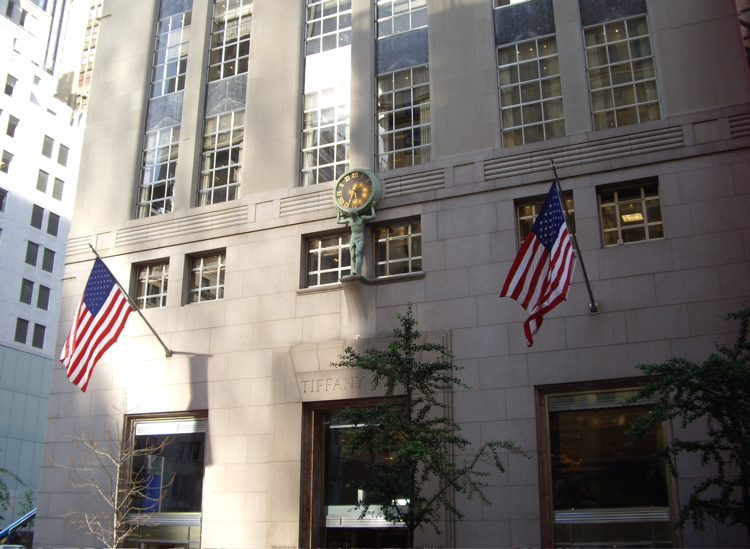
Tiffany & Co. flagship store

After his graduation, despite the difficult economic climate of the Great Depression, he was able to get a position with the National Park Service in Washington, DC. That led to positions in New York City with the industrial design firm of Raymond Loewy and Walter Dorwin Teague, where he worked on the Eastman Kodak and U.S. Steel pavilions at the 1939 New York World's Fair in New York. He also designed the interior of the Tiffany & Co. flagship store at Fifth Avenue and 57th Street in Manhattan.

During World War II, McLaughlin worked for the Office of Strategic Services, where he worked for its leader, "Wild Bill" Donovan as chief of graphics. During the war, his group used visual design to help present information that could be easily understood—including army orientation films, a documentary on the capabilities of amphibious DUKW vehicles, and cigarette packages printed with instructions for derailing German trains. His team created the design for the courtroom used in the Nuremberg Trials as well as the visual displays that were used by the prosecution that helped obtain convictions of Nazi war criminals.

=== United Nations insignia ===
Emblem of the United Nations

The organizers of the 1945 United Nations Conference on International Organization in San Francisco, California, wanted an insignia that could be made into a pin to identify delegates that could also be used as a logo for the international event. U.S. Secretary of State Edward Stettinius Jr., was chairman of the U.S. delegation and realized that a temporary design might become the permanent symbol of the United Nations. He formed a committee, headed by Oliver Lundquist, to develop a design with a world map surrounded by leaves from a design that had been created by McLaughlin. With his fellow designers, McLaughlin came up with about nine different designs. The one that they chose had to fit on a circular pin that was 1 1/16 in. in diameter, and McLaughlin referred to his thesis by shifting the projection off center so that all of the countries would fit. The continents were surrounded by olive branches to represent peace with the name, location, and date of the conference on the outer edge.

McLaughlin celebrated his 100th birthday on July 26, 2007. His father also reached the century mark, and the elder McLaughlin remarked that he had given up smoking cigarettes and drinking in his early thirties and credited his longevity to having "never exerted myself with too much work or ambition."

== Death ==
McLaughlin died on September 27, 2009, at the age of 102 in his home in Garrett Park, Maryland due to esophageal cancer. He was survived by two daughters, a son, six grandchildren and three great-grandchildren. He married the former Laura Nevius in 1937, who died in 1998.
