= List of flags of Cambodia =

This list describes the evolution of Cambodian flags, as well as other flags used within Cambodia and Governmental agencies.

== State flags ==
=== National ===
Flag	Duration	Usage	Description
	1948–1970; 1993–present	Flag of the Kingdom of Cambodia	Three horizontal bands of blue, red, and blue and a depiction of Angkor Wat in white with black outlining.

==== Ceremonial ====
Flag	Duration	Usage	Description
	1948–1970; 1993–present	Ceremonial flag of Cambodia	Three vertical bands of blue, red, and blue and a depiction of Angkor Wat in white with black outlining.

== Government ==
Flag	Duration	Usage	Description
	1993–present	Flag of the Parliament of Cambodia	A blue field with the emblem of the Cambodian Parliament in gold.
	1993–present	Flag of the Customs of Cambodia	A blue field with the emblem of the Customs of Cambodia.

== Royal standard ==
Flag	Duration	Usage	Description
	1863–1970	Flag of the King of Cambodia	A blue field surrounded by a red border with elements of the Royal arms of Cambodia in gold.
	1993–present	Flag of the King of Cambodia	A blue field with the emblem of the Royal arms of Cambodia in gold.

== Military ==
Flag	Duration	Usage	Description
	–present	Flag of the Royal Cambodian Armed Forces	A red field with the emblem of the Armed Forces.
	–present	Flag of the Royal Cambodian Army	
	–present	Flag of the Royal Cambodian Navy	
	–present	Flag of the Royal Cambodian Air Force	A dark blue field with the emblem of the air force in the center and the emblem of the Armed Forces in the canton.
	–present	Flag of the Royal Cambodian Gendarmerie	A dark blue field with the Emblem of the gendarmerie.

== Historical flags ==
=== National ===
Flag	Duration	Usage	Description
	802–1863	Alleged flag of the Khmer Empire and Cambodia	A yellow pennant with green fringe. The claim that this flag existed is dubious and questioned.
	1863–1940	Flag of the French Protectorate of Cambodia	A red field surrounded by a blue border with a depiction of the Royal Palace in white.
	1940–1948	Flag of the French Protectorate of Cambodia as well as the Kingdom of Kampuchea (1945)	A red field surrounded by a blue border with a depiction of the Angkor Wat in white.
	1948–1970; 1975–1976	Flag of Cambodia during French Protectorate (1948–1953) and after its independence from France (1953–1970) as well as Kampuchea (1975–1976)	Three horizontal bands of blue, red, and blue and a depiction of Angkor Wat in white.
	1941–1945	Flag of Cambodia under Japanese occupation	A red flag with a square formed by thin white lines which has small white squares centered at each corner and another in the center. The claim that this flag existed is dubious and questioned.
	1970–1975	Flag of the Khmer Republic	A blue field with a red canton with a depiction of Angkor Wat in white with either black or red outlining and three stars in the upper fly.
	1975–1990	Flag of Democratic Kampuchea and the Coalition Government of Democratic Kampuchea	A red field with a simplified depiction of Angkor Wat in yellow. Also used by the internationally recognized Coalition Government of Democratic Kampuchea.
	1979–1989	Flag of the People's Republic of Kampuchea	A red field with a simplified depiction of Angkor Wat in yellow, with five towers instead of three.
	1989–1992	Flag of the State of Cambodia	Two horizontal bands of red and blue with either the simplified depiction or a new five tower depiction of Angkor Wat in yellow.
	1992–1993	Flag of United Nations Administered Cambodia	A United Nations blue field with a map of Cambodia in white and the Khmer word for Cambodia in blue.
	1990–present (de jure); 1993–present (de facto)	Flag of the National Government of Cambodia and the Kingdom of Cambodia	Three horizontal bands of blue, red, and blue and a depiction of Angkor Wat in white with black outlining.

=== Military flags ===
Flag	Duration	Usage	Description
	1958	Flag of the Chief of Naval Staff	A white field with a swallowtail cut on the fly side and the flag of Cambodia as the canton.

== Other flags ==
Flag	Duration	Usage	Description
	?	Flag of the Khmer Loeu ethnic group (unofficial)	The flag representing the Khmer Loeu (Mountain Khmer) ethnic groups.
