= Chuon Nath =

Cambodian monk and national hero (1883–1969)

His Holiness Samdech Sangha Rāja Jhotañāno Chuon Nath
- ជួន ណាត
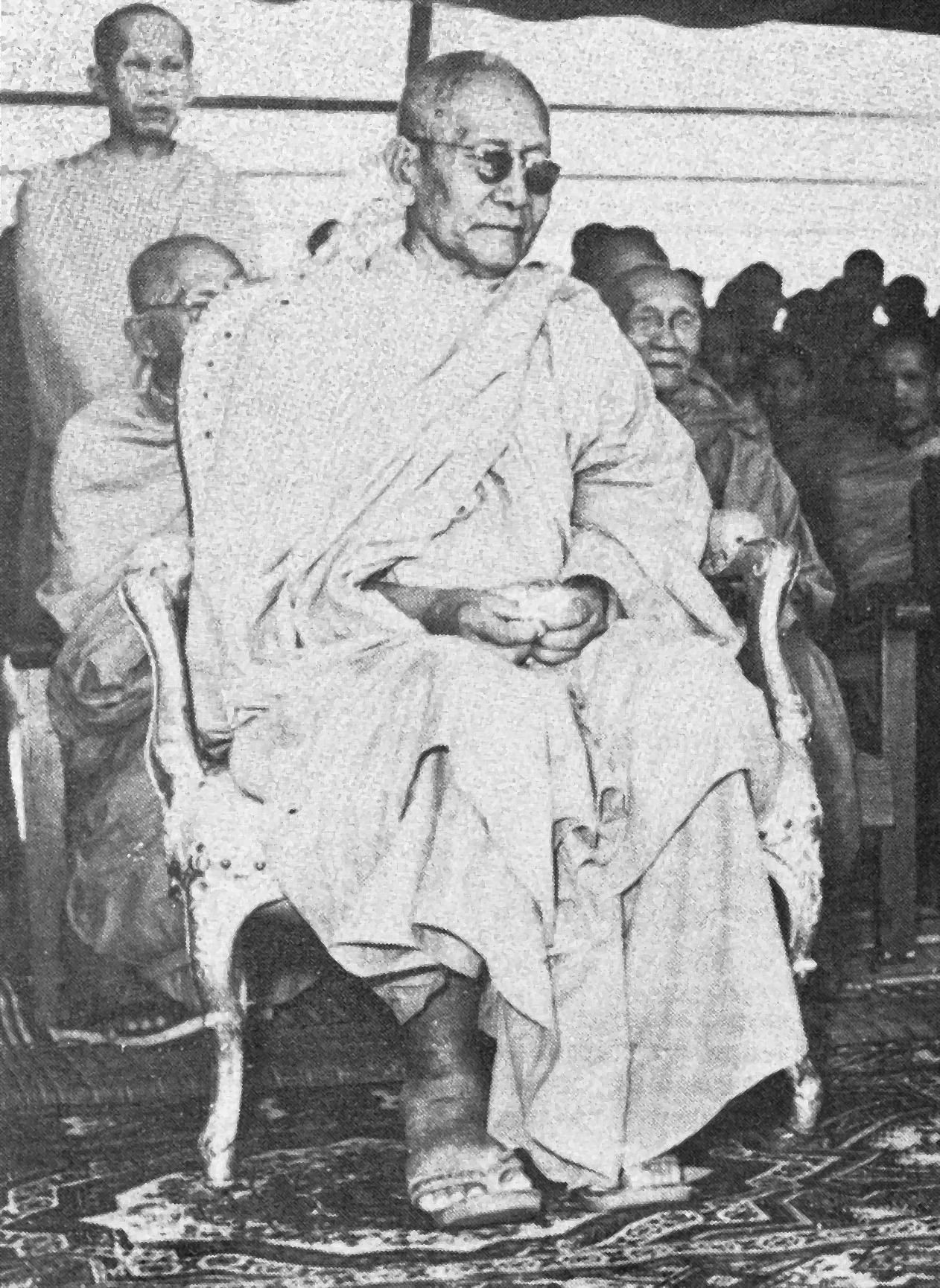
- Nath in 1961
- Born: 13 March 1883; Kong Pisei, Kampong Speu, French Cambodia
- Died: 25 September 1969 (aged 86); Phnom Penh, Cambodia
- Education: Royal Khmer University
- Occupations: Monk; author; composer; poet
- Years active: 1902–1969
- Religion: Theravada Buddhism
- Writings: Khmer Dictionary; Nokor Reach; Pongsavotar Khmer

Chuon Nath (Khmer: ជួន ណាត; 11 March 1883 – 25 September 1969) was a Cambodian monk and the late Gana Mahanikaya Supreme Patriarch of Cambodia. Amongst his achievements is his effort in conservation of the Khmer language in the form of the Khmer dictionary. His protection of Khmer identity and history in the form of patriotic songs "Bât Nôkôr Réach" and "Pongsavotar Khmer" were also among his contributions to the country. His ashes were interred at Wat Ounalom in Phnom Penh. His full honorary title is Samdech Sangha Rāja Jhotañāno Chuon Nath (Khmer: សម្តេចព្រះសង្ឃរាជ ជួន ណាត ជោតញ្ញាណោ)

== Early life and education ==
Nath was born in Kampong Speu Province to a family of farmers.

At age 12, Nath was brought to the temple to learn, as was typical for Khmer boys at the time. He became a novice monk in 1897 and was fully ordained in 1904 at the age of 21.

In 1913, Nath sat the Pali exam for monks, earning the highest score among the test-takers for that year. He passed the second exam two years later and was appointed professor at the Senior Pali High School (now the Preah Soramrith Buddhist High School) in Phnom Penh.

In 1922, he and another monk, Huot Tat, were invited by Louis Finot to study Sanskrit at the École française d’Extrême-Orient in Hanoi, French Indochina.

== Conserving the Khmer language ==
Nath was the head of a reformist movement in the Khmer Buddhist Sangha which developed a rationalist-scholastic model of Buddhism, rooted in linguistic studies of the Pali Canon. This new movement, known as Dhammayuttika Nikaya, influenced young Khmer monks in the early 20th century. The new movement also cultivated Khmer-language identity and culture, giving rise to the notion of Cambodian nationalism.

Nath pushed for a series of innovations in the Khmer Sangha beginning in the early twentieth century: the use of print for sacred texts (rather than traditional methods of hand-inscribing palm-leaf manuscripts); a higher degree of expertise in Pali and Sanskrit studies among monks; a vision of orthodoxy based on teaching of Vinaya texts for both monks and lay-people; and modernization of teaching methods for Buddhist studies. He also oversaw the translation of the entire Buddhist Pali canon into Khmer language; and the creation of the first modern Khmer language dictionary.

The French set up its protectorate over Cambodia and intended to replace the Khmer language with its own through the so-called "pseudo-French intellectuals." This intention rallied many Cambodian scholars to the course of conserving the Khmer language; one such scholar was Nath. Nath dedicated his life to upholding Buddhism and the conservation of Khmer language in the country that was highly influenced by French colonialism. He had an extensive knowledge of the Khmer language. He was probably the most famous and most knowledgeable monk Cambodia had ever had. A master in Buddha’s teaching, he was very well known around the Buddhism circle as well as very adept at languages. Throughout his life, he encouraged the use of "Khmerization" in both public education and religions. What Nath meant by "Khmerization" was he wanted to derive new Khmer words from its ancestral roots, the Pali and Sanskrit languages. For example, when the train arrived first in Cambodia, there was no Khmer word for the train. Nath thus derived the word for train from Sanskrit and Pali word of Ayomoyo which means something that is made of metal. Together with the word Yana which means vehicle, came the Khmer word for train which we know today as Ayaksmeyana (អយស្ម័យយាន), pronounced Ayak-smey-yean.

However, Nath's Khmerization was not overall accepted by all Khmers. Scholars such as Keng Vannsak who were pro-French did not find the kind of Khmer words derived from Pali and Sanskrit to be convenient. They revolutionized another kind of derivation which they want to adopt normalized French word into Khmer vocabulary. The only major change was to use Khmer alphabet to write the word rather than using the Roman alphabets used by the French. But despite opposition, Nath's Khmerization succeeded. He was a member of the original committee granted royal order to compile a Khmer dictionary in 1915 and was credited as the founder of the dictionary as he pushed for and finally succeeded in printing the first edition of the current Khmer dictionary in 1938. In 1967, he was elevated to the rank of doctor.

Nath's other contribution to Cambodia include the current national anthem, "Bât Nôkôr Réach", for which he composed both music and lyrics. "Nokor Reach" was written to correspond to the motto of the nation, "Nation, Religion, King" as well as demonstrate the grandeur and the mighty past of the Khmer nation.

== See also ==
- Preah Maha Ghosananda

== Bibliography ==
- Harris, Ian (2005). Cambodian Buddhism: History and Practice (PDF) (10 ed.). Honolulu, Hawaii: University of Hawaii Press. ISBN 0824827651. Archived from the original (PDF) on March 16, 2015.
- Trinh Hoanh, “Biography of Samdech Preah Sanghareach Gana Mahanikay Chuon Nat,” trans. Phlong Pisith, in Bulletin of the Students of the Department of Archaeology, no. 3 (July 2004): 18. 112.
- Harris, Ian (1999). "Chapter 3. Buddhism in Extremis: The Case of Cambodia". In Harris, Ian (ed.). Buddhism and Politics in Twentieth Century Asia. London: Pinter. ISBN 0826451780.
- Buddhasāsanapaṇḍity (1970). Biography of Samdech Preah Sanghareach Chuon-Nath, the Chief of Mahanikava Order (7 of Série de culture et civilisation khmères ed.). Phnom Penh, Cambodia: Institut bouddhique.
