= National Road 51 (Cambodia) =

Road in Cambodia

National Road 51 is a national road of Cambodia. It joins the National Highway 5 at Oudong (Odongk) and runs south through Bat Doeng and bypasses National Highway 4 before joining National Road 124 and National Road 127.

The road was built by the China Road and Bridge Corporation.
