= Anthem of the People's Republic of Kampuchea =

Former national anthem of Cambodia (1979–1993)

Bâtchâmrieng nei Sathéarônârôdth Brâchéaméanit Kâmpŭchéa
English: Anthem of the People's Republic of Kampuchea
- បទចម្រៀងនៃសាធារណរដ្ឋប្រជាមានិតកម្ពុជា
- National anthem of the People's Republic of Kampuchea National anthem of the State of Cambodia
- Lyrics: Chy Saopea
- Music: Keo Chinda
- Adopted: 8 January 1979
- Readopted: 1989 (without words)
- Relinquished: 1989 (lyrics); 1992 (music)
- Preceded by: "Victorious Seventeenth of April"
- Succeeded by: "Song of the Royal Kingdom"

Instrumental Version

"Anthem of the People's Republic of Kampuchea" (Khmer: បទចម្រៀងនៃសាធារណរដ្ឋប្រជាមានិតកម្ពុជា, UNGEGN: Bât Châmrieng ney Sathéarônârôdth Brâchéaméanit Kâmpŭchéa [ɓɑt cɑmriəŋ nɨj saːtʰiərĕənarŏət prɑciəmiənɨt kampuciə]) was the national anthem of the People's Republic of Kampuchea from 1979 to 1989, and without lyrics, the national anthem of the State of Cambodia between 1989 and 1992. It was composed by Keo Chinda and Chy Saopea. While Vietnam and most Communist governments recognized the People's Republic of Kampuchea during its existence, the Khmer Rouge, together with the monarchists and Khmer People's National Liberation Front, formed the Coalition Government of Democratic Kampuchea that continued to use the anthem of Democratic Kampuchea. It was this government-in-exile that was recognized by China, North Korea, Romania, and most Western Bloc governments and the United Nations; as such, many Western sources continued to list "Dap Prampi Mesa Moha Chouk Chey" as being the Cambodian national anthem until the restoration of the monarchy in 1993.

== Lyrics ==
Khmer

ពលរដ្ឋកម្ពុជាជាកម្លាំងប្ដូរផ្ដាច់
សច្ចាកម្ទេចអស់ពួកបច្ចាមិត្ត
តាំងចិត្តសាមគ្គីទើបមានមហិទ្ធិឫទ្ធិ
ស៊ូប្ដូរជីវិតបង្ហូរឈាមប្ដូរយកជ័យ ។

កងទ័ពកម្ពុជាពុះពារក្លាហានសម្រុក
ឧបសគ្គរាំងមុខឆ្លងកាត់សម្រេចបាន
កម្ទេចខ្មាំងចង្រៃពូជសាមាន្យ
នាំសេរីថ្កើងថ្កានជូនប្រជាជន ។

វីរកម្ពុជាបុត្រមោះមុតក្នុងសង្គ្រាម
ប្ដេជ្ញាសងឈាមនឹងខ្មាំងសត្រូវ
ទង់ជ័យប្រាសាទពណ៌ឈាមខ្ពស់សន្ធៅ
នាំជាតិឈានទៅសាងសុខក្សេមក្សាន្ត ។

UNGEGN romanization

Pôlrôdth kâmpŭchéa chéa kâmlăng pdor phdăch
Sâchcha kâmtéch ás puŏk bâchchamĭtt
Tăng chĕt sâmôkki teub méan môhĕtthĭrœ̆tthĭ
Su phdor chivĭt bânghor chhéam phdor yôk choăy.

Kângtoăp kâmpŭchéa pŭhpéar khlahan sâmrŭk
Ôbâsâkk reăng môk chhlâng kăt sâmréch ban
Kâmtéch khmăng chângrey puch saméany
Noăm séri thkaeunthkan chun prâchéachôn.

Virô kâmpŭchéa bŏtr mŏăhmŭt knŏng sângkréam
Pdéchnhéa sâng chhéam nœ̆ng khmăng sâtrov
Tóng choăy prasat pôr chhéam khpós sânthŏu
Noăm chéatĕ chhéan tŏu sang sŏkh ksémksant.

Vietnamese translation

Toàn dân Campuchia là lực lượng cách mạng,
Toàn dân Campuchia thề diệt sạch kẻ thù,
Tình anh em làm nên sức mạnh của chúng ta,
Nguyện dâng máu xương ta cho ngày đại thắng.

Quân dân Campuchia anh dũng tiến lên,
Vượt qua mọi rào cản chông gai
Kẻ thù gian ác rồi đây cũng lụi tàn,
Ta sẽ đem lại tự do no ấm cho nhân dân.

Chiến sĩ Campuchia anh hùng xông qua chiến tuyến,
Quyết quên thân mình rửa nhục cho dân tộc,
Phất cao lá cờ ngôi đền vàng nhuộm máu,
Dẫn dắt quốc gia đi đến con đường hạnh phúc!

English translation

Cambodians are a force for change,
we swear to destroy all enemies,
harmonization makes us stronger,
we sacrifice our life, spilling blood for victory.

Cambodian army is valorous,
we cross all barriers,
all enemies are destroyed,
we bring the precious freedom to the people.

Cambodian heroes, the sons of a brutal war,
they swear to seek revenge towards their enemies,
the victorious red temple flag is erected,
we lead the nation into happiness.
