= Azimuthal equidistant projection =

Azimuthal equidistant map projection

Azimuthal equidistant projection maps

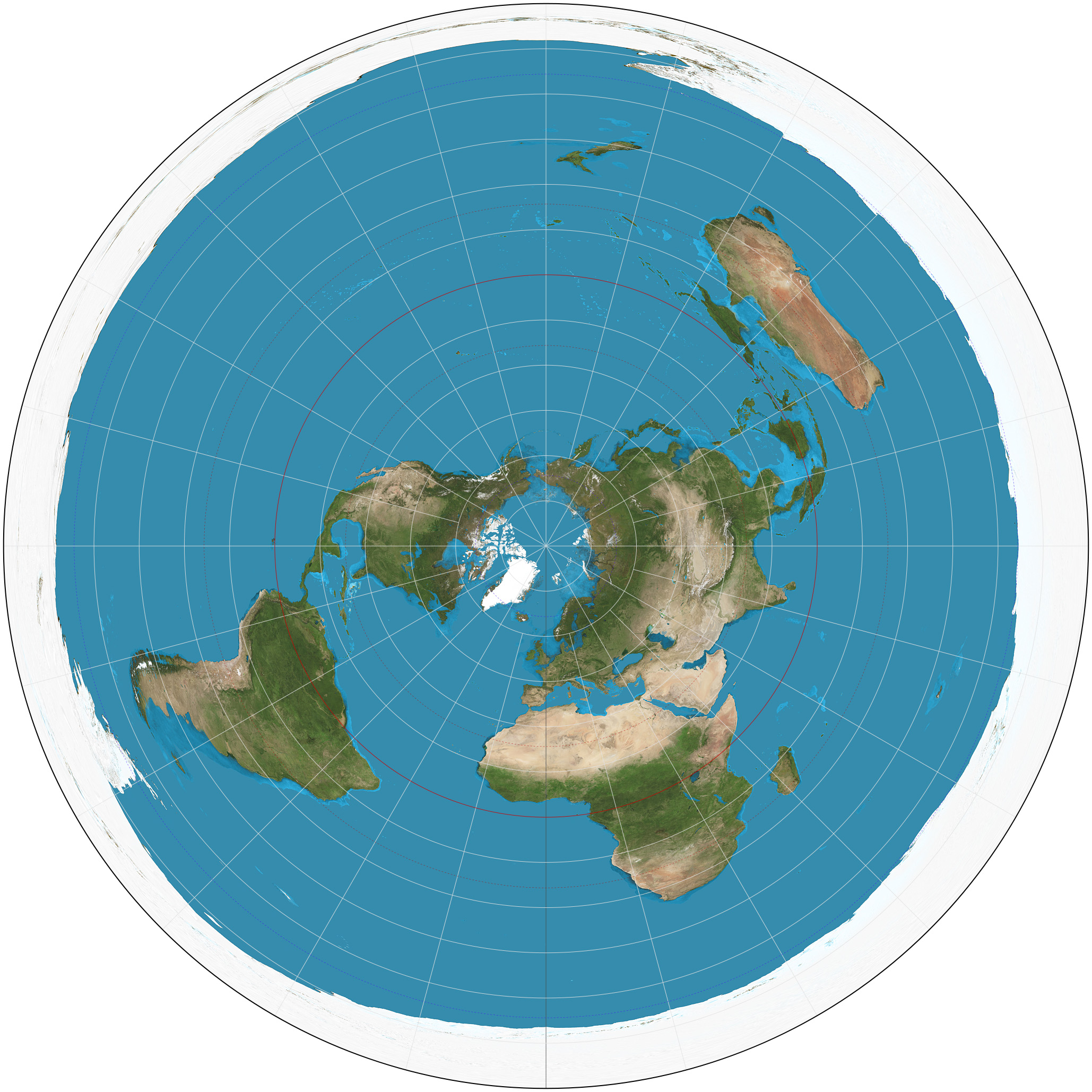
Map centered about the North Pole, extending all the way to the South Pole

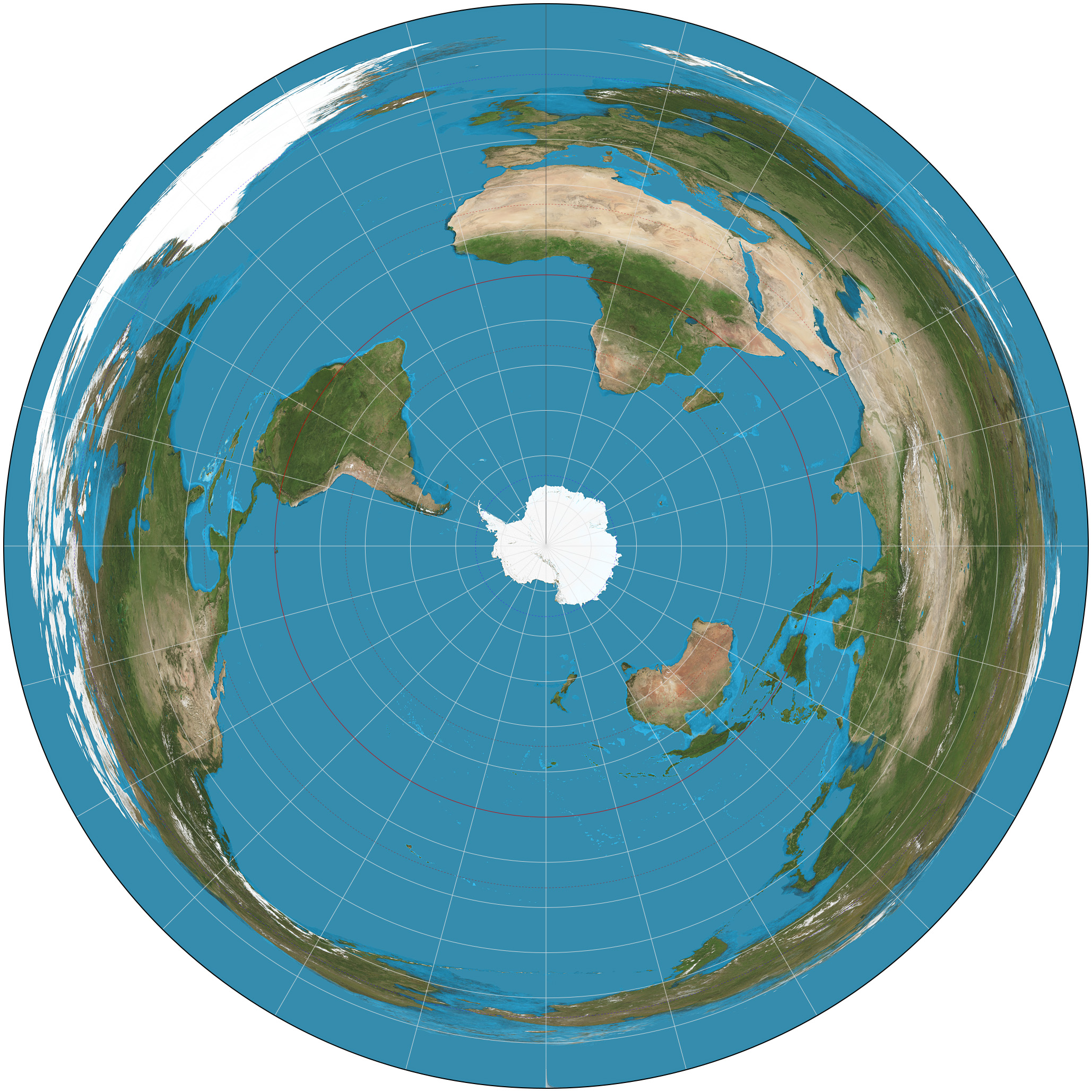
Map centered about the South Pole, extending all the way to the North Pole

The azimuthal equidistant projection is an azimuthal map projection. It has the useful properties that all points on the map are at proportionally correct distances from the center point, and that all points on the map are at the correct azimuth (direction) from the center point — that is, it is the exponential map on a sphere. A useful application for this type of projection is a polar projection which shows all meridians (lines of longitude) as straight, with distances from the pole represented correctly.

The flag of the United Nations contains an example of a polar azimuthal equidistant projection.

== History ==
While it may have been used by ancient Egyptians for star maps in some holy books, the earliest text describing the azimuthal equidistant projection is an 11th-century work by al-Biruni. The earliest extant terrestrial map in this projection is a pair of hemispheres by Glareanus of about 1510. The projection was nevertheless used earlier by Spanish and Portuguese mapmakers, as polar azimuthal hemispheres made it easy to visualize the boundary agreed at the Treaty of Tordesillas of 1494.

The projection appears in many Renaissance maps, and Gerardus Mercator used it for an inset of the north polar regions in sheet 13 and legend 6 of his well-known 1569 map. Another early example of this system is the world map by ‛Ali b. Ahmad al-Sharafi of Sfax in 1571. In France and Russia this projection is named "Postel projection" after Guillaume Postel, who used it for a map in 1581. Many modern star chart planispheres use the polar azimuthal equidistant projection.

Comparison of the Azimuthal equidistant projection and some azimuthal projections centred on 90° N at the same scale, ordered by projection altitude in Earth radii (click for detail)

The polar azimuthal equidistant projection has also been adopted by 21st century Flat Earthers as a map of the Flat Earth, particularly due to its use in the UN flag and its depiction of Antarctica as a ring around the edge of the Earth.

== Mathematical definition ==
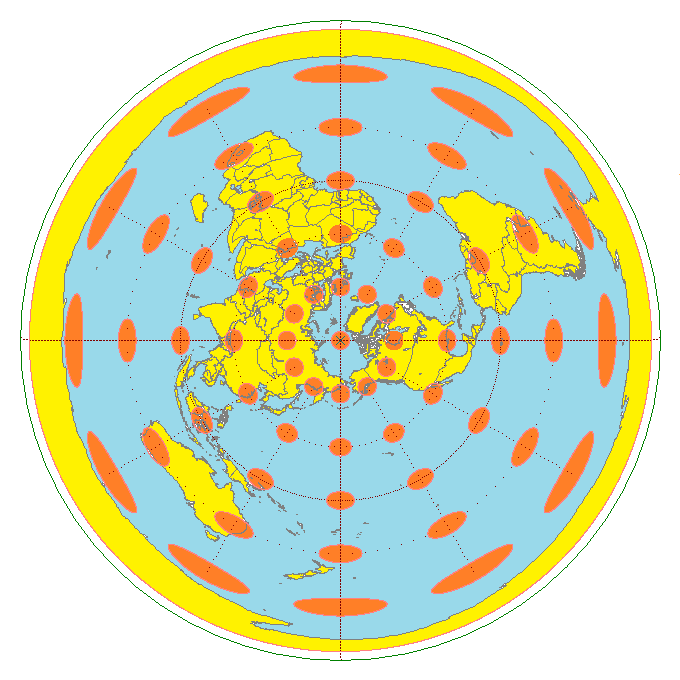
Tissot's indicatrix applied to the azimuthal equidistant projection: The orange spots on the map are all circular on the sphere. The more the circular spots appear stretched, the more the distortion created by the projection.

A point on the globe is chosen as "the center" in the sense that mapped distances and azimuth directions from that point to any other point will be correct. That point, (φ_{0}, λ_{0}), will project to the center of a circular projection, with φ referring to latitude and λ referring to longitude. All points along a given azimuth will project along a straight line from the center, and the angle θ that the line subtends from the vertical is the azimuth angle. The distance from the center point to another projected point ρ is the arc length along a great circle between them on the globe. By this description, then, the point on the plane specified by (θ, ρ) will be projected to Cartesian coordinates:
$$x = \rho \sin \theta, \qquad y = -\rho \cos \theta$$

The relationship between the coordinates (θ, ρ) of the point on the globe, and its latitude and longitude coordinates (φ, λ) is given by the equations:
$$\begin{align}
\cos \frac{\rho}{R} &= \sin \varphi_0 \sin \varphi + \cos \varphi_0 \cos \varphi \cos \left(\lambda - \lambda_0\right) \\
\tan \theta &= \frac{\cos \varphi \sin \left(\lambda - \lambda_0\right)}{\cos \varphi_0 \sin \varphi - \sin \varphi_0 \cos \varphi \cos \left(\lambda - \lambda_0\right)}
\end{align}$$

When the center point is the north pole, φ_{0} equals $\pi/2$ and λ_{0} is arbitrary, so it is most convenient to assign it the value of 0. This assignment significantly simplifies the equations for ρ_{u} and θ to:
$$\rho = R \left( \frac{\pi}{2} - \varphi \right), \qquad \theta = \lambda~~$$

== Limitation ==
With the circumference of the Earth being approximately 40,000 km (24,855 mi), the maximum distance that can be displayed on an azimuthal equidistant projection map is approximately 20,000 km (12,427 mi), half the circumference. For distances less than about 10,000 km (6,214 mi) distortions are minimal visually. (Note: The country boundaries and landmasses in the azimuthal equidistant maps below look similar to the way they look on globes within the regions inside the red circles of radius 10,000 km (6,214 mi)) For distances about 10,000–15,000 km (6,214–9,321 mi) the distortions are visually moderate. (Note: The Indian subcontinent and Arabian Peninsula are between the red and purple circles in the azimuthal equidistant map below centered about Los Angeles (circle radii between 10,000–15,000 km (6,214–9,321 mi)), and hence look squished, yet still recognizable, relative to the way they look on a globe) Distortions become severe when the distances are greater than about 15,000 km (9,321 mi). (Note: The Island of Madagascar, off the East Coast of Africa is outside the purple circle of radius 15,000 km (9,321 mi) in the azimuthal equidistant map below centered about Los Angeles, and hence looks much more stretched out than it would on a globe)

If the azimuthal equidistant projection map is centered about a point whose antipodal point lies on land and the map is extended to the maximum distance of 20,000 km (12,427 mi) the antipode point smears into a large circle. This is shown in the example of two maps centered about Los Angeles, and Taipei. The antipode for Los Angeles is in the south Indian Ocean hence there is not much significant distortion of land masses for the Los Angeles centered map except for East Africa and Madagascar. On the other hand, Taipei's antipode is near the Argentina–Paraguay border, causing the Taipei centered map to severely distort South America.

Sample azimuthal equidistant projection maps of maximum distance
(radius ≈ 20,000 km (12,427 mi))

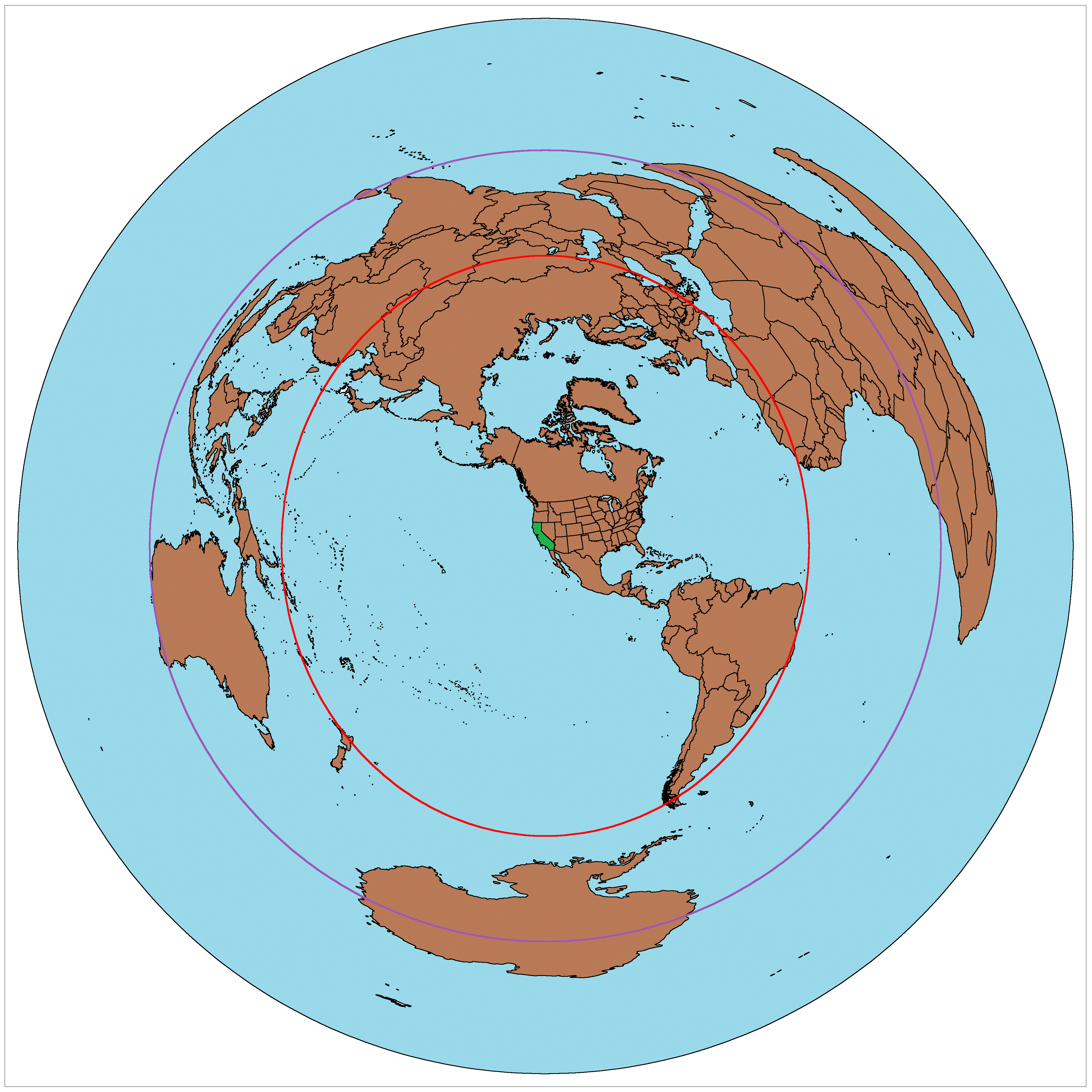
Map centered about Los Angeles, whose antipodal point is in the south Indian Ocean
- California

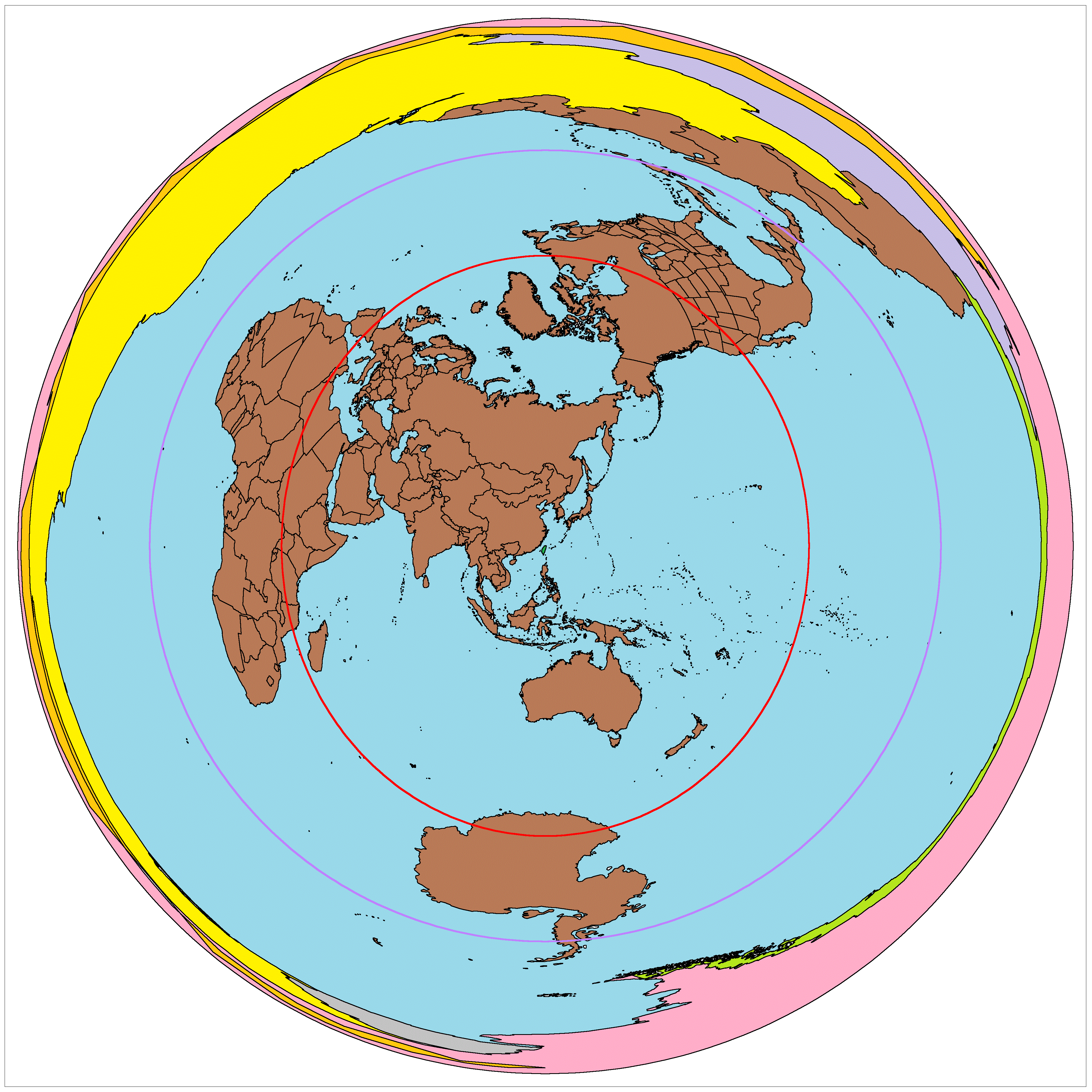
Map centered about Taipei, whose antipodal point is near the Argentina–Paraguay border
- Taiwan
- Brazil
- Paraguay
- Argentina
- Chile
- Bolivia
- Uruguay

Red circles: 10,000 km radius circles
Purple circles: 15,000 km radius circles

== Applications ==
Azimuthal equidistant projection maps can be useful in terrestrial point to point communication. This type of projection allows the operator to easily determine in which direction to point their directional antenna. The operator simply finds on the map the location of the target transmitter or receiver (i.e. the other antenna being communicated with) and uses the map to determine the azimuth angle needed to point the operator's antenna. The operator would use an electric rotator to point the antenna. The map can also be used in one way communication. For example if the operator is looking to receive signals from a distant radio station, this type of projection could help identify the direction of the distant radio station. In order for the map to be useful, the map should be centered as close as possible about the location of the operator's antenna.

Azimuthal equidistant projection maps can also be useful to show ranges of ballistic missiles, as demonstrated by the map below. The map is centered on North Korea, along with concentric circle overlays showing the different ranges of the country's missiles.

An azimuthal equidistant projection centered on North Korea with overlays showing the ranges of their different missiles

An azimuthal equidistant projection map used by the United Nations for its emblem

== See also ==
- Lambert azimuthal equal-area projection
- List of map projections
- Modern flat Earth beliefs
