= National symbols of Cambodia =

The national symbols of Cambodia (Khmer: អត្តសញ្ញាណជាតិកម្ពុជា) includes the ancient monument of Angkor Wat, the national flag, the national anthem, and the national emblem and royal seal. In 2005, the Kingdom of Cambodia designated seven flora and fauna as national symbols in an effort to promote nationalism and protection and conservation of these plants and animals.

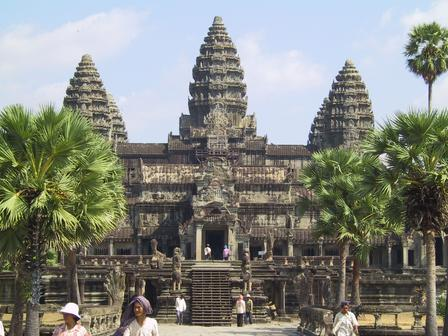
The sugar palm, Borassus flabellifer, and Angkor Wat are two symbols of Cambodia; the latter is also portrayed on the flag of Cambodia.

== National symbols ==
| Type | Symbol | Image | Notes |
|---|---|---|---|
| Coat of arms | Royal arms of Cambodia ព្រះរាជសិង្ហា | Royal arms of Cambodia | It was adopted from 1953 to 1970 and readopted in 1993. |
| Flag | Flag of Cambodia ទង់ជាតិកម្ពុជា | Flag of Cambodia | The design was first adopted in 1948. It was relinquished in 1970 and readopted in 1993. |
| Anthem | "Nokor Reach" "នគររាជ" | | "Nokor Reach" is the title of Cambodia’s national anthem which was first adopted in 1941. |
| Language | Khmer ភាសាខ្មែរ/ខេមរភាសា | | It is the official and national language of Cambodia. |
| Motto | "Nation, Religion, King" "ជាតិ សាសនា ព្រះមហាក្សត្រ" | | |
| Religion | Buddhism (predominantly Theravada) ព្រះពុទ្ធសាសនា (ភាគច្រើនជាព្រះពុទ្ធសាសនាថេរវាទ) | Flag of Buddhism | It is enshrined in the constitution as the official religion of the country. |

== List of officially designated flora and fauna ==
| Type | Symbol | Image |
|---|---|---|
| National tree | Borassus flabellifer ត្នោត; Tnaôt | |
| National flower | Rumduol រំដួល; Rumduŏl | |
| National fruit | Chicken egg banana ចេកពងមាន់ Chék Pông Moăn | |
| National fish | Giant barb ត្រីគល់រាំង; Trei kól reăng | |
| National reptile | Royal turtle អណ្ដើកហ្លួង; Ândaeuk luŏng | |
| National bird | Giant ibis ត្រយ៉ង; Trâyâng | |
| National mammal | Kouprey គោព្រៃ Koŭprey | |

== See also ==
- Apsara
- Nāga
- Preah Thong and Neang Neak
- Angkor Wat
