= Khŭm Sráng =

Khum Srang
- Town
- Location within Cambodia
- Coordinates: 11°18′N 104°38′E
- Country: Cambodia
- Province: Kampong Speu Province
- District: Kong Pisei District

Khum Srang is a small town in Kong Pisei District in Kampong Speu Province, Cambodia. The National Road 124 passes through the town in a north–south direction while the National Road 125 passes from east to west and then leading north-west to connect the town to Kampong Speu.
