= United Nations Honour Flag =

Flag symbolizing the Allies of World War II and their goal of world peace

Honour
- Other names: United Nations Honour Flag, United Nations Honor Flag, United Nations Flag, Four Freedoms Flag, Honor Flag, Honour Flag
- Adopted: Never official
- Design: A white flag with four vertical bars (usually red) which do not touch the edge of the field
- Designed by: Brooks Harding

The United Nations Honour Flag (also termed the United Nations Flag, the Honour Flag, or the Four Freedoms Flag, with alternate spelling "Honor" also used) was a flag symbolizing the Allies of World War II and their goal of world peace. It was designed in October 1942 by Brooks Harding (who was inspired by Franklin D. Roosevelt's Four Freedoms speech of January 1941), and it had some degree of use as a flag from 13 June 1943 to c. 1948 to represent the "United Nations" in the sense of the January 1942 Declaration by United Nations. The vertical bars symbolized each of the Four Freedoms, red for blood dedicated to freedom and the white field for peace. However, it was never an official flag of the United Nations as an organization (which was founded in 1945, and adopted a different flag in 1946).

== History ==
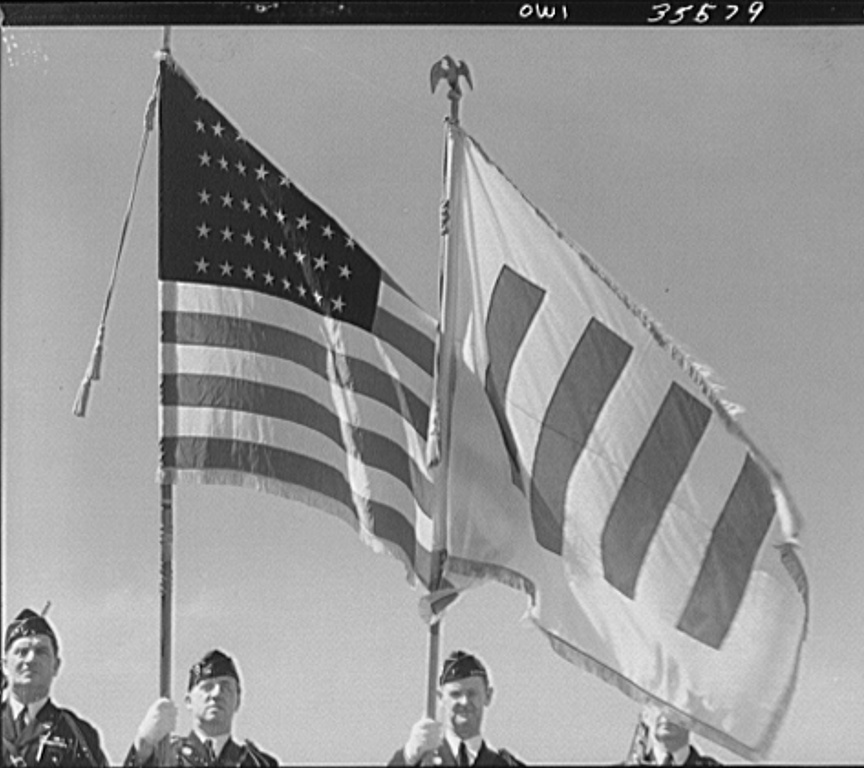
1943 photo of U.S. soldiers flying the U.S. flag and the Honour flag

Brooks B. Harding (1896–1959), an American, made the acquaintance of United States President Franklin Delano Roosevelt and British Prime Minister Winston Churchill in December 1941 by presenting each with a Victory V symbol embossed in leather with the slogan Absolute Victory by delivery at the White House at a time when Churchill was in the United States for the Arcadia Conference to sign the Declaration by United Nations. Churchill's recognition of Harding noted a need for a symbol of the wartime Allies. In October 1942, Harding traveled to Washington, D.C. with six cloth designs. In his meeting at the United States Department of State, he learned that since there was no United Nations committee to present his designs to, he would have to obtain approvals from all 29 signatory nations individually. Upon meeting with Dr. Vladimir Palic, First Secretary of the Czechoslovak Embassy, a single specific design involving four bars was determined to be the appropriate candidate to put forth. All 29 nations subsequently agreed to the four vertical bar design. However, the flag was determined not to be used as an official emblem of the organization, but rather a symbol of the people and governments. It was flown at Dumbarton Oaks in June 1943 in the presence of United Nations military attaches from all United Nations embassies in full uniform. The Honour flag was also flown throughout Washington at private buildings in August 1943 during the Atlantic Charter week, where it also flew as a secondary flag to national emblems throughout the war. It gradually flew at more and more government offices and was distributed to various of the United Nations, and it was officially adopted in several countries starting with New Zealand. By a motion in the United States Senate, the flag was flown in thousands of towns to celebrate V-E Day. At the United Nations Conference on International Organization, where there was a golden motif, the red bars were substituted with gold, while some nations preferred green and blue bars.

Additional names include Friendship Flag, Freedom Flag, Goodwill Flag, and Flag of Four Freedoms. It is regarded as a symbol of the Allied Forces of World War II. The flag is listed in the online Dictionary of Vexillology at "HONOUR (or HONOR) FLAG" with the following primary definition "The flag, now obsolete, that was selected to represent those nations which were working towards world peace prior to the founding of the United Nations Organization, and in official/semi-official use (particularly, but not exclusively, in the USA) from 1943 to c1948 – the four freedoms flag."

Proposed United Nations Flag

Adopted Flag of the United Nations

The United Nations Honour Flag served as the background for a 1947 United Nations flag proposal that also included the Seal of the United Nations. The final version of the Flag of the United Nations used a light blue background. Harding submitted a proposal for a "United Nations Authority Flag" to the United Nations on 20 January 1947 combining the seal of the United Nations and the earlier Four Freedoms Flag. This proposal was withdrawn in August 1947.
