= Oliver Lincoln Lundquist =

American architect and industrial designer

Oliver Lincoln Lundquist (September 20, 1916 – December 28, 2008) was an American architect and industrial designer who headed the team which was responsible for the design of the United Nations logo and the Q-Tip box.

== Biography ==
=== Early life and education ===
Lundquist was born on September 20, 1916, in Westbury, New York and grew up in Peekskill, New York. His mother was Frances Molly and his father was Louis Henrik Lundquist, a landscape architect. He attended Columbia University, where he studied architecture.

=== Industrial design and military service ===
He was hired by Raymond Loewy's industrial design firm in 1937 while he was a senior at Columbia, and was trained by the well-known architect himself. For the 1939 New York World's Fair, Lundquist was part of a team that developed a wind tunnel effect showing smoke traveling over a Chrysler Air Flow car for that company's pavilion at the fair. He created a "magic talking car" that spoke about Chrysler's car with the voice of the host of Major Bowes Amateur Hour. He created a "frozen forest" of steel palm trees with refrigerant inside to demonstrate Chrysler's automotive air conditioning system. At the Loewy firm, he developed the blue-and-white Q-Tip box, described by The New York Times as "one of the most widely known of product packages."

Lundquist worked with Eero Saarinen at the Office of Strategic Services during World War II. Saarinen and Lundquist won a Post War Living housing competition sponsored by Arts & Architecture for a house they had jointly designed.

Lundquist was a pioneer of track lighting and created designs for the lighting company Lightolier.

Lundquist served as a lieutenant in the United States Navy during World War II in the Office of Strategic Services, where he prepared visual presentations for the Joint Chiefs of Staff and the Washington press corps, working together with Alger Hiss and Saarinen.

=== United Nations and its logo ===
Flag of the United Nations

Following his military service, Lundquist attended the United Nations Conference on International Organization in San Francisco, California. The organizers of the 1945 conference wanted an insignia that could be made into a pin to identify delegates. United States Secretary of State Edward Stettinius, Jr. was chairman of the U.S. delegation, and realized that a temporary design might become the permanent symbol of the United Nations. He formed a committee headed by Lundquist that developed a design consisting of a world map surrounded by leaves from a design created by Donal McLaughlin.

The blue color that appears in the background of the insignia was chosen to be "the opposite of red, the war color". The original color the group chose in 1945 was a gray blue that differs from the current United Nations flag.

The globe used in the original design was an azimuthal projection focused on the North Pole with North America and the United States, the host nation of the conference, at the bottom center. The projection used cut off portions of the Southern Hemisphere at the latitude of Argentina which was acceptable as Argentina was not then a member of the United Nations. The final design used in the modern logo was expanded to include all of South America and was rotated 90 degrees to place the Prime Meridian at the center.

As special services officer for the United Nations, Lundquist announced in June 1946 that the organization would use the charting and diagramming techniques that had been used successfully by the United States Armed Forces to present information internally and for public use. The division would also be responsible for the planning of the UN's temporary offices in Lake Success, New York, including design of buttons, passes, letterhead and license plates.

=== Architecture ===
As an architect, Lundquist became a partner in the firm Von Der Lancken & Lundquist, with Julian von der Lancken, and later with Lundquist & Stonehill.

He designed or renovated buildings and offices for Bache & Co., Donaldson, Lufkin & Jenrette, Hoffmann–La Roche and Sotheby Parke Bernet and at the former Kodak Building in Manhattan, in addition to work on hospitals, schools and buildings for the New York City Department of Parks and Recreation.

=== Personal life ===
He married Harriet Elizabeth "Betty" Cooper (June 6, 1916 - November 17, 2009) in 1944 after meeting in Washington, D.C. She was a photographer, political activist and family therapist. They divorced in 1975.

Lundquist died at age 92 on December 28, 2008, of prostate cancer at his home in the Yorkville, Manhattan neighborhood. He and Betty had three children, Jill Lundquist, Timothy Wade Lundquist (April 16, 1949 - July 8, 2016) and Eric Cooper Lundquist, and six grandchildren - Sarah Botstein, Abby Botstein (1973-1981), Benjamin Lundquist, Adam Lundquist-Baz, Tessa Lundquist and Molly Lundquist-Baz.

He served on the board of trustees of now-defunct Franconia College in New Hampshire while his son Tim was a student there. In 1970 his daughter, Jill, was living with Leon Botstein, now the president of Bard College. The Franconia board appointed Botstein, then 23, as president of the struggling college, making him the youngest college president in US history.
