= Dap Prampi Mesa Moha Chouk Chey =

Former Anthem of Democratic Kampuchea

Dap Prampi Mesa Moha Chokchey
English: Victorious Seventeenth of April
- ដប់ប្រាំពីរមេសាមហាជោគជ័យ
- National anthem of Democratic Kampuchea and the Coalition Government of Democratic Kampuchea
- Adopted: 6 January 1976
- Relinquished: 7 January 1979
- Preceded by: Majestic Kingdom
- Succeeded by: Anthem of the People's Republic of Kampuchea (1979); Nokor Reach (1993)

Audio sample
- Dap Prampi Mesa Moha Chokchey: file; help

"Dap Prampi Mesa Moha Chokchey" (Khmer: ដប់ប្រាំពីរមេសាមហាជោគជ័យ, UNGEGN: Dap Prampi Mesa Moha Chouk Chey) was the national anthem of Democratic Kampuchea from at least January 1976. Although the anthem may have been in use in the "liberated zone" much earlier, it was proclaimed the national anthem in article 18 of the Constitution of Kampuchea which was promulgated on 5 January 1976. Supposedly, the Khmer Rouge and/or Pol Pot himself wrote the piece, but its origin remains unknown.

After Vietnam militarily intervened and forced the Khmer Rouge out of most of Cambodia, the People's Republic of Kampuchea was established and used a new anthem. However, the Coalition Government of Democratic Kampuchea continued to use "Dap Prampi Mesa Moha Chokchey" as its state anthem in exile. Since the Coalition Government was recognized as the legitimate government of Cambodia by many Western nations and the United Nations, its state anthem continued to be presented as the national anthem of Cambodia in the West until the restoration of the monarchy in 1993.

== Lyrics ==
Khmer

ឈាមក្រហមច្រាល
ស្រោចស្រពក្រុងវាល
កម្ពុជាមាតុភូមិ
ឈាមកម្មករ កសិករដ៏ឧត្តម
ឈាមយុទ្ធជន យុទ្ធនារីបដិវត្តន៍ ។

ឈាមប្រែក្លាយជាកំហឹងខ្លាំងក្លា
តស៊ូមោះមុត
ដប់ប្រាំពីរមេសាក្រោមទង់បដិវត្តន៍
ឈាមរំដោះអំពីភាពខ្ញុំគេ!

ជយោ! ជយោ!
ដប់ប្រាំពីរមេសាជោគជ័យ
មហាអស្ចារ្យមានន័យធំធេង
លើសសម័យអង្គរ!

យើងរួបរួមគ្នា
កសាងកម្ពុជានិងសង្គមថ្មីបវរ
ប្រជាធិបតេយ្យ សមភាពនិងយុត្ដិធម៌
តាមមាគ៌ាម្ចាស់ការ ឯករាជ្យរឹងមាំ។

ប្ដេជ្ញាដាច់ខាតការពារមាតុភូមិ
ទឹកដីឧត្តម បដិវត្តន៍ដ៏រុងរឿង

ជយោ! ជយោ! ជយោ កម្ពុជាថ្មី!
ប្រជាធិបតេយ្យ សម្បូរថ្កុំថ្កើង
ប្តេជ្ញាជ្រោងគ្រវីទង់បដិវត្តន៍ក្រហមខ្ពស់ឡើង
សាងមាតុភូមិយើងឱ្យចម្រើនលោតផ្លោះ
មហារុងរឿង មហាអស្ចារ្យ!

UNGEGN romanization

Chhéam krâhâm chral
Sraôchsrâp krŏng véal
Kâmpŭchéa méatŏphum
Chhéam kâmâmkâr kâsĕkâr dâ uttâm
Chhéam yŭtthchôn yŭtthnéari bâdĕvôtt.

Chhéam brê klaychéa kâmhœ̆ng khlăngkla
Tâsu mŏăhmŭt
Dâbprăm pir mesa kraôm tông bâdĕvôtt
Chhéam rumdaôh âmpi phéap khnhom ké!

Chyoŭ! Chyoŭ!
Dâb prămpir mesa choŭkchoăy
Môha âschary méannoăy thumthéng
Leus sâmoăy Ângkôr!

Yeung ruŏbruŏm knéa
Kâsang Kâmpŭchéa nĭng sângkôm thmei bâvôr
Prâchéathĭbâtéyy sâmphéap nĭng yŭ tdĕ thôrm
Tam méarkéa mchéaskar êkréachy rœ̆ngmŏâm.

Pdéchnhéa dachkhat karpéar méatŏphum
Tœ̆kdei uttâm bâdĕvôtt dâ rŭngrœăng.

Chyoŭ! Chyoŭ! Chyoŭ Kâmpŭchéa thmei!
Prâchéathĭbâtéyy sâmpur thkomthkaeung
Pté chnhéa chroŭng krôv tông bâdĕvôtt krâhâm khpsá laeung
Sang méatŏphum yeung aôy châmreun lout phlaôh
Môha rŭngrœăng môha âschary!

English translation

The bright scarlet blood
Flooded over the towns and plains of our
motherland Kampuchea,
The blood of our great workers and farmers
The men and women who fight for our revolution.

Their blood produced a great anger and the courage
To contend with heroism.
On the 17th of April, under the revolutionary banner,
Their blood freed us from the state of slavery!

Hurrah! Hurrah!
For the glorious 17th of April!
That wonderful victory had greater significance
Than the Angkor period!

We are uniting
To construct a Kampuchea with a new and better society,
Democratic, egalitarian and just.
We follow the road to firmly-based independence.

We absolutely guarantee to defend our motherland,
Our fine territory and our magnificent revolution!

Hurrah! Hurrah! Hurrah for the new Kampuchea!
A splendid and democratic land of plenty!
We guarantee to raise aloft and wave the red banner of the revolution.
We shall make our motherland prosperous beyond all others,
Magnificent and wonderful!
