= Flag of the People's Republic of Kampuchea =

Flag of Cambodia from 1979 to 1989

People's Republic of Kampuchea
- Use: National flag and ensign
- Proportion: 2:3
- Adopted: 7 January 1979
- Relinquished: 1 May 1989
- Design: Red field with a yellow five-towered Angkor Wat silhouette in the center
- Design: Same flag with various Angkor Wat silhouette design

The flag of the People's Republic of Kampuchea was a historical flag of Cambodia from 1979 to 1989, used during the Cambodian–Vietnamese War.

The flag that became the official flag of the People's Republic of Kampuchea had been previously adopted by the Kampuchean United Front for National Salvation (KUFNS), who had revived the flag of the Khmer Issarak in the days of anti-French resistance, declaring it the flag of the PRK.

== State of Cambodia ==
State of Cambodia
- Use: National flag and ensign
- Proportion: 2:3
- Adopted: 1 May 1989
- Relinquished: 24 September 1993
- Design: Red, blue field, a yellow five-towered Angkor Wat in the center
- Designed by: Hun Sen
- Variant using the five-towered Angkor Wat silhouette

In 1989, Hun Sen renamed the country as the State of Cambodia and changed the flag: instead of just fully red, it was half red above and half blue below, reviving the blue color of preceding Cambodian flags. It had a yellow five-towered Angkor Wat silhouette in the center like the first. In some versions the Angkor Wat of the State of Cambodia flag displayed the architectural details of the Angkorian structure outlined in black.

Although the flags of the People's Republic of Kampuchea, and later the flag of the State of Cambodia, became the official flags within Cambodia after the ousting of the Khmer Rouge government of Democratic Kampuchea, the flag of Democratic Kampuchea would still be used by the Coalition Government of Democratic Kampuchea and in the United Nations. As the PRK failed to gain widespread international recognition most states kept diplomatic ties with the Coalition Government of Democratic Kampuchea.

== Symbolism ==
Red symbolizes blood and revolution. The five-towered Angkor Wat silhouette refers to the unity of soldiers, traders, workers, peasants and intellectuals of Kampuchea. The symbolism are fundamentally the same to the five-pointed star on the Flag of Vietnam.
