= United Nations–administered Cambodia =

UN-administered territory from 1992 to 1993

Cambodia កម្ពុជា Kâmpŭchéa
- 1992–1993
- Flag Emblem
- Anthem: "Song of the Paris Peace Agreement"
- Location of Cambodia in Southeast Asia.
- Status: Independent state under United Nations administration
- Capital and largest city: Phnom Penh
- Common languages: Khmer
- Special Representative of the Secretary General
  - 1992–1993: Yasushi Akashi
- Chairman of the Supreme National Council
  - 1992–1993: Norodom Sihanouk
- Prime Minister
  - 1992–1993: Hun Sen
  - 1993: Norodom Ranariddh
- Historical era: Aftermaths of Third Indochina War and first phase of Cambodian conflict
  - UN Security Council Resolution 745 and establishment of the UNTAC: 28 February 1992
  - UNTAC becomes operational: 15 March 1992
  - Elections: 23 May 1993
  - Monarchy restored: 24 September 1993
- Currency: Riel (៛) (KHR)
- Time zone: UTC+07:00 (ICT)
- Calling code: +855
Preceded by	Succeeded by
State of Cambodia; Democratic Kampuchea	Second Kingdom of Cambodia

Between 28 February 1992, or 15 March 1992, and 24 September 1993, Cambodia was administered by the United Nations Transitional Authority in Cambodia (UNTAC) under the terms of the 1991 Paris Peace Agreements which ended the Cambodian–Vietnamese War.

This was the first time the United Nations directly assumed responsibility for the administration of an independent member state.

== Background ==
The Kingdom of Cambodia became independent from France on 9 November 1953. The monarchy was overthrown in a coup d'état on 18 March 1970 leading to the formation of the Khmer Republic. The Khmer Rouge came to power on 17 April 1975 resulting in the country becoming known as Democratic Kampuchea. Between 1975 and 1979, the Khmer Rouge's regime killed millions of its own people through mass executions, forced labour, and starvation, is what came to be known as the Cambodian genocide. The Khmer Rouge were overthrown on 7 January 1979 following the Vietnamese invasion of Cambodia. A rival government, the People's Republic of Kampuchea, was subsequently proclaimed by Vietnamese occupation forces, however the previous regime, which would become the Coalition Government of Democratic Kampuchea in 1982, continued to be recognised by the United Nations as the legitimate government of Cambodia. The Paris Peace Accords were signed in October 1991 to end the ongoing conflicts in Cambodia. The United Nations Transitional Authority in Cambodia (UNTAC) was established following the adoption of Resolution 745 by the Security Council on 28 February 1992.

== Administration ==
The Paris Peace Agreement specified the system of administration in Cambodia during the transitional period.

=== Supreme National Council ===
The Supreme National Council (SNC) as the sovereign body of Cambodia, represented the country externally and occupied its seat at the United Nations. Norodom Sihanouk was the chairman of the SNC. The SNC allowed its authority over all administrative agencies, bodies and offices acting in foreign affairs, national defence, finance, public security and information to be exercised by UNTAC on its behalf. A council with the same name in Cambodia was established in 2005, which also got chaired by Norodom Sihanouk.

=== Constituent Assembly ===
A Constituent Assembly was elected on 28 May 1992. Prince Ranariddh's FUNCINPEC Party was the top vote recipient with a 45.5% vote, followed by Hun Sen's Cambodian People's Party and the Buddhist Liberal Democratic Party, respectively. FUNCINPEC then entered into a coalition with the other parties that had participated in the election. The parties proceeded to draft and approve a new constitution, which came into effect on 24 September 1993. It established a multiparty democracy in the framework of a constitutional monarchy, with Prince Sihanouk elevated to King. Prince Ranariddh and Hun Sen became First and Second Prime Ministers, respectively in the new Cambodian government. Son Sann was the speaker of the assembly.

Membership by party

Party	MPs	Of total
FUNCINPEC	58	48.33%
Cambodian People's Party	51	42.50%
Buddhist Liberal Democratic Party	10	8.33%
MOULINAKA	1	0.83%
Total	120	100%

== Office holders ==
=== De facto leader ===
During the first months Chea Sim was the de facto leader of Cambodia.

Portrait	Name	Term of office		
Portrait	Name	Took office	Left office	Time in office
	Chea Sim ជា ស៊ីម (1932–2015)	22 February 1992 or 15 March 1992	c. late June 1992	c. 125 days

=== Special Representative of the Secretary General ===
Yasushi Akashi of Japan served as the Special Representative of the Secretary General for Cambodia

Portrait	Name	Term of office		
Portrait	Name	Took office	Left office	Time in office
	Yasushi Akashi 明石 康 (born 1931)	28 February 1992 or 15 March 1992	24 September 1993	1 year, 208 days

=== Chairman of the Supreme National Council ===
Prince Norodom Sihanouk became Chairman of the Supreme National Council on 17 July 1991 (and Head of State on 20 November 1991, six days after returning from abroad), retaining the position after the establishment of UNTAC in February 1992, and was appointed Chief of State by the Constituent Assembly on 14 June 1993. He would become King of Cambodia on 24 September 1993.

Portrait	Name	Term of office		
Portrait	Name	Took office	Left office	Time in office
	Prince; Norodom Sihanouk នរោត្តម សីហនុ (1922–2012)	28 February 1992 or 15 March 1992	24 September 1993	1 year, 208 days

=== Head of State (President of the Council of State/Chief of State) ===
Portrait	Name	Term of office		
Portrait	Name	Took office	Left office	Time in office
	Heng Samrin ហេង សំរិន (born 1934)	28 February 1992 or 15 March 1992	6 April 1992	38 days
	Chea Sim ជា ស៊ីម (1932–2015)	6 April 1992	14 June 1993	1 year, 69 days
	Prince; Norodom Sihanouk នរោត្តម សីហនុ (1922–2012)	14 June 1993	24 September 1993	102 days

=== Prime Minister ===
Hun Sen who had been prime minister of the People's Republic of Kampuchea since 1984 remained prime minister of Cambodia after the formation of UNTAC and was appointed as one of two co-prime ministers, together with Prince Norodom Ranariddh, by the Constituent Assembly on 2 July 1993.

Portrait	Name	Term of office		
Portrait	Name	Took office	Left office	Time in office
	Hun Sen ហ៊ុន សែន (born 1952)	28 February 1992 or 15 March 1992	24 September 1993	1 year, 208 days
	Prince; Norodom Ranariddh នរោត្តម រណឫទ្ធិ (1944–2021)	2 July 1993	24 September 1993	84 days

== See also ==
- List of territories administered by the United Nations
- United Nations Administered West New Guinea
- United Nations Administered Kosovo
- United Nations Administered East Timor
