= Kong Pisei District =

Kong Pisei ស្រុកគងពិសី
- District (srok)
- Location in Cambodia
- Coordinates: 11°22′N 104°39′E
- Country: Cambodia
- Province: Kampong Speu
- Communes: 13
- Villages: 250

Government
  - Governor: Han Piseth (CPP)

Population (2019)
  - Total: 145,476
- Time zone: +7
- Postal code: 0503
- Area code: 025
- Geocode: 0503

Kong Pisei District (Khmer: ស្រុកគងពិសី) is a district located in Kampong Speu Province, in central Cambodia. It is located in the eastern part of the province and is one of the larger districts in Kampong Speu.

It is home to a Wing Star Shoes factory.

In 2016, plans were announced for the construction of a "Chinese-funded agricultural special economic zone (SEZ) with facilities to research plant diseases." Also in 2016, damage to the Ou Treng reservoir caused flooding along National Route 3. The flood was caused by "three days of heavy rain and the release of water from the 7 Makara reservoir downstream from Kampong Speu province through the Prek Tnort river."

In February 2019, the Cambodian Mine Action Centre (CMAC) was called in to dispose of a 340 kg US M117 bomb that was discovered in Chamkar Doung village.

It is notable as the birthplace of Chuon Nath (1883–1969), one of Cambodia’s most respected monks and scholars. Born in Kamreang Village, Roka Kaoh Commune, he became a great figure in Khmer language, Buddhism, and Cambodian culture. His work on the Khmer Dictionary helped preserve the Khmer language.

== Administration ==
Kong Pisei District is subdivided into 13 communes (khum)

Khum (Commune)	Phum (Villages)
050301 Angk Popel Commune	
050302 Chongruk Commune	
050303 Moha Ruessei Commune	
050304 Pechr Muni Commune	
050305 Preah Nipean Commune	
050306 Prey Nheat Commune	
050307 Prey Vihear Commune	
050308 Roka Kaoh Commune	
050309 Sdok Commune	
050310 Snam Krapeu Commune	
050311 Srang Commune	
050312 Tuek L'ak Commune	
050313 Veal Commune	
