= Dang Tong District =

Dang Tong ស្រុកដងទង
- District (srok)
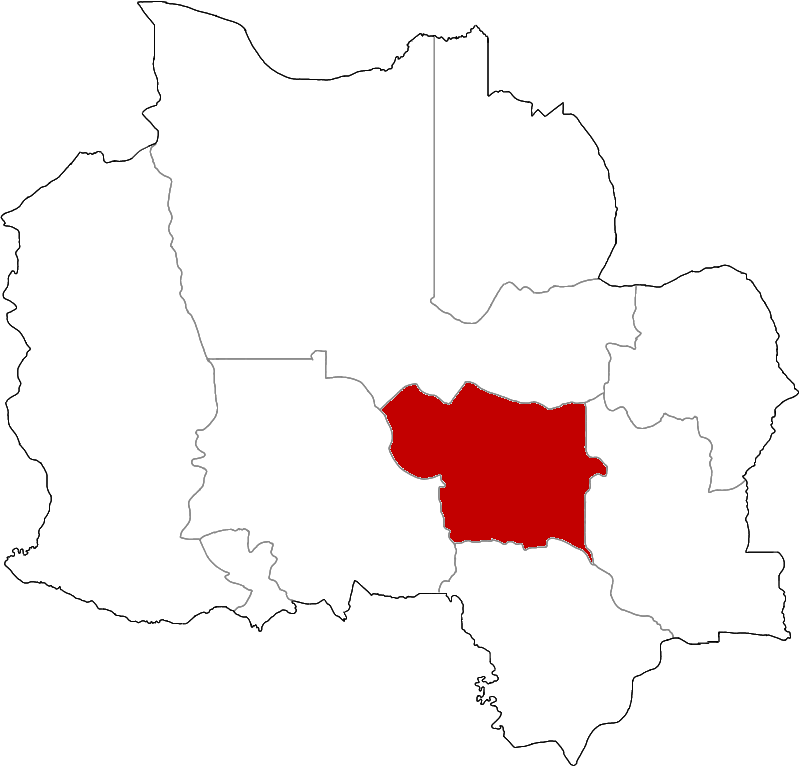
- District location in Kampot Province
- Coordinates: 10°39′26.04″N 104°27′18.94″E
- Country: Cambodia
- Province: Kampot
- Communes: 10
- Villages: 54

Population (1998)
  - Total: 50,167
- Time zone: +7
- Geocode: 0705

Dang Tong District (Khmer: ស្រុកដងទង) is a district located in Kampot Province, in southern Cambodia.

== History ==
Dang Tung District, Kampot Province is a relatively new district that was created with pieces of Kampong Trach District and Chouk District in 1986. The district center is in Toom T'mai Village, where a local temple and a large market abide.

The area is filled with rice fields in the summer and smiling, friendly farmers. Because the road to it has been quite bad, been minimal development and limited NGO presence helped the district. Most residents obtain their water supply from wells and ponds filled during the rainy season. Electricity came to Dang Tung in 2009, but many residents continue to use car batteries as their main source of power.

== Demographics ==
Over 55,000 people live in the district. They are mostly rice farmers. The district is the poorest of the eight in the province, with 3,700 people living at the lowest level of poverty.
