= Flag of Democratic Kampuchea =

Flag of Cambodia from 1976 to 1979

Democratic Kampuchea
- Use: National flag and ensign
- Proportion: 2:3
- Adopted: 5 January 1976
- Relinquished: 7 January 1979
- Design: A red field charged in the centre with a yellow silhouette of a three-towered temple
- Designed by: Khmer People's Party (original design); Khmer Communist Party (adopted design)
- Alternative design

The flag of Democratic Kampuchea was the national flag of Cambodia during the period of Khmer Rouge rule, when the country was known as Democratic Kampuchea. It was adopted on 5 January 1976, upon the implementation of a new national constitution by the Khmer Rouge. It ceased being the Cambodian national flag on 7 January 1979, when Vietnamese forces captured the capital Phnom Penh and effectively ended the Khmer Rouge government. However, the flag was retained by the exiled, Khmer Rouge–led Coalition Government of Democratic Kampuchea, which was recognised by the United Nations.

The design is a red field charged in the centre with a yellow silhouette of a three-towered temple. Although the silhouette resembles Angkor Wat, a nationally significant monument and a common motif on preceding Cambodian flags, Democratic Kampuchea's constitution did not specifically mention Angkor Wat.

== Design and symbolism ==
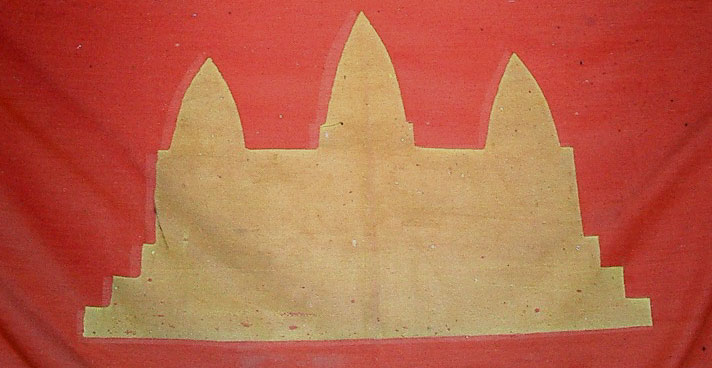
Example of a physical Democratic Kampuchea flag, with an alternate temple (wat) design

Article 16 of the Constitution of Democratic Kampuchea describes the design of the flag and gives its colours and symbols the following significance:

The background is red, with a yellow three-towered temple in the middle.

The red background symbolises the revolutionary movement, the resolute and valiant struggle of the Kampuchean people for the liberation, defence, and construction of their country.

The yellow temple symbolises national traditions of the Kampuchean people, who are defending and building the country to make it ever more prosperous.

— Article 16 of the Constitution of Democratic Kampuchea, as translated in Etcheson (2019).

While previous Cambodian national flags featured Angkor Wat, a nationally significant monument, Democratic Kampuchea's constitution did not specifically name the monument, depicting a generic brasat (ប្រាសាទ) or Buddhist temple.

== History ==
The flag of Democratic Kampuchea is derived from a flag designed by the Khmer People's Party (KPP) some time in the late 1940s or early 1950s. In 1951, the Paris-based Khmer Students' Association returned from the 3rd World Festival of Youth and Students held in Berlin with a flag gifted by the National United Front, a KPP front organisation. With slight modifications, the flag became the flag of Democratic Kampuchea over 25 years later.

The flag of the Vietnamese-backed People's Republic of Kampuchea (PRK) replaced the flag of Democratic Kampuchea as the country's national flag on 7 January 1979, upon the fall of Phnom Penh and the PRK's founding. It featured a silhouette of a five-towered temple instead of a three-towered one. Despite the PRK governing most of the country, the United Nations (UN) continued to recognise the Khmer Rouge–led government as the country's de jure representative, and so the flag of Democratic Kampuchea remained at the UN headquarters in New York City. The exiled Coalition Government of Democratic Kampuchea continued using the flag of Democratic Kampuchea until 1990, when the country entered a period of national reconciliation and political transition.

== See also ==
- List of Cambodian flags
