= National Highway 3 (Cambodia) =

Road in Cambodia

National Highway 3

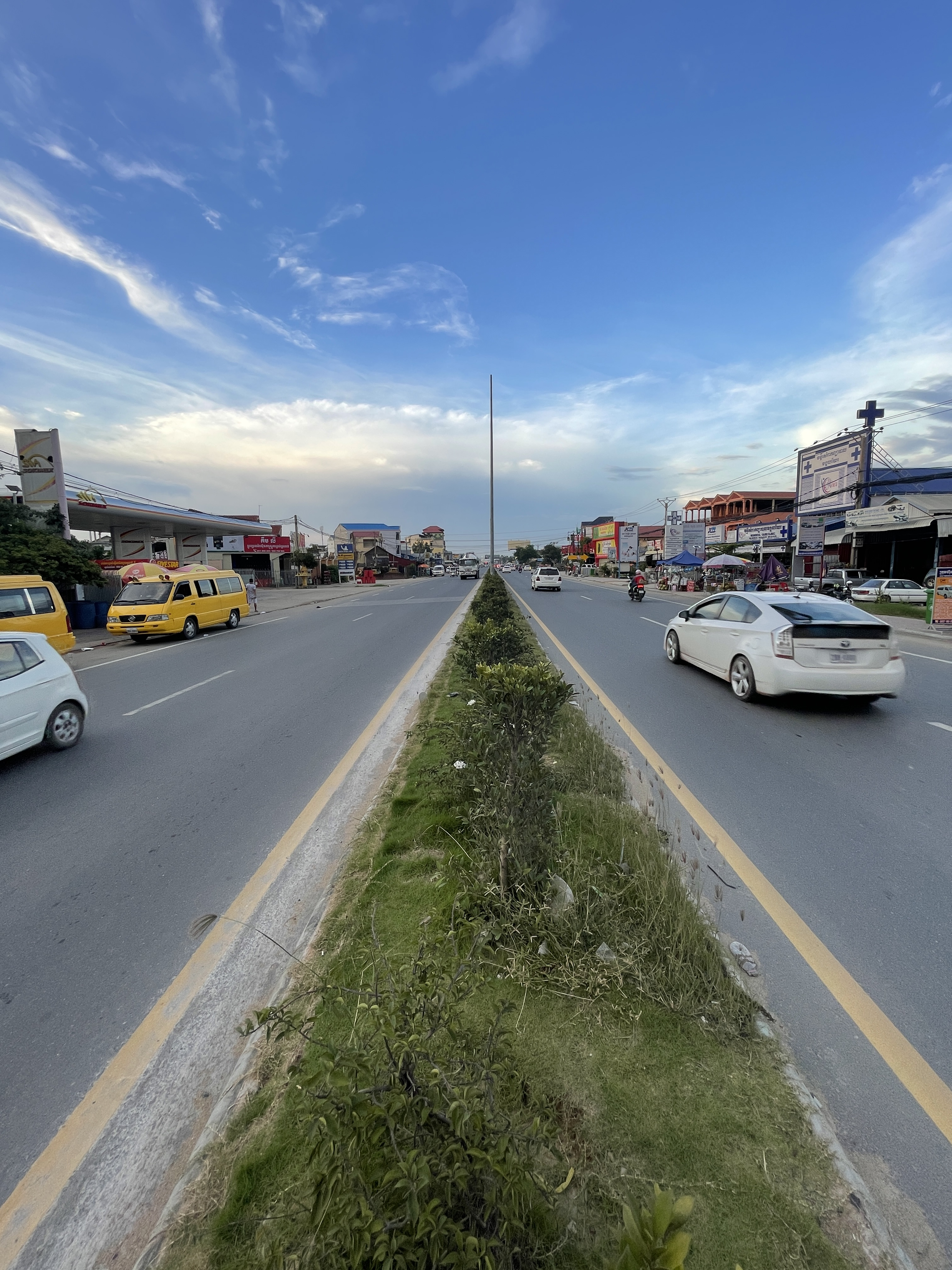
- National Highway 3 at Chom Chao Area

Location
- Country: Cambodia

Highway system
- Transport in Cambodia

National Highway 3 or National Road No.3 (10003) is one of the national highways of Cambodia. With a length of 202 km (126 mi), it connects the capital of Phnom Penh with Veal Renh. The road underwent significant refurbishment in 2008 and forms part of an international "North-South economic corridor" from Kunming in China to Bangkok in Thailand.
