= Outline of the Cayman Islands =

Overview of and topical guide to the Cayman Islands

The Flag of the Cayman Islands

The Coat of arms of the Cayman Islands

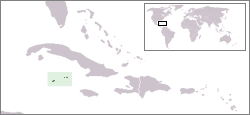
The location of the Cayman Islands

An enlargeable map of the Cayman Islands

The following outline is provided as an overview of and topical guide to the Cayman Islands:

Cayman Islands – British overseas territory located in the western Caribbean Sea, comprising the islands of Grand Cayman, Cayman Brac, and Little Cayman. It is a tax haven financial centre and one of the many scuba diving destinations in the Caribbean.

== General reference ==
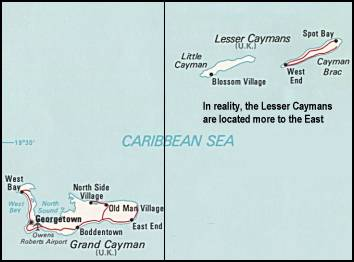
An enlargeable map of the Cayman Islands

- Pronunciation: /ðʉ ˈkaɪ.mɨn ˈaɪ.ləndz/
- Common English country name: The Cayman Islands
- Official English country name: The Cayman Islands
- Common endonym(s):
- Official endonym(s):
- Adjectival(s): Caymanian
- Demonym(s):
- ISO country codes: KY, CYM, 136
- ISO region codes: See ISO 3166-2:KY
- Internet country code top-level domain: .ky

== Geography of the Cayman Islands ==
Geography of the Cayman Islands

- The Cayman Islands are: a British overseas territory of three islands
- Location:
  - Northern Hemisphere and Western Hemisphere
    - North America (though not on the mainland)
  - Atlantic Ocean
    - North Atlantic
      - Caribbean
  - Time zone: UTC-05
  - Extreme points of the Cayman Islands
    - High: The Bluff on Cayman Brac 43 m (141 ft)
    - Low: Caribbean Sea 0 m
  - Land boundaries: none
  - Coastline: 160 km
- Population of the Cayman Islands: 62,000(2007) – 208th most populous country
- Area of the Cayman Islands: 260 square kilometres (100 sq mi) – 207th largest country
- Atlas of the Cayman Islands

=== Environment of the Cayman Islands ===
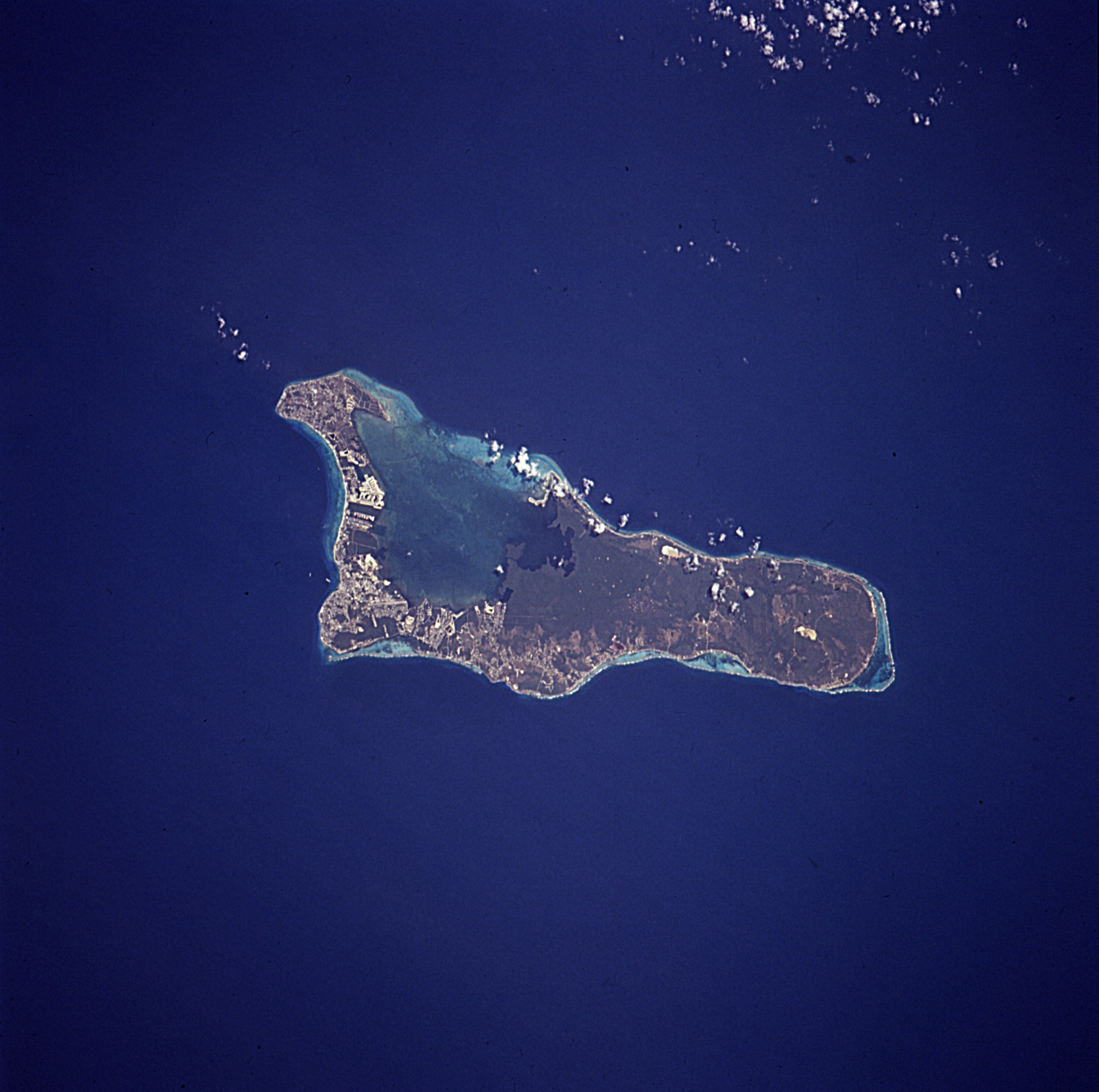
An enlargeable satellite image of Grand Cayman Island

- Climate of the Cayman Islands
- Renewable energy in the Cayman Islands
- Geology of the Cayman Islands
- Protected areas of the Cayman Islands
  - Biosphere reserves in the Cayman Islands
  - National parks of the Cayman Islands
- Wildlife of the Cayman Islands
  - Fauna of the Cayman Islands
    - Birds of the Cayman Islands
    - Mammals of the Cayman Islands

==== Natural geographic features of the Cayman Islands ====
- Fjords of the Cayman Islands
- Glaciers of the Cayman Islands
- Islands of the Cayman Islands
- Lakes of the Cayman Islands
- Mountains of the Cayman Islands
  - Volcanoes in the Cayman Islands
- Rivers of the Cayman Islands
  - Waterfalls of the Cayman Islands
- Valleys of the Cayman Islands
- World Heritage Sites in the Cayman Islands: None

=== Regions of the Cayman Islands ===
Regions of the Cayman Islands

==== Ecoregions of the Cayman Islands ====
List of ecoregions in the Cayman Islands

==== Administrative divisions of the Cayman Islands ====
None

===== Municipalities of the Cayman Islands =====
- Capital of the Cayman Islands: George Town
- Cities of the Cayman Islands

=== Demography of the Cayman Islands ===
Demographics of the Cayman Islands

== Government and politics of the Cayman Islands ==
Politics of the Cayman Islands

- Form of government: parliamentary representative democratic overseas territory
- Capital of the Cayman Islands: George Town
- Elections in the Cayman Islands
- Political parties in the Cayman Islands

=== Branches of the government of the Cayman Islands ===
Government of the Cayman Islands

==== Executive branch of the government of the Cayman Islands ====
- Head of state: Monarch of the United Kingdom, King Charles III
  - Monarch's representative: Governor of the Cayman Islands
- Head of government: Premier of the Cayman Islands
- Cabinet of the Cayman Islands

==== Legislative branch of the government of the Cayman Islands ====
- Legislative Assembly of the Cayman Islands (unicameral)

==== Judicial branch of the government of the Cayman Islands ====
Court system of the Cayman Islands

- Privy Council of the United Kingdom – the highest court to appeal to
  - Court of Appeal of the Cayman Islands – the highest court on the islands
    - Grand Court of the Cayman Islands
      - Chief Justice of the Cayman Islands

=== Foreign relations of the Cayman Islands ===
Foreign relations of the Cayman Islands

- Diplomatic missions in the Cayman Islands
- Diplomatic missions of the Cayman Islands
- Immigration to the Cayman Islands

==== International organization membership ====
The government of the Cayman Islands is a member of:

- Caribbean Community and Common Market (Caricom) (associate)
- Caribbean Development Bank (CDB)
- International Criminal Police Organization (Interpol) (subbureau)
- International Olympic Committee (IOC)
- United Nations Educational, Scientific, and Cultural Organization (UNESCO) (associate)
- Universal Postal Union (UPU)
- World Federation of Trade Unions (WFTU)

=== Law and order in the Cayman Islands ===
Law of the Cayman Islands

- Constitution of the Cayman Islands
- Crime in the Cayman Islands
- Human rights in the Cayman Islands
  - LGBT rights in the Cayman Islands
  - Freedom of religion in the Cayman Islands
- Law enforcement in the Cayman Islands

=== Military of the Cayman Islands ===
Military of the Cayman Islands

- Command
  - Commander-in-chief
    - Ministry of Defence of the Cayman Islands
- Forces
  - Army of the Cayman Islands
  - Navy of the Cayman Islands
  - Air Force of the Cayman Islands
  - Special forces of the Cayman Islands
- Military history of the Cayman Islands
- Military ranks of the Cayman Islands

=== Local government in the Cayman Islands ===
Local government in the Cayman Islands

== History of the Cayman Islands ==
History of the Cayman Islands

- Timeline of the history of the Cayman Islands
- Current events of the Cayman Islands
- Military history of the Cayman Islands

== Culture of the Cayman Islands ==
Culture of the Cayman Islands

- Architecture of the Cayman Islands
- Cuisine of the Cayman Islands
- Festivals in the Cayman Islands
- Languages of the Cayman Islands
- Media in the Cayman Islands
- National symbols of the Cayman Islands
  - Coat of arms of the Cayman Islands
  - Flag of the Cayman Islands
  - National anthem of the Cayman Islands
- People of the Cayman Islands
- Public holidays in the Cayman Islands
- Records of the Cayman Islands
- Religion in the Cayman Islands
  - Christianity in the Cayman Islands
  - Hinduism in the Cayman Islands
  - Islam in the Cayman Islands
  - Judaism in the Cayman Islands
  - Sikhism in the Cayman Islands
- World Heritage Sites in the Cayman Islands: None

=== Art in the Cayman Islands ===
- Art in the Cayman Islands
- Cinema of the Cayman Islands
- Literature of the Cayman Islands
- Music of the Cayman Islands
- Television in the Cayman Islands
- Theatre in the Cayman Islands

=== Sports in the Cayman Islands ===
Sports in the Cayman Islands

- Football in the Cayman Islands
- Cayman Islands at the Olympics
- Cayman Karting

== Economy and infrastructure of the Cayman Islands ==
Economy of the Cayman Islands

- Economic rank, by nominal GDP (2007): 151st (one hundred and fifty first)
- Agriculture in the Cayman Islands
- Banking in the Cayman Islands
  - National Bank of the Cayman Islands
- Communications in the Cayman Islands
  - Internet in the Cayman Islands
- Companies of the Cayman Islands
- Currency of the Cayman Islands: Dollar
  - ISO 4217: KYD
- Energy in the Cayman Islands
  - Energy policy of the Cayman Islands
  - Oil industry in the Cayman Islands
- Mining in the Cayman Islands
- Real estate in the Cayman Islands
- Cayman Islands Stock Exchange
- Tourism in the Cayman Islands
- Transport in the Cayman Islands
  - Airports in the Cayman Islands

== Education in the Cayman Islands ==
Education in the Cayman Islands

== See also ==
Cayman Islands

- Index of Cayman Islands-related articles
- List of Cayman Islands-related topics
- List of international rankings
- Outline of geography
- Outline of North America
- Outline of the Caribbean
- Outline of the United Kingdom
