= Index of Cayman Islands–related articles =

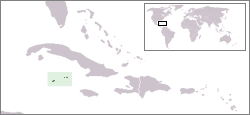
The location of the British Overseas Territory of the Cayman Islands

The following is an alphabetical list of topics related to the British Overseas Territory of the Cayman Islands.

Table of contents:

A B C D E F G H I J K L M N O P Q R S T U V W X Y Z

== 0–9 ==
A map of the Cayman Islands

- .ky – Internet country code top-level domain for the Cayman Islands
- 1932 Cuba Hurricane

== A ==
- Airports in the Cayman Islands
- Americas
  - North America
    - North Atlantic Ocean
      - West Indies
        - Caribbean Sea
          - Antilles
            - Lesser Antilles
              - Cayman Islands
- Anglo-America
- Antilles
- Atlas of the Cayman Islands

== B ==
- Birds of the Cayman Islands
- British Overseas Territory of the Cayman Islands

== C ==
- Capital of the Cayman Islands: George Town on Grand Cayman
- Caribbean
- Caribbean Community (CARICOM)
- Caribbean Sea
- Categories:
  - Category:Cayman Islands
    - Category:Buildings and structures in the Cayman Islands
    - Category:Cayman Islands-related lists
    - Category:Caymanian people
    - Category:Communications in the Cayman Islands
    - Category:Culture of the Cayman Islands
    - Category:Economy of the Cayman Islands
    - Category:Education in the Cayman Islands
    - Category:Environment of the Cayman Islands
    - Category:Geography of the Cayman Islands
    - Category:Government of the Cayman Islands
    - Category:Health in the Cayman Islands
    - Category:History of the Cayman Islands
    - Category:Law of the Cayman Islands
    - The Coat of arms of the Cayman Islands
    - Category:Politics of the Cayman Islands
    - Category:Society of the Cayman Islands
    - Category:Sport in the Cayman Islands
    - Category:Transport in the Cayman Islands
  - commons:Category:Cayman Islands
- Cayman Brac
- Cayman Islands
- Cayman Islands at the Olympics
- Cayman Islands national football team
- Cayman Islands Stock Exchange
- Cayman Motor Museum
- Chief Justice of the Cayman Islands
- Cities in the Cayman Islands
- Climate of the Cayman Islands
- Coat of arms of the Cayman Islands
- Commonwealth of Nations
- Communications in the Cayman Islands
- Culture of the Cayman Islands

== D ==
- Demographics of the Cayman Islands

== E ==
- Economy of the Cayman Islands
- Education in the Cayman Islands
- Elections in the Cayman Islands
- English colonization of the Americas
- English language

== F ==
The Flag of the Cayman Islands

- Flag of the Cayman Islands
- Foreign relations of the Cayman Islands

== G ==
- Geography of the Cayman Islands
- George Town on Grand Cayman – Capital of the Cayman Islands
- Government of the Cayman Islands
- Grand Cayman
- Gross domestic product

== H ==
- History of the Cayman Islands
- Hurricane Ivan

== I ==
- International Organization for Standardization (ISO)
  - ISO 3166-1 alpha-2 country code for the Cayman Islands: KY
  - ISO 3166-1 alpha-3 country code for the Cayman Islands: CYM
- Internet in the Cayman Islands
- Islands of the Cayman Islands:
  - Grand Cayman
    - Barkers Cay
    - Booby Cay
    - Duck Pond Cay
    - Finger Cay (now absorbed into Grand Cayman)
    - Sand Cay
    - Water Cay (now absorbed into Grand Cayman)
  - Little Cayman
    - Owen Island
  - Cayman Brac

== L ==
- Languages of the Cayman Islands
- Law enforcement in the Cayman Islands
- Law of the Cayman Islands
- Lesser Antilles
- LGBT rights in the Cayman Islands
- Little Cayman
- Lists related to the Cayman Islands:
  - List of airports in the Cayman Islands
  - List of birds of the Cayman Islands
  - List of Cayman Islands-related topics
  - List of cities in the Cayman Islands
  - List of countries by GDP (nominal)
  - List of Cayman Islands hurricanes
  - List of islands of the Cayman Islands
  - List of mammals in the Cayman Islands
  - List of political parties in the Cayman Islands
  - List of radio stations in Cayman Islands
  - List of schools in the Cayman Islands

== M ==
- Mammals in the Cayman Islands
- Military of the Cayman Islands
- Music of the Cayman Islands

== N ==
- North America
- Northern Hemisphere

== O ==
- Offshore financial centre

== P ==
- Politics of the Cayman Islands
  - List of political parties in the Cayman Islands

== R ==
- Radio stations in Cayman Islands
- Rugby union in the Cayman Islands

== S ==
- The Scout Association of the Cayman Islands
- Scuba diving in the Cayman Islands

== T ==
- Topic outline of the Cayman Islands
- Transport in the Cayman Islands
- Tropics

== U ==
- United Kingdom of Great Britain and Northern Ireland

== W ==
- West Indies
- Western Hemisphere
- Wikimedia Atlas of the Cayman Islands
- Wikipedia:WikiProject Topic outline/Drafts/Topic outline of the Cayman Islands

== See also ==
- List of Caribbean-related topics
- List of international rankings
- Lists of country-related topics
- Topic outline of geography
- Topic outline of North America
- Topic outline of the Cayman Islands
