= Public holidays in the Cayman Islands =

This is a list of public holidays in Cayman Islands.

Date	Name in English	Remarks
1 January	New Year's Day	will be moved to the next Monday, if on a weekend
Fourth Monday in January	National Heroes Day	A day to remember two National Heroes granted by government.
movable holiday	Ash Wednesday	
movable holiday	Good Friday	
movable holiday	Easter Monday	
First Monday in May	Emancipation Day	replaced Discovery Day starting in 2024. Discovery Day was on the third Monday in May
Third Monday in May	Discovery Day	replaced Emancipation Day starting in 2024. Emancipation Day was on the first Monday in May
movable holiday	King's Birthday	The Monday following the Saturday appointed in the United Kingdom as the official birthday of the reigning sovereign
First Monday in July	Constitution Day	
Second Monday in November	Remembrance Day	
25 December	Christmas Day	will be moved to the next Monday, if on a weekend
26 December	Boxing Day	will be moved to the next weekday after Christmas Day

Additionally the General elections at least since 2009 have also been a public holiday.
