= List of schools in the Cayman Islands =

This is a list of schools in the Cayman Islands.

== Primary schools ==
=== Grand Cayman ===
- Theoline L. McCoy Primary School
- Sir John A. Cumber Primary School
- Edna M. Moyle Primary School
- Marie Martin Primary School
- East End Primary School
- Joanna Clarke Primary School
- Red Bay Primary School
- Prospect Primary School

== Preschool & playschool in Cayman Islands ==
- Bloom Learning Centre
- Discovery Kids
- Island Montessori

=== Cayman Brac ===
- Creek and Spot Bay Infant School
- Creek and Spot Bay Junior School
- West End Primary School

=== Little Cayman ===
- Little Cayman Education Service

== Secondary schools ==
=== Grand Cayman ===
- John Gray High School
- Clifton Hunter High School
- Cayman Islands Further Education Centre

=== Cayman Brac ===
- Layman E. Scott Sr. High School

== Special schools ==
- Lighthouse School

== Private schools ==
- Cayman Academy
- Grace Christian Academy
- St. Ignatius Catholic School
- Cayman Prep and High School
- Cayman International School
- Triple C School
- Truth For Youth School
- First Baptist Christian School
- Calvary Baptist Christian Academy
- Wesleyan Christian Academy
- Hope Academy
- Island Primary
- Clever Fish School

== See also ==
- Education in the Cayman Islands
