= Military history of the Cayman Islands =

The defence of the Cayman Islands has been and currently remains the responsibility of the United Kingdom.

Before the independence of Jamaica in 1962, the Cayman Islands were under the same administration as Jamaica. As such, the responsibility of the defence of the Cayman Islands and Jamaica was provided by the United Kingdom and the British Garrison in Jamaica, now known as the Jamaica Defence Force. Since Jamaica's Independence, the Cayman Islands remain strongly with the United Kingdom and the defence of Cayman was retained solely by the United Kingdom.

== Colonial era ==
In 1662, the governor to Jamaica, Lord Windsor, was given royal instructions to take charge of the Cayman Islands by means of planning and raising fortifications in Cayman. Eventually, Fort George was built up around 1790. This is one of the earliest known military undertakings in the Cayman Islands.

== World War II ==
During World War II, a company of the Jamaican Home Guard was established in Grand Cayman in 1942. The Home Guard consisted of 44 officers and men.

Dobson Hall, the main barracks for the Home Guard in Cayman, was located in the capital George Town.

HMS Cayman, a Royal Navy Colony-class frigate, was launched during World War II on 6 September 1943. It was named after the Cayman Islands. The ship was used for patrol and escort duty during the war. After the war the ship was sold for scrapping on 1 July 1947.

The Cayman Company Home Guard was disbanded in 1945 after the war ended.

During World War II, the United States Government made agreements with the United Kingdom Government to establish a United States Naval Station in Grand Cayman. As German U-Boat activity decreased during the war, the naval base was handed over to the United States Coast Guard in 1945. The United States Coast Guard Station in Cayman was also eventually disbanded sometime after World War II.

== Present day ==
Many Caymanians served in the British Forces, as well as the United States Forces, and partook in many major conflicts around the world including the Falklands War, Vietnam War, Gulf War, Iraq, and Afghanistan. There are still a number of Caymanians serving in the UK and US Forces.

The United Kingdom regularly sends Royal Navy or Royal Fleet Auxiliary ships as a part of Atlantic Patrol (NORTH) tasking. These ships' main mission in the region is to maintain British Sovereignty for the Overseas Territories, humanitarian aid and disaster relief during disasters such as hurricanes, which are common in the area, and for counter-narcotic operations.

Also, the United States sometimes makes Cayman a port of call for Coast Guard cutters. On multiple occasions, the United States flies their military aircraft over the Caribbean, stopping at Grand Cayman's Owen Roberts International Airport and mostly continuing onwards back and forth to either USSOUTHCOM Joint Task Force Bravo base in Honduras or to Naval Air Station Key West.

On a couple of occasions, USSOUTHCOM Joint Task Force Bravo has deployed to the Caribbean during hurricane disaster relief operations using Grand Cayman as a forward operating base or staging area.

=== Establishment of the Cayman Islands Coast Guard ===
For many years, the Cayman Islands Government had been discussing, internally and with the British Government, the development of a Coast Guard to improve border control, counter-narcotic operations, and search-and-rescue capabilities. This became more urgent after a major incident with a boat missing at sea with children on board, which led to a major maritime search. This search, which was spearheaded by the Royal Cayman Islands Police Service Marine Unit along with the Jamaica Defence Force Coast Guard and the United States Coast Guard, ended with the boat found, one found dead all other persons lost and presumed drowned.

This led to a major inquiry on Cayman's capabilities in maritime search and rescue and border control. The inquiry led to a major push to get the Cayman Islands Coast Guard off the ground. In mid-2018, the Commander and Second in Command of the Coast Guard were appointed, with the first Coast Guard ship commissioned in late 2019, and operational in 2020.

The Coast Guard Commander and Second in Command took part in a joint operation with the United States Coast Guard and the Jamaica Defence Force Coast Guard known as Operation Riptide, making it the first Operation for the Cayman Islands Coast Guard.

=== Establishment of the Cayman Islands Regiment ===
For several years, talks in Cayman took place about the development of an auxiliary force to assist Cayman in major crises or times of disasters, like hurricanes. These talks increased and included the United Kingdom. In 2016–2019, the Atlantic hurricane seasons were disastrous for the region. The development of the Cayman Islands Regiment was finalized by 2019 with a visit from the UK Minister for the Armed Forces Mark Lancaster. Recruitment began in late 2019 and the Regiment became operational in 2020.
