= Georgette Ebanks =

Caymanian women's rights activist (1927–2023)

Georgette Ebanks (19 September 1927 – 17 October 2023) was a women's rights activist in the Cayman Islands. She played an important role in the establishment of women's right to vote in the country, which was passed into law in 1958.

== Biography ==
Born Georgette Hurlston on Grand Cayman on 19 September 1927, she was a member of the first graduating class of the Triple C School in George Town in 1947.

At age 21, Hurlston was one of the 24 signatories of the August 1948 petition demanding women's suffrage in the Cayman Islands. She was driven to participate in the suffrage movement, she later said, after thinking about "the opportunity I as a young woman at the time was missing out on." This first petition was rejected, and women were not granted the right to vote until 1958, by which point she had temporarily moved to the United States.

Georgette Ebanks was married to Nathan Ebanks, also of Grand Cayman. Back on the island, she joined the civil service as a postal worker, a role she held for nearly 30 years.

Ebanks was the only living signatory of that original petition prior to her death. She continued to engage in community organizing and politics into her nineties, participating in talk shows on the islands.

In 2017, she was given the first Ira Thompson Award by the Cayman Islands National Museum, in recognition of her contributions to the preservation of the Cayman Islands' history. An exhibit at the museum that launched in 2015, titled "Legends Gallery: Miss Georgette Ebanks," displays artifacts from her suffragist work and tells her story.

Ebanks died on 17 October 2023, at the age of 96.

== See also ==
- Women's suffrage in the Cayman Islands
