= Culture of the Cayman Islands =

The culture of the Cayman Islands has been influenced by Afro-Caribbeans of Jamaica, colonists of Great Britain. In the 21st century, approximately 113 nationalities make up the residents on the three islands comprising the country. The total population of the Cayman Islands is 81,546 people spread throughout the island group, with the majority of the people found on Grand Cayman. Roughly 37,000 are generational Caymanians, with the remainder being immigrants, their children, and permanent residents.

In the past, most of the people of the Cayman Islands got their livelihood from the sea through fishing, turtle harvesting, and as merchant seamen. Cayman Sea Salt and Cayman Logwood products are now locally made and exported. In the 21st century the islands have thrived in the finance and tourism sectors.

== Religion ==
The influences of American and European culture are most evident in the religion of the Cayman Islands, where Christianity is the most practiced religion. Within the island group, Christian denominations include Anglican, Baptist, Catholicism, Church of God, Presbyterian, and United Church, among others. Because religion is an important aspect of the culture of the Cayman Islands, most of the local businesses as well as the harbors and ports are closed on Sundays. The same establishments are closed on Christmas days. The Cayman Islands also hosts a growing Jewish community, with spearheading the community as the most well known rabbi on the island.

== Language ==
British English is the most commonly spoken language in the Cayman Islands, albeit with a distinctive Caymanian dialect. Jamaican patois is also commonly spoken in the Cayman Islands, and younger Caymanian generations have adopted certain Jamaican terms and expressions.

== Cuisine ==
The food of the Cayman Islands includes traditional Afro-Caribbean fare such as cassava, johnny cake, breadfruit, plantain, and meat pie. Jamaican cuisine has also been an influence in the Cayman Islands, and jerk seasoning has come into common use on meat dishes such as chicken, fish and pork. Curry is also used frequently in rice, chicken, and fish dishes. Traditional Caymanian fare includes dishes made from turtle meat, conch, goat, and fish such as grouper and snapper, with locally produced Cayman sea salt.

== See also ==
- Music of the Cayman Islands
- Scuba diving in the Cayman Islands
