= Leila Ross-Shier =

Caymanian musician and educator (1886–1968)

Leila Elberta Ross-Shier (born McTaggart; 16 November 1886 – 26 September 1968) was a musician, educator and composer from the Cayman Islands. Ross-Shier wrote the national song of the Cayman Islands, "Beloved Isle Cayman".

== Biography ==
Ross-Shier was born on 16 November 1886, in Grand Cayman. She worked as an educator, librarian and was an official Registrar of Births and Deaths. She encouraged all high school students to read, no matter the color of their skin, despite the norm of segregation at the time.

Ross-Shier wrote "Beloved Isle Cayman" in 1930. She also wrote hymns and ballads, organized concerts and was a church organist.

Ross-Shier was one of the signers of a petition that led to granting women's suffrage in the Cayman Islands in 1959.

Ross-Shier died on 26 September 1968, in Grand Cayman.
