= Fauna of the Cayman Islands =

Native animals of the Cayman Islands

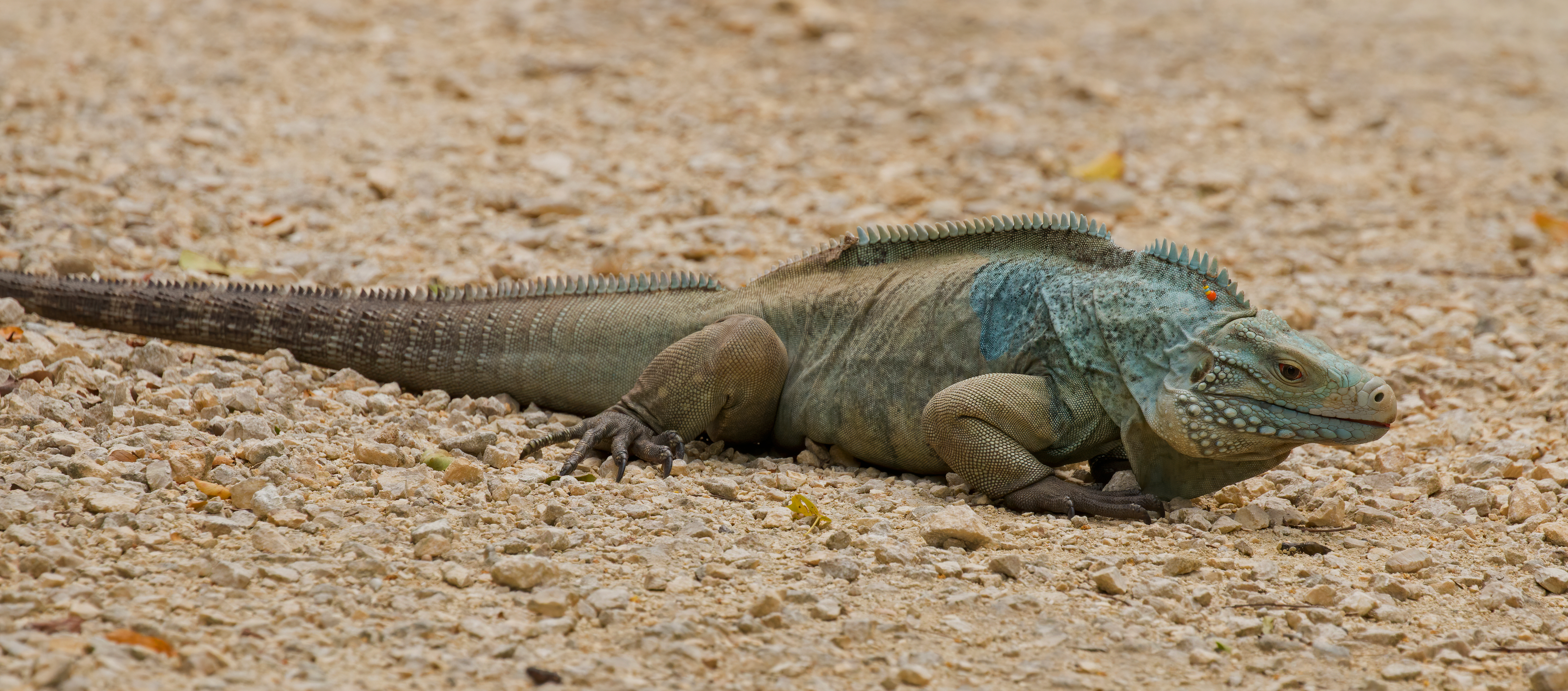
Blue iguana

The Fauna of the Cayman Islands include species unique to the islands, including the blue iguana, also known as the Grand Cayman iguana (Cyclura lewisi) .

== See also ==
- List of birds of the Cayman Islands
- List of butterflies of the Cayman Islands
