= Women's suffrage in the Cayman Islands =

Women's suffrage in the Cayman Islands was granted in 1959. Women created two separate petitions for women's suffrage and sent them to the government in 1948 and in 1957 to request the right to vote. The right to vote in the Cayman Islands was signed into law as Law 2 of 1959.

== History ==
The fight for women's suffrage in the Cayman Islands began in George Town, when 24 women, including Georgette Hurlston, sent a letter to the Commissioner on 19 August 1948, informing him that they intended to vote. There had been no law preventing women from voting, but they still had not been voting in elections. The wording of existing laws used the word "people" which the women who wrote the 1948 petition drew on, pointing out that this did not exclude women. This first group of women was not allowed to vote, being "told they did not have a constitutional right to vote." There was also the custom of the word people only applying to men.

In 1954, the issue of women participating in elections was brought up to the Colonial Secretary by Acting Attorney General, I.H. Cruchley. Cruchley argued that "words importing the masculine gender shall include females."

Another petition for the right to vote was sent on 29 May 1957 and had 358 signatures. This petition was given to the Legislative Assembly of Justices and Vestrymen. The Colonial Secretary requested that a law be formed regarding the rights of women to vote. The legislative assembly also agreed that women should be allowed to vote, deciding in October 1958. On 8 December 1958, a law was passed that removed any disqualifications for women to vote. This law became Law 2 of 1959.

== See also ==
- Women's suffrage in the United Kingdom
