= Geology of the Cayman Islands =

The geology of the Cayman Islands includes carbonates deposited and periodically eroded over the last 30 million years. The underlying Cayman Ridge is proposed as an uplifted fault block. The oldest rocks are believed to be granodiorite, followed by a cap of basalt. Situated near the Oriente Transform Fault and the Mid-Cayman Rise, the islands are tectonically active. Older Miocene and Pliocene crystalline limestone is overlain by the Pleistocene Ironshore Formation reef limestone and calcarenite.
