= Discovery Day =

Holiday commemorating significant national discovery

Discovery Day is the name of several holidays commemorating the discovery of land, gold, and other significant national discoveries.

== The Bahamas ==
The Bahamas Discovery Day was a public holiday on October 12, that celebrated the arrival of Christopher Columbus in the New World in 1492. It coincided with the Columbus Day celebrations of many other countries in the Americas. Columbus's initial landfall was on the now-unknown island of Guanahani in the Bahamas in 1492.

It was last observed as a holiday in 2012 and has been replaced by National Heroes' Day holiday, which is a public holiday observed on the second Monday in October.

== Brazil ==
In Brazil, Discovery Day is observed on April 22 each year. This date commemorates the day when Pedro Álvares Cabral became the first European to land in Brazil in 1500 (although this discovery is contested by some).

== Canada ==
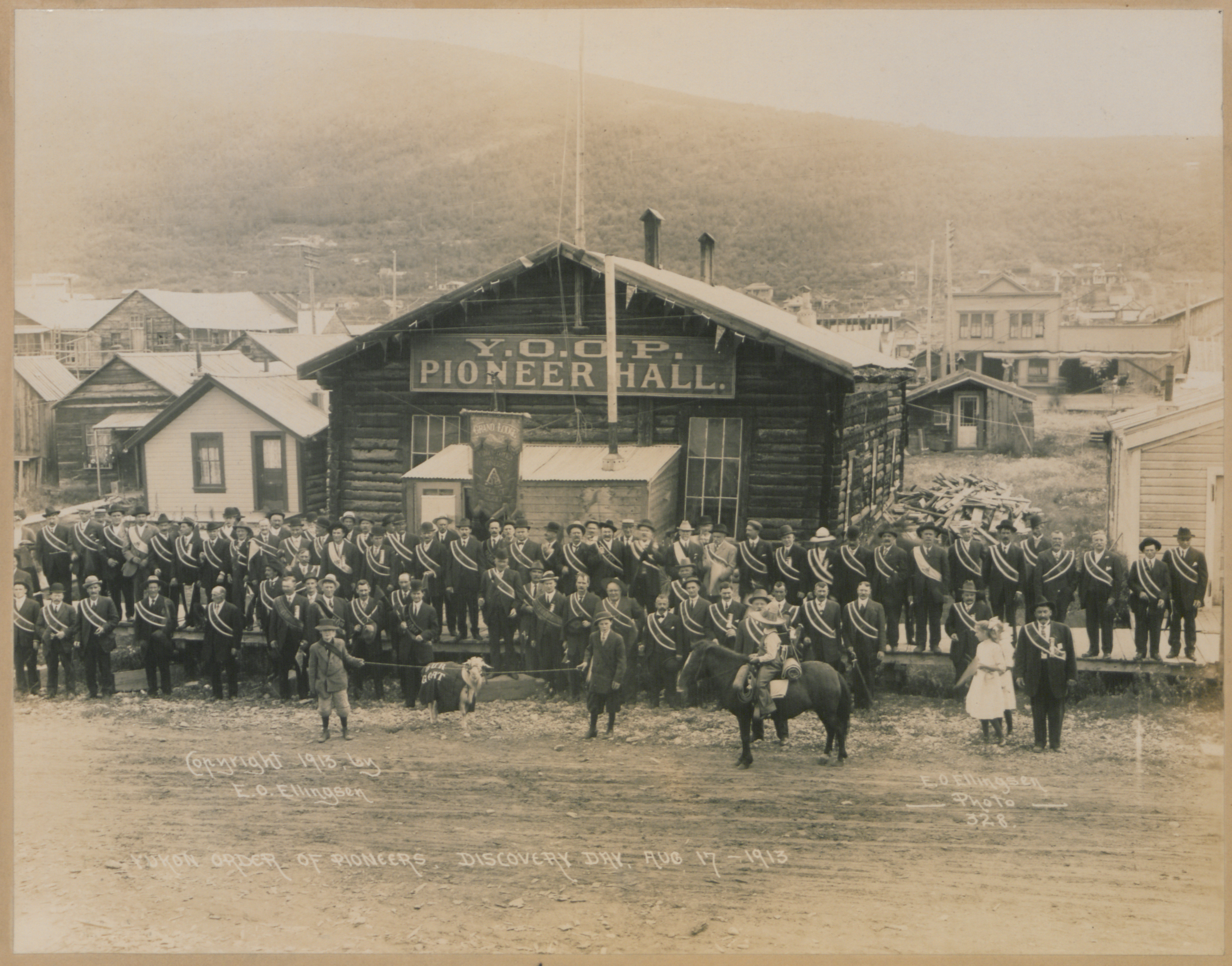
Yukon Order of Pioneers, Discovery Day August 17, 1913.

In Yukon, Discovery Day is a public holiday on the third Monday in August commemorating the anniversary of the discovery of gold in 1896, which started the Klondike Gold Rush.

In Newfoundland and Labrador, it is observed on the Monday nearest June 24 and commemorates John Cabot's discovery of Newfoundland in 1497. In June 2020, it was announced that the name of the holiday would be changed in consultation with Indigenous groups in the province. As of 2026 no new name has been assigned, and it still has the temporarily designated name of "June Holiday".

== Cayman Islands ==
Discovery Day in the Cayman Islands commemorates the discovery of the Sister Islands of Cayman Brac and Little Cayman by Christopher Columbus in 1503. The public holiday is celebrated on the third Monday in May.

== Guam ==
March 6 marks the day in 1521 that Magellan's expedition dropped anchor in Umatac Bay.

== Hispaniola ==
December 5, the date in 1492 when Christopher Columbus landed on the island of Hispaniola in what is now Môle-Saint-Nicolas, Haiti, is called Discovery Day. Today the island is shared by two countries: Haiti and the Dominican Republic which both recognize the holiday.

== Puerto Rico ==
In Puerto Rico, November 19, the date in 1493 when explorer Christopher Columbus landed on the main island during his second voyage, is an official holiday since 1938. It was known as Día del Descubrimiento de Puerto Rico (Puerto Rico Discovery Day) from 1938 to 2014, and Día de la Cultura Puertorriqueña y el Descubrimiento de Puerto Rico (Puerto Rican Culture and the Puerto Rico Discovery Day) from 2014 to 2022. Since then, it is known as Día de la Puertorriqueñidad (Puerto Rican Day). It is not to be confused with Columbus Day, which is celebrated on the 2nd Monday of October in the United States, including the unincorporated territory of Puerto Rico.
