= Sikhism in the Cayman Islands =

Total population
- 200

Religions
- Sikhism

Languages
- English • Punjabi

Sikhs in the Cayman Islands are a religious minority in Cayman Islands. There is estimated to be 200 Sikhs living there.

== History ==
Whilst there is little history on Sikhs in the Cayman Islands, most migration has been driven by professional opportunities in finance, construction, tourism, and other industries.

Ishan Singh is a Sikh community representative on the island.

In 2013, the Sikh community held a food and toy drive to celebrate the Gurpurb of Guru Nanak.

== Gurdwara ==
There is no available Gurdwara on the Cayman Islands. The Sikh community meet periodically for religious congregations and community work.

== See also ==
- Asian Caymanians
- Sikhism in the United Kingdom
- Sikhism in the United States
- Sikhism in Panama
- Cayman Islands–India relations
