= Music of the Cayman Islands =

The music of the Cayman Islands, a Caribbean island chain, includes a wide selection of international pop music as well as unique folk styles. The Cayman National Cultural Foundation, established in 1984, helps to preserve and promote Cayman folk music, including the organisation of festivals such as Cayman Islands International Storytelling Festival, the Cayman JazzFest, Seafarers Festival and Cayfest. There is also a Pirate's Week Festival. The Cayman JazzFest, founded in 2004, is a well-known jazz festival, that draws on the islands' "deep connection" with jazz.

The official national anthem of the Cayman Islands is "God Save the Queen". "Beloved Isle Cayman", words and music by organist Leila Ross-Shier is the official national song.

The fiddle is a popular folk instrument. Christmas music is an important part of the Cayman folk tradition, and it consists of serenading, or group singing of Christmas carols on Christmas Eve. Instruments include the fiddle, accordion, mouth organ, grater and drums.
