= Wesleyan Christian Academy (Cayman Islands) =

School in the Cayman Islands

Location
- 150 Northwest Point Rd. Grand Cayman; Cayman Islands
- Coordinates: 19.3721°N 81.4076°W

Information
- Website: wcacayman.com

Wesleyan Christian Academy is a private Christian school in West Bay, Grand Cayman, Cayman Islands. It serves grade levels K4-12. As of 2016 there are 130 students. The school was established in 1977.
