= Telecommunications in the Cayman Islands =

Communications in the Cayman Islands

== Telephone ==
Telephones – main lines in use: 37,400 (2009)

Telephones – mobile cellular: 99,900 (2004)

Telephone system:

Domestic: Reasonably good overall telephone system with a high fixed-line teledensity. Liberalization of telecom market in 2003; introduction of competition in the mobile-cellular market in 2004. FLOW Cayman, Digicel
International: The Cayman Islands have landing points for the MAYA-1, and the Cayman-Jamaica Fiber System submarine cables that provide links to the US and parts of Central and South America. Service on both of these cables are controlled by Liberty Latin America.

Satellite earth station – 1 Intelsat (Atlantic Ocean) (2007) Intelsat (Atlantic Ocean)

== Radio ==
Radio broadcast stations: AM 0, FM 17, shortwave 0 (2006)

- List of radio stations in Cayman Islands

Radios: 36,000 (1997)

== Television ==
Television broadcast stations: Cayman27

== Internet ==
Internet Service Providers (ISPs):Four companies offer internet service in the islands with in fixed configurations or mobile or both:

- Liberty Latin America d/b/a FLOW
- Digicel
- Logic - Fibre based service. Founded in 2004 as WestTel when it was granted a telecommunications license. Purchased TeleCayman in 2013
- C3

Country code (Top-level domain): .ky
