= List of cities in the Cayman Islands =

List of cities in the Cayman Islands

- George Town (capital) - pop. 31,785
- West Bay - pop. 11,436
- Bodden Town - pop. 6,918
- East End - pop. 1,552
- North Side - pop. 1,902
- West End - pop. 1,000
- Old Man Village - pop. 200

== Sources ==
- Population Source - World Gazetteer
