= Scuba diving in the Cayman Islands =

Recreational diving tourism destination

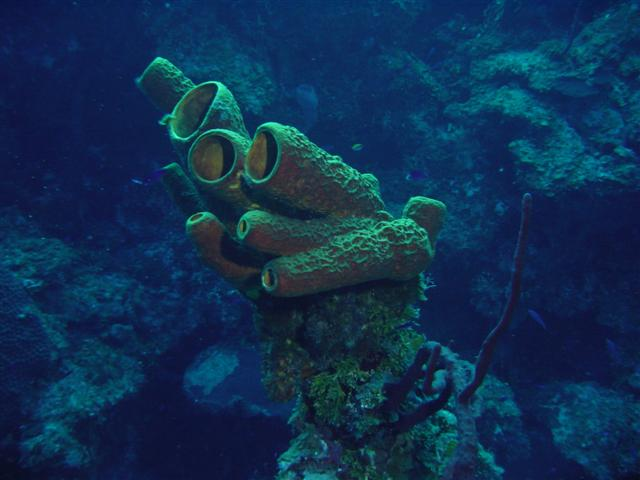
A Marine sponge photograph taken in the Cayman Islands

The three islands of the Cayman Islands are the exposed top of an underwater mountain. Underwater, the sides of this mountain are quite steep, vertical in some places, within as little as a few hundred metres from shore.

In addition to the expected coral reefs, colourful fish, and other underwater creatures, scuba divers can also partake in "wall diving" in the Cayman Islands and many of the sites contain tunnels and "grottos" that provide penetration opportunities for experienced divers. Scuba diving in the Caymans can be done by boat or directly from shore.

The tourism industry on the Cayman Islands caters to divers, with many resorts and condominium complexes having in-house diving operations offering course work, daily excursions, scuba equipment sales and rentals.

== Grand Cayman ==
The diving on Grand Cayman is divided roughly into 4 areas; Seven Mile Beach and the Northwest Point, The North Wall, The South Side, and The East End, with 245 dive sites. Due to the prevailing southeast winds, it is rare to dive the South Side dive sites, though it is possible. Popular dive sites include the Kittiwake, which is located on the northwestern tip of Seven Mile Beach, and the 12-foot divesite of Stingray City.

Visibility is exceptionally good due to the island's geography. There is very little runoff of silt or fertilizers from the land, and the steep walls result in the reefs being unusually close to deep ocean water.

Marine life in Grand Cayman includes tarpon, silversides, French angelfish, and Barrel Sponges, among others.

== Cayman Brac and Little Cayman ==
Both of the 'sister islands' are thin strips of land lying roughly east to west, and the diving is divided between the north and south sides. Because of the prevailing southeast winds, it is rare to dive on the south side of these islands. Cayman Brac features over 50 dive sites. The MV Capt. Keith Tibbets, the only Russian warship available to divers in the Western hemisphere, is located on Cayman Brac. Cayman Brac also has an additional 11 dive sites reachable by shore. On Little Cayman, 'Bloody Bay Wall' and 'Jackson Bay' are dive destinations. Little Cayman features shallow dives as low at 20 feet and as deep as 6,000 feet. They are both situated on the north side of the island and are not accessible year-round because of weather conditions.
