= .ky =

Internet country code top-level domain for the Cayman Islands

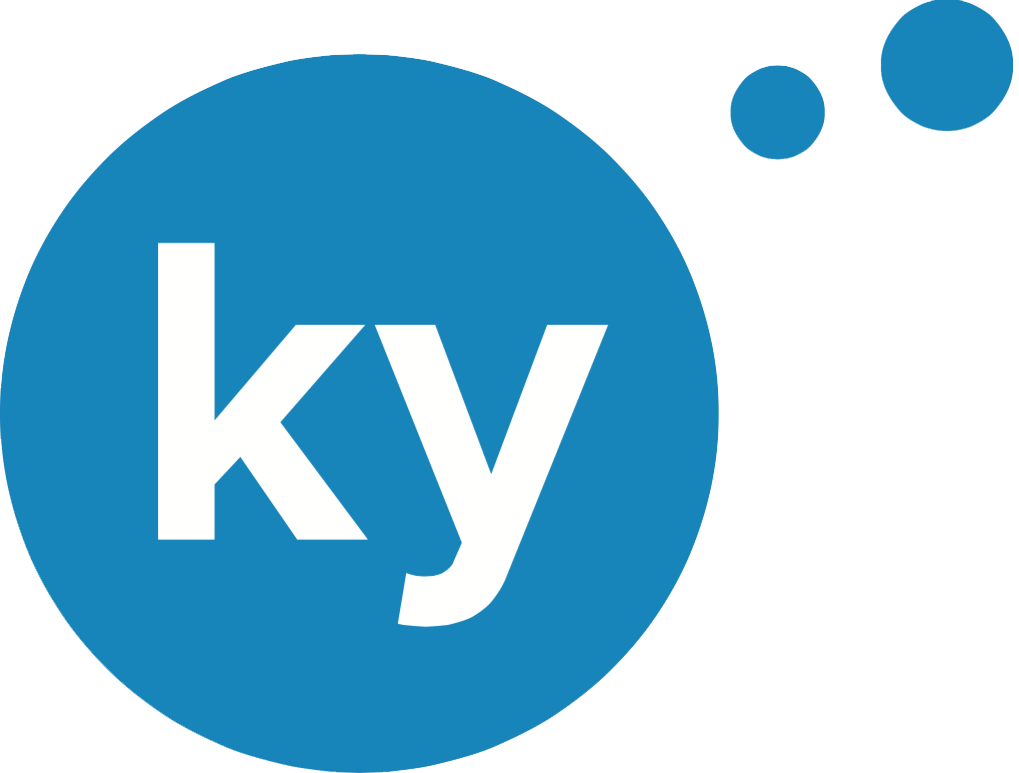
- Introduced: 3 May 1995
- TLD type: Country code top-level domain
- Status: Active
- Registry: GoDaddy
- Sponsor: Utility Regulation and Competition Office
- Intended use: Entities connected with the Cayman Islands
- Actual use: Gets some use in Cayman Islands
- Registration restrictions: None after 2015, anyone can register a domain.
- Structure: Registrations are made directly at second level, or at third level beneath several second-level names
- Documents: Policies
- Dispute policies: UDRP
- Registry website: Registry site

.ky is the Internet country code top-level domain (ccTLD) for the Cayman Islands. The code was chosen as other possible options had already been allocated. Registration was limited to residents and registered companies in the Cayman Islands with a local address, but this restriction was removed in September 2015. The Cayman Islands also has the international three-letter code CYM and has won a bid to be awarded the .cym domain in a future expansion of the top-level domain space.

== Second level domains ==
Registrations are permitted directly at the second level, or at the third level beneath these names:

- com.ky
- org.ky
- net.ky
- edu.ky (restricted to educational institutions)
- gov.ky (restricted to governmental entities)

== History ==
IANA received a request to establish the .ky ccTLD in April 1995. From 1995 to 2002, the .ky ccTLD registry was operated by an individual, Clint Mole, initially as an employee of the Cayman Islands government, but then later under contract with a company Domain Name Trust (DNT). In 2002, the Cayman Islands government established the Information and Communications Technical Authority (ICTA) and contacted ICANN requesting that administrative operation be changed to ICTA. In June 2003, IANA and ICANN concluded that the .ky ccTLD should be redelegated to ICTA.

In January 2015 the Cayman Islands ICTA announced a partnership with Uniregistry for the operation of the .ky name extension. Uniregistry became the exclusive accredited registrar to retail .ky names on 2 March 2015.

In February 2020 GoDaddy announced that it had acquired Uniregistry's registrar business and with it the exclusive .ky deal.

== See also ==
- Internet in the Cayman Islands
- Internet in the United Kingdom
- .uk
