= List of mammals of the Cayman Islands =

This is a list of the mammal species recorded in the Cayman Islands. There are the mammal species in the Cayman Islands, of which one is believed to be threatened.

The following tags are used to highlight each species' conservation status as assessed by the International Union for Conservation of Nature:

EX	Extinct	No reasonable doubt that the last individual has died.
EW	Extinct in the wild	Known only to survive in captivity or as a naturalized populations well outside its previous range.
CR	Critically endangered	The species is in imminent risk of extinction in the wild.
EN	Endangered	The species is facing an extremely high risk of extinction in the wild.
VU	Vulnerable	The species is facing a high risk of extinction in the wild.
NT	Near threatened	The species does not meet any of the criteria that would categorise it as risking extinction but it is likely to do so in the future.
LC	Least concern	There are no current identifiable risks to the species.
DD	Data deficient	There is inadequate information to make an assessment of the risks to this species.

== Subclass: Theria ==
=== Infraclass: Eutheria ===
==== Order: Sirenia (manatees and dugongs) ====
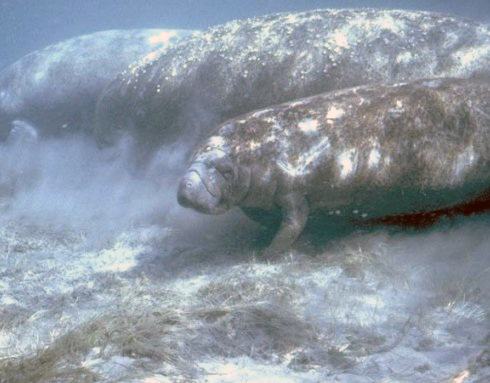
West Indian manatees

Sirenia is an order of fully aquatic, herbivorous mammals that inhabit rivers, estuaries, coastal marine waters, swamps, and marine wetlands. All four species are endangered.

- Family: Trichechidae
  - Genus: Trichechus
    - West Indian manatee, T. manatus VU

==== Order: Chiroptera (bats) ====
The bats' most distinguishing feature is that their forelimbs are developed as wings, making them the only mammals capable of flight. Bat species account for about 20% of all mammals.

- Family: Molossidae
  - Genus: Molossus
    - Velvety free-tailed bat, Molossus molossus LC
  - Genus: Tadarida
    - Mexican free-tailed bat, Tadarida brasiliensis LC
- Family: Phyllostomidae
  - Subfamily: Phyllostominae
    - Genus: Macrotus
      - Waterhouse's leaf-nosed bat, Macrotus waterhousii LC
  - Subfamily: Brachyphyllinae
    - Genus: Brachyphylla
      - Cuban fruit-eating bat, Brachyphylla nana NT
  - Subfamily: Phyllonycterinae
    - Genus: Erophylla
      - Buffy flower bat, Erophylla sezekorni LC
  - Subfamily: Stenodermatinae
    - Genus: Artibeus
      - Jamaican fruit bat, Artibeus jamaicensis LC
    - Genus: Phyllops
      - Cuban fig-eating bat, Phyllops falcatus LC
  - Family: Vespertilionidae
    - Genus: Eptesicus
      - Big brown bat, Eptesicus fuscus LC

==== Order: Rodentia (rodents) ====
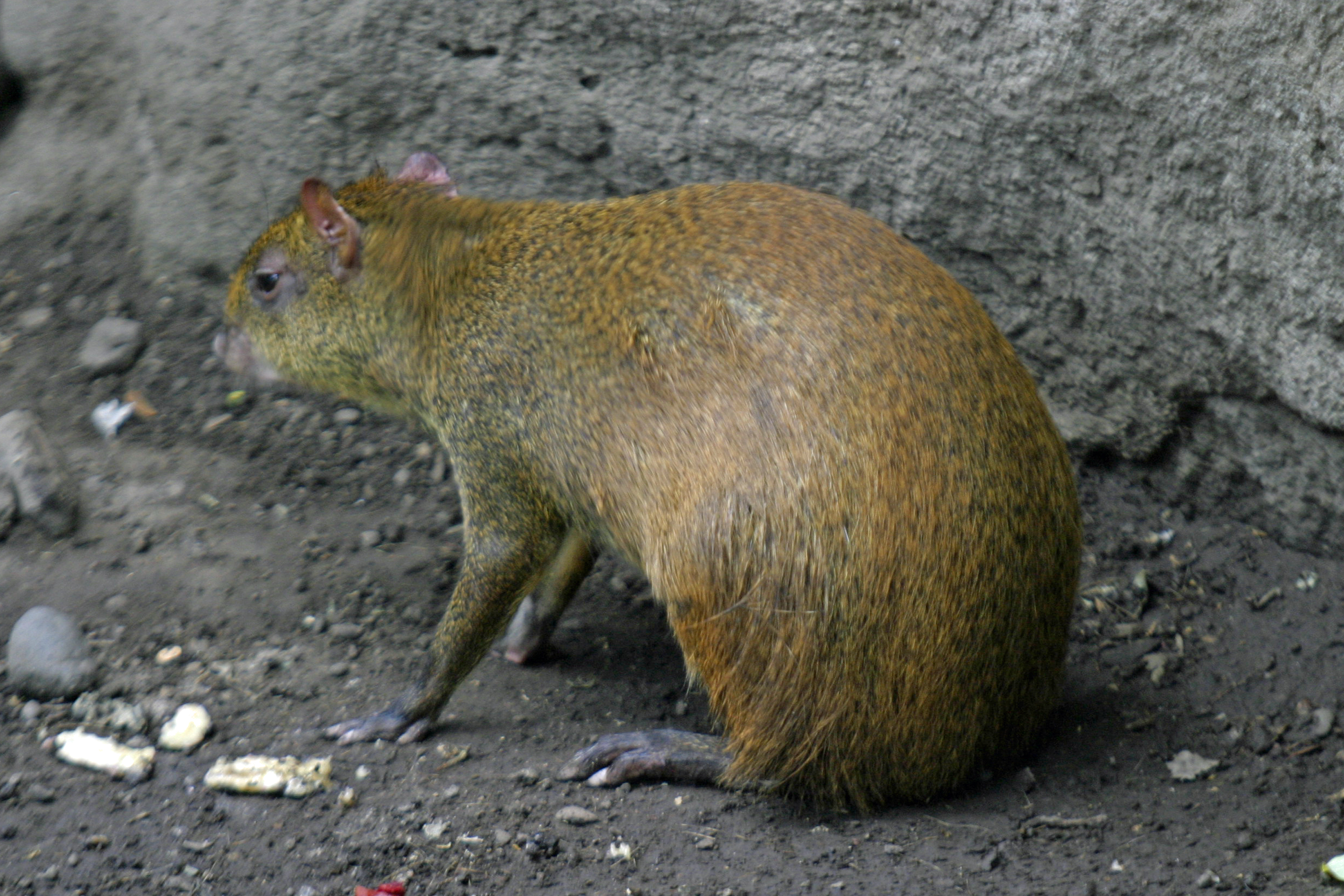
Central American agouti

Rodentia is an order of mammals characterised by two continuously growing incisors in the upper and lower jaws which must be kept short by gnawing. Rodents make up 40% of mammal species, and they are found in vast numbers on all continents other than Antarctica. Rodents have sharp incisors that they use to gnaw wood, break into food, and bite predators. Most eat seeds or plants, though some have more varied diets. Some species have historically been pests, eating seeds stored by people and spreading disease.

The name comes from the Latin word rodens, "gnawing one" (from the verb rodere, "gnaw").

In terms of number of species—although not necessarily in terms of number of organisms (population) or biomass—rodents make up the largest order of mammals. There are about 2,277 species of rodents (Wilson and Reeder, 2005), with over 40% of mammalian species belonging to the order.

The Central American agouti has been introduced to the Cayman Islands, and are found in forests, thick brush, savannas, and cultivated areas.

- Family: Dasyproctidae
  - Genus: Dasyprocta
    - Central American agouti, Dasyprocta punctata (I) LC
- Family: Echimyidae
  - Genus: Capromys
    - Desmarest's hutia, Capromys pilorides subspecies lewisi (EX)

==== Order: Cetacea (whales) ====
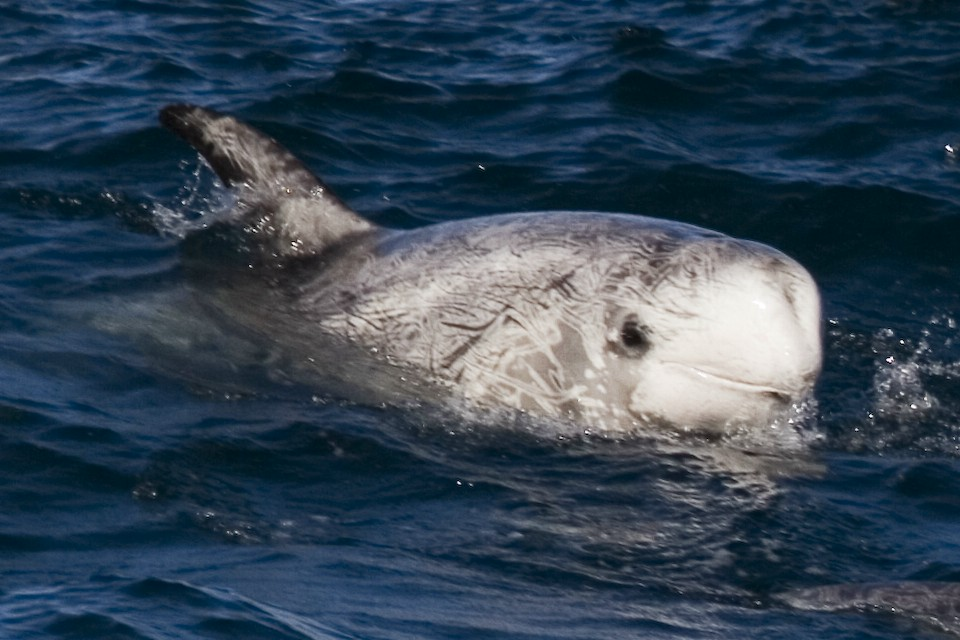
Risso's dolphin

The order Cetacea includes whales, dolphins and porpoises. They are the mammals most fully adapted to aquatic life with a spindle-shaped nearly hairless body, protected by a thick layer of blubber, and forelimbs and tail modified to provide propulsion underwater.

- Suborder: Mysticeti
  - Family: Balaenopteridae (baleen whales)
    - Genus: Balaenoptera
      - Common minke whale, Balaenoptera acutorostrata
      - Sei whale, Balaenoptera borealis
      - Bryde's whale, Balaenoptera brydei
      - Blue whale, Balaenoptera musculus
    - Genus: Megaptera
      - Humpback whale, Megaptera novaeangliae
- Suborder: Odontoceti
  - Superfamily: Platanistoidea
    - Family: Delphinidae (marine dolphins)
      - Genus: Delphinus
        - Short-beaked common dolphin, Delphinus delphis DD
      - Genus: Feresa
        - Pygmy killer whale, Feresa attenuata DD
      - Genus: Globicephala
        - Short-finned pilot whale, Globicephala macrorhyncus DD
      - Genus: Lagenodelphis
        - Fraser's dolphin, Lagenodelphis hosei DD
      - Genus: Grampus
        - Risso's dolphin, Grampus griseus DD
      - Genus: Orcinus
        - Killer whale, Orcinus orca DD
      - Genus: Peponocephala
        - Melon-headed whale, Peponocephala electra DD
      - Genus: Pseudorca
        - False killer whale, Pseudorca crassidens DD
      - Genus: Stenella
        - Pantropical spotted dolphin, Stenella attenuata DD
        - Clymene dolphin, Stenella clymene DD
        - Striped dolphin, Stenella coeruleoalba DD
        - Atlantic spotted dolphin, Stenella frontalis DD
        - Spinner dolphin, Stenella longirostris DD
      - Genus: Steno
        - Rough-toothed dolphin, Steno bredanensis DD
      - Genus: Tursiops
        - Common bottlenose dolphin, Tursiops truncatus
    - Family: Physeteridae (sperm whales)
      - Genus: Physeter
        - Sperm whale, Physeter catodon DD
    - Family: Kogiidae (dwarf sperm whales)
      - Genus: Kogia
        - Pygmy sperm whale, Kogia breviceps DD
        - Dwarf sperm whale, Kogia sima DD
  - Superfamily Ziphioidea
    - Family: Ziphidae (beaked whales)
      - Genus: Mesoplodon
        - Gervais' beaked whale, Mesoplodon europaeus DD
      - Genus: Ziphius
        - Cuvier's beaked whale, Ziphius cavirostris DD

==== Order: Carnivora (carnivorans) ====
There are over 260 species of carnivorans, the majority of which feed primarily on meat. They have a characteristic skull shape and dentition.

- Suborder: Pinnipedia
  - Family: Phocidae (earless seals)
    - Genus: Neomonachus
      - Caribbean monk seal, Neomonachus tropicalis EX

== See also ==
- List of chordate orders
- Lists of mammals by region
- List of prehistoric mammals
- Mammal classification
- List of mammals described in the 2000s
