= Beloved Isle Cayman =

Regional anthem of the Cayman Islands

- Territorial anthem of the Cayman Islands
- Lyrics: Leila Ross-Shier
- Music: Leila Ross-Shier
- Adopted: 1993

"Beloved Isle Cayman" is the official national song of the Cayman Islands, composed by Leila Ross-Shier in 1930. It became the official national song when the Cayman Islands Coat of Arms, Flag and National Song Law was passed in 1993.

As a British Overseas Territory, the official national anthem is "God Save the King".

== See also ==
- List of British anthems
