= List of birds of the Cayman Islands =

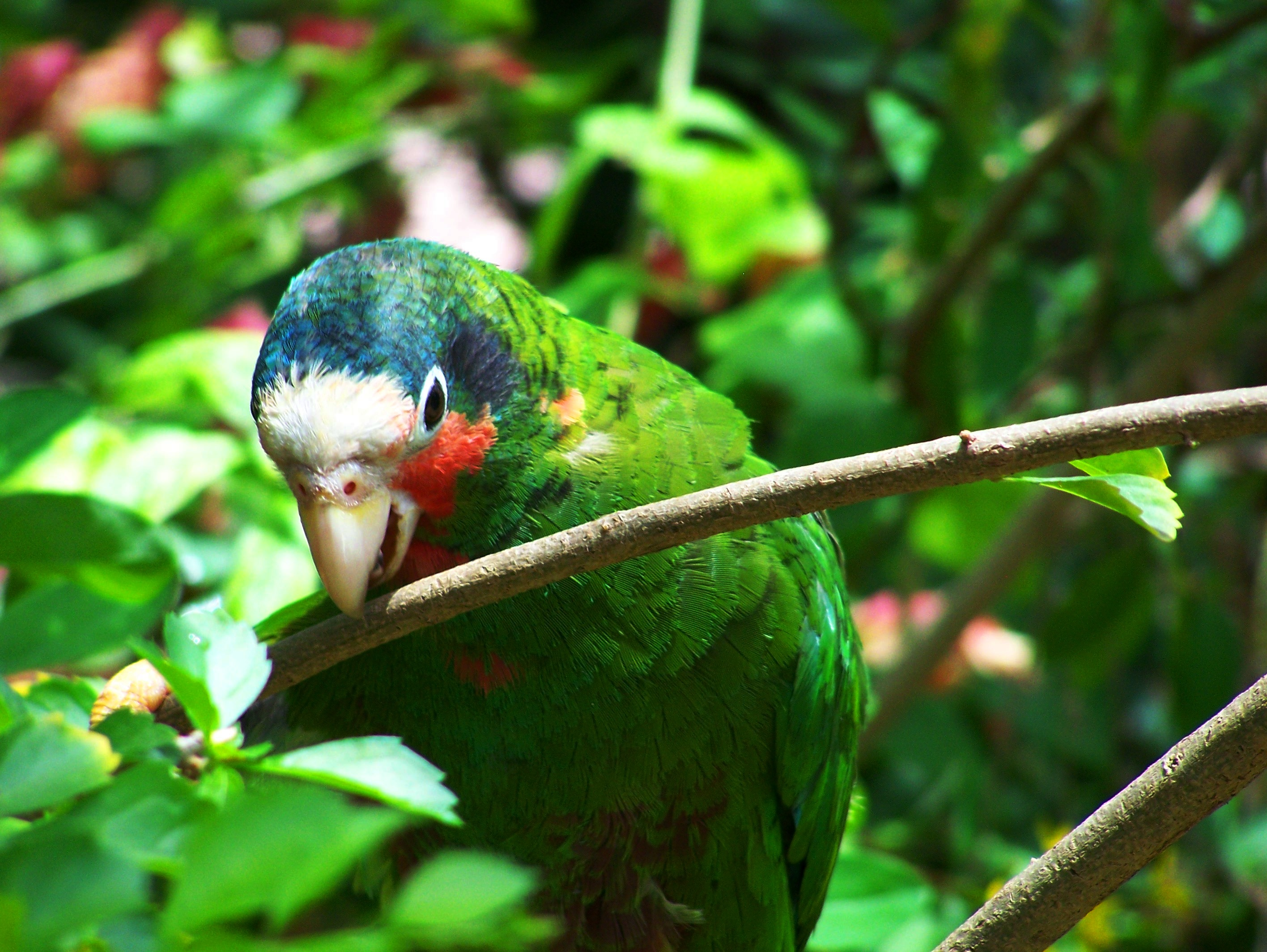
The Grand Cayman parrot is the national bird of the Cayman Islands.

This is a list of the bird species recorded in the Cayman Islands. The avifauna of the Cayman Islands included a total of 270 species, according to Bird Checklists of the World as of May 2023. Of them, 163 are rare or accidental and eight are introduced. One species (Grand Cayman thrush) was endemic to the islands but is now extinct, and one species (Jamaican oriole) has been extirpated. BirdLife International has reclassified Grand Cayman's endemic Cuban bullfinch subspecies as a full species, the Grand Cayman bullfinch, but the AOS has not yet accepted this. In addition, the islands hold most of the world population of vitelline warbler which otherwise occurs only on the Swan Islands of Honduras. There are 17 endemic subspecies belonging to 14 different species.

This list is presented in the taxonomic sequence of the Check-list of North and Middle American Birds, 7th edition through the 63rd Supplement, published by the American Ornithological Society (AOS). Common and scientific names are also those of the Check-list, except that the common names of families are from the Clements taxonomy because the AOS list does not include them.

The following tags have been used to highlight several categories of occurrence.

- (A) Accidental - a species that rarely or accidentally occurs in the Cayman Islands
- (E) Endemic - a species endemic to the Cayman Islands
- (I) Introduced - a species introduced by humans either directly to the Cayman Islands or elsewhere in the New World

== Ducks, geese, and waterfowl ==
Order: Anseriformes Family: Anatidae

Anatidae includes the ducks and most duck-like waterfowl, such as geese and swans. These birds are adapted to an aquatic existence with webbed feet, flattened bills, and feathers that are excellent at shedding water due to an oily coating.

- Black-bellied whistling-duck, Dendrocygna autumnalis (A)
- West Indian whistling-duck, Dendrocygna arborea
- Fulvous whistling-duck, Dendrocygna bicolor (A)
- Snow goose, Anser caerulescens (A)
- Canada goose, Branta canadensis (A)
- Wood duck, Aix sponsa (A)
- Blue-winged teal, Spatula discors
- Cinnamon teal, Spatula cyanoptera (A)
- Northern shoveler, Spatula clypeata (A)
- Gadwall, Mareca strepera (A)
- American wigeon, Mareca americana (A)
- Mallard, Anas platyrhynchos (A)
- White-cheeked pintail, Anas bahamensis (A)
- Northern pintail, Anas acuta (A)
- Green-winged teal, Anas crecca (A)
- Redhead, Aythya americana (A)
- Ring-necked duck, Aythya collaris (A)
- Lesser scaup, Aythya affinis
- Hooded merganser, Lophodytes cucullatus (A)
- Common merganser, Mergus merganser (A)
- Red-breasted merganser, Mergus serrator (A)
- Masked duck, Nomonyx dominicus (A)
- Ruddy duck, Oxyura jamaicensis (A)

== Flamingos ==
Order: Phoenicopteriformes Family: Phoenicopteridae

Flamingos are gregarious wading birds, usually 3 to 5 feet (0.9 to 1.5 m) tall, found in both the Western and Eastern Hemispheres. Flamingos filter-feed on shellfish and algae. Their oddly shaped beaks are specially adapted to separate mud and silt from the food they consume and, uniquely, are used upside-down.

- American flamingo, Phoenicopterus ruber (A)

== Grebes ==
Order: Podicipediformes Family: Podicipedidae

Grebes are small to medium-large freshwater diving birds. They have lobed toes and are excellent swimmers and divers. However, they have their feet placed far back on the body, making them quite ungainly on land.

- Least grebe, Tachybaptus dominicus (A)
- Pied-billed grebe, Podilymbus podiceps

== Pigeons and doves ==
Order: Columbiformes Family: Columbidae

Pigeons and doves are stout-bodied birds with short necks and short slender bills with a fleshy cere.

- Rock pigeon, Columba livia (I)
- White-crowned pigeon, Patagioenas leucocephala
- Eurasian collared-dove, Streptopelia decaocto (I)
- Common ground dove, Columbina passerina
- Caribbean dove, Leptotila jamaicensis
- White-winged dove, Zenaida asiatica
- Zenaida dove, Zenaida aurita
- Mourning dove, Zenaida macroura

== Cuckoos ==
Order: Cuculiformes Family: Cuculidae

The family Cuculidae includes cuckoos, roadrunners, and anis. These birds are of variable size with slender bodies, long tails, and strong legs.

- Smooth-billed ani, Crotophaga ani
- Yellow-billed cuckoo, Coccyzus americanus (A)
- Mangrove cuckoo, Coccyzus minor
- Black-billed cuckoo, Coccyzus erythropthalmus (A)

== Nightjars and allies ==
Order: Caprimulgiformes Family: Caprimulgidae

Nightjars are medium-sized nocturnal birds that usually nest on the ground. They have long wings, short legs, and very short bills. Most have small feet, of little use for walking, and long pointed wings. Their soft plumage is camouflaged to resemble bark or leaves.

- Common nighthawk, Chordeiles minor (A)
- Antillean nighthawk, Chordeiles gundlachii
- Chuck-will's-widow, Antrostomus carolinensis (A)

== Potoos ==
Order: Nyctibiiformes Family: Nyctibiidae

The potoos (sometimes called poor-me-ones) are large near passerine birds related to the nightjars and frogmouths. They are nocturnal insectivores which lack the bristles around the mouth found in the true nightjars.

- Northern potoo, Nyctibius jamaicensis (A)

== Swifts ==
Order: Apodiformes Family: Apodidae

Swifts are small birds which spend the majority of their lives flying. These birds have very short legs and never settle voluntarily on the ground, perching instead only on vertical surfaces. Many swifts have long swept-back wings which resemble a crescent or boomerang.

- Black swift, Cypseloides niger (A)
- Chimney swift, Chaetura pelagica (A)
- Antillean palm-swift, Tachornis phoenicobia (A)

== Hummingbirds ==
Order: Apodiformes Family: Trochilidae

Hummingbirds are small birds capable of hovering in mid-air due to the rapid flapping of their wings. They are the only birds that can fly backwards.

- Ruby-throated hummingbird, Archilochus colubris (A)

== Rails, gallinules, and coots ==
Order: Gruiformes Family: Rallidae

Rallidae is a large family of small to medium-sized birds which includes the rails, crakes, coots, and gallinules. Typically they inhabit dense vegetation in damp environments near lakes, swamps, or rivers. In general they are shy and secretive birds, making them difficult to observe. Most species have strong legs and long toes which are well adapted to soft uneven surfaces. They tend to have short, rounded wings and to be weak fliers.

- Sora, Porzana carolina
- Common gallinule, Gallinula galeata
- American coot, Fulica americana
- Purple gallinule, Porphyrio martinica
- Black rail, Laterallus jamaicensis (A)

== Limpkin ==
Order: Gruiformes Family: Aramidae

The limpkin is an odd bird that looks like a large rail, but is skeletally closer to the cranes. It is found in marshes with some trees or scrub in the Caribbean, South America, and southern Florida.

- Limpkin, Aramus guarauna (A)

== Stilts and avocets ==
Order: Charadriiformes Family: Recurvirostridae

Recurvirostridae is a family of large wading birds which includes the avocets and stilts. The avocets have long legs and long up-curved bills. The stilts have extremely long legs and long, thin, straight bills.

- Black-necked stilt, Himantopus mexicanus
- American avocet, Recurvirostra americana

== Plovers and lapwings ==
Order: Charadriiformes Family: Charadriidae

The family Charadriidae includes the plovers, dotterels, and lapwings. They are small to medium-sized birds with compact bodies, short thick necks, and long, usually pointed, wings. They are found in open country worldwide, mostly in habitats near water.

- Black-bellied plover, Pluvialis squatarola
- American golden-plover, Pluvialis dominica (A)
- Pacific golden-plover, Pluvialis fulva (A)
- Killdeer, Charadrius vociferus (A)
- Semipalmated plover, Charadrius semipalmatus
- Wilson's plover, Charadrius wilsonia (A)
- Snowy plover, Charadrius nivosus (A)

== Sandpipers and allies ==
Order: Charadriiformes Family: Scolopacidae

Scolopacidae is a large diverse family of small to medium-sized shorebirds including the sandpipers, curlews, godwits, shanks, tattlers, woodcocks, snipes, dowitchers, and phalaropes. The majority of these species eat small invertebrates picked out of the mud or soil. Variation in length of legs and bills enables multiple species to feed in the same habitat, particularly on the coast, without direct competition for food.

- Upland sandpiper, Bartramia longicauda (A)
- Whimbrel, Numenius phaeopus (A)
- Hudsonian godwit, Limosa haemastica (A)
- Marbled godwit, Limosa fedoa (A)
- Ruddy turnstone, Arenaria interpres
- Red knot, Calidris canutus (A)
- Ruff, Calidris pugnax (A)
- Stilt sandpiper, Calidris himantopus (A)
- Sanderling, Calidris alba (A)
- Dunlin, Calidris alpina (A)
- Baird's sandpiper, Calidris bairdii (A)
- Least sandpiper, Calidris minutilla
- White-rumped sandpiper, Calidris fuscicollis (A)
- Buff-breasted sandpiper, Calidris subruficollis (A)
- Pectoral sandpiper, Calidris melanotos (A)
- Semipalmated sandpiper, Calidris pusilla
- Western sandpiper, Calidris mauri (A)
- Short-billed dowitcher, Limnodromus griseus
- Long-billed dowitcher, Limnodromus scolopaceus (A)
- Wilson's snipe, Gallinago delicata (A)
- Spotted sandpiper, Actitis macularia
- Solitary sandpiper, Tringa solitaria
- Lesser yellowlegs, Tringa flavipes
- Willet, Tringa semipalmata
- Greater yellowlegs, Tringa melanoleuca
- Wilson's phalarope, Phalaropus tricolor (A)

== Skuas and jaegers ==
Order: Charadriiformes Family: Stercorariidae

The family Stercorariidae are, in general, medium to large birds, typically with grey or brown plumage, often with white markings on the wings. They nest on the ground in temperate and arctic regions and are long-distance migrants.

- Long-tailed jaeger, Stercorarius longicaudus (A)

== Gulls, terns, and skimmers ==
Order: Charadriiformes Family: Laridae

Laridae is a family of medium to large seabirds and includes gulls, kittiwakes, terns, and skimmers. They are typically grey or white, often with black markings on the head or wings. They have longish bills and webbed feet. Terns are a group of generally medium to large seabirds typically with grey or white plumage, often with black markings on the head. Most terns hunt fish by diving but some pick insects off the surface of fresh water. Terns are generally long-lived birds, with several species known to live in excess of 30 years. Skimmers are a small family of tropical tern-like birds. They have an elongated lower mandible which they use to feed by flying low over the water surface and skimming the water for small fish.

- Bonaparte's gull, Chroicocephalus philadelphia (A)
- Laughing gull, Leucophaeus atricilla
- Franklin's gull, Leucophaeus pipixcan (A)
- Ring-billed gull, Larus delawarensis (A)
- Herring gull, Larus argentatus (A)
- Lesser black-backed gull, Larus fuscus (A)
- Brown noddy, Anous stolidus (A)
- Sooty tern, Onychoprion fuscata (A)
- Bridled tern, Onychoprion anaethetus (A)
- Least tern, Sternula antillarum
- Gull-billed tern, Gelochelidon nilotica (A)
- Caspian tern, Hydroprogne caspia (A)
- Black tern, Chlidonias niger (A)
- Roseate tern, Sterna dougallii (A)
- Common tern, Sterna hirundo (A)
- Forster's tern, Sterna forsteri (A)
- Royal tern, Thalasseus maxima
- Sandwich tern, Thalasseus sandvicensis (A)
- Black skimmer, Rynchops niger (A)

== Tropicbirds ==
Order: Phaethontiformes Family: Phaethontidae

Tropicbirds are slender white birds of tropical oceans with exceptionally long central tail feathers. Their heads and long wings have black markings.

- White-tailed tropicbird, Phaethon lepturus

== Shearwaters and petrels ==
Order: Procellariiformes Family: Procellariidae

The procellariids are the main group of medium-sized "true petrels", characterised by united nostrils with medium septum and a long outer functional primary.

- Black-capped petrel, Pterodroma hasitata (A)
- Cory's shearwater, Calonectris diomedea (A)
- Great shearwater, Ardenna gravis (A)
- Sargasso shearwater, Puffinus lherminieri (A)

== Frigatebirds ==
Order: Suliformes Family: Fregatidae

Frigatebirds are large seabirds usually found over tropical oceans. They are large, black-and-white, or completely black, with long wings and deeply forked tails. The males have coloured inflatable throat pouches. They do not swim or walk and cannot take off from a flat surface. Having the largest wingspan-to-body-weight ratio of any bird, they are essentially aerial, able to stay aloft for more than a week.

- Magnificent frigatebird, Fregata magnificens

== Boobies and gannets ==
Order: Suliformes Family: Sulidae

The sulids comprise the gannets and boobies. Both groups are medium to large coastal seabirds that plunge-dive for fish.

- Masked booby, Sula dactylatra (A)
- Brown booby, Sula leucogaster
- Red-footed booby, Sula sula

== Anhingas ==
Order: Suliformes Family: Anhingidae

Anhingas are often called "snake-birds" because of their long thin neck, which gives a snake-like appearance when they swim with their bodies submerged. The males have black and dark-brown plumage, an erectile crest on the nape, and a larger bill than the female. The females have much paler plumage especially on the neck and underparts. The darters have completely webbed feet and their legs are short and set far back on the body. Their plumage is somewhat permeable, like that of cormorants, and they spread their wings to dry after diving.

- Anhinga, Anhinga anhinga (A)

== Cormorants and shags ==
Order: Suliformes Family: Phalacrocoracidae

Phalacrocoracidae is a family of medium to large coastal, fish-eating seabirds that includes cormorants and shags. Plumage colouration varies, with the majority having mainly dark plumage, some species being black-and-white, and a few being colourful.

- Double-crested cormorant, Nannopterum auritum (A)

== Pelicans ==
Order: Pelecaniformes Family: Pelecanidae

Pelicans are large water birds with a distinctive pouch under their beak. As with other members of the order Pelecaniformes, they have webbed feet with four toes.

- American white pelican, Pelecanus erythrorhynchos (A)
- Brown pelican, Pelecanus occidentalis

== Herons, egrets, and bitterns ==
Order: Pelecaniformes Family: Ardeidae

The family Ardeidae contains the bitterns, herons, and egrets. Herons and egrets are medium to large wading birds with long necks and legs. Bitterns tend to be shorter necked and more wary. Members of Ardeidae fly with their necks retracted, unlike other long-necked birds such as storks, ibises, and spoonbills.

- American bittern, Botaurus lentiginosus (A)
- Least bittern, Ixobrychus exilis
- Great blue heron, Ardea herodias
- Great egret, Ardea alba
- Snowy egret, Egretta thula
- Little blue heron, Egretta caerulea
- Tricolored heron, Egretta tricolor
- Reddish egret, Egretta rufescens (A)
- Cattle egret, Bubulcus ibis
- Green heron, Butorides virescens
- Black-crowned night-heron, Nycticorax nycticorax
- Yellow-crowned night-heron, Nyctanassa violacea

== Ibises and spoonbills ==
Order: Pelecaniformes Family: Threskiornithidae

Threskiornithidae is a family of large terrestrial and wading birds which includes the ibises and spoonbills. They have long, broad wings with 11 primary and about 20 secondary feathers. They are strong fliers and despite their size and weight, very capable soarers.

- White ibis, Eudocimus albus (A)
- Glossy ibis, Plegadis falcinellus (A)
- Roseate spoonbill, Platalea ajaja (A)

== New World vultures ==
Order: Cathartiformes Family: Cathartidae

The New World vultures are not closely related to Old World vultures, but superficially resemble them because of convergent evolution. Like the Old World vultures, they are scavengers. However, unlike Old World vultures, which find carcasses by sight, New World vultures have a good sense of smell with which they locate carrion.

- Black vulture, Coragyps atratus (A)
- Turkey vulture, Cathartes aura

== Osprey ==
Order: Accipitriformes Family: Pandionidae

The family Pandionidae contains only one species, the osprey. The osprey is a medium-large raptor which is a specialist fish-eater with a worldwide distribution.

- Osprey, Pandion haliaetus

== Hawks, eagles, and kites ==
Order: Accipitriformes Family: Accipitridae

Accipitridae is a family of birds of prey, which includes hawks, eagles, kites, harriers, and Old World vultures. These birds have powerful hooked beaks for tearing flesh from their prey, strong legs, powerful talons, and keen eyesight.

- Swallow-tailed kite, Elanoides forficatus (A)
- Northern harrier, Circus hudsonius (A)
- Mississippi kite, Ictinia mississippiensis (A)
- Common black hawk, Buteogallus anthracinus (A)
- Cuban black hawk, Buteogallus gundlachii (A)
- Red-tailed hawk, Buteo jamaicensis (A)

== Barn-owls ==
Order: Strigiformes Family: Tytonidae

Barn-owls are medium to large owls with large heads and characteristic heart-shaped faces. They have long strong legs with powerful talons.

- American barn owl, Tyto furcata

== Owls ==
Order: Strigiformes Family: Strigidae

The typical owls are small to large solitary nocturnal birds of prey. They have large forward-facing eyes and ears, a hawk-like beak, and a conspicuous circle of feathers around each eye called a facial disk.

- Short-eared owl, Asio flammeus (A)

== Kingfishers ==
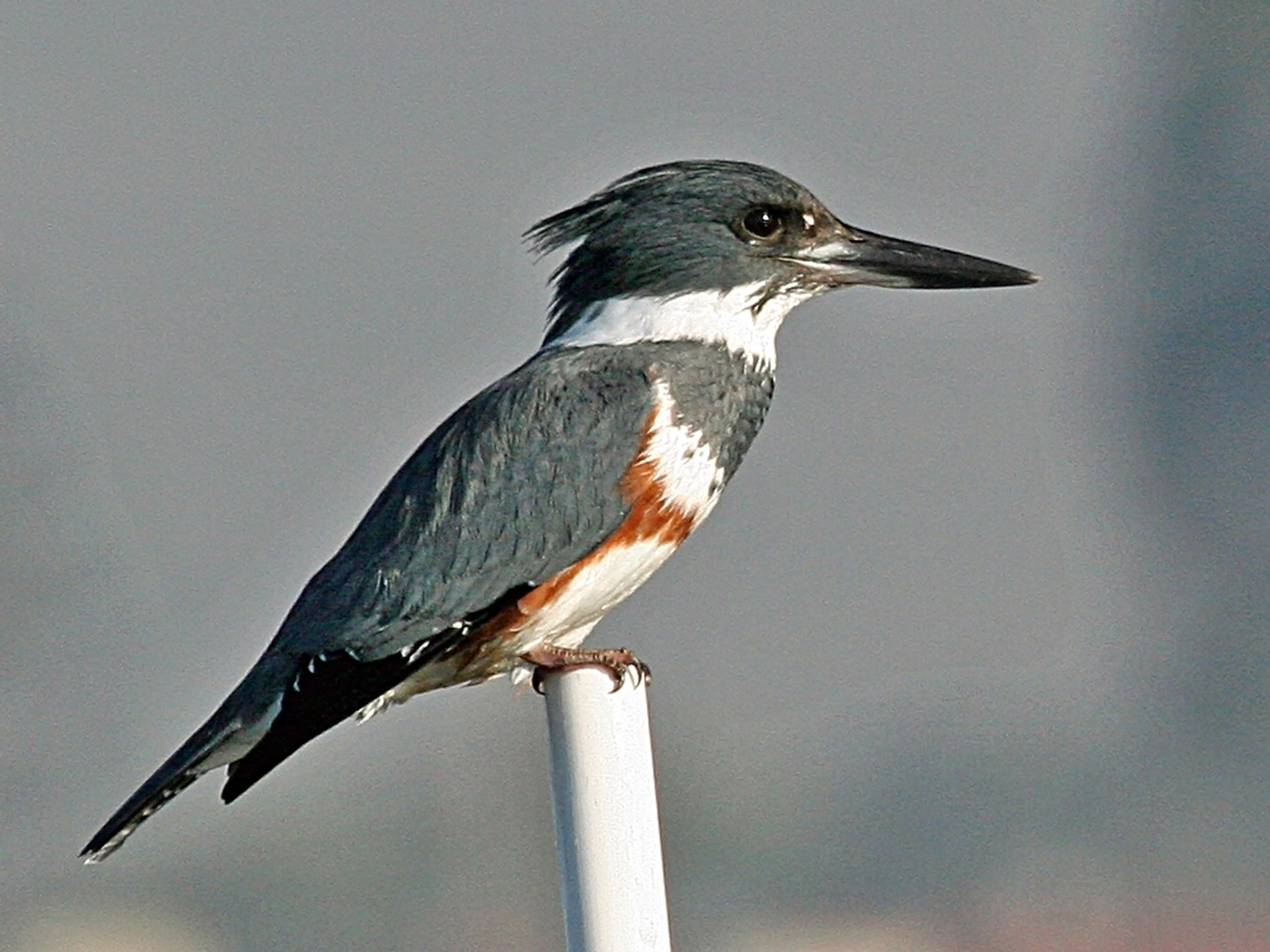
Belted kingfisher

Order: Coraciiformes Family: Alcedinidae

Kingfishers are medium-sized birds with large heads, long, pointed bills, short legs, and stubby tails.

- Belted kingfisher, Megaceryle alcyon

== Woodpeckers ==
Order: Piciformes Family: Picidae

Woodpeckers are small to medium-sized birds with chisel-like beaks, short legs, stiff tails, and long tongues used for capturing insects. Some species have feet with two toes pointing forward and two backward, while several species have only three toes. Many woodpeckers have the habit of tapping noisily on tree trunks with their beaks.

- West Indian woodpecker, Melanerpes superciliaris
- Yellow-bellied sapsucker, Sphyrapicus varius
- Northern flicker, Colaptes auratus

== Falcons and caracaras ==
Order: Falconiformes Family: Falconidae

Falconidae is a family of diurnal birds of prey. They differ from hawks, eagles, and kites in that they kill with their beaks instead of their talons.

- American kestrel, Falco sparverius
- Merlin, Falco columbarius
- Peregrine falcon, Falco peregrinus

== New World and African parrots ==
Order: Psittaciformes Family: Psittacidae

Parrots are small to large birds with a characteristic curved beak. Their upper mandibles have slight mobility in the joint with the skull and they have a generally erect stance. All parrots are zygodactyl, having the four toes on each foot placed two at the front and two to the back.

- Monk parakeet, Myiopsitta monachus (I)
- Cuban parrot, Amazona leucocephala

== Tyrant flycatchers ==
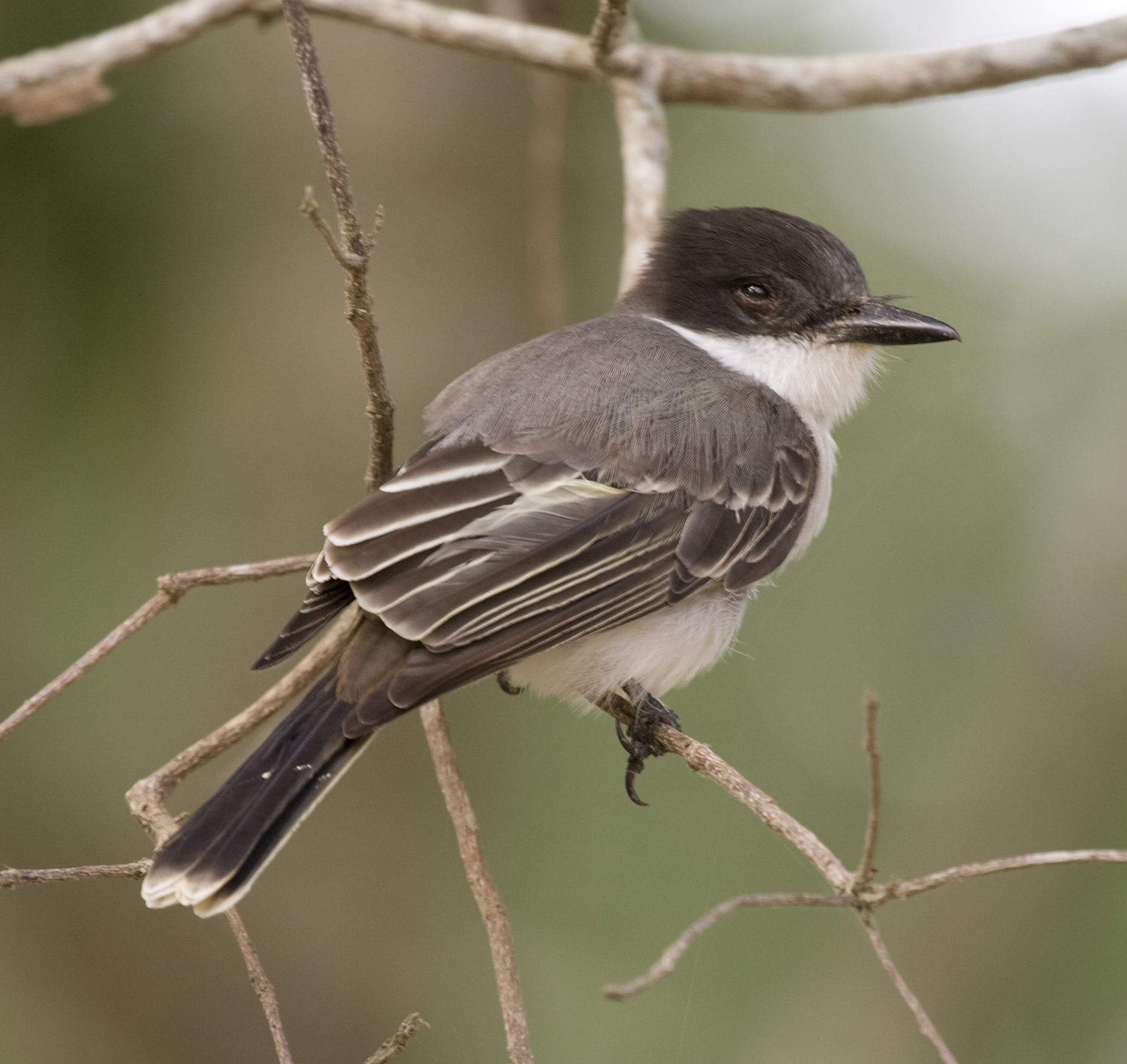
Loggerhead kingbird

Order: Passeriformes Family: Tyrannidae

Tyrant flycatchers are passerine birds which occur throughout North and South America. They superficially resemble the Old World flycatchers, but are more robust and have stronger bills. They do not have the sophisticated vocal capabilities of the songbirds. Most, but not all, have plain colouring. As the name implies, most are insectivorous.

- Caribbean elaenia, Elaenia martinica
- Eastern wood-pewee, Contopus virens (A)
- Great crested flycatcher, Myiarchus crinitus (A)
- La Sagra's flycatcher, Myiarchus sagrae
- Tropical kingbird, Tyrannus melancholicus (A)
- Eastern kingbird, Tyrannus tyrannus (A)
- Gray kingbird, Tyrannus dominicensis
- Loggerhead kingbird, Tyrannus caudifasciatus
- Fork-tailed flycatcher, Tyrannus savana (A)
- Scissor-tailed flycatcher, Tyrannus forficatus (A)
- Acadian flycatcher, Empidonax virescens (A)
- Alder flycatcher, Empidonax alnorum (A)
- Least flycatcher, Empidonax minimus (A)
- Yellow-bellied flycatcher, Empidonax flaviventris (A)
- Eastern phoebe, Sayornis phoebe (A)

== Vireos, shrike-babblers, and erpornis ==
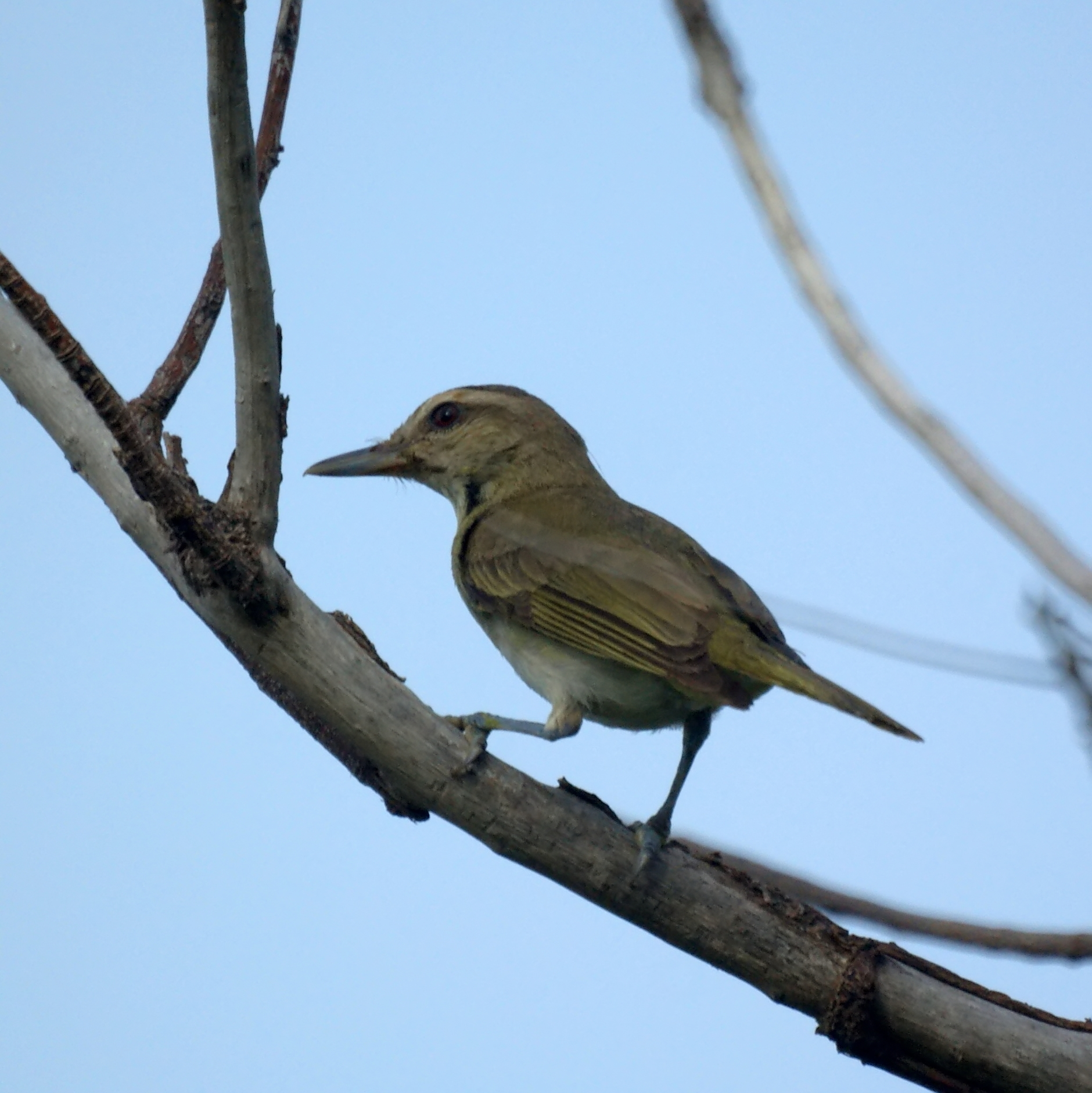
Black-whiskered vireo

Order: Passeriformes Family: Vireonidae

The vireos are a group of small to medium-sized passerine birds. They are typically greenish in colour and resemble New World warblers apart from their heavier bills.

- White-eyed vireo, Vireo griseus
- Thick-billed vireo, Vireo crassirostris
- Yellow-throated vireo, Vireo flavifrons (A)
- Blue-headed vireo, Vireo solitarius (A)
- Philadelphia vireo, Vireo philadelphicus (A)
- Red-eyed vireo, Vireo olivaceus
- Black-whiskered vireo, Vireo altiloquus
- Yucatan vireo, Vireo magister

== Swallows ==
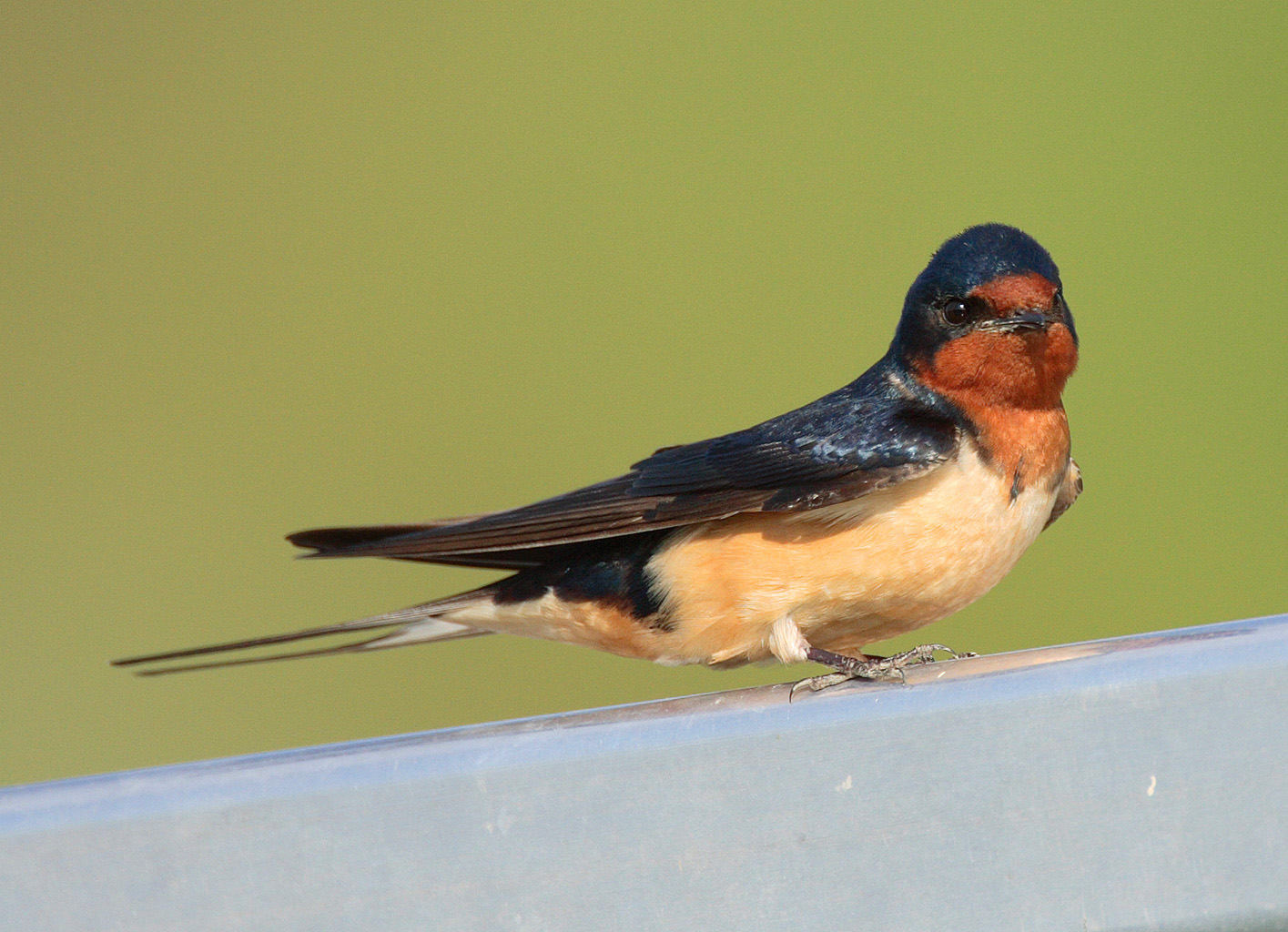
Barn swallow

Order: Passeriformes Family: Hirundinidae

The family Hirundinidae is adapted to aerial feeding. They have a slender streamlined body, long pointed wings, and a short bill with a wide gape. The feet are adapted to perching rather than walking, and the front toes are partially joined at the base.

- Bank swallow, Riparia riparia (A)
- Tree swallow, Tachycineta bicolor
- Northern rough-winged swallow, Stelgidopteryx serripennis (A)
- Purple martin, Progne subis
- Cuban martin, Progne cryptoleuca (A)
- Caribbean martin, Progne dominicensis (A)
- Barn swallow, Hirundo rustica
- Cliff swallow, Petrochelidon pyrrhonota (A)
- Cave swallow, Petrochelidon fulva (A)

== Kinglets ==
Order: Passeriformes Family: Regulidae

The kinglets and "crests" are a small family of birds which resemble some warblers. They are very small insectivorous birds in the single genus Regulus. The adults have coloured crowns, giving rise to their name.

- Ruby-crowned kinglet, Corthylio calendula (A)

== Waxwings ==
Order: Passeriformes Family: Bombycillidae

The waxwings are a group of birds with soft silky plumage and unique red tips to some of the wing feathers. In the Bohemian and cedar waxwings, these tips look like sealing wax and give the group its name. These are arboreal birds of northern forests. They live on insects in summer and berries in winter.

- Cedar waxwing, Bombycilla cedrorum (A)

== Gnatcatchers ==
Order: Passeriformes Family: Polioptilidae

These dainty birds resemble Old World warblers in their build and habits, moving restlessly through the foliage seeking insects. The gnatcatchers and gnatwrens are mainly soft bluish grey in colour and have the typical insectivore's long sharp bill. They are birds of fairly open woodland or scrub, which nest in bushes or trees.

- Blue-gray gnatcatcher, Polioptila caerulea (A)

== Mockingbirds and allies ==
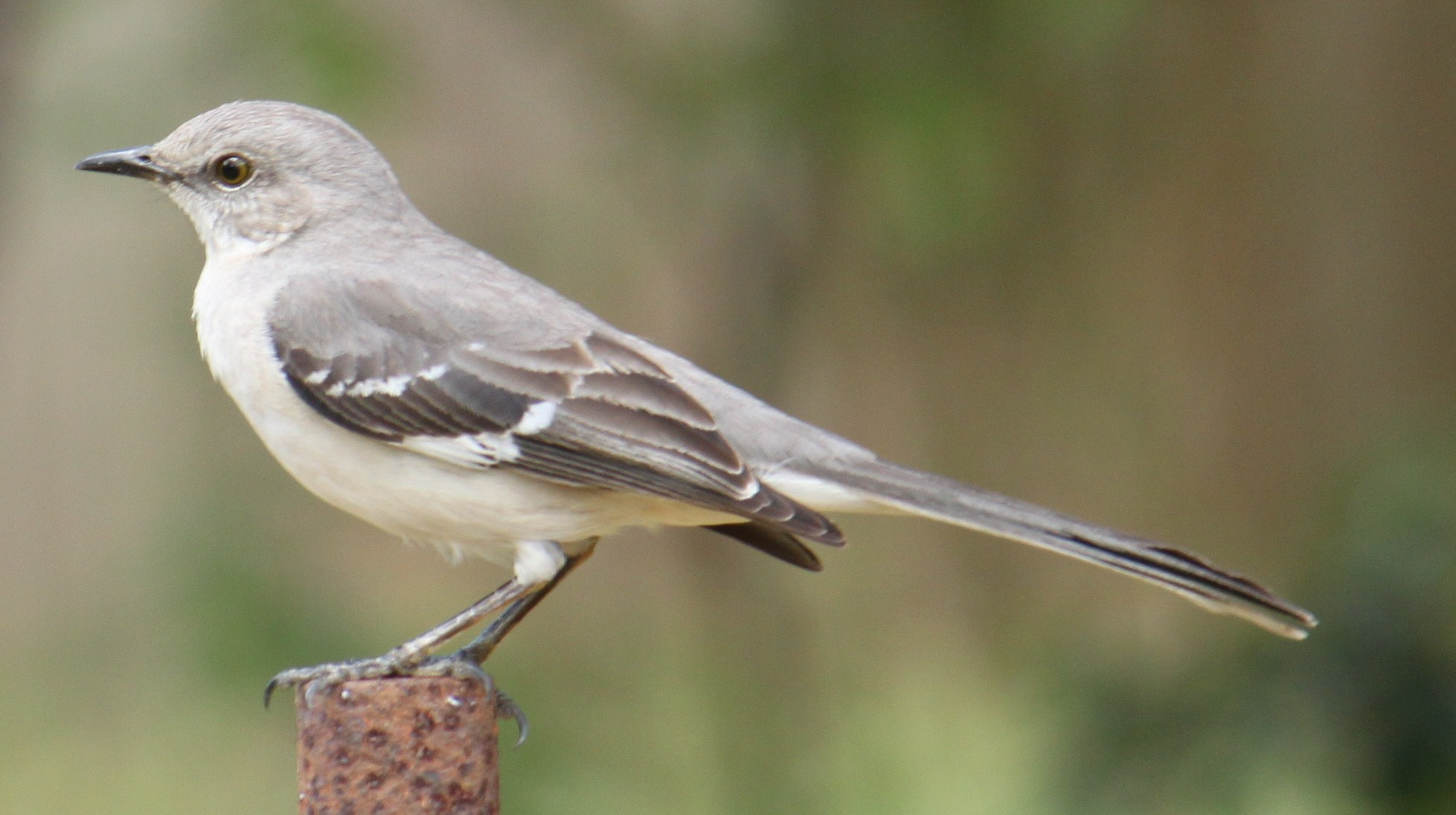
Northern mockingbird

Order: Passeriformes Family: Mimidae

The mimids are a family of passerine birds that includes thrashers, mockingbirds, tremblers, and the New World catbirds. These birds are notable for their vocalizations, especially their ability to mimic a wide variety of birds and other sounds heard outdoors. Their colouring tends towards dull-greys and browns.

- Gray catbird, Dumetella carolinensis
- Northern mockingbird, Mimus polyglottos

== Starlings ==
Order: Passeriformes Family: Sturnidae

Starlings are small to medium-sized passerine birds. Their flight is strong and direct and they are very gregarious. Their preferred habitat is fairly open country. They eat insects and fruit. Plumage is typically dark with a metallic sheen.

- European starling, Sturnus vulgaris (I) (A)

== Thrushes and allies ==
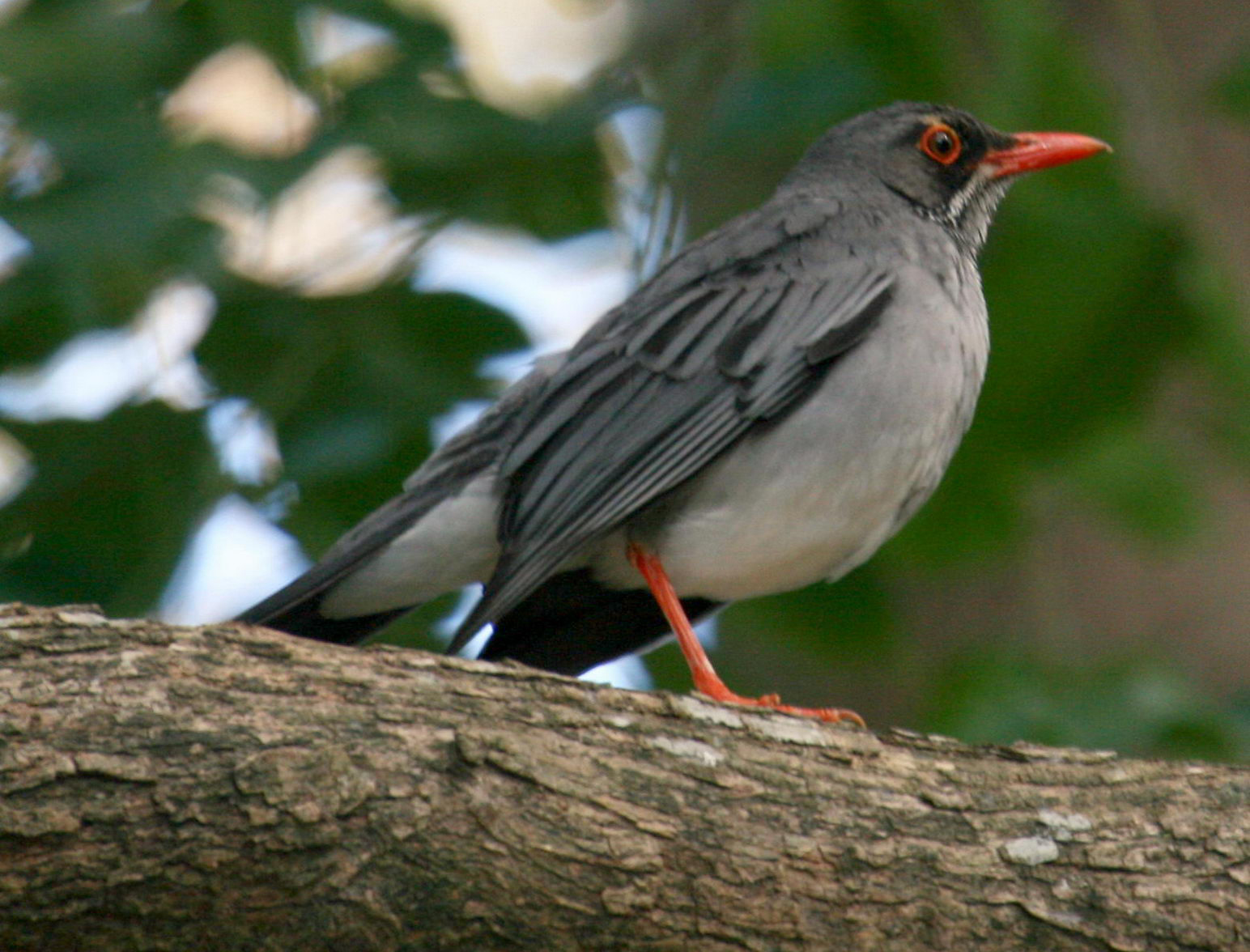
Western red-legged thrush

Order: Passeriformes Family: Turdidae

The thrushes are a group of passerine birds that occur mainly in the Old World. They are plump, soft plumaged, small to medium-sized insectivores or sometimes omnivores, often feeding on the ground. Many have attractive songs.

- Veery, Catharus fuscescens (A)
- Gray-cheeked thrush, Catharus minimus (A)
- Swainson's thrush, Catharus ustulatus (A)
- Wood thrush, Hylocichla mustelina (A)
- Grand Cayman thrush, Turdus ravidus (E) (Extinct)
- Western red-legged thrush, Turdus plumbeus

== Waxbills and allies ==
Order: Passeriformes Family: Estrildidae

The estrildid finches are small passerine birds native to the Old World tropics. They are gregarious and often colonial seed eaters with short thick but pointed bills. They are all similar in structure and habits, but have wide variation in plumage colours and patterns.

- Scaly-breasted munia, Lonchura punctulata (I) (A)
- Tricolored munia, Lonchura malacca (I) (A)

== Old World sparrows ==
Order: Passeriformes Family: Emberizidae

Old World sparrows are small passerine birds. In general, sparrows tend to be small plump brownish or greyish birds with short tails and short powerful beaks. Sparrows are seed eaters, but they also consume small insects.

- House sparrow, Passer domesticus (I)

== New World sparrows ==
Order: Passeriformes Family: Passerellidae

Until 2017, these species were considered part of the family Emberizidae. Most of the species are known as sparrows, but these birds are not closely related to the Old World sparrows which are in the family Passeridae. Many of these have distinctive head patterns.

- Grasshopper sparrow, Ammodramus savannarum (A)
- Chipping sparrow, Spizella passerina (A)
- Clay-colored sparrow, Spizella pallida (A)
- Dark-eyed junco, Junco hyemalis (A)
- White-crowned sparrow, Zonotrichia leucophrys (A)
- Vesper sparrow, Pooecetes gramineus (A)
- Savannah sparrow, Passerculus sandwichensis (A)
- Lark sparrow, Chondestes grammacus (A)

== Spindalises ==
Order: Passeriformes Family: Spindalidae

The members of this small family are native to the Greater Antilles. They were formerly classified as tanagers (family Thraupidae) but were placed in their own family in 2017.

- Western spindalis, Spindalis zena

== Yellow-breasted chat ==
Order: Passeriformes Family: Icteriidae

This species was historically placed in the New World warblers (Parulidae) but nonetheless most authorities were unsure if it belonged there. It was placed in its own family in 2017.

- Yellow-breasted chat, Icteria virens (A)

== Troupials and allies ==
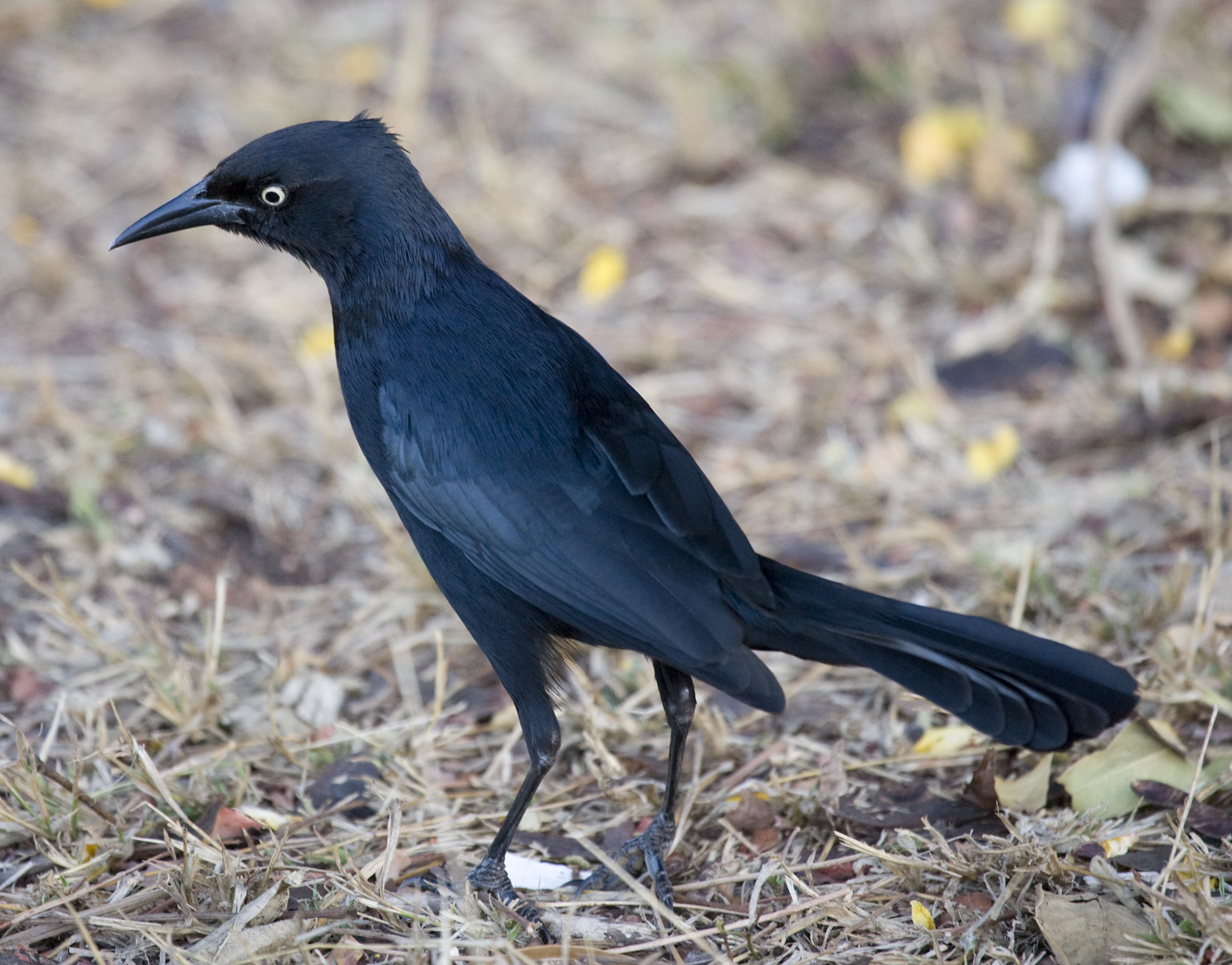
Greater Antillean grackle

Order: Passeriformes Family: Icteridae

The icterids are a group of small to medium-sized, often colourful, passerine birds restricted to the New World and include the grackles, New World blackbirds, and New World orioles. Most species have black as the predominant plumage colour, often enlivened by yellow, orange, or red.

- Yellow-headed blackbird, Xanthocephalus xanthocephalus (A)
- Bobolink, Dolichonyx oryzivorus (A)
- Orchard oriole, Icterus spurius (A)
- Jamaican oriole, Icterus leucopteryx (Extirpated)
- Baltimore oriole, Icterus galbula (A)
- Tawny-shouldered blackbird, Agelaius humeralis (A)
- Shiny cowbird, Molothrus bonariensis (A)
- Greater Antillean grackle, Quiscalus niger

== New World warblers ==
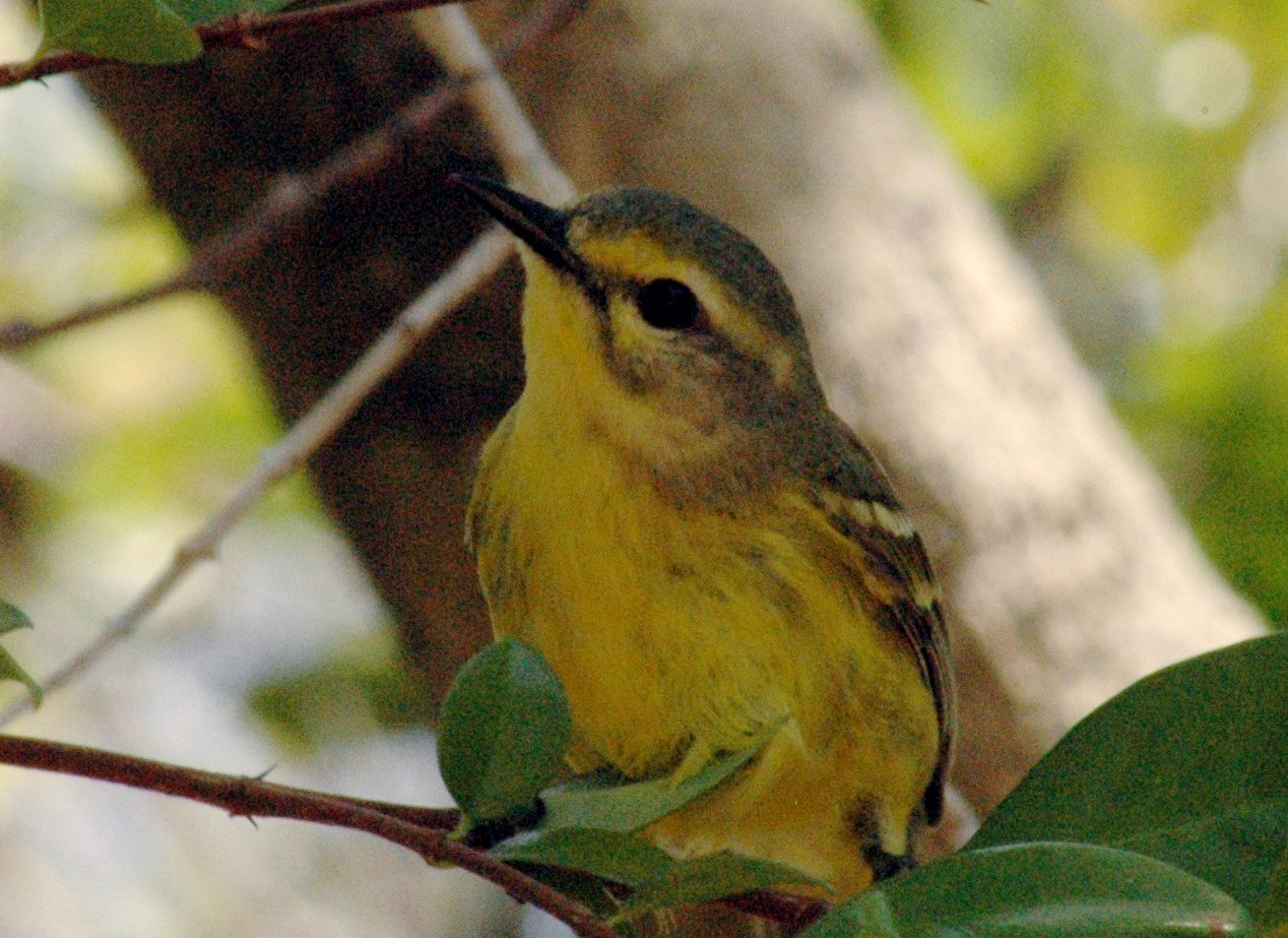
Vitelline warbler

Order: Passeriformes Family: Parulidae

The New World warblers are a group of small, often colourful, passerine birds restricted to the New World. Most are arboreal, but some are terrestrial. Most members of this family are insectivores.

- Ovenbird, Seiurus aurocapilla
- Worm-eating warbler, Helmitheros vermivorum
- Louisiana waterthrush, Parkesia motacilla (A)
- Northern waterthrush, Parkesia noveboracensis
- Golden-winged warbler, Vermivora chrysoptera (A)
- Blue-winged warbler, Vermivora cyanoptera (A)
- Black-and-white warbler, Mniotilta varia
- Prothonotary warbler, Protonotaria citrea (A)
- Swainson's warbler, Limnothlypis swainsonii (A)
- Tennessee warbler, Leiothlypis peregrina (A)
- Orange-crowned warbler, Leiothlypis celata (A)
- Nashville warbler, Leiothlypis ruficapilla (A)
- Connecticut warbler, Oporornis agilis (A)
- Mourning warbler, Geothlypis philadelphia (A)
- Kentucky warbler, Geothlypis formosa (A)
- Common yellowthroat, Geothlypis trichas
- Hooded warbler, Setophaga citrina (A)
- American redstart, Setophaga ruticilla
- Cape May warbler, Setophaga tigrina
- Cerulean warbler, Setophaga cerulea (A)
- Northern parula, Setophaga americana
- Magnolia warbler, Setophaga magnolia
- Bay-breasted warbler, Setophaga castanea (A)
- Blackburnian warbler, Setophaga fusca (A)
- Yellow warbler, Setophaga petechia
- Chestnut-sided warbler, Setophaga pensylvanica (A)
- Blackpoll warbler, Setophaga striata (A)
- Black-throated blue warbler, Setophaga caerulescens
- Palm warbler, Setophaga palmarum
- Pine warbler, Setophaga pinus (A)
- Yellow-rumped warbler, Setophaga coronata
- Yellow-throated warbler, Setophaga dominica
- Vitelline warbler, Setophaga vitellina (near-endemic)
- Prairie warbler, Setophaga discolor
- Townsend's warbler, Setophaga townsendi (A)
- Black-throated green warbler, Setophaga virens (A)
- Canada warbler, Cardellina canadensis (A)
- Wilson's warbler, Cardellina pusilla (A)

== Cardinals and allies ==
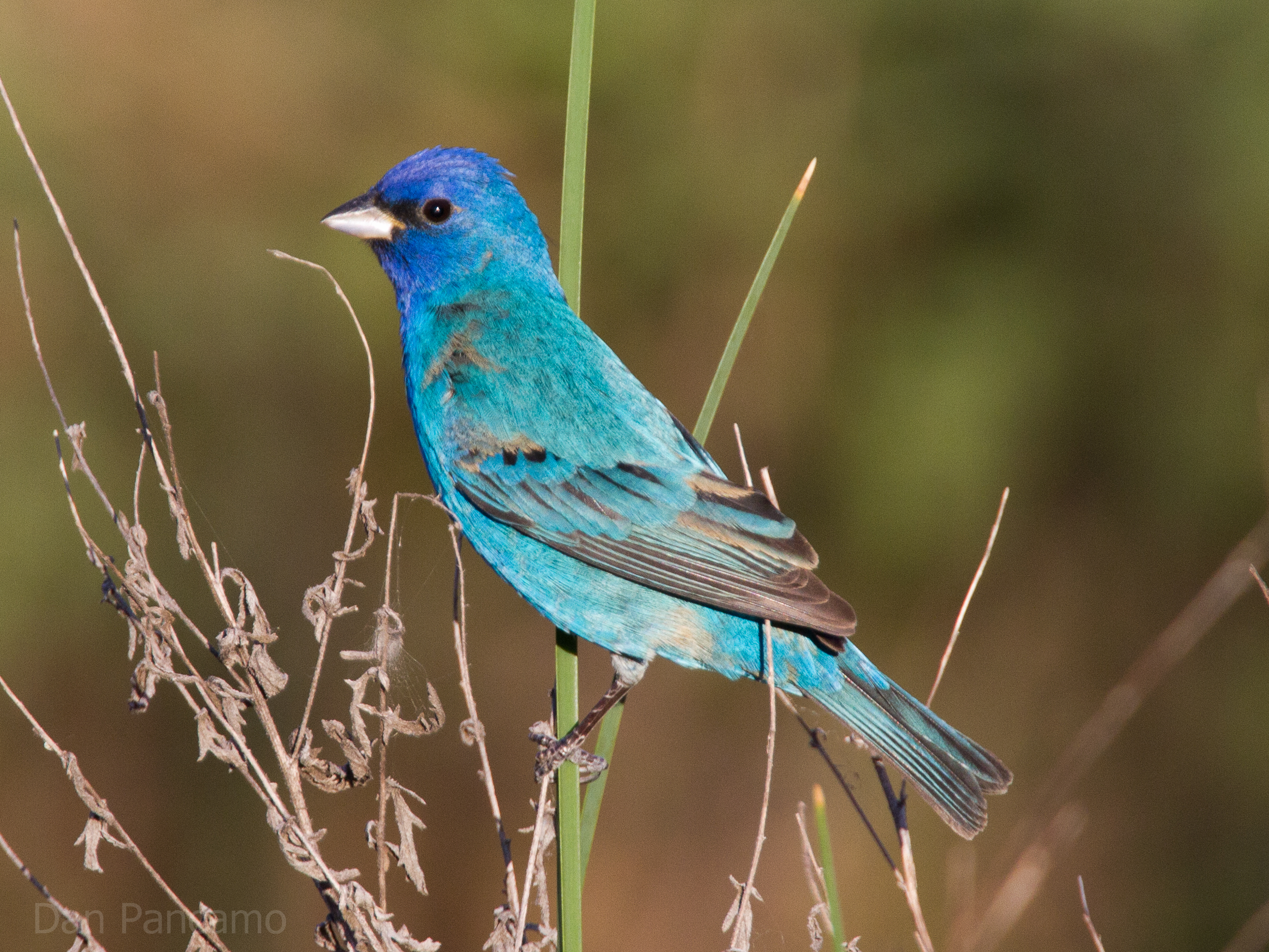
Indigo bunting

Order: Passeriformes Family: Cardinalidae

The cardinals are a family of robust, seed-eating birds with strong bills. They are typically associated with open woodland. The sexes usually have distinct plumages.

- Summer tanager, Piranga rubra
- Scarlet tanager, Piranga olivacea (A)
- Rose-breasted grosbeak, Pheucticus ludovicianus
- Blue grosbeak, Passerina caerulea (A)
- Indigo bunting, Passerina cyanea
- Painted bunting, Passerina ciris (A)
- Dickcissel, Spiza americana (A)

== Tanagers and allies ==
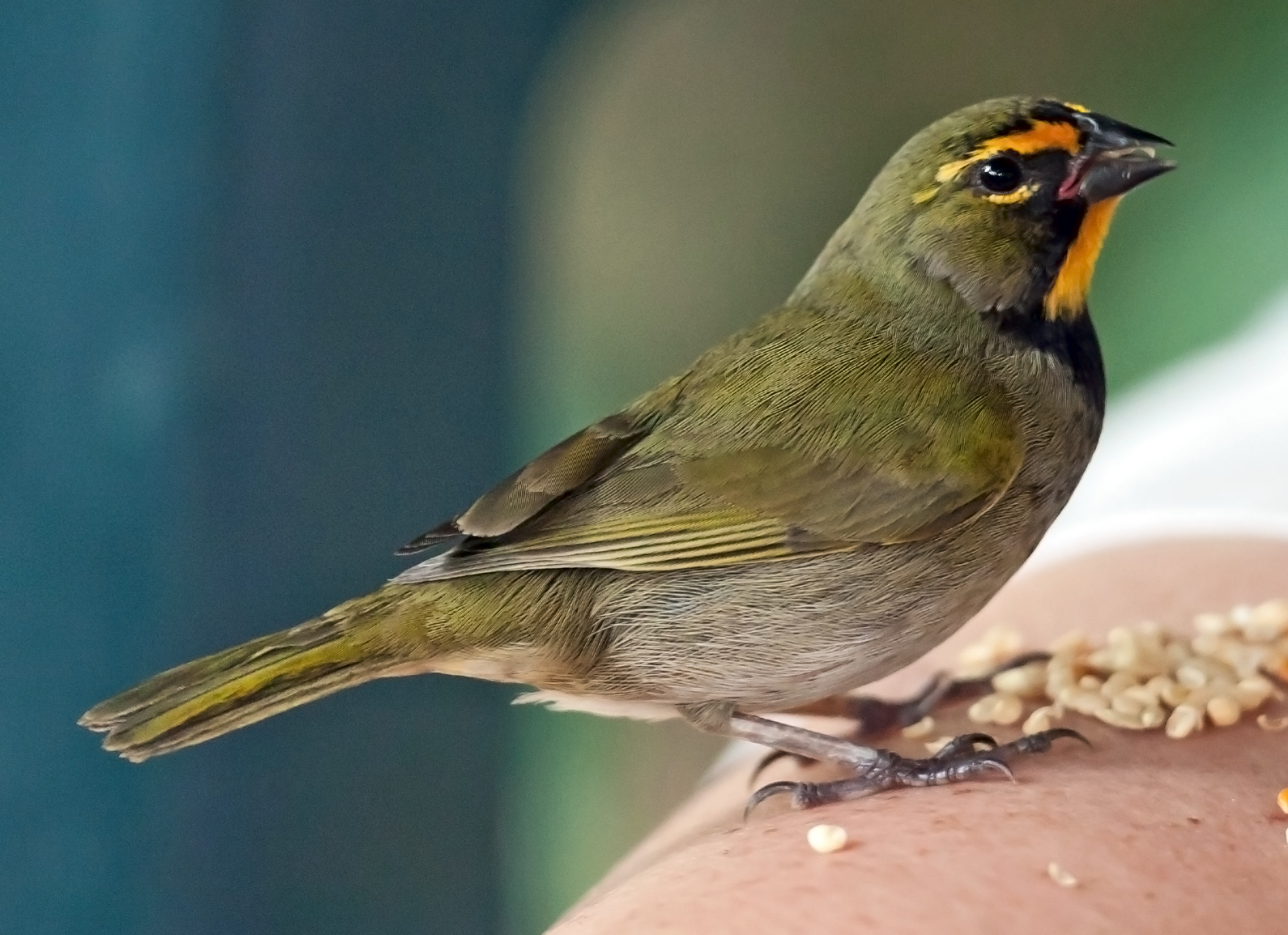
Yellow-faced grassquit

Order: Passeriformes Family: Thraupidae

The tanagers are a large group of small to medium-sized passerine birds restricted to the New World, mainly in the tropics. Many species are brightly coloured. As a family they are omnivorous, but individual species specialize in eating fruits, seeds, insects, or other types of food. Most have short, rounded wings.

- Bananaquit, Coereba flaveola
- Yellow-faced grassquit, Tiaris olivaceus
- Grand Cayman bullfinch, Melopyrrha taylori (E)

== See also ==
- List of birds
- Lists of birds by region
