= Education in the Cayman Islands =

Education in the Cayman Islands is compulsory for those aged 4 to 16 and is free to all Caymanian children. The literacy rate for residents over age 15 is 98%. Public schools follow a British-style educational system. The Cayman Islands Education Department operates 10 primary, one special education, and three high schools. In addition, there is a university and a school of law. There are also numerous private schools.

== Further education ==
- Cayman Islands Further Education Centre

== Universities ==
=== Public Universities ===
- University College of the Cayman Islands
- Truman Bodden Law School (affiliated with the University of Liverpool)

=== Private Universities ===
- International College of the Cayman Islands
- St Matthew's University

== Research Institutions ==
- Central Caribbean Marine Institute
