= Politics of the Cayman Islands =

The politics of the Cayman Islands takes place within a framework of parliamentary democracy, within the confines of the Government of the Cayman Islands.

== Constitutional Modernisation ==
Constitutional Modernisation has come to the forefront of politics recently with the collapse of the now defunct Euro Bank Corporation in 2003. The prosecution in the trial was forced to reveal that the British Government had planted moles (and used wire taps) throughout the banking industry using MI6, with the consent of the Governor. This caused the trial's collapse, and subsequent release of those charged with wrongdoing. Along with this, the only mole that was known at the time was allowed to leave the country, never to answer for what he (or the United Kingdom) was doing. This infuriated the elected members of the Legislative Assembly as they maintained that the Governor and the United Kingdom had put into question the Cayman Islands' reputation as a tightly regulated offshore jurisdiction. Some saw this as the United Kingdom meddling in the territory's affairs to benefit itself (and the EU), at the expense of the islands' economy.

Constitutional talks however went on hold following Hurricane Ivan in 2004. Subsequently, in May 2005 the ruling UDP was ousted by the PPM, which restarted the process of constitutional modernisation. The new constitution took effect on 6 November 2009.

== See also ==
- Elections in the Cayman Islands
