= Hinduism in the West Indies =

Hinduism is the leading single religion of the Indo-Caribbean communities of the West Indies. Hindus are particularly well represented in Guyana, Suriname, Guadeloupe and Trinidad and Tobago. The Cayman Islands also hosts a sizable Hindu population, with 2.4 percent of the country affiliating with the religion. Smaller groups of Indo-Caribbeans live elsewhere in the Caribbean, especially Puerto Rico, Jamaica, Belize, Martinique, Barbados, Saint Vincent and the Grenadines, Saint Lucia, and Bahamas.

== Hinduism by territories ==
=== Anguilla ===
The total Hindu population of Anguilla is 58 as of the 2011 Census. This represents 0.42% of the population and is an increase of 13 from the previous count of 45 (0.39%, taken from the 2001 Census). Hinduism is also the 7th fastest growing religion by percent (28.9%) and the 9th fastest by absolute change (13). Hindus also contributed 0.61% of the total population gain.

Year	Percent	Population
2001	0.39%	45
2010	0.42%	58

=== Antigua and Barbuda ===
The percentage of Hindus in Antigua and Barbuda as of the 2011 Census is 0.4%, or 379 adherents. This represented growth of more than 40% from the 2001 Census, which showed that there were 157 active followers. This growth made the number of Hindus surpass Presbyterians (170 to 142), Salvation Army (369 to 365) and Islam (189 to 208). The population is mainly made up of Indian immigrants, who alone make up over 1.1% of the total population. Most Hindus are from the category of Indian/East Indian, which makes up less than 5%.

Year	Percent	Population
2011	0.4%	379
2015	0.51%	477

=== Bahamas ===
According to the 2010 Census, there were a total of 428 Hindus living in the Bahamas, making up 0.12% of the total population. The 2010 census showed that slightly more than half of Hindus (around 220 people) in the Bahamas are younger than age 34.

=== Barbados ===
Today, Barbados has 2,000 Indians living in the country. They came as recently immigrants from Guyana. Because of the huge Indian population, Hinduism became one of the growing religions of Barbados. The 2000 Census showed the number of Hindus in Barbados to be at 840, which accounted for 0.34% of the total population. The 2010 Census showed that the number of Hindus rose by 215 people (or 25%) to be at 1,055. This increased Hinduism's share of the total Barbados population from 0.34% in 2000 to 0.46% in 2010.

=== Bermuda ===
Most of the Hindus in Bermuda are of South Indian/Tamil descent. The population of Hindu's in Bermuda is 0.2%.

=== Cayman Islands ===
Year	Percent	Population
2000	0.25%	98
2008	1%	510
2011	0.8%	454
2021	1.7%	1,191

Hinduism is the fastest growing religion in the Cayman Islands, with the population skyrocketing in recent years. Previously, there were only 98 Hindus in the Caymans according to the 2000 census (about 0.25% of the population). In the 2008 census, the number of Hindus increased to 510 (1% of the total population). The 2010 Census showed the number of Hindus decreasing to 454 (0.8% of the total Cayman Islands population). In 2021, the Hindu population increased to 1,191 (1.7% of the population). Most of them reside in the capital George Town. The highest proportion of Hindus is in the districts of East End (6.6%) and North Side (3.8%).

=== Cuba ===
Hindus who live in Cuba accounted for 0.2% of the population in 2010.

=== Dominica ===
A non-negligible amount of Hindus live in Dominica, accounting for under 0.1% of the population.

=== Grenada ===
According to the 2011 census there are 210 Hindus in Grenada forming 0.2% of the country's population.

According to ARDA, there were 866 Hindus in Grenada accounting 0.7% of the total population in 2020.

=== Guadeloupe ===
Hinduism is a minority religion in Guadeloupe, followed by a small fraction of Indo-Guadeloupeans. According to a statistics data, Hinduism is practised by 0.5% of the people in Guadeloupe.

=== Martinique ===
Hinduism is followed in the Martinique by a small fraction of Indo-Martiniquais. As of 2007, Hinduism constitute 0.3% of the population of Martinique.

=== Jamaica ===
Jamaica was once home to 25,000 Hindus until the mid-20th century. However, most of them were converted to Christianity and assimilated into Afro population. In the last few decades, the population of Hindus in Jamaica decreased steeply. In the 1970s, 5,000 identified themselves as Hindus. With there population further declining to 1,453, according to the 2001 census. Since then, the Hindu population of Jamaica has risen, and it has become the second largest religion (after Christianity) in Jamaica. Diwali (pronounced Divali), the festival of lights, is celebrated in Jamaica every year. The 2011 Census showed that the number of Hindus in Jamaica increased by 383 people to be at 1,836 adherents. Hinduism's share of the total Jamaican population increased from 0.06% in 2001 to 0.07% of the population in 2011.

=== Montserrat ===
According to the 2023 census, there are 48 Hindus in Montserrat constituting 1.1% of its population, which is slightly higher than the 31 Hindus counted in 2001 census, which constituted 0.8% of the total population and forming the 4th largest religious entity. Hindu males numbered 20 and made up 1.0% of the total number of males in the 2001 Census, with 11 Hindu females making up 0.6% of the female total.

=== Puerto Rico ===
As of 2020, there were 2,957 Hindus in Puerto Rico making 0.09% of the population according to ARDA.

=== Saint Kitts and Nevis ===
Hindus made up 1.82% of the total population of Saint Kitts and Nevis according to the 2010 census up from 0.8% in 2001. There are 860 Hindus in Saint Kittie and Nevis. Hinduism is currently the second largest religion in St. Kitts-Nevis after Christianity.

=== Saint Lucia ===
Most of the Indian community in Saint Lucia have converted to Christianity. Only 325 people were reported as Hindus in the 2001 census (0.2% of the total population census). The 2010 Census showed the percentage total of Hindus had increased to 0.3%.

=== Saint Vincent and the Grenadines ===
The 2000 census reported 83 Hindus in Saint Vincent and the Grenadines making up 0.08% of the total population. The 2023 Census reported 45 Hindus forming 0.1 % of the population.

=== Trinidad and Tobago ===
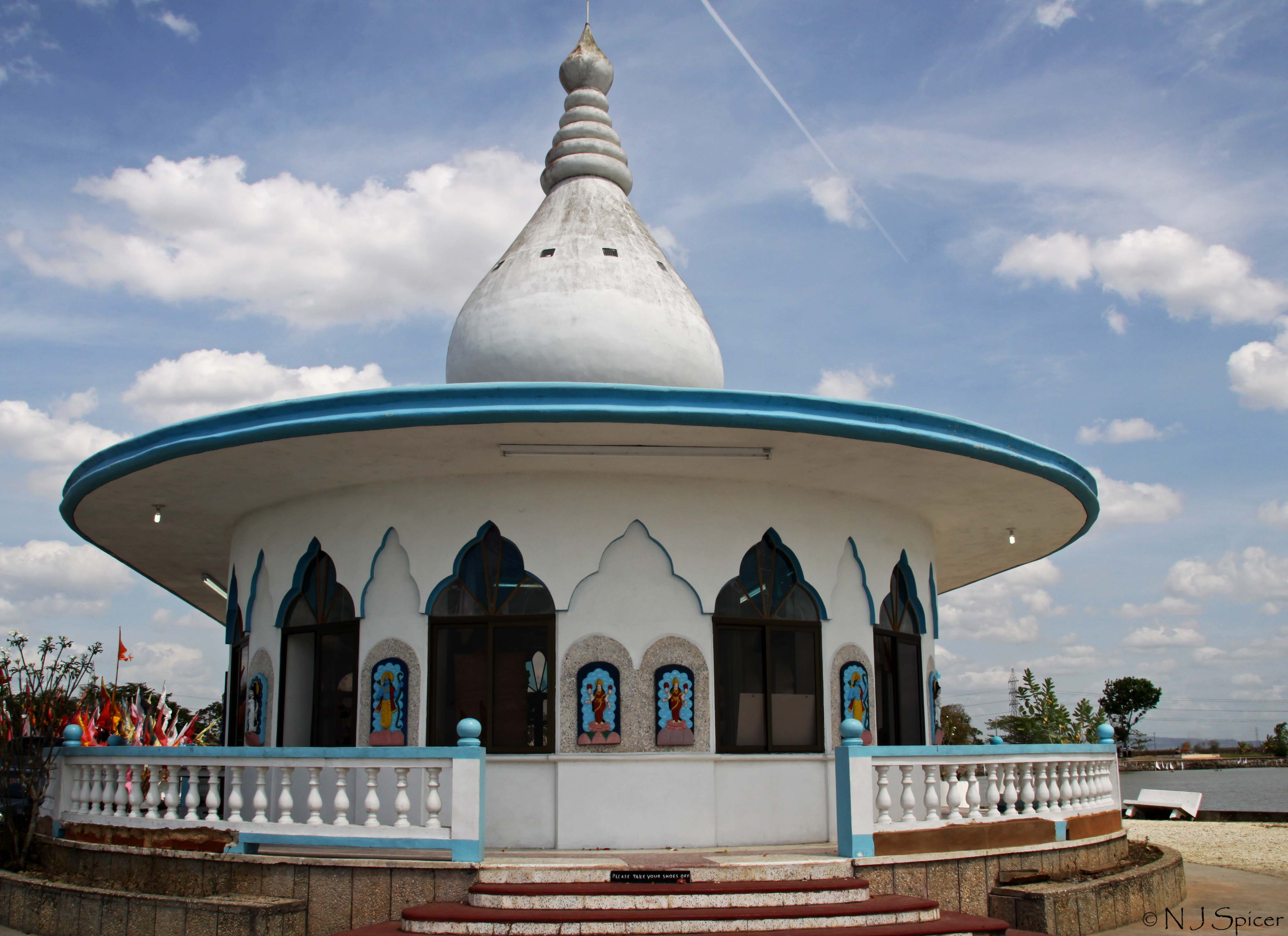
Temple in the Sea

Hinduism is a significant minority religion in Trinidad and Tobago, accounting for over 22% of the country’s religious population according to the 2011 census. It is the second-largest religion in the country and the largest religion among Indo-Trinidadians, with 49.5% of the Indo-Trinidadian population identifying as Hindu. Hinduism has been present in Trinidad and Tobago for more than 170 years, dating back to the arrival of Indian indentured labourers in the mid-19th century.

=== Turks and Caicos Islands ===
The Indian population in the Turks and Caicos Islands is mostly of Sindhi origin. The community mostly is employed in retail jewellery and electronics business, in addition to some doctors, nurses, teachers, chartered accountants and other sectors. Many Indians are self-employed, and some are employed in the local hospitality industry.

=== United States Virgin Islands ===
According to the 2011 census there were more than 528 Hindus in the United States Virgin Islands (1.9% of the population). Most of them were recent immigrants from India, and most of them reside on St. Thomas.

=== British Virgin Islands ===
According to the 1991 census, Hindus constituted 2.16% of the population of British Virgin Islands, which then decreased to 1.95% in the 2001 census. It further decreased to 1.88% in 2011 census.

== Hindu populations according to the latest Census ==
Country / Territory	Hindu population	Percentage of population	Census year	References
Guyana	213,282	31.0%	2020	
Suriname	120,623	23.1%	2015	
Trinidad and Tobago	240,100	24.33%	2020 (est.)	
Puerto Rico	3,865	0.13%	2020	
Jamaica	1,836	0.07%	2011	
Barbados	1,055	0.38%	2010	
Saint Lucia	500	0.3%	2010	
Bahamas	428	0.12%	2010	
United States Virgin Islands	400	1.9%	2011	
Antigua and Barbuda	379	0.4%	2011	
Saint Kitts and Nevis	860	1.82%	2011	
Grenada	210	0.20%	2011	
Saint Vincent and the Grenadines	45	0.1%	2023	
Anguilla	58	0.42%	2011	
Montserrat	48	1.1%	2023	
Cayman Islands	1,191	1.7%	2021	

== See also ==
- Indo-Caribbean
  - Indo-Trinidadian
- Hinduism in Trinidad and Tobago
- Hinduism in South America
- Hinduism in the United States
- Hinduism in Canada
- Caribbean Shaktism
