= Shooting at the 2011 Island Games =

Shooting at the 2011 Island Games was held from 28 June to 1 July 2011 at Sainham, Godshill.

== Events ==
=== Medal table ===
Rank	Nation	Gold	Silver	Bronze	Total
1	Isle of Man	8	3	5	16
2	Gotland	6	6	7	19
3	Åland	5	3	4	12
4	Isle of Wight	5	2	6	13
5	Jersey	4	10	4	18
6	Gibraltar	3	2	4	9
7	Menorca	2	3	2	7
8	Guernsey	1	3	1	5
9	Sark	1	1	1	3
10	Cayman Islands	1	0	0	1
11	Orkney	0	2	1	3
12	Saare County	0	1	0	1
13	Faroe Islands	0	0	1	1
13	Hitra Municipality	0	0	1	1
Totals (14 entries)		36	36	37	109

=== Men ===
Event	Gold		Silver		Bronze	
Skeet Individual	Edison Mclean (CAY)	130	David Clague (IOM)	128	Lennart Åkerblom (ALA)	123
Skeet Team	Isle of Man; David Clague; Daniel Shacklock	166	Åland; Lennart Åkerblom; Bengt-Olof Lindgren	164	Guernsey; Noel Duquemin; Vincent Helmot	160
ABT Individual	Juan Manuel Bagur Bosch (Menorca)	138	Adolfo Vilafranca (Menorca)	135	Stefan Roberts (Sark)	126
ABT Team	Sark; Nicholas Dewe; Stefan Roberts	176	Menorca; Juan Manuel Bagur Bosch; Sebastian Bosch	173	Isle of Man; Glenn Catlin; Peter Kelly	163
UT Individual	Juan Manuel Bagur Bosch (Menorca)	143	Stefan Roberts (Sark)	135	Darren Burtenshaw (GGY)	135
UT Team	Isle of Man; Neil Parsons; Philip Ward	187	Menorca; Juan Manuel Bagur Bosch; Sebastian Bosch	182	Gibraltar; Gary Cooper; Harry Murphy	177
Sporting Individual	Dan Bishop (Isle of Wight)	83	Argo Saagpakk (Saaremaa)	80	Jake Keeling (Isle of Man); Lee Pitman (Isle of Wight)	77
Sporting Team	Isle of Wight; Dan Bishop; Mark Downer; Lee Pitman	167	Isle of Man; Jake Keeling; Martin Kneen; Kevin Oates	166	Orkney; Alan J Clouston; Derek Firth; Victor Smith	156
10m Air Pistol	Tomas Mörn (ALA)	649.7	Pontus Nordgren (Gotland)	649.2	Michael Quenault (Jersey)	649
10m Air Pistol Team	Gotland; Peter Nordgren; Pontus Nordgren	1118	Jersey; Michael Quenault; David Ward	1101	Åland; Fredrik Blomqvist; Tomas Mörn	1095
10m Air Rifle	Andreas Virtanen (ALA)	685.3	David Turner (Jersey)	673.6	Johnny Jonasson (Gotland)	669.8
10m Air Rifle Team	Åland; Tom Mattsson; Andreas Virtanen	1154	Guernsey; Paul Guillou; Lee Roussel	1120	Jersey; Jonathan Bouchard; David Turner	1119
25m Centre Fire Pistol	Jonathon David Patron (GIB)	566	Olof Widing (Gotland)	560	Llorenç Marqués Llorens (Menorca)	552
25m Centre Fire Pistol Team	Jersey; Derek Bernard; David Ward	1093	Gotland; Bengt Hyytiäinen; Olof Widing	1073	Isle of Man; Martin Cowley; Ian Hodgson	1069
25m Standard Pistol	David Ward (Jersey)	547	Jonathon David Patron (GIB)	547	Peter Nordgren (Gotland)	547
25m Standard Pistol Team	Gotland; Bengt Hyytiäinen; Peter Nordgren	1080	Gibraltar; Louis Phillip Baglietto; Jonathon David Patron	1053	Hitra Municipality; Roy Aune; Jorgen Olsen	1027
50m Free Pistol	Tomas Mörn (Åland Islands)	523	Fredrik Blomqvist (Åland Islands)	519	Matthew Reed (Isle of Wight)	518
50m Free Pistol Team	Åland; Fredrik Blomqvist; Tomas Mörn	1030	Gotland; Pontus Nordgren; Christer Winberg	1009	Menorca; Llorenç Marqués Llorens; Pedro Portella	989
50m Smallbore rifle prone	Richard Wilson (Isle of Wight)	696.7	Stephen Bouchard (Jersey)	691.1	Ben Kelly (Isle of Man)	684.4
50m Smallbore rifle prone Team	Isle of Wight; Paul Cotton; Richard Wilson	1161	Isle of Man; Michael Duncalf; Ben Kelly	1161	Gibraltar; Albert Buhagiar; Wayne Piri	1158
100yds Smallbore rifle prone	Björn Ahlby (Gotland)	578	Richard Wilson (Isle of Wight)	575	Wayne Piri (GIB)	567
100 Yards Prone Rifle Team	Gibraltar; Albert Buhagiar; Wayne Piri	1164	Gotland; Birger Johansson; Dick Weström	1156	Isle of Wight; Paul Cotton; Richard Wilson	1153
300m Centre Fire Prone Rifle	Lars-Olof Larsson (Gotland)	578	Steve Le Couilliard (Jersey)	575	Björn Ahlby (Gotland)	567
300M Centre Fire Prone Rifle Team	Gotland; Björn Ahlby; Lars-Olof Larsson	1143	Jersey; Kevin De Gruchy; Steve Le Couilliard	1130	Isle of Wight; Mark Geernaert-Davies; Roy Wade	1111

=== Women ===
Event	Gold		Silver		Bronze	
Sporting Individual	Clementine Kermode-Clague (Isle of Man)	59	Mellissa Thomson (Orkney)	49	Karen Sowerby (Isle of Wight)	48
Sporting Team	Isle of Wight; Andrea George; Michelle Knowles; Karen Sowerby	104	Orkney; Michelle Koster; Mellissa Thomson	102	Faroe Islands; Rannvá Eiriksdóttir Åkerblom	47
UT Individual	Clementine Kermode-Clague (Isle of Man)	57	Sally Anne Stay (Isle of Wight)	56	Pauline Wilson (Isle of Wight)	46
10m Air Pistol	Tara Laine (Guernsey)	467.9	Mary Norman (Jersey)	463.9	Cecilia Lund (Åland Islands)	449.1
10m Air Pistol Team	Jersey; Nikki Holmes; Mary Norman	725	Guernsey; Tara Laine; Rebecca Margetts	705	Åland; Cecilia Lund; Kristina Nordlund	690
10m Air Rifle	Heloise Manasco (GIB)	492.6	Sandra Pettersson (Gotland)	484.8	Josephin Ahlby (Gotland)	480.8
10m Air Rifle Team	Gotland; Josephin Ahlby; Sandra Pettersson	759	Åland; Elin Liewendahl; Kristina Nordlund	752	Isle of Man; Rachel Glover; Lara Ward	745
25m Sport Pistol	Mary Norman (Jersey)	547	Tara Laine (GGY)	545	Eva Widing (Gotland)	531
50m Prone Smallbore Rifle	Rachel Glover (Isle of Man)	589	Sarah Pallot (Jersey)	576	Mary Norman (Jersey)	576
50m Prone Smallbore Rifle Team	Isle of Man; Rachel Glover; Lara Ward	1164	Jersey; Mary Norman; Sarah Pallot	1148	Gotland; Josephin Ahlby; Jehnny Gardelin	1120
NSRA 100 Yards Prone Rifle	Rachel Glover (Isle of Man)	585	Mary Norman (Jersey)	578	Sarah Pallot (Jersey)	569
NSRA 100 Yards Prone Rifle Team	Isle of Man; Rachel Glover; Lara Ward	1154	Jersey; Mary Norman; Sarah Pallot	1144	Gotland; Jehnny Gardelin; Sandra Pettersson	1126
