= National Gallery of the Cayman Islands =

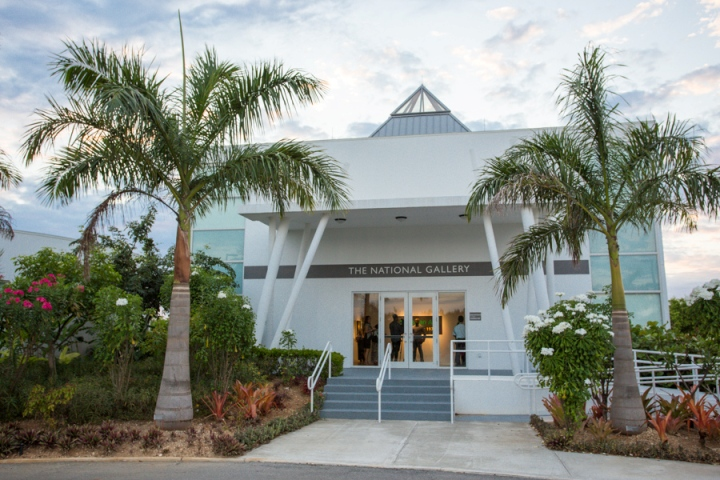
- View from the entrance.
- Established: 1996; 30 years ago
- Location: George Town; Cayman Islands, KY1-1100; Cayman Islands
- Coordinates: 19.315689°N 81.378720°W
- Type: Art museum
- Director: Natalie Urquhart

The National Gallery of the Cayman Islands is an art museum in George Town, in the Cayman Islands. Founded in 1996, NGCI is an arts organisation that seeks to fulfil its mission through exhibitions, artist residencies, education/outreach programmes and research projects in the Cayman Islands.

The NGCI is a non profit institution, part of the Ministry of Health and Culture. Its collection belongs to the government on behalf of the Caymanian public, and entry to the main collection is free of charge.

After a series of temporary sites, in early 2012 NGCI moved into its permanent home on the Esterley Tibbetts Bypass. The current Director of the NGCI is Natalie Urquhart.

It houses the works of members in Caymanian art history including, Gladwyn K. Bush, Charles Long, Bendel Hydes, Davin Ebanks, Simon Tatum, John Reno Jackson, Nickola McCoy Snell, Nasaria Sukoo-Cholette, The Native Sons; Al Ebanks, Wray Banker, Randy Chollette, Chris Christian, Gordon Solomon, Miguel Powery, and Horacio Esteban.
