= Scott High School =

Scott High School may refer to:

== United States ==
- Scott High School (Kentucky), located in Taylor Mill, Kentucky
- Scott High School (Ohio), located in Toledo, Ohio
- Scott High School (West Virginia), located in Madison West Virginia
- Clifford Scott High School, located in East Orange, New Jersey from 1937 to 2002
- North Braddock Scott High School, located in North Braddock, Pennsylvania

== Cayman Islands ==
- Layman E. Scott Sr. High School, located in Cayman Brac, Cayman Islands
