= Cayman Islands =

British Overseas Territory in the Caribbean

- British Overseas Territory
- Flag Coat of arms
- Motto: "He hath founded it upon the seas" (Psalms 24:2 NKJV)
- Anthem: "God Save the King" (Note: "God Save the King" is the national anthem by custom, not statute, and there is no authorised version. Typically only the first verse is usually sung, although the second verse is also often sung as well at state and public events. The words King, he, him, his, used at present, are replaced by Queen, she, her when the monarch is female.)
- Territorial anthem: "Beloved Isle Cayman"
- Location of Cayman Islands (circled in red)

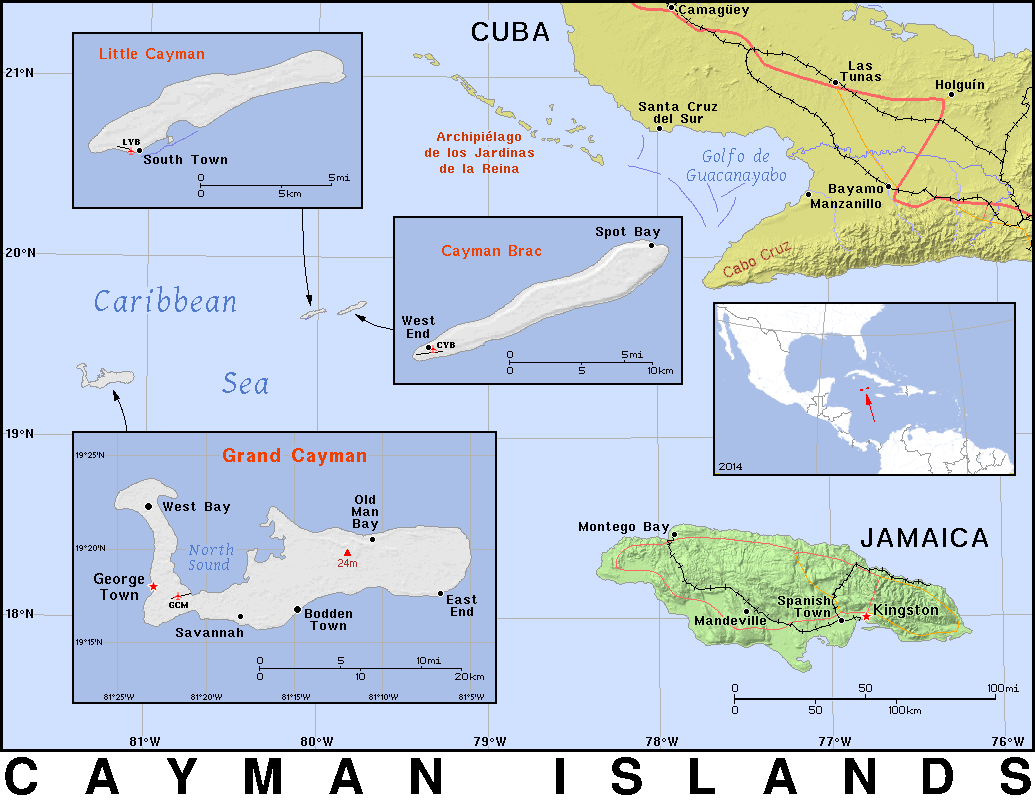
- Sovereignty: United Kingdom
- British control: 1670
- Self-government: 4 July 1959
- Separation from Jamaica: 6 August 1962
- Current constitution: 6 November 2009
- Capital and largest city: George Town; 19.320°N 81.229°W
- Official languages: English
- Vernacular dialect: Cayman Islands English
- Ethnic groups (2025): 36.5% Mixed-race; 31.8% Black; 18.7% White; 10.2% South Asian; 2.8% other
- Religion: 65.3% Christianity; 27% No religion; 4.1% Hinduism; 0.4% Islam; 0.3% Rastafari; 0.2% Judaism; 2.7% not specified
- Demonym(s): Caymanian
- Government: Parliamentary dependency under a constitutional monarchy
  - Monarch: Charles III
  - Governor: Jane Owen
  - Premier: André Ebanks
- Legislature: Parliament

Government of the United Kingdom
  - Minister: Uma Kumaran

Area
  - Total: 264 km^{2} (102 sq mi)
  - Water (%): 0
- Highest elevation: 43 m (141 ft)

Population
  - 2025 estimate: 90,577 (206th)
  - Density: 275.8/km^{2} (714.3/sq mi) (54th)
- GDP (PPP): 2019 estimate
  - Total: $4.78 billion
  - Per capita: $73,600
- GDP (nominal): 2024 estimate
  - Total: CI$6.380 billion (US$7.659 billion)
  - Per capita: CI$72,616 (US$87,174)
- HDI (2013): 0.984 very high
- Currency: Cayman Islands dollar ($; KYD)
- Time zone: UTC−5:00 (EST)
- Date format: dd/mm/yyyy
- Driving side: Left
- Calling code: +1
- UK postcode: KYx-xxxx
- ISO 3166 code: KY
- Internet TLD: .ky
- Website: gov.ky

The Cayman Islands (/ˈkeɪmən/) is a self-governing British Overseas Territory in the western Caribbean. With a population of over 90,000, it is the most populated of all the British Overseas Territories. The 264-square-kilometre (102-square-mile) territory comprises the three islands of Grand Cayman, Cayman Brac and Little Cayman, which are located south of Cuba and north-east of Honduras, between Jamaica and Mexico's Yucatán Peninsula. The capital city is George Town on Grand Cayman, which is the most populous of the three islands.

The Cayman Islands is considered to be part of the geographic Western Caribbean zone as well as the Greater Antilles. The territory is a major tax haven mainly due to the state charging no tax on income earned or stored.

With a GDP per capita of $97,750 in 2023, the Cayman Islands has the highest standard of living in the Caribbean, and one of the highest in the world. Despite its population of almost 90,000, immigrants from over 140 countries and territories reside in the Cayman Islands.

== History ==
=== Origins and colonisation ===
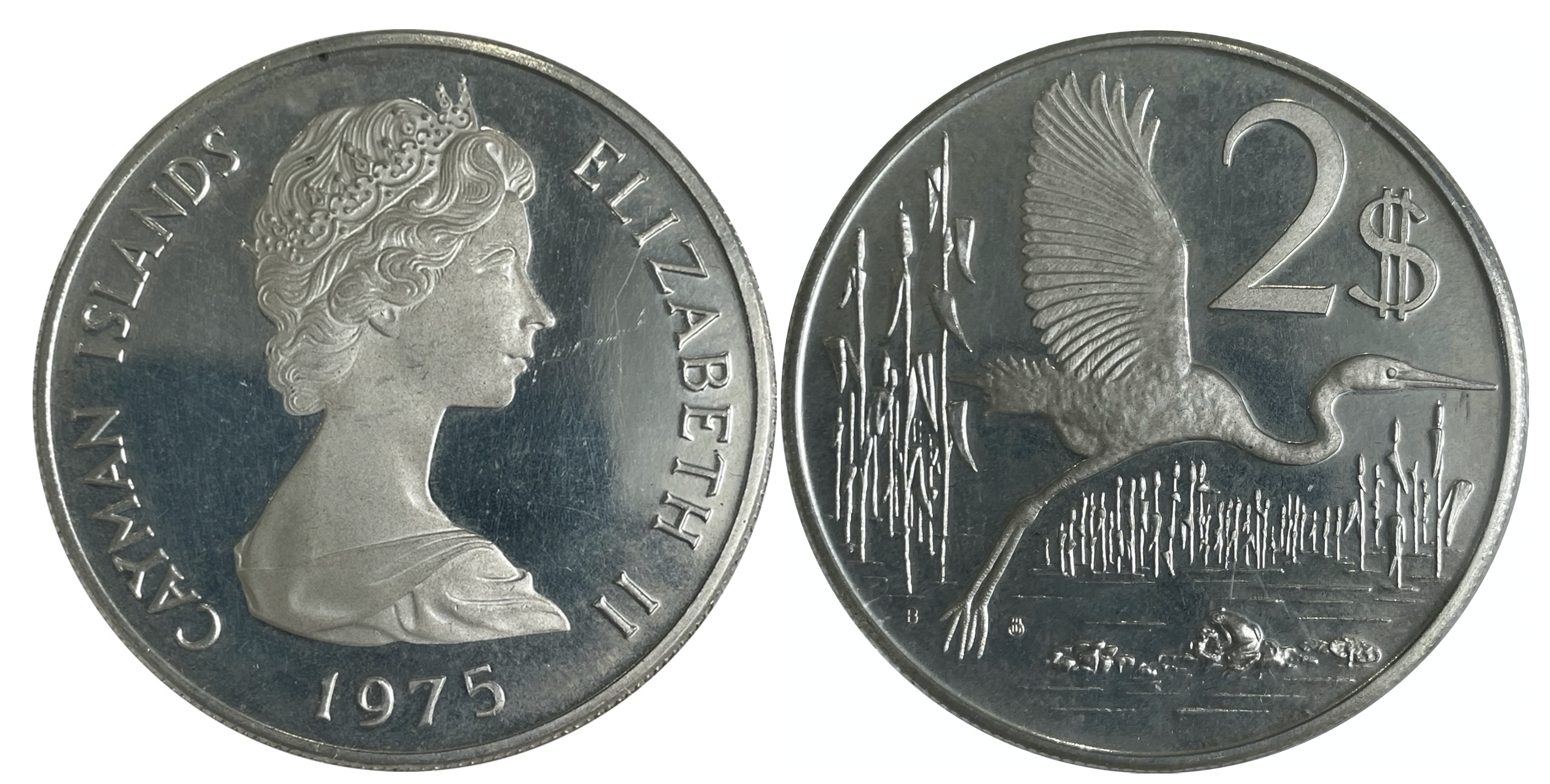
2 dollar Cayman 1975

Evidence has not been found that the islands were occupied before the arrival of the Europeans. The Cayman Islands got their name from the word for crocodile (caiman) in the language of the Arawak-Taíno people. It is believed that the first European to sight the islands was Christopher Columbus, on 10 May 1503, during his final voyage to the Americas. He named them "Las Tortugas", after the large number of turtles found there (which were soon hunted to near-extinction). However, in succeeding decades, the islands began to be referred to as "Caimanas" or "Caymanes".

No immediate colonisation followed Columbus's sighting, but a variety of settlers from various backgrounds eventually arrived, including pirates, shipwrecked sailors, and deserters from Oliver Cromwell's army in Jamaica. Sir Francis Drake briefly visited the islands in 1586.

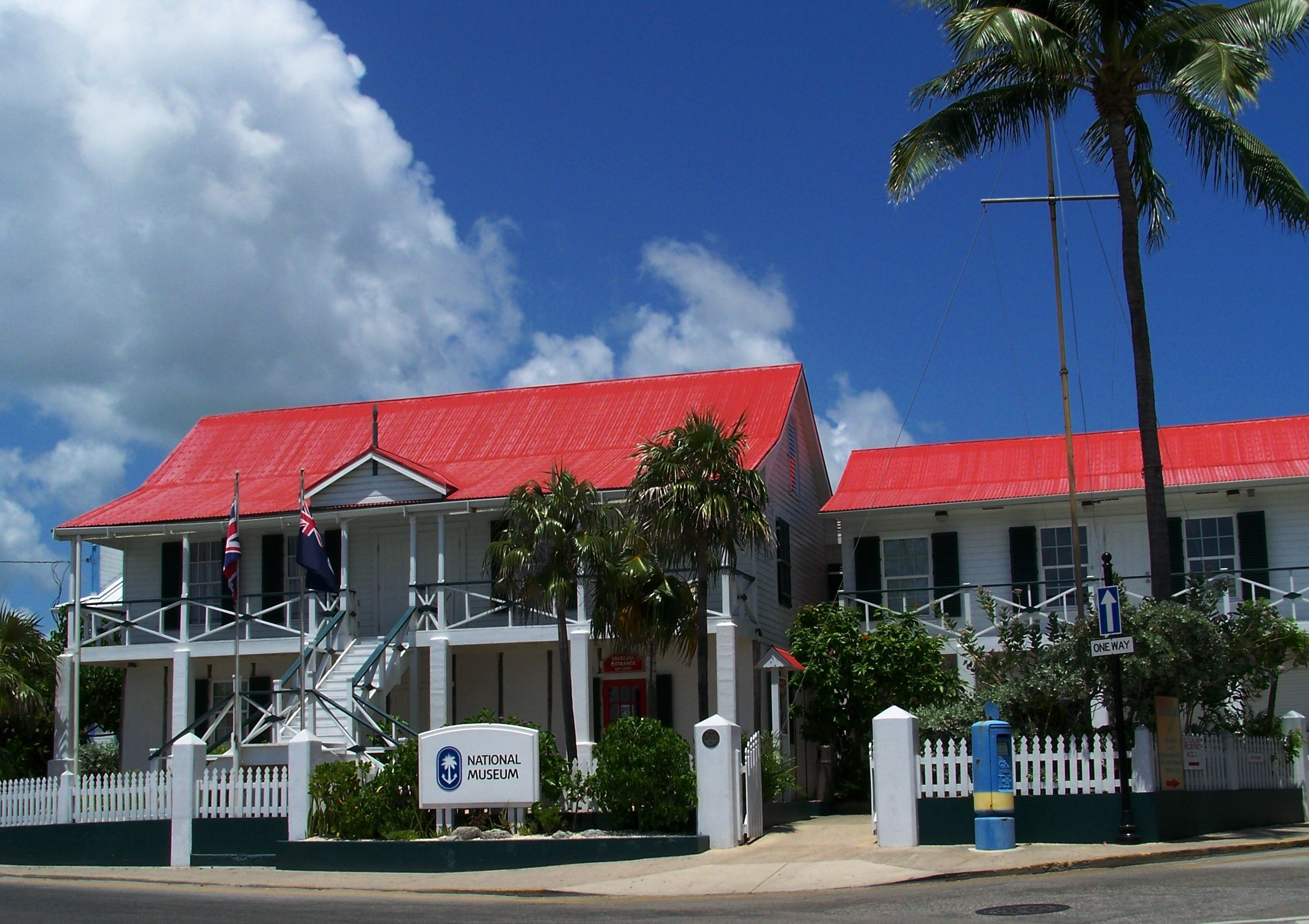
Cayman Islands National Museum, George Town, Grand Cayman

The first recorded permanent inhabitant, Isaac Bodden, was born on Grand Cayman around 1661. He was the grandson of an original settler named Bodden, probably one of Oliver Cromwell's soldiers involved in the capture of Jamaica from Spain in 1655.

England took formal control of the Cayman Islands, along with Jamaica, as a result of the Treaty of Madrid of 1670. That same year saw an attack on a turtle fishing settlement on Little Cayman by the Spanish under Portuguese privateer Manuel Ribeiro Pardal. Following several unsuccessful attempts at settlement in what had by then become a haven for pirates, a permanent English-speaking population in the islands dates from the 1730s. With settlement, after the first royal land grant by the governor of Jamaica in 1734, came the introduction of slaves. Many were purchased and brought to the islands from Africa. That has resulted in the majority of native Caymanians being of African or British descent.

On 8 February 1794, the Caymanians rescued the crews of a group of ten merchant ships, including HMS Convert, an incident that has since become known as the Wreck of the Ten Sail. The ships had struck a reef and run aground during rough seas. Legend has it that King George III rewarded the islanders for their generosity with a promise never to introduce taxes, because one of the ships carried a member of the King's family. Despite the legend, the story is not true.

=== 19th century ===
The first census taken in the islands, in 1802, showed the population on Grand Cayman to be 933, with 545 of those inhabitants being slaves. Slavery was abolished in the Cayman Islands in 1833, following the passing of the Slavery Abolition Act by the British Parliament. At the time of abolition, there were over 950 slaves of African ancestry, owned by 116 families.

On 22 June 1863, the Cayman Islands was officially declared and administered as a dependency of the Crown Colony of Jamaica. The islands continued to be governed as part of the Colony of Jamaica until 1962, when they became a separate Crown colony, after Jamaica became an independent Commonwealth realm.

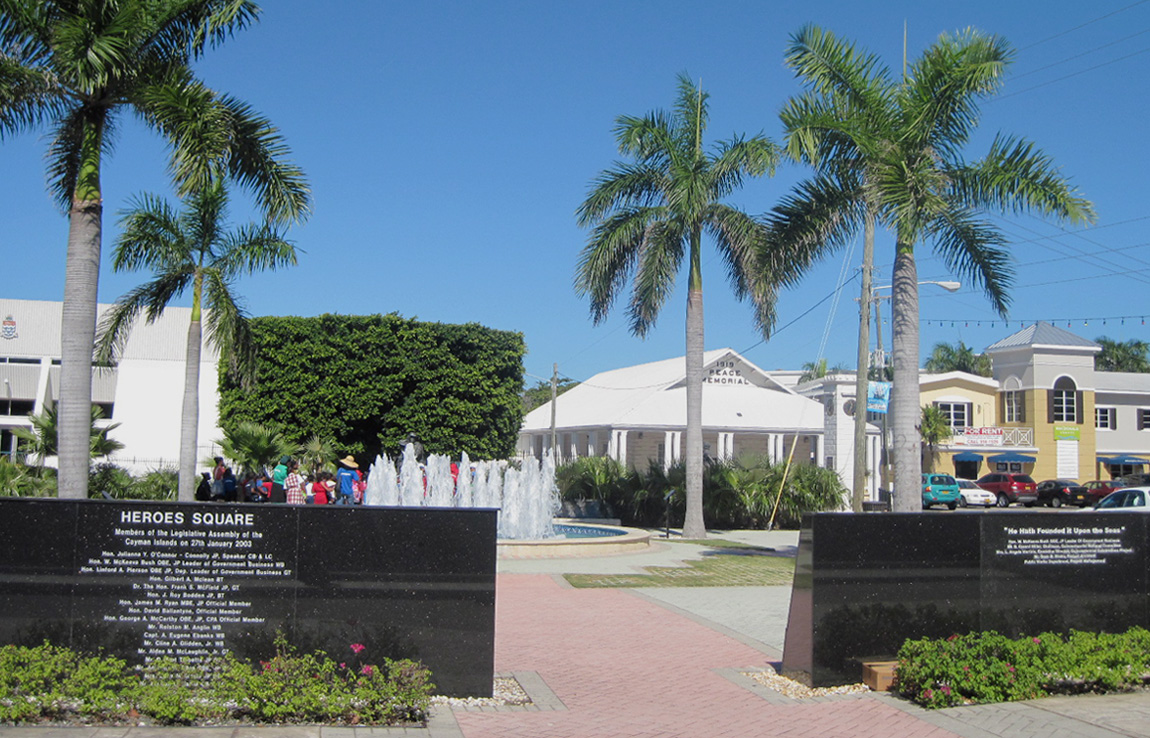
The Heroes Square in the centre of George Town, which commemorates the Cayman Islands' war dead. The Legislative Assembly building is at the left.

=== 20th century ===
In the 1950s, tourism began to flourish, following the opening of Owen Roberts International Airport (ORIA), along with a bank and several hotels, as well as the introduction of a number of scheduled flights and cruise stop-overs. Politically, the Cayman Islands were an internally self-governing territory of Jamaica from 1958 to 1962, but they reverted to direct British rule following the independence of Jamaica in 1962. In 1972, a large degree of internal autonomy was granted by a new constitution, with further revisions being made in 1994. The Cayman Islands government focused on boosting the territory's economy via tourism and the attraction of off-shore finance, both of which mushroomed from the 1970s onwards. Historically, the Cayman Islands has been a tax-exempt destination, and the government has always relied on indirect and not direct taxes. The territory has never levied income tax, capital gains tax, or any wealth tax, making it a popular tax haven.

=== 21st century ===
The constitution was further modified in 2001 and 2009, codifying various aspects of human rights legislation.

On 11 September 2004, the island of Grand Cayman, which lies largely unprotected at sea level, was battered by Hurricane Ivan, the worst hurricane to hit the islands in 86 years. It created an 8-foot (2.4 m) storm surge which flooded many areas of Grand Cayman. An estimated 83% of the dwellings on the island were damaged, with 4% requiring complete reconstruction. A reported 70% of all dwellings suffered severe damage from flooding or wind. Another 26% sustained minor damage from partial roof removal, low levels of flooding, or impact with floating or wind-driven hurricane debris. Power, water, and communications were disrupted for months in some areas. Within two years, a major rebuilding programme on Grand Cayman meant that its infrastructure was almost back to its pre-hurricane condition. Due to the tropical location of the islands, more hurricanes or tropical systems have affected the Cayman Islands than any other region in the Atlantic basin. On average, it has been brushed or directly hit every 2.23 years.

== Geography ==
Map of the Cayman Islands, showing the three main islands about 120 kilometres (75 miles) apart

The islands are in the western Caribbean Sea and are the peaks of an undersea mountain range called the Cayman Ridge (or Cayman Rise). This ridge flanks the Cayman Trough, 6,000 m (20,000 ft) deep which lies 6 km (3.7 mi) to the south. The islands lie in the northwest of the Caribbean Sea, east of Quintana Roo, Mexico and Yucatán State, Mexico, northeast of Costa Rica, north of Panama, south of Cuba and west of Jamaica. They are situated about 700 km (430 mi) south of Miami, 750 km (470 mi) east of Mexico, 366 km (227 mi) south of Cuba, and about 500 km (310 mi) northwest of Jamaica. Grand Cayman is by far the largest, with an area of 197 km^{2} (76 sq mi). Grand Cayman's two "sister islands", Cayman Brac and Little Cayman, are about 120 km (75 mi) east north-east of Grand Cayman and have areas of 38 and 28.5 km^{2} (14.7 and 11.0 sq mi) respectively. The nearest land mass from Grand Cayman is the Canarreos Archipelago (about 240 km or 150 miles away), whereas the nearest from the easternmost island Cayman Brac is the Jardines de la Reina archipelago (about 160 km or 100 miles away) – both of which are part of Cuba.

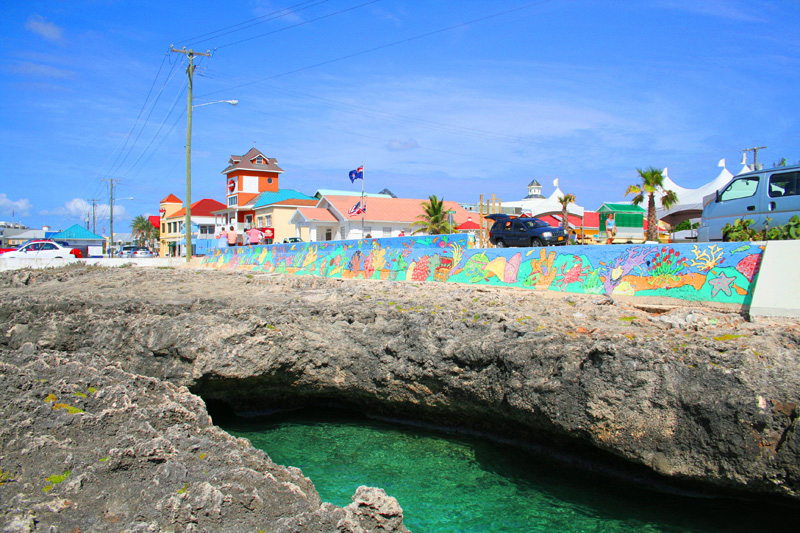
George Town waterfront

All three islands were formed by large coral heads covering submerged ice-age peaks of western extensions of the Cuban Sierra Maestra range and are mostly flat. One notable exception to this is The Bluff on Cayman Brac's eastern part, which rises to 43 m (141 ft) above sea level, the highest point on the islands.

The terrain is mostly a low-lying limestone base surrounded by coral reefs. The portions of prehistoric coral reef that line the coastline and protrude from the water are referred to as ironshore.

=== Flora ===
In Cayman Islands forest cover is around 53% of the total land area, equivalent to 12,720 hectares (ha) of forest in 2020, down from 13,130 hectares (ha) in 1990. In 2020, naturally regenerating forest covered 12,720 hectares (ha) and planted forest covered 0 hectares (ha). Of the naturally regenerating forest 0% was reported to be primary forest (consisting of native tree species with no clearly visible indications of human activity). For the year 2015, 0% of the forest area was reported to be under public ownership, 12% private ownership and 88% with ownership listed as other or unknown.

=== Fauna ===
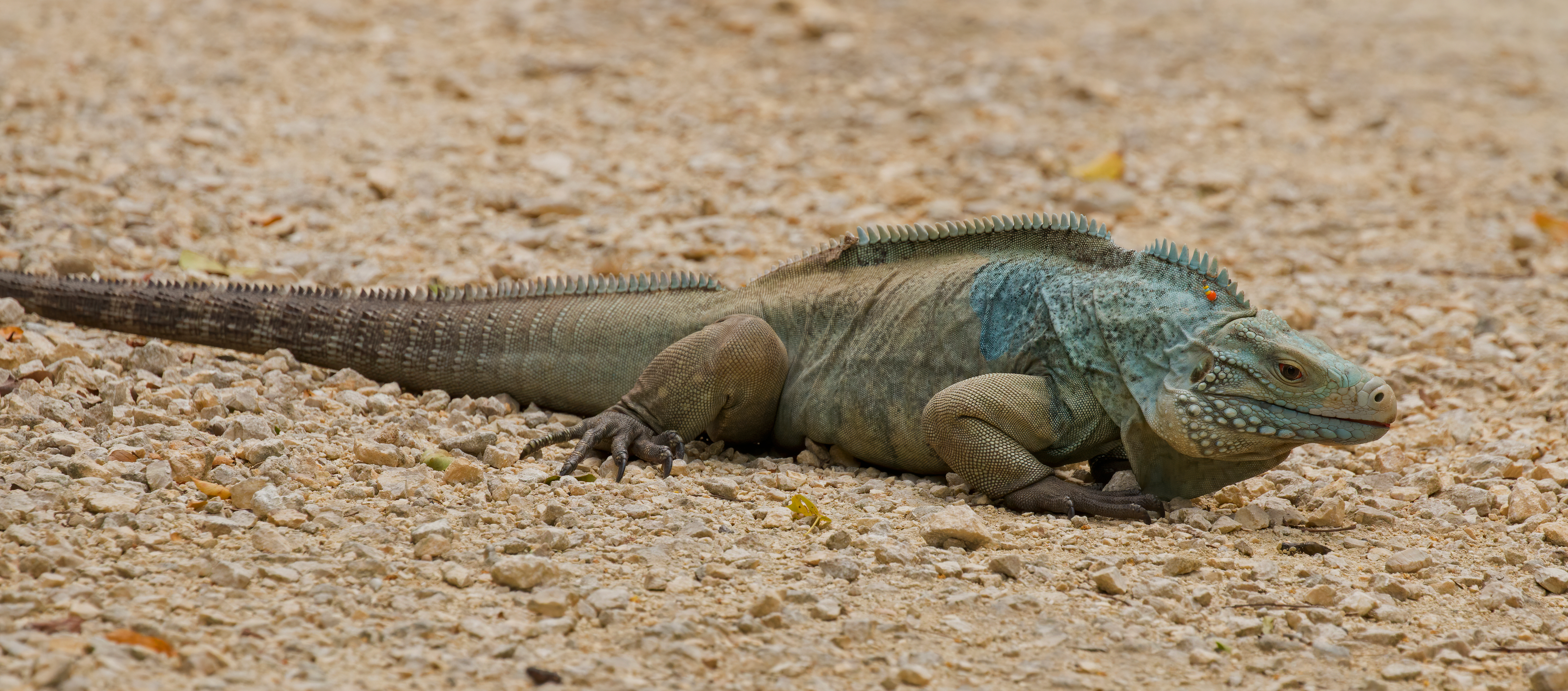
Blue iguana

The mammalian species in the Cayman Islands include the introduced Central American agouti and eight species of bats. At least three now extinct native rodent species were present until the discovery of the islands by Europeans. Marine life around the island of the Grand Cayman includes tarpon, silversides (Atheriniformes), French angelfish (Pomacanthus paru), and giant barrel sponges. A number of cetaceans are found in offshore waters. These species include the goose-beaked whale (Ziphius cavirostris), Blainville's beaked whale (Mesoplodon densirostris) and sperm whale (Physeter macrocephalus).

Cayman avian fauna includes two endemic subspecies of Amazona parrots: Amazona leucocephala hesterna or Cuban amazon, presently restricted to the island of Cayman Brac, but formerly also on Little Cayman, and Amazona leucocephala caymanensis or Grand Cayman parrot, which is native to the Cayman Islands, forested areas of Cuba, and the Isla de la Juventud. Little Cayman and Cayman Brac are also home to red-footed and brown boobies. Although the American barn owl (Tyto furcata) occurs in all three of the islands they are not commonplace. The Cayman Islands also possess five endemic subspecies of butterflies. These butterfly breeds can be viewed at the Queen Elizabeth II Botanic Park on the Grand Cayman.

Among other notable fauna at the Queen Elizabeth II Botanic Park is the critically threatened blue iguana, which is also known as the Grand Cayman iguana (Cyclura lewisi). The blue iguana is endemic to the Grand Cayman particularly because of rocky, sunlit, open areas near the island's shores that are advantageous for the laying of eggs. Nevertheless, habitat destruction and invasive mammalian predators remain the primary reasons that blue iguana hatchlings do not survive naturally.

The Cuban crocodile (Crocodylus rhombifer) once inhabited the islands. And the American crocodile (Crocodylus acutus) is also believed to be slowly repopulating the islands from Cuba. The name "Cayman" is derived from a Carib word for the various crocodilians that inhabited the islands.

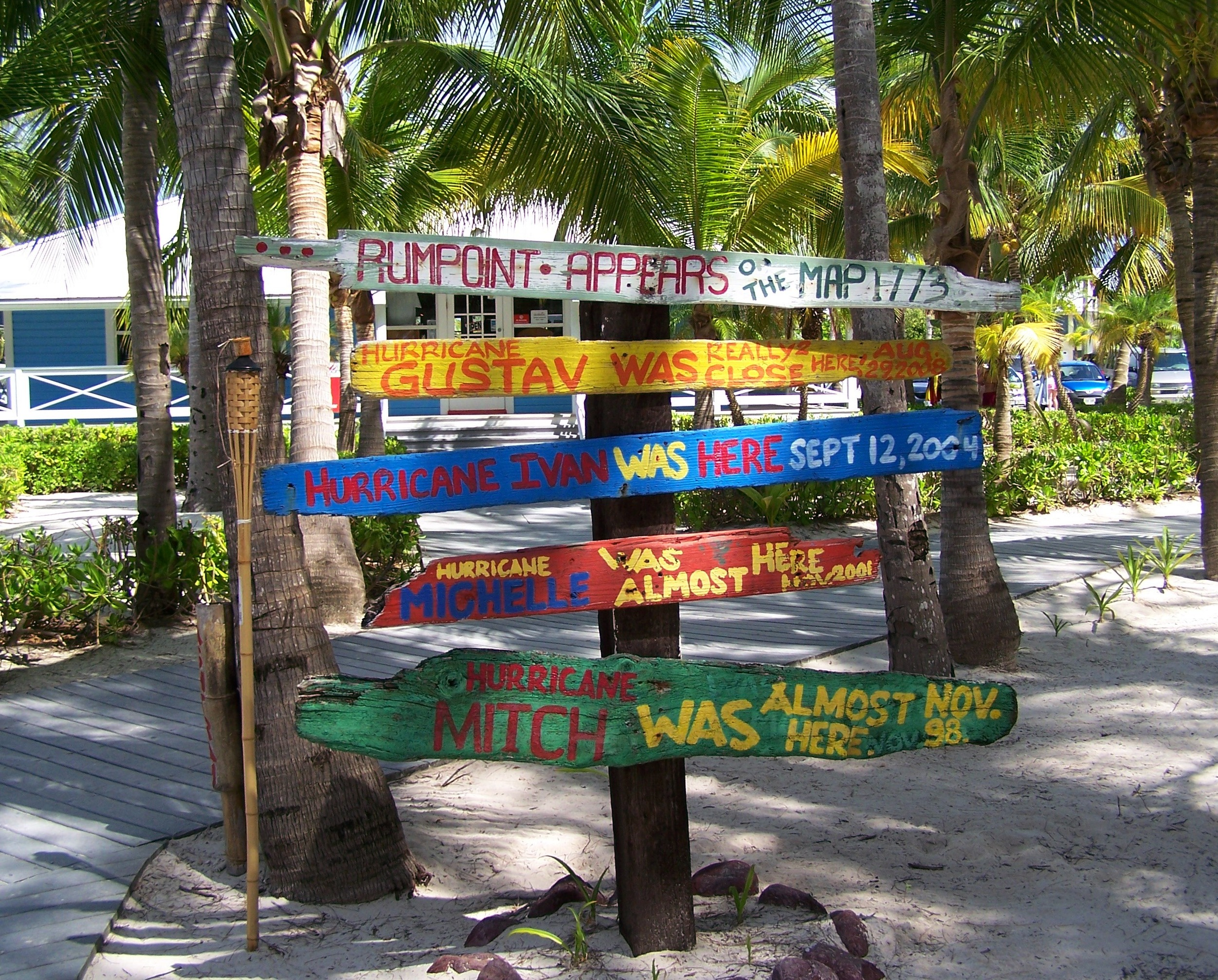
Signs at Rum Point commemorating landed and near-miss hurricanes

=== Climate ===
The Cayman Islands has a tropical wet and dry climate, with a wet season from May to October, and a dry season that runs from November to April. Seasonally, there is little temperature change.

A major natural hazard is the tropical cyclones that form during the Atlantic hurricane season from June to November.

On 11 and 12 September 2004, Hurricane Ivan struck the Cayman Islands. The storm resulted in two deaths and caused significant damage to the infrastructure on the islands. The total economic impact of the storms was estimated to be $3.4 billion.

Climate data for George Town (Owen Roberts International Airport), 1991–2020 normals, extremes 1962–2024
Month	Jan	Feb	Mar	Apr	May	Jun	Jul	Aug	Sep	Oct	Nov	Dec	Year
Record high humidex	39.2	42.6	43.3	43.5	45.4	43.8	45.5	44.8	44.8	44.1	43.1	43.1	45.5
Record high °C (°F)	32.2 (90.0)	31.7 (89.0)	32.2 (90.0)	32.8 (91.0)	34.4 (93.9)	34.4 (94.0)	35.3 (95.5)	35.0 (95.0)	34.7 (94.5)	33.7 (92.7)	33.6 (92.5)	32.2 (90.0)	35.3 (95.5)
Mean daily maximum °C (°F)	28.4 (83.1)	28.7 (83.7)	29.2 (84.6)	30.1 (86.2)	31.0 (87.8)	31.7 (89.0)	32.3 (90.1)	32.3 (90.1)	31.9 (89.4)	31.2 (88.2)	29.6 (85.3)	28.9 (84.0)	30.4 (86.7)
Daily mean °C (°F)	26.0 (78.8)	26.3 (79.3)	26.7 (80.0)	27.7 (81.9)	28.5 (83.3)	29.3 (84.8)	29.7 (85.5)	29.8 (85.7)	29.4 (85.0)	28.6 (83.4)	27.6 (81.7)	26.8 (80.2)	28.1 (82.5)
Mean daily minimum °C (°F)	23.1 (73.6)	22.9 (73.2)	23.1 (73.6)	24.3 (75.7)	25.1 (77.2)	25.8 (78.4)	25.9 (78.6)	26.0 (78.8)	25.7 (78.3)	25.2 (77.4)	24.5 (76.1)	23.6 (74.5)	24.6 (76.3)
Record low °C (°F)	12.2 (54.0)	11.1 (52.0)	12.8 (55.0)	12.2 (54.0)	13.9 (57.0)	16.7 (62.1)	20.0 (68.0)	19.4 (66.9)	20.0 (68.0)	18.9 (66.0)	14.4 (57.9)	14.1 (57.4)	11.1 (52.0)
Average rainfall mm (inches)	54 (2.13)	31 (1.21)	30 (1.17)	34 (1.33)	150 (5.89)	161 (6.34)	135 (5.31)	147 (5.79)	216 (8.52)	244 (9.60)	157 (6.18)	65 (2.57)	1,423 (56.02)
Average rainy days (≥ 0.1mm)	7	6	6	4	10	12	12	14	16	15	12	9	123
Average relative humidity (%)	77	77	76	76	78	79	77	78	80	80	78	78	77
Mean monthly sunshine hours	242.2	224	279	300	279	240	322.9	248	240	248	210	217	3,050.1
Mean daily sunshine hours	7.8	8	9	10	9	8	10.4	8	8	8	7	7	8.4
Average ultraviolet index	8	10	12	12	12	12	12	12	11	10	8	7	11
Source 1: National Weather Service (Cayman Islands)
Source 2: Weather in Cayman Weather Spark Climate-Data

Climate data for George Town
Month	Jan	Feb	Mar	Apr	May	Jun	Jul	Aug	Sep	Oct	Nov	Dec	Year
Average sea temperature °C (°F)	26.6 (79.9)	26.6 (79.9)	26.8 (80.2)	27.7 (81.9)	28.3 (82.9)	28.7 (83.7)	29.2 (84.6)	30.0 (86.0)	29.9 (85.8)	29.3 (84.7)	28.6 (83.5)	28.0 (82.4)	27.9 (82.2)
Source #1: seatemperature.org
Source #2: Weather Atlas

== Demographics ==
=== Demographics and immigration ===
Population by background
Nationalities	percent
Caymanian	28.9%
Jamaican	24.7%
Filipino	7.3%
British	5.7%
Americans	4.1%
Indian	4.2%
Honduran	3.5%
Other Caribbean people	3.4%
Canadian	3.2%
Cuban	1.3%
Other	13.6%

While there are a large number of generational Caymanians, many Caymanians today have roots in almost every part of the world. 52.5% of the population is Non-Caymanian, while 47.5% is Caymanian. Jamaicans, who make up 24.7% of the population, form the largest immigrant community in the country, attributable to not only the close proximity of the Cayman Islands and Jamaica, but also the close cultural, economic and social ties that go back centuries between the two nations, with the Cayman Islands once being a dependency of Jamaica from 1863 until Jamaica's independence from the United Kingdom in 1962, resulting in the Cayman Islands choosing to separate from Jamaica and remain under British rule to this day.

According to the Economics and Statistics Office of the Government of the Cayman Islands, the Cayman Islands had a population of 71,432 at the Census of 10 October 2021, but was estimated by them to have risen to 81,546 as of December 2022, making it the most populous British Overseas Territory. It was revealed in the 2021 census that 56% of the workforce is Non-Caymanian; this is the first time in the territory's history that the number of working immigrants has overtaken the number of working Caymanians. Most Caymanians are of mixed African and European ancestry. Slavery occurred but was not as common compared to other Caribbean islands, and once it was abolished, black and white communities seemed to integrate more compliantly than other Caribbean nations and territories resulting in a more mixed-race population.

The country's demographics are changing rapidly. Immigration plays a large role, and the changing demographics in age have sounded alarm bells in the most recent census. In comparison to the 2010 census, the 2021 census has shown that 36% of Cayman's population growth has been in persons over age 65, while 8% growth was recorded in groups under age 15. This is due to extremely low birth rates among Caymanians, which almost forces the government to seek workers from overseas to sustain the country's economy. This has raised concerns among many young Caymanians, who worry about the workforce becoming increasingly competitive with the influx of workers, as well as rent and property prices going up.

Because the population has skyrocketed over the last decade, former government officials have stressed that the islands need more careful and managed growth. Many have worried that the country's infrastructure and services cannot cope with the surging population. It is believed that given current trends, the population will reach 100,000 before 2030.

=== District populations ===
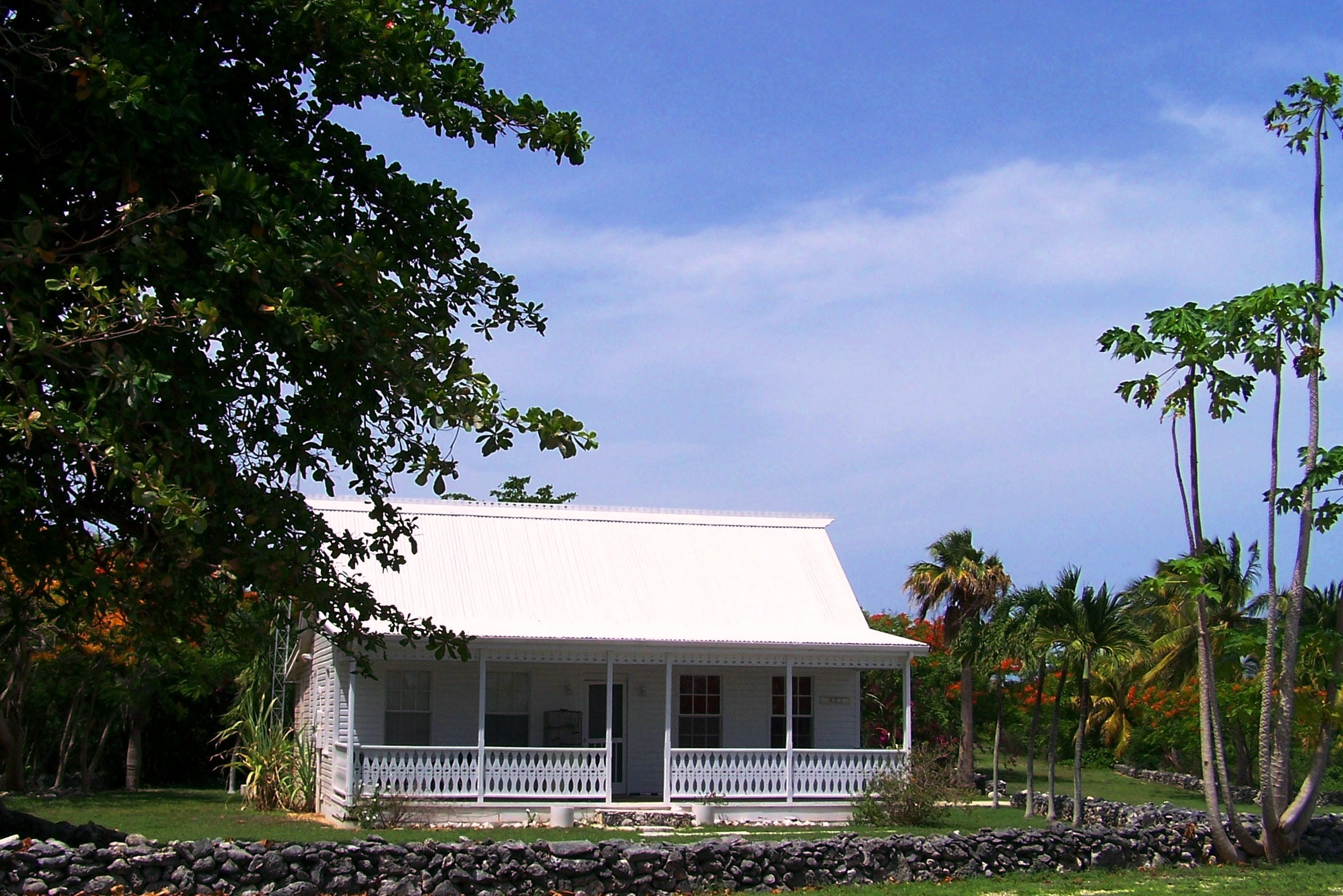
Traditional Caymanian home in East End, Grand Cayman

According to the Economics and Statistics Office, the final result of the 20 October 2021 Census was 71,432; however, according to a late 2022 population report by the same body, the estimated population at the end of 2022 was 81,546, broken down as follows:

Name of district	Area (km^{2})	Population		
Name of district	Area (km^{2})	Census 2010	Census 2021	Estimate late 2022
West Bay	17.4	11,222	15,335	16,943
George Town	38.5	28,089	34,921	40,957
Bodden Town	50.5	10,543	14,845	16,957
North Side	39.4	1,479	1,902	2,110
East End	51.1	1,407	1,846	2,274
Grand Cayman Total	197.0	53,160	69,175	79,242
Little Cayman	26.0	197	182	(Note: Estimate only gives the combined population of the Sister Islands (Little Cayman and Cayman Brac).)
Cayman Brac	36.0	2,099	2,075	-
Sister Islands Total	62.0	2,296	2,257	2,304
Cayman Islands Total	259.0	55,456	71,432	81,546

=== Religion ===
The predominant religion on the Cayman Islands is Christianity. It is practised by 67% of population in 2021, a decline from 80% in 2010. The major denominations include the United Church of Christ, the Church of God, the Anglican Church, the Baptist Church, the Catholic Church, the Seventh-day Adventist Church, and the Pentecostal Church. The Catholic churches in the islands are St. Ignatius Church in George Town, and Christ the Redeemer Church, West Bay and Stella Maris Church in Cayman Brac. The majority of citizens are religious, however, atheism has been on the rise throughout the islands since 2000, with 16.7% now identifying as non-believers, according to the 2021 census. Ports are closed on Sundays and Christian holidays. There is also an active synagogue and Jewish community on the island as well as places of worship in George Town for Jehovah's Witnesses and followers of the Baháʼí faith. Hinduism is the largest non-Christian faith in Cayman Islands forming 1.7% of population. Most of them reside in the capital George Town. The highest proportion of Hindus is in the districts of East End (6.6%) and North Side (3.8%).

Religion in the Cayman Islands (2021 census)
Religion	Population	%
Church of God	13,424	19.5
None	11,502	16.7
Catholic	9,348	13.6
Seventh Day Adventist	5,992	8.7
Nondenominational Christian	5,743	8.3
Baptist	4,765	6.9
Pentecostal	4,689	6.8
Presbyterian	3,914	5.7
Anglican	1,946	2.8
Hinduism	1,191	1.7
Wesleyan Church	1,030	1.5
Jehovah's Witnesses	637	0.9
Methodist	347	0.5
Islam	258	0.4
Rastafari	213	0.3
Judaism	167	0.2
Other religion	2,678	3.9
Unknown	967	1.4
Cayman Islands	68,811	100.0

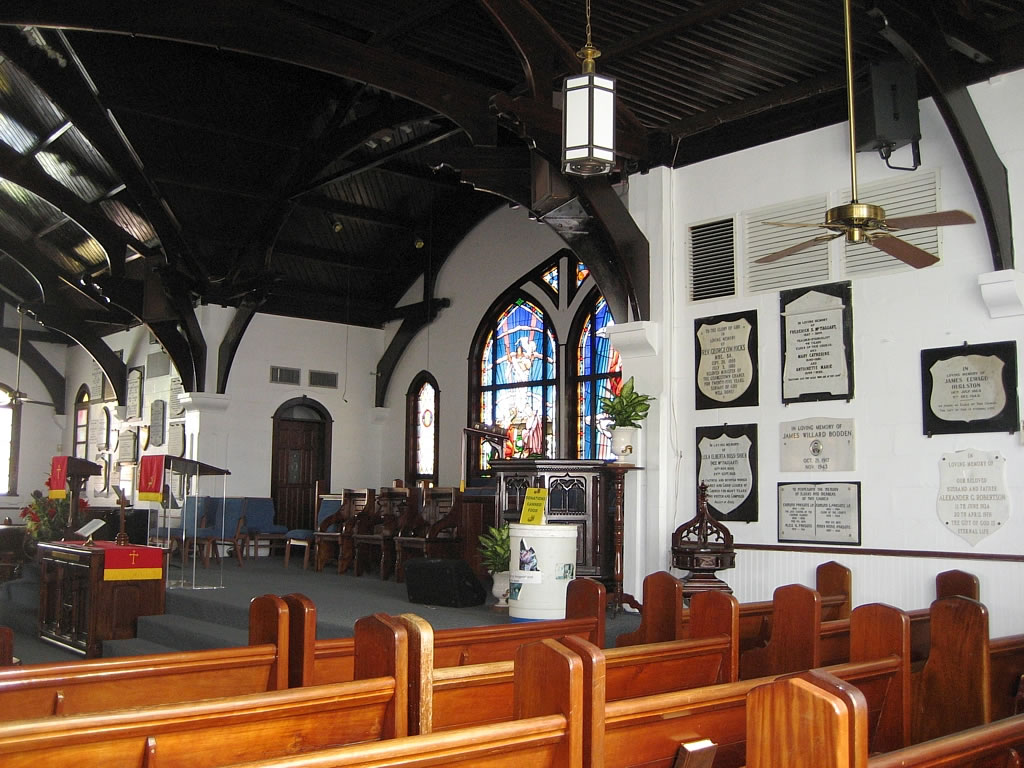
Elmslie United Church, George Town

=== Languages ===
The official language of the Cayman Islands is English (90%). Islanders' accents retain elements passed down from English, Scottish, and Welsh settlers (among others) in a language variety known as Cayman Creole. Caymanians of Jamaican origin speak in their own vernacular (see Jamaican Creole and Jamaican English). It is quite common to hear residents converse in Spanish as many citizens have relocated from Latin America to work and live on Grand Cayman. The Latin American nations with the greatest representation are Honduras, Cuba, Colombia, Nicaragua, and the Dominican Republic. Spanish speakers comprise approximately between 10 and 12% of the population and are predominantly of the Caribbean dialect. Tagalog is spoken by about 8% of inhabitants, most of whom are Filipino residents on work permits.

== Economy ==
The economy of the Cayman Islands is dominated by financial services and tourism, together accounting for 50–60% of Gross Domestic Product. The nation's zero tax rate on income and storage of funds has led to it being used as a tax haven for corporations; there are 100,000 companies registered in the Cayman Islands, more than the population itself. The Cayman Islands have come under criticism for allegations of money laundering and other financial crimes, including a 2016 statement by then US president Barack Obama that described a particular building which was the registered address of over 12,000 corporations as a "tax scam".

The Cayman Islands holds a relatively low unemployment rate of about 4.24% as of 2015, lower than the value of 4.7% that was recorded in 2014.

With an average income of US$109,684 Caymanians have the highest standard of living in the Caribbean. According to the CIA World Factbook, the Cayman Islands' real GDP per capita is the tenth highest in the world, but the CIA's data for Cayman dates to 2018 and is likely to be lower than present-day values. The territory prints its own currency, the Cayman Islands dollar (KYD), which is pegged to the US dollar US$1.227 to 1 KYD. However, in many retail stores throughout the islands, the KYD is typically traded at US$1.25.

Cayman Islands have a high cost of living, even when compared to UK and US. For example, a loaf of multigrain bread is $5.49 (KYD), while a similar loaf sells for $2.47 (KYD) in the US and $1.36 (KYD) in the UK.

The minimum wage (as of February 2021) is $6 KYD for standard positions, and $4.50 for workers in the service industry, where tips supplement income. This contributes to wealth disparity. A small segment of the population lives in condemned properties lacking power and running water.

The government has established a Needs Assessment Unit to relieve poverty in the islands. Local charities, including Cayman's Acts of Random Kindness (ARK) also provide assistance.

The government's primary source of income is indirect taxation: there is no income tax, capital gains tax, or corporation tax. A tariff of 5% to 22% (automobiles 29.5% to 100%) is levied against goods imported into the islands. Few goods are exempt; notable exemptions include books, cameras, and perfume.

=== Tourism ===
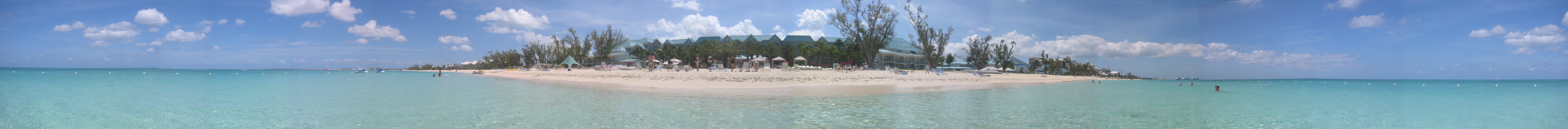
Panorama of Seven Mile Beach in Grand Cayman

Tourist arrivals of 2024 in %

One of Grand Cayman's main attractions is Seven Mile Beach, site of a number of the island's hotels and resorts. Named one of the Ultimate Beaches by Caribbean Travel and Life, Seven Mile Beach (due to erosion over the years, the number has decreased to 5.5 miles) is a public beach on the western shore of Grand Cayman Island. Historical sites in Grand Cayman, such as Pedro St. James Castle in Savannah, also attract visitors.

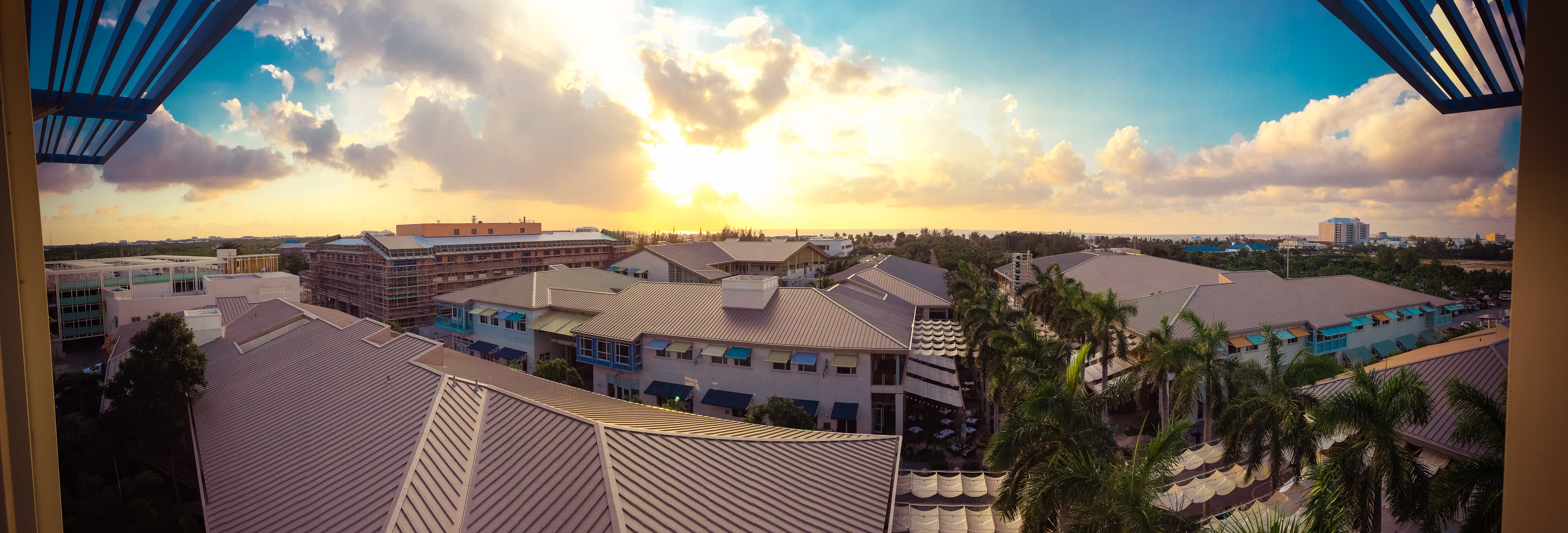
Observation Tower at Camana Bay, north George Town

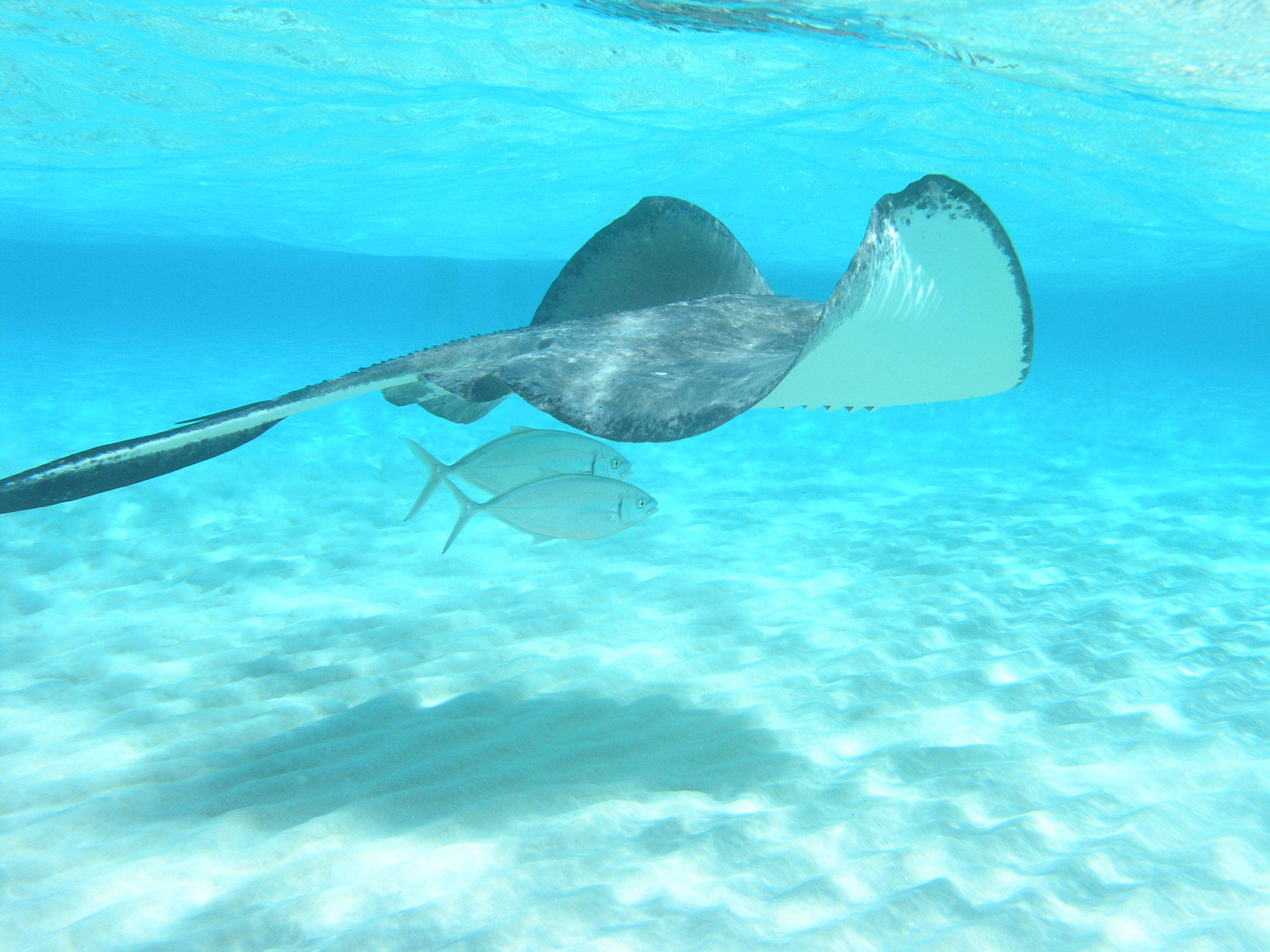
Stingray passing through Stingray City, Grand Cayman

All three islands offer scuba diving, and the Cayman Islands are home to several snorkelling locations where tourists can swim with stingrays. The most popular area to do this is Stingray City, Grand Cayman. Stingray City is a top attraction in Grand Cayman and originally started in the 1980s when divers started feeding squid to stingrays. The stingrays started to associate the sound of the boat motors with food, and thus visit this area year-round.

There are two shipwrecks off the shores of Cayman Brac, including the MV Captain Keith Tibbetts; Grand Cayman also has several shipwrecks off its shores, including one deliberate one. On 30 September 1994, the USS Kittiwake was decommissioned and struck from the Naval Vessel Register. In November 2008 her ownership was transferred for an undisclosed amount to the government of the Cayman Islands, which had decided to sink the Kittiwake in June 2009 to form a new artificial reef off Seven Mile Beach, Grand Cayman. Following several delays, the ship was finally scuttled according to plan on 5 January 2011. The Kittiwake has become a dynamic environment for marine life. Each of the five decks of the ship offers squirrelfish, rare sponges, Goliath groupers, urchins, and more. Experienced and beginner divers are invited to swim around the Kittiwake. Pirates Week is an annual 11-day November festival started in 1977 by the then-Minister of Tourism Jim Bodden to boost tourism during the country's tourism slow season.

Other Grand Cayman tourist attractions include the ironshore landscape of Hell; the 23-acre (93,000 m^{2}) marine theme park "Cayman Turtle Centre: Island Wildlife Encounter", previously known as "Boatswain's Beach"; the production of gourmet sea salt; and the Mastic Trail, a hiking trail through the forests in the centre of the island. The National Trust for the Cayman Islands provides guided tours weekly on the Mastic Trail and other locations.

Another attraction to visit on Grand Cayman is the Observation Tower, located in Camana Bay. The Observation Tower is 75 feet tall and provides 360-degree views across Seven Mile Beach, George Town, the North Sound, and beyond. It is free to the public and climbing the tower has become a popular thing to do in the Cayman Islands.

Points of interest include the East End Light (sometimes called Gorling Bluff Light), a lighthouse at the east end of Grand Cayman island. The lighthouse is the centrepiece of East End Lighthouse Park, managed by the National Trust for the Cayman Islands; the first navigational aid on the site was the first lighthouse in the Cayman Islands.

=== Shipping ===
As of 31 December 2015, 360 commercial vessels and 1,674 pleasure craft were registered in the Cayman Islands totalling 4.3 million GT.

=== Labour ===
The Cayman Islands has a population of 69,656 (as of 2021) and therefore a limited workforce. Work permits may, therefore, be granted to foreigners. On average, there have been more than 24,000+ foreigners holding valid work permits.

==== Work permits for non-citizens ====
To work in the Cayman Islands as a non-citizen, a work permit is required. This involves passing a police background check and a health check. A prospective immigrant worker will not be granted a permit unless certain medical conditions are met, including testing negative for syphilis and HIV. A permit may be granted to individuals on special work.

A foreigner must first have a job to move to the Cayman Islands. The employer applies and pays for the work permit. Work permits are not granted to foreigners who are in the Cayman Islands (unless it is a renewal). The Cayman Islands Immigration Department requires foreigners to remain out of the country until their work permit has been approved.

The Cayman Islands presently imposes a controversial "rollover" in relation to expatriate workers who require a work permit. Non-Caymanians are only permitted to reside and work within the territory for a maximum of nine years unless they satisfy the criteria of key employees. Non-Caymanians who are "rolled over" may return to work for additional nine-year periods, subject to a one-year gap between their periods of work. The policy has been the subject of some controversy within the press. Law firms have been particularly upset by the recruitment difficulties that it has caused. Other less well-remunerated employment sectors have been affected as well. Concerns about safety have been expressed by diving instructors, and realtors have also expressed concerns. Others support the rollover as necessary to protect Caymanian identity in the face of immigration of large numbers of expatriate workers.

Concerns have been expressed that in the long term, the policy may damage the preeminence of the Cayman Islands as an offshore financial centre by making it difficult to recruit and retain experienced staff from onshore financial centres. Government employees are no longer exempt from this "rollover" policy, according to this report in a local newspaper. The governor has used his constitutional powers, which give him absolute control over the disposition of civil service employees, to determine which expatriate civil servants are dismissed after seven years service and which are not.

This policy is incorporated in the Immigration Law (2003 revision), written by the United Democratic Party government, and subsequently enforced by the People's Progressive Movement Party government. Both governments agree to the term limits on foreign workers, and the majority of Caymanians also agree it is necessary to protect local culture and heritage from being eroded by a large number of foreigners gaining residency and citizenship.

==== CARICOM Single Market Economy ====
In recognition of the CARICOM (Free Movement) Skilled Persons Act which came into effect in July 1997 in some of the CARICOM countries such as Jamaica and which has been adopted in other CARICOM countries, such as Trinidad and Tobago it is possible that CARICOM nationals who hold the "A Certificate of Recognition of Caribbean Community Skilled Person" will be allowed to work in the Cayman Islands under normal working conditions.

== Government and politics ==
The Cayman Islands are a British overseas territory, listed by the UN Special Committee of 24 as one of the 17 non-self-governing territories. The current Constitution, incorporating a Bill of Rights, was ordained by a statutory instrument of the United Kingdom in 2009. A 19-seat (not including two non-voting members appointed by the Governor which brings the total to 21 members) Parliament is elected by the people every four years to handle domestic affairs. Of the elected Members of the Parliament (MPs), seven are chosen to serve as government Ministers in a Cabinet headed by the Governor. The Premier is appointed by the Governor. Although geographically remote, the Islands (like other British Overseas Territories) share a direct connection with elements of supervisory governance (as did the now independent Commonwealth Nations) still exercisable by the UK's Government in London, UK.

A Governor is appointed by the King of the United Kingdom on the advice of the British Government to represent the monarch. Governors can exercise complete legislative and executive authority if they wish through blanket powers reserved to them in the constitution. Bills which have passed the Parliament require royal assent before becoming effective. The Constitution empowers the Governor to withhold royal assent in cases where the legislation appears to be repugnant to or inconsistent with the Constitution or affects the rights and privileges of the Parliament or the Royal Prerogative, or matters reserved to the Governor by article 55. The executive authority of the Cayman Islands is vested in the King, Charles III, and is exercised by the Government, consisting of the Governor and the Cabinet. There is an office of the Deputy Governor, who must be a Caymanian and have served in a senior public office. The Deputy Governor is the acting Governor when the office of Governor is vacant, or the Governor is not able to discharge their duties or is absent from the Cayman Islands. The current Governor of the Cayman Islands is Jane Owen.

The Cabinet is composed of two official members and seven elected members, called Ministers; one of whom is designated Premier. The premier can serve for two consecutive terms. After two terms the premier is barred from attaining the office again. Although an MP can only be premier twice any person who meets the qualifications and requirements for a seat in the Parliament can be elected to the Parliament indefinitely.

There are two official members of the Parliament, the Deputy Governor and the Attorney General. They are appointed by the Governor in accordance with His Majesty's instructions, and although they have seats in the Parliament, under the 2009 Constitution, they do not vote. They serve in a professional and advisory role to the MPs, the Deputy Governor represents the Governor who is a representative of the King and the British Government. While the Attorney General serves to advise on legal matters and has special responsibilities in Parliament, they are generally responsible for changes to the Penal code.

The seven Ministers are voted into office by the 19 elected members of the Parliament of the Cayman Islands. One of the Ministers, the leader of the majority political party, is appointed Premier by the Governor.

After consulting the Premier, the Governor allocates a portfolio of responsibilities to each Cabinet Minister. Under the principle of collective responsibility, all Ministers are obliged to support in the Parliament any measures approved by Cabinet.

Almost 80 departments, sections and units carry out the business of government, joined by a number of statutory boards and authorities set up for specific purposes, such as the Port Authority, the Civil Aviation Authority, the Immigration Board, the Water Authority, the University College Board of Governors, the National Pensions Board and the Health Insurance Commission.

Since 2000, there have been two official major political parties: The Cayman Democratic Party (CDP) and the People's Progressive Movement (PPM). While there has been a shift to political parties, many contending for office still run as independents. The two parties are notably similar, though they consider each other rivals in most cases, their differences are generally in personality and implementation rather than actual policy. The Cayman Islands generally lacks any form of organised political parties. As of the May 2017 General Election, members of the PPM and CDP have joined with three independent members to form a government coalition despite many years of enmity.

Before the 2021 Caymanian general election, leader of the CDP McKeeva Bush received a two-month suspended jail sentence for assaulting a woman in February 2020 leading to a no-confidence motion against him. Premier McLaughlin asked Governor Martyn Roper to dissolve Parliament on 14 February, triggering early elections instead of having the vote on the motion. In the lead-up to the election, the Democratic Party was described as "[appearing] to be defunct" as figures previously of the party (including Bush) instead contested as independents.

=== Police ===
Policing in the country is provided chiefly by the RCIPS or Royal Cayman Islands Police Service and the CICBC or Cayman Islands Customs & Border Control. These two agencies co-operate in aspects of law enforcement, including their joint marine unit.

=== Military and defence ===
The defence of the Cayman Islands is the responsibility of the United Kingdom. The Royal Navy generally maintains a ship on station in the Caribbean (usually a River-class offshore patrol vessel) and, from time-to-time, the Royal Navy or Royal Fleet Auxiliary may deploy another ship as a part of Atlantic Patrol (NORTH) tasking. These ships' main mission in the region is to maintain British sovereignty for the overseas territories, provide humanitarian aid and disaster relief during disasters such as hurricanes, which are common in the area, and to conduct counter-narcotic operations. In July 2024, the patrol vessel HMS Trent (which had temporarily replaced her sister ship HMS Medway on her normal Caribbean tasking) deployed to the islands to provide assistance in the aftermath of Hurricane Beryl.

==== Cayman Islands Regiment ====
On 12 October 2019, the government announced the formation of the Cayman Islands Regiment, a new British Armed Forces unit. The Cayman Islands Regiment which became fully operational in 2020, with an initial 35–50 personnel of mostly reservists. Between 2020 through 2021 the Regiment grew to over a hundred personnel and over the next several years expected to grow to over several hundred personnel.

In mid-December 2019, recruitment for commanding officers and junior officers began, with the commanding officers expected to begin work in January 2020 and the junior officers expected to begin in February 2020.

In January 2020, the first officers were chosen for the Cayman Islands Regiment.

Since the formation of the Regiment, it has been deployed on a few operational tours providing HADR, or Humanitarian Aid and Disaster Relief as well as assisting with the COVID-19 Pandemic.

==== Cadet Corps ====
The Cayman Islands Cadet Corps was formed in March 2001 and carries out military-type training with teenage citizens of the country.

==== Coast Guard ====
In 2018, the PPM-led Coalition government pledged to form a coast guard to protect the interests of the Cayman Islands, especially in terms of illegal immigration and illegal drug importation as well as search and rescue. In mid-2018, the Commander and second-in-Command of the Cayman Islands Coast Guard were appointed. Commander Robert Scotland was appointed as the first commanding officer and Lieutenant Commander Leo Anglin was appointed as Second-in-Command.

In mid-2019, the commander and second-in-command took part in international joint operations with the United States Coast Guard and the Jamaica Defence Force Coast Guard called Operation Riptide. This makes it the first deployment for the Cayman Islands Coast Guard and the first in ten years any Cayman Representative has been on a foreign military ship for a counternarcotic operation.

In late November 2019, it was announced that the Cayman Islands Coast Guard would become operational in January 2020, with initial total of 21 Coast Guardsmen half of which would come from the joint marine unit, with further recruitment in the new year. One of the many taskings of the Coast Guard will be to push enforcement of all laws that apply to the designated Wildlife Interaction Zone.

On 5 October 2021, the Cayman Islands Parliament passed the Cayman Islands Coast Guard Act thus establishing the Cayman Islands Coast Guard as a uniformed and disciplined department of Government.

=== Taxation ===
No direct taxation is imposed on residents and Cayman Islands companies. The government receives the majority of its income from indirect taxation. Duty is levied against most imported goods, which is typically in the range of 22% to 25%. Some items are exempted, such as baby formula, books, cameras, and electric vehicles, while certain items are taxed at 5%. Duty on automobiles depends on their value. The duty can amount to 29.5% up to $20,000.00 KYD CIF (cost, insurance and freight) and up to 42% over $30,000.00 KYD CIF for expensive models. The government charges flat licensing fees on financial institutions that operate in the islands and there are work permit fees on foreign labour. A 13% government tax is placed on all tourist accommodations in addition to a US$37.50 airport departure tax which is built into the cost of an airline ticket. There is a 7.5% sales tax on the proceeds of the sale of the property, payable by the purchaser. There are no taxes on corporate profits, capital gains, or personal income. There are no estate or death inheritance taxes payable on Cayman Islands real estate or other assets held in the Cayman Islands.

The legend behind the lack of taxation comes from the Wreck of the Ten Sail, when multiple ships ran aground on the reef off the north coast of Grand Cayman. Local fishermen are said to have then sailed out to rescue the crew and salvage goods from the wrecks. It is said that out of gratitude, and due to their small size, King George III then issued the edict that the citizens of the country of the Cayman Islands would never pay tax. There is, however, no documented evidence for this story besides oral tradition.

=== Foreign relations ===
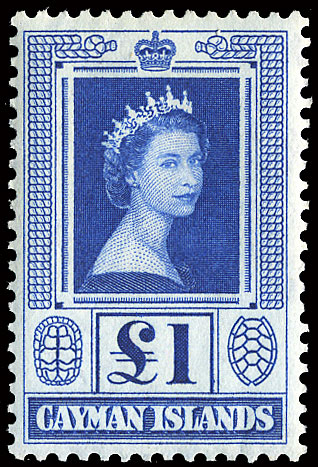
Postage stamp with a portrait of Queen Elizabeth II, 1953

Foreign policy is controlled by the United Kingdom, as the islands remain an overseas territory of the United Kingdom. Although in its early days, the Cayman Islands' most important relationships were with Britain and Jamaica, in recent years, as a result of economic dependence, a relationship with the United States has developed.

Though the Cayman Islands is involved in no major international disputes, they have come under some criticism due to the use of their territory for narcotics trafficking and money laundering. In an attempt to address this, the government entered into the Narcotics Agreement of 1984 and the Mutual Legal Assistance Treaty of 1986 with the United States, to reduce the use of their facilities associated with these activities. In more recent years, they have stepped up the fight against money laundering, by limiting banking secrecy, introducing requirements for customer identification and record keeping, and requiring banks to co-operate with foreign investigators.

Due to their status as an overseas territory of the UK, the Cayman Islands has no separate representation either in the United Nations or in most other international organisations. However, the Cayman Islands still participates in some international organisations, being an associate member of CARICOM and UNESCO, and a member of a sub-bureau of Interpol.

== Emergency services ==
Access to emergency services is available using 9-1-1, the emergency telephone number, the same number as is used in Canada and the United States. The Cayman Islands Department of Public Safety's Communications Centre processes 9-1-1 and non-emergency police assistance, ambulance service, fire service and search and rescue calls for all three islands. The Communications Centre dispatches RCIP and EMS units directly; the Cayman Islands Fire Service maintains their own dispatch room at the airport fire station.

The police services are handled by the Royal Cayman Islands Police Service. The fire services are handled by the Cayman Islands Fire Service. There are 4 main hospitals in the Cayman Islands, private and public health in the Cayman Islands with various localised health clinics around the islands.

== Infrastructure ==
=== Ports ===
George Town is the port capital of Grand Cayman. There are no berthing facilities for cruise ships, but up to four cruise ships can anchor in designated anchorages. There are three cruise terminals in George Town, the North, South, and Royal Watler Terminals. The ride from the ship to the terminal is about 5 minutes.

=== Airports and airlines ===
There are three airports which serve the Cayman Islands. The islands' national flag carrier is Cayman Airways, with Owen Roberts International Airport hosting the airline as its hub.

• Owen Roberts International Airport • Charles Kirkconnell International Airport • Edward Bodden Airfield

=== Main highways ===
There are three highways, as well as crucial feeder roads that serve the Cayman Islands capital city, George Town. Residents in the east of the city will rely on the East-West Arterial Bypass to go into George Town; as well as Shamrock Road coming from Bodden Town and the eastern districts. Other main highways and carriageways include:

• Linford Pierson Highway (most popular roadway into George Town from the east) • Esterly Tibbetts Highway (serves commuters to the north of the city and West Bay) • North Sound Road (main road for Central George Town) • South Sound Road (used by commuters to the south of the city) • Crewe Road (alternative to taking Linford Pierson Highway)

== Education ==
=== Primary and secondary schools ===
The Cayman Islands Education Department operates state schools. Caymanian children are entitled to free primary and secondary education. There are two public high schools on Grand Cayman, John Gray High School and Clifton Hunter High School, and one on Cayman Brac, Layman E. Scott High School. Various churches and private foundations operate several private schools.

=== Colleges and universities ===
The University College of the Cayman Islands has campuses on Grand Cayman and Cayman Brac and is the only government-run university on the Cayman Islands.

The International College of the Cayman Islands is a private college in Grand Cayman. The college was established in 1970 and offers associate's, bachelor's and master's degree programmes. Grand Cayman is also home to St. Matthew's University, which includes a medical school and a school of veterinary medicine. Truman Bodden Law School, a branch of the University of Liverpool, is based on Grand Cayman.

The Cayman Islands Civil Service College, a unit of the Cayman Islands government organised under the Portfolio of the Civil Service, is in Grand Cayman. Co-situated with University College of the Cayman Islands, it offers both degree programmes and continuing education units of various sorts. The college opened in 2007 and is also used as a government research centre.

There is a University of the West Indies Open campus in the territory.

== Sports ==
At the 2026 CARIFTA Aquatics Championships in Martinique, 10-year-old artistic swimmer Aubrey Bouliane became the youngest documented athlete to win a gold medal representing the Cayman Islands. Bouliane won the gold medal in the 12 and Under Artistic Swimming Duet event alongside her partner, Isabelle Youn, helping the Cayman Aquatics team reach a historic high of 49 total medals at the regional tournament.

Truman Bodden Sports Complex is a multi-use complex in George Town. The complex is separated into an outdoor, six-lane 25-metre (82 ft) swimming pool, full purpose track and field and basketball/netball courts. The field surrounded by the track is used for association football matches as well as other field sports.

Association football is the national and most popular sport, with the Cayman Islands national football team representing the Cayman Islands in FIFA.

The Cayman Islands Basketball Federation joined the international basketball governing body FIBA in 1976. The country's national team attended the Caribbean Basketball Championship for the first time in 2011. Cayman Islands National Male National Team has won back-to-back Gold Medal victories in 2017 and 2019 Natwest Island Games.

Rugby union is a developing sport, and has its own national men's team, women's team, and Sevens team.

The Cayman Islands are a member of FIFA, the International Olympic Committee and the Pan American Sports Organisation, and also competes in the biennial Island Games.

The Cayman Islands are a member of the International Cricket Council which they joined in 1997 as an Affiliate, before becoming an Associate member in 2002. The Cayman Islands national cricket team represents the islands in international cricket. The team has previously played the sport at first-class, List A and Twenty20 level. It competes in Division Five of the World Cricket League.

Squash is popular in the Cayman Islands with a vibrant community of mostly ex-pats playing out of the 7-court South Sound Squash Club. In addition, the women's professional squash association hosts one of their major events each year in an all-glass court being set up in Camana Bay. In December 2012, the former Cayman Open will be replaced by the Women's World Championships, the largest tournament in the world.

Flag football (CIFFA) has men's, women's, and mixed-gender leagues.

Other organised sports leagues include softball, beach volleyball, Gaelic football and ultimate frisbee.

The Cayman Islands Olympic Committee was founded in 1973 and was recognised by the IOC (International Olympic Committee) in 1976.

In April 2005 Black Pearl Skate Park was opened in Grand Cayman by Tony Hawk. At the time the 52,000 square feet (4,800 m^{2}) park was the largest in the Western Hemisphere.

In February 2010, the first purpose-built track for kart racing in the Cayman Islands was opened. Corporate karting leagues at the track have involved widespread participation with 20 local companies and 227 drivers taking part in the 2010 Summer Corporate Karting League.

In December 2022, swimmer Jordan Crooks became the first Caymanian athlete to become world champion in any sport, after winning the gold medal in the 50 m freestyle event at the 2022 FINA World Swimming Championships (25 m). In addition, during the 2024 World Aquatics Swimming Championships (25 m), he established a new world record in the 50 m freestyle event with a time of 19.90, becoming the first swimmer in history to break the 20-second barrier.

== Arts and culture ==
=== Music ===
The Cayman National Cultural Foundation manages the F.J. Harquail Cultural Centre and the US$4 million Harquail Theatre. The Cayman National Cultural Foundation, established in 1984, helps to preserve and promote Cayman folk music, including the organisation of festivals such as the Cayman Islands International Storytelling Festival, the Cayman JazzFest, Seafarers Festival and Cayfest. The jazz, calypso and reggae genres of music feature prominently in Cayman music as celebrated cultural influences.

=== Art ===
The National Gallery of the Cayman Islands is an art museum in George Town. Founded in 1996, NGCI is an arts organisation that seeks to fulfil its mission through exhibitions, artist residencies, education/outreach programmes and research projects in the Cayman Islands. The NGCI is a non-profit institution, part of the Ministry of Health and Culture.

== Media ==
There are two print newspapers currently in circulation throughout the islands: the Cayman Compass and The Caymanian Times. Online news services include Cayman Compass, Cayman News Service, Cayman Marl Road, The Caymanian Times and Real Cayman News. Olive Hilda Miller was the first paid reporter to work for a Cayman Islands newspaper, beginning her career on the Tradewinds newspaper, which her work helped to establish.

Local radio stations are broadcast throughout the islands.

Feature films that have been filmed in the Cayman Islands include: The Firm, Haven, Cayman Went and Zombie Driftwood.

Television in the Cayman Islands consist of four over-the-air broadcast stations, CompassTV (subsidiary of Compass Media, which also runs Cayman Compass) – Trinity Broadcasting Network – CIGTV (the government-owned channel) – Seventh Day Adventist Network. Cable television is available in the Cayman Islands through three providers, C3 Pure Fibre – FLOW TV – Logic TV. Satellite television is provided by Dish Direct TV. In the past, between 1992 and 2019, there was also Cayman 27.

Broadband is widely available on the Cayman Islands, with Digicel, C3 Pure Fibre, FLOW and Logic all providing super fast fibre broadband to the islands.

== Notable Caymanians ==
- James M. Bodden (born 1930), First National Hero
- Truman Bodden OBE (born 1945), politician
- Gladwyn K. Bush MBE (1914–2003), folk painter
- McKeeva Bush, JP (born 1955), politician
- William Warren Conolly OBE, JP (1920–2008), politician and attorney
- Kenneth Dart (born 1955), businessman, owns Camana Bay.
- Selita Ebanks (born 1983), fashion model
- Frank E. Flowers (born 1979), filmmaker, director and screenwriter
- Emily Greenwood, classicist
- Sybil Joyce Hylton MBE (1913–2006), community volunteer
- John Reno Jackson (born 1995), multidisciplinary artist
- Thomas Jefferson OBE (1941–2006), politician
- Sir Alden McLaughlin KCMG MBE KC JP (born 1961), politician, former Premier of the Cayman Islands
- Sybil I. McLaughlin MBE, JP (1928–2022), First Speaker of the House
- Edna Moyle OBE (1942–2013), politician and Speaker of the House
- George Nowak (born ca.1950), aka The Barefoot Man, entertainer and songwriter
- Bernard K. Passman (1916–2007), sculptor and jeweller
- David Ritch OBE, JP (born 1951), attorney and bank director
- Leila Ross-Shier (1886–1968), musician, educator and composer of "Beloved Isle Cayman"
- Kurt Tibbetts OBE (born 1954), politician
- Jeffrey Webb (born 1964), football executive indicted for corruption
- Mary Evelyn Wood (1900–1978), nurse and politician
- Leila Yates (1899–1996), pioneering nurse and midwife

=== Sport ===
- Jordan Crooks (born 2002), Olympic swimmer and world champion
- Ronald Forbes (born 1985), Olympic track athlete
- Brett Fraser (born 1989), Olympic competition swimmer
- Shaune Fraser (born 1988), Olympic swimmer and attorney
- Fabio Gall (born 1993), footballer
- Kemar Hyman (born 1989), Olympic sprinter
- Edison Mclean (born 1969), gold medalist in Olympic skeet shooting
- Cydonie Mothersille (born 1978), former Olympic sprinter
- Raegan Rutty (born 2002), Olympic artistic gymnast
- Kyffin Simpson (born 2004), racing driver
- Cameron Stafford (born 1992), Caribbean junior squash champion
- Kareem Streete-Thompson (born 1973), Olympic long-jumper
- Dow Travers (born 1987), Olympic alpine skier, rugby union player and entrepreneur

== See also ==
- Outline of the Cayman Islands
- Index of Cayman Islands–related articles
- List of isolated islands and archipelagos
