= Mixed-race Caymanians =

Ethnic group in the Cayman Islands

Mixed-Race Caymanians
Total population
- est. 34,820 (2022); 42.7% of the Cayman Islands population

Regions with significant populations
- Throughout the Cayman Islands

Languages
- English • Cayman Islands English • Jamaican Patois • Spanish • Bay Islands English • Tagalog • Hindi

Religion
- Primarily Christianity

Related ethnic groups
- English, Scottish, Americans, Jamaicans, Cubans, Hondurans, Filipinos, Indians

Mixed-Race Caymanians refers to citizens of the Cayman Islands with a multiracial background. The majority of the population is mixed-race, with most being of English and African ancestry, tracing their lineage back to early English and Scottish settlers, as well as enslaved people brought to the islands from Africa. There is also a large number of mixed-race Caymanians of Latin American origin, most notably with ties to Honduras and Cuba. Mixed-race Caymanians of Indian and Filipino descent are also a growing community as the islands have seen a significant increase in South and South-East Asian immigration since the early 2000s.
