= Needs Assessment Unit =

Agency of the Government of the Cayman Islands

The Needs Assessment Unit is an agency of the Government of the Cayman Islands. It was established by the Poor Persons (Relief) Law in January 1964 for the relief of poverty. The law was revised in 1997.

Assistance can be provided with:

- Rental assistance: Temporary financial assistance for monthly rental payments. (393 families received assistance to 30 June 2014)
- Food Voucher Program: Temporary provision of gift cards or certificates for the purchase of groceries. (1,117 persons/families assisted to 30 June 2014)
- School uniforms for qualifying public school students. (249 children received uniforms to 30 June 2014)
- School lunches for qualifying public school students for a determined period of time.
- Payment of preschool fees.
- Temporary assistance with payment of utility bills. (over 500 persons/families received assistance to 30 June 2014)
- Medical Travel Expenses Stipend:
- Indigent Insurance Coverage: temporary or indefinite medical coverage from CINICO.
- Burial Assistance towards a funeral package and/or vault.
- Monthly Poor Relief Assistance: Qualifying candidates will be provided with temporary or indefinite relief.

The organisation was criticised by the Auditor General of the Cayman Islands in May 2015 for lack of strategy and management. There is inadequate legislative authority for most of the programmes.
