= Stingray City, Grand Cayman =

Sandbars in the North Sound of Grand Cayman, Cayman Islands

Coordinates: 19.3757°N 81.3048°W

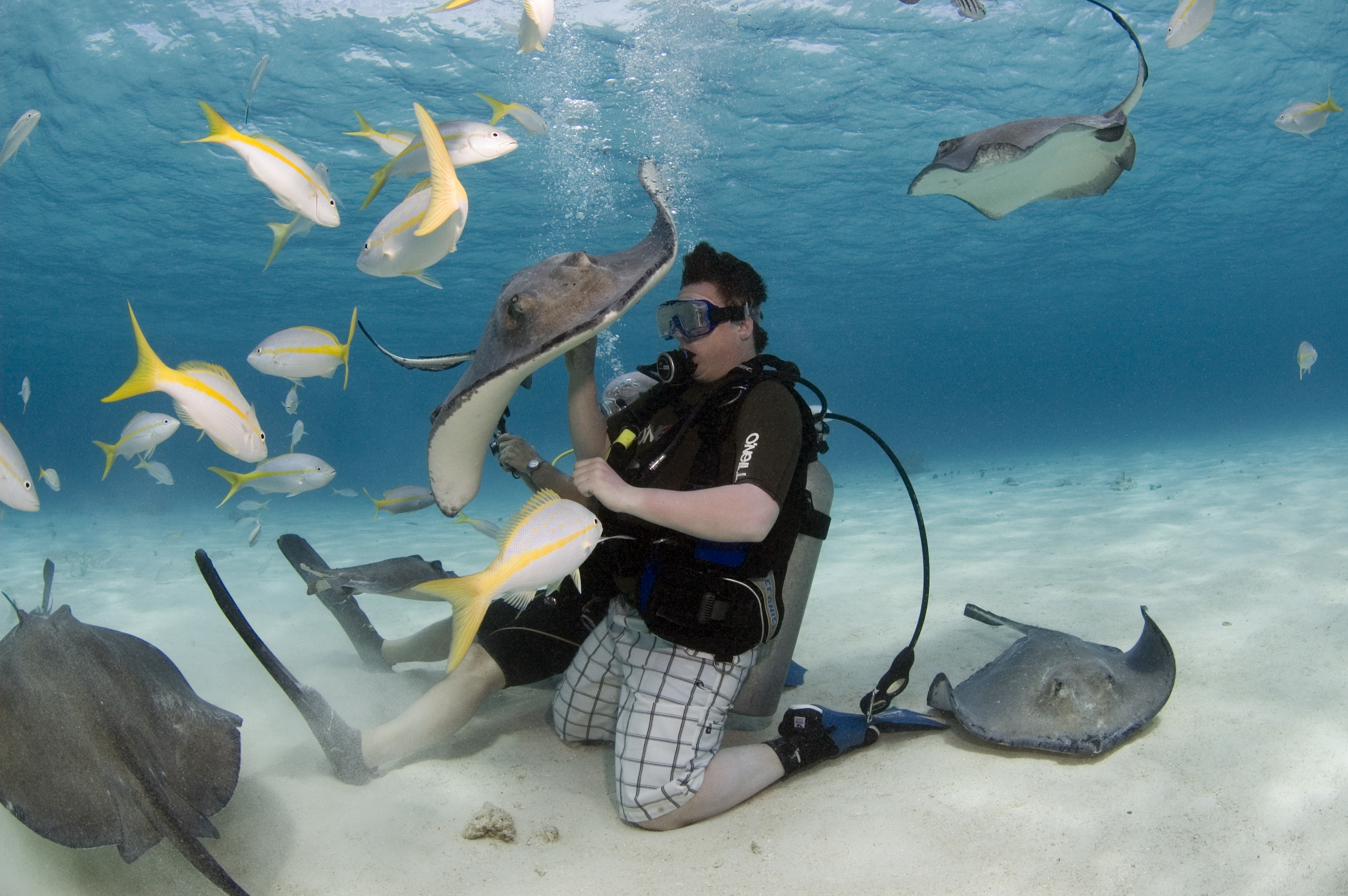
Scuba divers interact with southern stingrays at Stingray City

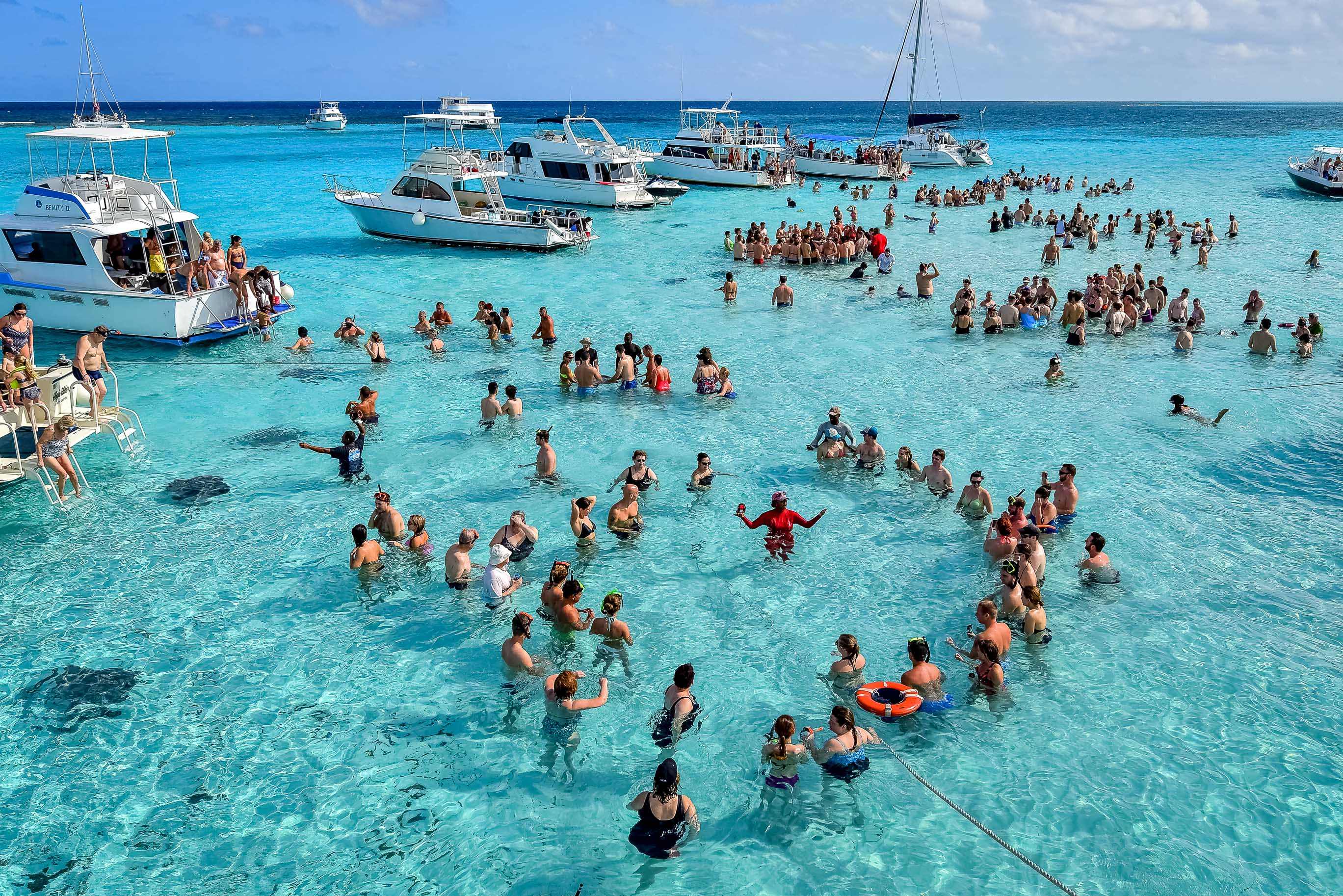
Typical day at Stingray Sandbar

Stingray City is a series of shallow sandbars found in the North Sound of Grand Cayman, Cayman Islands. It is a tourist attraction, where southern stingrays are found in abundance and visitors can pet and interact with the animals.

There are two sandbars, one which is in the shallows and the other one which is deeper and where it is possible to dive with stingrays.

== Location ==
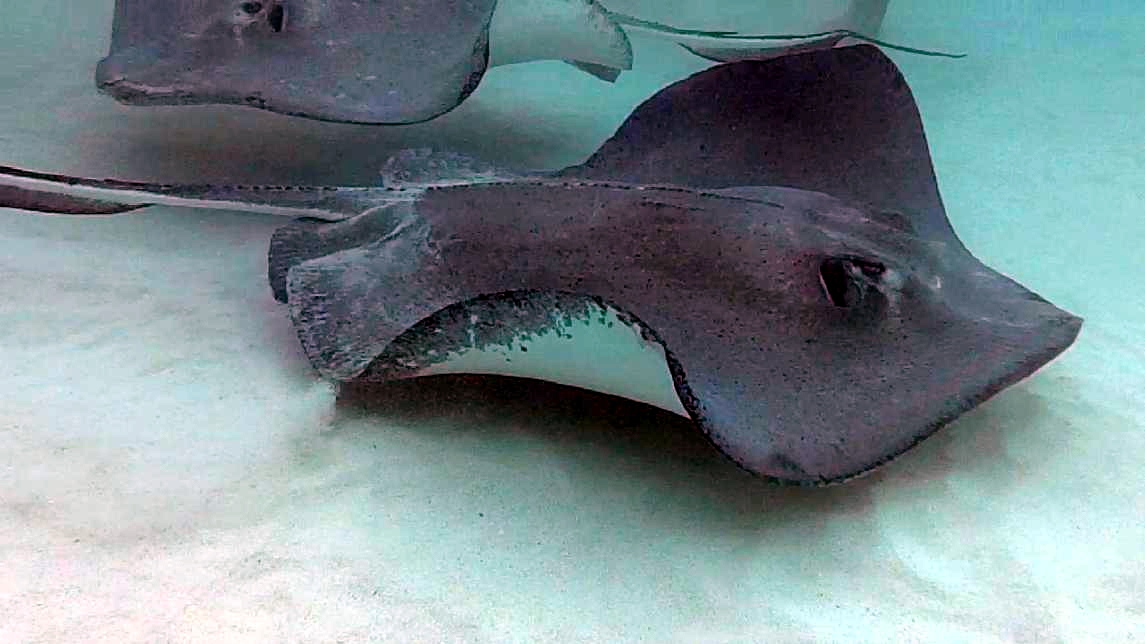
Southern stingrays passing each other at Stingray City Sandbar off of Grand Cayman Island

Stingray City is a shallow sandbar in the northeast region of the Grand Cayman's North Sound. GPS coordinates of Stingray City, Grand Cayman, Cayman Islands. Latitude: 19.3757 Longitude: -81.3048. It is just inside a natural channel that passes through the barrier reef.

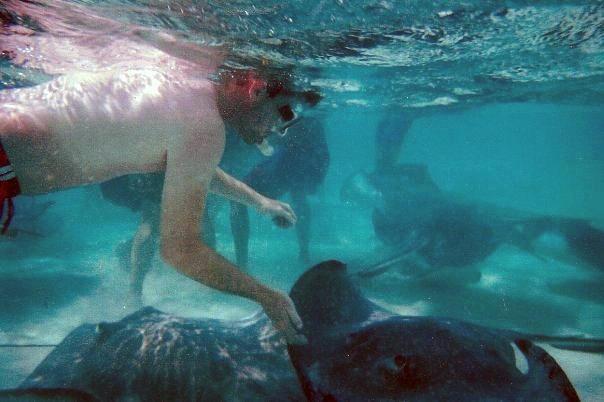
Swimming with the stingrays

== History ==
It may be that stingrays began gathering in the area decades ago when fisherman returning from an excursion, navigated behind a reef into the sound, and cleaned their fish in the calm water of the shallows and sandbar area. The fish guts and squid were thrown overboard and the stingrays eventually congregated to feast there. Soon the stingrays associated the sound of a boat engine with food. As this practice turned into a tradition, divers realized that the stingrays could be fed by hand.

Today, tour and excursion boats, along with private watercraft, gather at Stingray City in large numbers. There is a wide variety of companies that offer Stingray City excursions, which all have their own unique features. Passengers disembark and enter the chest-high water to interact with the stingrays. The boats' proprietors bring along with them pails of chunked-up squid meat, which they dispense by hand to the animals, thus attracting dozens of the creatures to the feeding spot. Visitors can visit Stingray City and pet stingrays, while standing in only 3 feet of water. There are however growing concerns about alterations in behaviour, feeding patterns and general ecology of these rays, when compared to rays not receiving supplemental nutrition.
