= Fabio Gall =

Cayman Islands footballer (born 1993)

Personal information
- Date of birth: 1993 (age 32–33)
- Place of birth: Cayman Islands
- Height: 5 ft 6 in (1.68 m)
- Positions: Full-back; winger

Team information
- Current team: Academy SC

Senior career*
Years	Team	Apps	(Gls)
- Bodden Town FC
- Academy SC

International career
2016	Cayman Islands	1	(0)
- * Club domestic league appearances and goals

Fabio Gall
No. 4
- Position: Quarterback

Personal information
- Born: Cayman Islands

Career history
- Maples Dolphins (2012-)

Fabio Gall is a footballer from the Cayman Islands who plays for Academy SC. He also periodically plays flag football.

== Flag Football ==
Gall plays flag football in the off-season to keep fit in preparation for the Cayman Islands Premier League season. He was the men's Cayman Islands Flag Football League Player of the Week in 2014.

== Personal life ==
Gall's sister, Shenel, is 'the first professional female footballer from the Cayman Islands' and also plays rugby. When they were children, they used to practice together behind their house everyday and had reoccurring disputes about who was the better athlete.

He idolizes Thierry Henry, who stimulated his interest in soccer.
