= The Barefoot Man =

Entertainer and songwriter

- Also known as: The Barefoot Man
- Born: George Nowak
- Origin: German
- Genres: Pop; Beach Rock; Soft rock
- Occupations: Singer, songwriter
- Instrument: Guitar
- Years active: 1970s-present
- Label: Barefoot Records
- Past members: Henry Leslie, Mark McTaggard, Harry Johnson, Philip "Smiley" Bodden
- Website: Official website

The Barefoot Man, born George Nowak, is an entertainer and songwriter who performs primarily in the Cayman Islands, specifically on the largest island of Grand Cayman. He has composed about 2,000 songs and has recorded nearly 500 of them. The Barefoot Man and his Band performed for many years at the now defunct Holiday Inn on the Seven Mile Beach of Grand Cayman. He now performs primarily at the Reef Resort and at The Wharf in Grand Cayman. The Barefoot Man has been commonly compared to other island performers and songwriters like Jimmy Buffett.

Barefoot's songs are predominantly risqué parody, pun and double entendre put to reggae, calypso and sometimes country or pop beats.

The Barefoot Man and Band was featured in the 1993 film, The Firm, starring actors Tom Cruise and Gene Hackman. For this film, George Nowak wrote the song "Money, Money, Money" which appears on the film's soundtrack. The song was performed and recorded by the band that he performed with at the Holiday Inn on Grand Cayman.

He currently lives in the village of Breakers on the island of Grand Cayman and still performs for tourists several nights per week. He is also a contributing writer for several island publications.

== Early years ==
Nowak was the son of a German merchant seaman who abandoned ship when George was very young. George's mother remarried, this time to an American serviceman and they moved to Wilmington, North Carolina where he attended high school. He graduated in 1968 and immediately moved to Nashville to "...write a country hit...to buy (his) own Island."

Nowak details events from his life, including his early years in the book Which way to the Islands? – a collection of short stories and photos. In this book George reveals that during the Vietnam War (circa 1968), he went by the alias Barefoot Man while living "off the radar" in a club trading work for room and board since he could not procure a work permit with this name.

== Barefoot Man Albums (Released as Records and / or Cassette Tapes) ==
Album name	Year released	Serial No.
The Galleon Beach Hotel Proudly Presents the Barefoot Man	1971	BM-001
Calypso Story – Live at the Galleon	1973	BR-T57380
The Galleon's Barefoot Man Sings for You: Songs from the Cayman Islands	1973?	BM-003
Barefoot and Company	1975	BA-1024
Cayman Memories	1977	BR-1005
Happy Days in the Cayman Islands	1978	BR-1006
Come Scuba Do With Me	1978	BR-1007
Barefoot and Andy	1979?	BR-5704
Dirty Foot	1979	BR-5787
Cayman Holiday	1980	GN-5884
A Decade on an Island	1981	BR-1008
Scuba Do II	1981	BF-5939
Typical Tropical	1982?	BF-6137
Barefoot's Island Favorites	1983?	C-1827
Tropical Beachcomber	1983	BFM-1212
Island Party!	1984	???
Barefoot's Best	1985/86?	BR-1014
Strictly Calypso	1987?	C-1940
Like the Reggae Beat	1988?	C-2036
Caribbean Favorites Vol. II	1989?	C-2220
Best of Calypso	1989?	C-2759
Feelin’ Hot, Hot, Hot	1990?	C-2865
Scuba Do III	1990?	C-3038
Back to the Islands	1990	C-4287
Calypso Collection	1991	C-4927
Strictly Calypso REISSUE	1992?	C-5622
Christmas on an Island	1993?	C-5807
Rum and Calypso	1992	???
Rum & Coconut Water	1994	???
Island Life	1994?	C-7054
Island Fever	1995	C-7933/C-8007
You Jamaican Me Crazy	1996	C-8768
Margarita Daze	1998	C-9469

== Barefoot Man Albums (Released Primarily as CDs) ==
Album name	Year released
Calypso Gold – Best of the Best, Volume 1	1996?
Hot Hot Hot Collection – Best of the Best, Volume 2	1997
Under The Coconut Tree	1998
Barefoot's Best of the Best, Volume 3	1998
We Need a Vacation	1999
Three Coconuts	2000
Dirty Belly Button	2002
Loud Shirts	2003
Just Another Sunset	2003
Gone Coconutz	2005
Best of Scuba Do	2005
In the Bahamas	2006
Time Flies When You're Havin' Rum	2008
Only the Good Stuff	2008
Shoeless Classics, Volume I	2009
Shoeless Classics, Volume II	2009
Thong Gone Wrong	2009
Bahamas Best	2009
Children of the Caribbean	2009
Dirty Foot	2010
Horses on the Beach	2010
One Way Ticket to the Beach	2011
You Had to be There	2012
Sand Dollars	2013
Beach Bummin' Around	2014
Why Didn't I Think of That?	2016
Best Ever CD from the Cayman Islands	???
Beyond the Reef	???
The Ballad of Richard Le Noir (Big Black Dick) and More Fun Rummy Calypso's	???
Calypso Classics	???
Fake Boobs and Belly Buttons	???
Hot, Hot, Hot	???
Loud Shirts and Coconuts	???
Reggae 'n Rum	???
