= Gladwyn Bush =

Caymanian female painter (1914–2003)

Gladwyn Bush MBE
- Born: 14 March 1914; George Town, Cayman Islands
- Died: 24 November 2003 (aged 89)
- Resting place: South Sound Community Cemetery, George Town, Cayman Islands
- Spouse: Edward Bloomfield Bush (1909-1989)
- Awards: MBE, Heritage Award (Cayman National Cultural Foundation)

Gladwyn Klosking Bush MBE (14 March 1914 – 24 November 2003), also known as Miss Lassie, was a Caymanian intuitive artist .

== Life and career ==
Gladwyn was born in South Church Street, George Town, Cayman Islands in March 1914 to Richard and Margaret Bush and was one of ten children. As an intuitive artists, Miss Lassie creates from a deep spiritual understanding. Her visions compelled her to create as a form of praise - a visual form that celebrates the possibility of art as a divine language.

During her life, she was not oblivious to those who declared her a madwoman, but instead took some pride in the matter. Henry Mutoo, one of her biggest supporters even stated “reputation that she had was like a lot of older people – if you get on her wrong side she would curse you. So this is why perhaps she had this reputation of being a madwoman.”

== Paintings ==
Bush began painting aged 62 after an experience she described as "visionary". She was inspired to produce artwork after having multiple visions in her sleep of Jesus visiting her and the island. Her work is a mixture of religious themes and documentation of events that had happened on island. For example, one of her works records a large tidal wave which had struck the island in 1932. She painted mainly in oil on canvas. She also decorated the walls and furnishings of her home with her work.

Her "visionary" art style also served as inspiration for other artists who have also experienced similar visions. As a Christian with strongly-held beliefs, Miss Lassie infused her artwork with Christian themes that runthrough many of her artwork pieces. The site where her duplex is located was historically important for ship-building in the Cayman Islands, so her paintings also reflect the local heritage of the location. ‘It is I be not afraid’ is an example of a painting that manages to marry the two themes, depicting an image of God telling fishermen caught at sea not to worry as he would protect them.

== Awards ==
In 1997, Bush was appointed to the Order of the British Empire (MBE) in the Queen's Birthday Honours List "for services to art in the Cayman Islands". She was also awarded the Heritage Award of the Cayman National Cultural Foundation. The foundation also published a book of her paintings, My Markings...the Art of Gladwyn K. Bush, and she has been profiled in numerous books of outsider art. Her paintings are in private collections worldwide, and may also be seen at the American Visionary Art Museum in Baltimore, Maryland.

== House ==
The largest canvas Miss Lassie found however was her own cottage, and this compulsion to paint led her to ‘mark’ her windows, shutters, walls, and doors of her home. Intuitive artists are also identified by creating with materials available in their environments. Miss Lassie utilized what she had, first using house paint, but was also later introduced to canvas and traditional art supplies by friends and others in the community. Following her death in 2003, possession of Gladwyn's home was given to her son Richard. He died shortly after and the interior was destroyed by Hurricane Ivan in 2004. The land was then purchased in 2008 by and preserved by the Cayman National Cultural Foundation. Since April 2011, it has been open as a museum. To this day, Miss Lassies house is still preserved at the Minds Eye centre and is available for walk-through tours and is also available for school-led tours by appointment.
