= White Caymanians =

Ethnic group in the Cayman Islands

Total population
- est. 17,450 (2022); 21.4% of the Cayman Islands population

Regions with significant populations
- George Town, West Bay, Savannah

Languages
- English; Cayman Islands English; Jamaican Patois

Religion
- Primarily Christianity, Judaism

Related ethnic groups
- English, Portuguese, Irish, Scottish, French, Spanish, European Canadians, European Americans, European South Africans, European Jamaicans White Caribbeans

White Caymanians refers to citizens of the Cayman Islands with European ancestry. This may also refer to immigrants, primarily from Europe, and those of European descent from Jamaica, Canada, the United States and South Africa who have obtained Caymanian citizenship, becoming a first generation Caymanian. White Caymanians constitute 21.4% of the Cayman Islands population, which is the third largest ethnic group in the territory. Many will trace their ancestry back to early English and Scottish settlers.

Since the 1700s, European immigrants from the United Kingdom, France, Spain and Portugal have settled in the Cayman Islands. Spanish refugees from the Spanish Inquisition have also settled in the Cayman Islands, as well as deserters from Oliver Cromwell’s army.

== History ==
Christopher Columbus sighted the Cayman Islands in May 1503. Due to swamp and marshland, the unbearable abundance of mosquitoes, and the lack of arable land, the islands were left uninhabited for quite some time. The first recorded settlements dated from 1661 onward, with many families, notably with the surname “Bodden” settling permanently. It is assumed these were European soldiers who deserted from Oliver Cromwell’s army in Jamaica and fled on boat with their families to the Cayman Islands.

The first census of the islands took place in 1802, showing a population of only 933, of which 545 were slaves and 388 were European (mainly English and Scottish) slave owners. Following the abolition of slavery in 1833, Caymanian society seemed to compliantly integrate. The Cayman Islands never had racially discriminatory laws post-abolition, and unlike other jurisdictions that had slavery, the small size and tight-knit community of the Cayman Islands was more inclined to racially integrate to maintain public order, as well as social and economic resilience for the future. With black and white communities mixing, this resulted in a majority mixed race population. During the late 20th century, as the Cayman Islands’ economy boomed, immigration to the islands increased heavily, with many being of European ancestry from countries such as the United States, Canada and the United Kingdom. A substantial number started families with Caymanians and settled in the islands permanently, as well as others staying long enough to obtain citizenship.
