= Cayman 27 =

Television station in the Cayman Islands

- Broadcast area: Cayman Islands

Ownership
- Owner: Hurley's TV

History
- Founded: 1992; 33 years ago
- Launched: 1992; 33 years ago
- Closed: 29 August 2019; 6 years ago

Cayman 27 was a terrestrial television channel in the Cayman Islands. It was owned for a long time by cable operator WestStar before being sold to Hurley's TV.

== History ==
Cayman 27 started broadcasting in 1992 on UHF channel 27 (where it got its later name) by initiative of WestStar Communications as CITN - the Cayman International Television Network. The first broadcasts consisted of a succession of test patterns ahead of its regular start. Among the notable events carried by CITN was a prison riot for two days in October 1999.

By 2010, CITN was operating two channels, Cayman 27 and Island 24. Cayman 27 adopted the tagline Cayman Informed in October 2010. Cayman 27 was converted to high-definition in October 2011. Island 24, under the tagline Cayman Entertained, shut down in November 2011, being replaced by a weather service, Cayman Weather 24/7; some of its output moved to Cayman 27. CITN was also the licensee of CBS, namely its affiliate WSEE-TV, widely available on cable in the Caribbean. In 2013, Logic, WestStar TV's competitor, blocked WSEE from its line-up due to supposed illegal retransmission practices. Cayman 27 was acquired by Logic Communications in 2014, then in 2015 by Hurley's TV, Ltd.

On August 27, 2019, Randy Merren, owner of the channel, announced that it would shut down on August 29 due to a must-carry law that was never properly implemented, as well as unpaid fees worth $103,619.71 from the local regulator OfReg. The channel was never profitable from the beginning, partly due to the small size of the Caymanian market, and decided to shut down ahead of the September 1 date imposed by OfReg, otherwise its operational rights would be suspended. The channel closed on August 29, 2019, after the final edition of the 6pm news, the flagship program.
