= Caymanians =

Citizens of Cayman Islands and their descendants

- Flag of the Cayman Islands

Total population
- c. 88,833

Regions with significant populations
- Cayman Islands
- United Kingdom: 3,000+
- United States: 1,000+
- Canada: 800+
- Jamaica: 90+

Religion
- Primarily Christianity

Caymanians are the status holders or born citizens of the Cayman Islands. As a British Overseas Territory, citizens of the Cayman Islands will hold British Overseas Territories Citizenship. There is no record of a native people to the Cayman Islands, such as groups like the Arawak or Carib people who were native to most of the Caribbean; therefore most Caymanians today are of mixed European and African descent, coming from early British settlers and enslaved people from Africa.

Since 21 May 2002, citizens of all the British Overseas Territories became British citizens under a new UK law, granting the people of every BOT, including the Cayman Islands, the right to live, study and work in the UK as a full citizen, as well as receive the same benefits given to British citizens in the UK.

== Ethnicities ==
Ethnic groups of the Cayman Islands
Ethnic groups	percent
Mixed	39%
Black	24%
White	22%
South Asian	11%
Other	4%

Most Caymanians are of mixed European and African ancestry. Although slavery occurred in the Cayman Islands, it was not as common in comparison to the rest of the Caribbean, therefore, when it was abolished, European and African residents seemed to integrate faster than other nations, resulting in a more mixed race population. There are also prominent black and white populations, with a sizable South Asian population, mainly made up of immigrants from India and the Philippines.

== Languages ==
Languages spoken at home
Languages	percent
English	76.3%
Spanish	10.5%
Tagalog	9.0%
Hindi	3.0%
Other	1.2%

English is the official language of the Cayman Islands. A large number of the population also converse in Spanish, as there are many mixed Caymanian families of Latin American origin. Tagalog is also spoken by Filipino-Caymanians and Filipino immigrants.

== Religion ==
Most Caymanians identify as Christians (66.9%), with 25% belonging to no religion. There are also small numbers of Hindus (1.7%), Muslims (0.4%), Rastafarians (0.3%) and those of Jewish faith (0.2%). 5.5% have not specified.

== Diaspora ==
The Caymanian diaspora population is roughly around 4,000, although the true number is not securely documented. Most Caymanians overseas live in the United Kingdom, which would be due to the convenience of being British Overseas Territories citizens; along with many residing in the United States and Canada. It is common for many young Caymanians to travel to these countries for further education. A small number also reside in Jamaica. With its close proximity to the islands, many Caymanian families are of Jamaican origin or have Jamaican family members.
