= Cayman Islands Civil Service College =

- Established: 2007
- Location: George Town, Cayman Islands
- Website: http://www.csc.gov.ky

The Cayman Islands Civil Service College (CICSC) is a school of higher education in the Cayman Islands. It was established in the Fall of 2007 to further New Public Management reforms as well as the learning and development needs of the Cayman Islands Civil Service and to carry out research within the Caribbean region.

The CICSC currently offers a Certificate in Public Administration, Associate Degree in Public Administration through the auspices of the University College of the Cayman Islands. The CICSC has formulated e-learning capacities for continuing education, specialty training, and support of competency-based human resource initiatives.

== Founding ==
The CICSC was founded in 2007 as one element of the continuing reform programme implemented over the last several years in the Cayman Islands Civil Service. The practical model of the Cayman reform program was New Zealand.

The college also has a regional focus meant to assist and partner with other governments in their efforts to implement pragmatic implementation of good governance reforms.

To date (March 2012), the CICSC has directly served nearly 1,000 Cayman Islands Civil Servants, offering classes in over 150 sections and 50 different areas.

In October 2009, the Associate in Public Administration degree offered through the University College of the Cayman Islands was formalized. The first graduating class was celebrated in December 2011.

In March 2012, the CICSC introduced a Certificate in Public Administration Degree in partnership with the University College of the Cayman Islands.
