= John Reno Jackson =

British artist

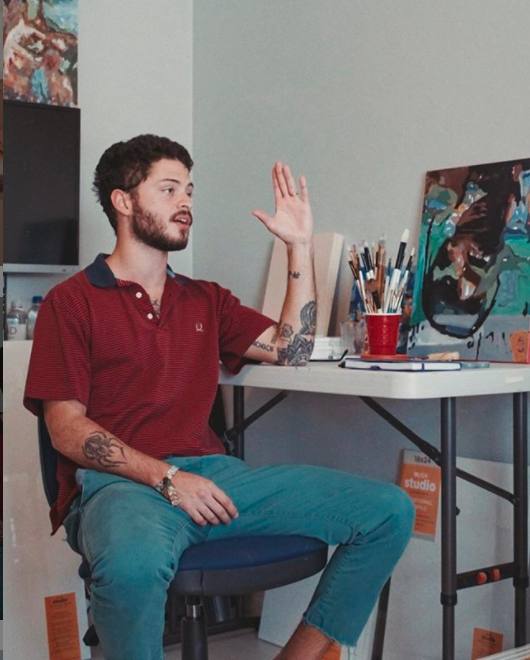
- artist, during 2019 interview
- Born: Jonathan Reno Jackson; October 31, 1995 (age 30); George Town, Grand Cayman, Cayman Islands
- Known for: Painting, Photography, Performance art, Sculpture

John Reno Jackson (born October 31, 1995) is a British (Caymanian) interdisciplinary artist, known for his continued exploration with multimedia through a series of works made interpreting themes such as migration, isolation and identity. His works interlace ideas in multiple narratives drawn from current and historical situations within the Cayman Islands and the Caribbean region.

== Early life and education ==
John Reno Jackson was born in George Town, Cayman Islands in 1995. His father from Cayman Brac and his mother from Texas, Jackson spent his younger years primarily in the Cayman Islands, and at times south Texas and Europe, developing his technique and exploring concepts around identity. Jackson attended foundation courses in painting and drawing at the Art Academy London in 2015. Upon his return to Cayman, Jackson continued evolving his practice through residencies and educational programs. In 2020, Jackson was accepted into the TURPS Correspondence Course. An art school programme by TURPS Banana aimed towards painters who want to develop or invigorate their work through mentorship.

== Art career ==
John Reno Jackson has used multiple different materials and methods to create his work: from traditional Caymanian craft materials such as Silver Thatch rope to found objects such as fabrics, dirt, or old televisions.

In his formative years, he said he found the size of Cayman limiting, but with time he has come to appreciate what the small community has to offer. Jackson's inspirations come from social hierarchies, political arguments, the flickering neon light at a bar late at night, the patterns of traditional quilts, and the love and fruit cake of an elderly relative. All the things around us impact the way we see the world and the art in our lives must speak to these things, whether indirectly or adamantly.

His exhibitions include the Winter Showcase at the Art Academy London in 2015, at Paulo – PADA Studios in Barreiro, Portugal, where he attended an artist’s residency in 2020, and at Artisan Space in London, UK (2020). His work was featured in the exhibition, Island of Women: Life at Home in our Maritime Years, at National Gallery of the Cayman Islands in 2020 and the 2nd Cayman Islands Biennial: Reimagined Futures in 2021.

In 2021, Jackson participated in Cayman Art Week, a week-long programme to celebrate and encourage the collection of Caymanian art. He exhibited two works in the Little Cayman Museum as an extension to his works showcased in the 2nd Cayman Islands Biennial.

While best known for large-scale abstract paintings, Jackson continues to explore and develop work that is based around: compositions that deal with digital collage, the process and manipulation of film-photography based portraits, abstracting photo imagery through form/colour coordination and collage, the presentation, placement, and atmosphere of artwork, and the incorporation and identification of found materials. His paintings, that can act as both figures and landscapes, reflect on developing a narrative around fables, social interaction, adolescence, race, and sexual identity.

== Collections ==
John Reno Jackson's works are held in private collections across the Cayman Islands, Canada, USA, UK, Netherlands, Israel, and Portugal. Jackson has also been commissioned by multiple hotels in the Cayman Islands such as Palm Heights and The Ritz-Carlton.

In late 2019, three of Jackson's works were added to the permanent collection of the National Gallery of the Cayman Islands. An additional work, 'The Soul Who Raised Us' was acquired by the National Gallery of the Cayman Islands in 2020.

== Grants and awards ==
- One of 100 Caribbean artists selected and the first Caymanian to receive a grant from Catapult & Fresh Milk Barbados, AFJ, and Kingston Creative. The programme targets individuals exploring the critical key themes of culture, human rights, gender, LGBTQIA+ and climate justice which are so relevant to the region.
- Awarded a Certificate of Commendation by the National Gallery of the Cayman Islands for his work in the 2021, 2nd Cayman Islands Biennial: Reimagined Futures.
