= Layman E. Scott Sr. High School =

Layman. E. Scott Sr. High School

Location
- 941 A Dennis Foster Road; Cayman Brac KY2-2101; Cayman Islands
- Coordinates: 19.7277°N 79.8108°W

Information
- Motto: "Whatever your hand finds to do, do it with all your might." (Ecclesiastes 9:10)
- Established: 1967
- Status: Active
- Authority: Cayman Islands Education Department
- Administrator: JDB
- Principal: Kevin A. Roberts
- Grades: 7-12
- Average class size: 18
- National ranking: 1st among Cayman Islands Government schools
- Website: des.edu.ky/Layman.cfm

Layman E. Scott Sr. High School (formerly known as Cayman Brac Secondary Modern School and Cayman Brac High School) is a secondary school located in Cayman Brac, Cayman Islands. It is the only secondary school on Cayman Brac.

The school was officially opened on 23 January 1967 as Cayman Brac Secondary Modern School with 73 students and 4 staff members, under the leadership of then-principal Layman E. Scott Sr.

The school name was changed from Cayman Brac High School to Layman E. Scott Sr. High School on 20 April 2011 in honour of Layman E. Scott Sr. who served as the first principal of the school. Scott died on 25 December 2010.
