= Edison Mclean =

Edison McLean (born September 11, 1969) is a male skeet shooting athlete from the Cayman Islands.

== Olympic skeet achievements ==
- 2011 NatWest Island Games – first Caymanian gold medalist in Olympic skeet.
