= North Side, Cayman Islands =

North Side
- Location within Cayman Islands
- Coordinates: 19.352105°N 81.208405°W
- Country: United Kingdom
- Overseas Territory: Cayman Islands
- Island: Grand Cayman

Population (2021)
  - Total: 1,902

North Side is a town and district in the Cayman Islands. Located on the northern coast of Grand Cayman, in 2021 it had a population of 1,902.

There is a primary school and high school in the district, as well as an association football team called the North Side FC.
