= Cayman National Cultural Foundation =

The Cayman National Cultural Foundation (CNCF) is the official arts council for the Cayman Islands. It was founded in 1984.

The Cayman National Cultural Foundation manages the F.J. Harquail Cultural Centre and the US$4 million Harquail Theatre.
