= List of isolated islands and archipelagos =

This is a list of the most isolated islands and archipelagos on Earth in terms of distance to another landmass. Many of these islands are of volcanic origin via tectonic plates such as Bouvet Island while others appear from hotspots such as the Azores which was created by the Azores hotspot. This list includes islands that are more than 500 kilometres (310 mi) away from another point of land.

== Notable omissions ==
One such omission on this list is Tristan da Cunha. While it is usually regarded as one of the most remote islands on Earth the island is actually only 320 kilometres (200 mi) from Gough Island, which is uninhabited apart from a weather station with around 6–7 people on it but they are not a permanent population.

Easter Island is another omission. The island is 320 kilometres (200 mi) from Isla Salas y Gómez.

Other islands and archipelagos include the Chagos Archipelago being 475 kilometres (295 mi) away from the Maldives, the Kerguelen Islands and the Heard Island and McDonald Islands are about 480 kilometers away from each other. Other fairly remote islands include Ducie Island, South Orkney Islands, Peter I Island, Malpelo Island, Conway Reef and Palmerston Island. The New Zealand Subantarctic Islands are relatively close to each other.

== List ==
Island / Archipelago	Distance to nearest landmass	Closest point	Notes / Refs
Bouvet Island	1,639 kilometres (1,018 mi)	(Antarctica) Queen Maud Land	The island is a territory of Norway.
Trindade and Martim Vaz	1,167 kilometres (725 mi)	Brazil	
Ascension Island	1,100 kilometres (680 mi)	Saint Helena	The island is administratively part of Saint Helena, Ascension and Tristan da Cunha, a territory in the United Kingdom.
Saint Helena	1,100 kilometres (680 mi)	Ascension Island	The island is administratively part of Saint Helena, Ascension and Tristan da Cunha, a territory in the United Kingdom.
Bermuda	1,050 kilometres (650 mi)	(United States) North Carolina	The island is a territory of the United Kingdom.
Crozet Islands	1,050 kilometres (650 mi)	(South Africa) Prince Edward Islands	
Prince Edward Islands	1,050 kilometres (650 mi)	(French Southern and Antarctic Lands) Crozet Islands	
Minamitorishima	1,015 kilometres (631 mi)	Northern Mariana Islands	
Kermadec Islands	1,000 kilometres (620 mi)	New Zealand	
Clipperton Island	945 kilometres (587 mi)	(Mexico) Revillagigedo Islands	
Cocos (Keeling) Islands	900 kilometres (560 mi)	Christmas Island	
Johnston Atoll	890 kilometres (550 mi)	(United States) Hawaii	
Azores	850 kilometres (530 mi)	Madeira	
Desventuradas Islands	818 kilometres (508 mi)	(Chile) Juan Fernández Islands	
Galápagos Islands	720 kilometres (450 mi)	(Costa Rica) Cocos Island	
South Sandwich Islands	700 kilometres (430 mi)	South Georgia and the South Sandwich Islands	
South Georgia	700 kilometres (430 mi)	(South Georgia and the South Sandwich Islands) South Sandwich Islands	
Chatham Islands	650 kilometres (400 mi)	New Zealand	
Juan Fernández Islands	650 kilometres (400 mi)	Chile	
Macquarie Island	650 kilometres (400 mi)	Auckland Islands	
Saint Peter and Saint Paul Archipelago	625 kilometres (388 mi)	(Brazil) Fernando de Noronha	
Wake Island	580 kilometres (360 mi)	(Marshall Islands) Bokak Atoll	
Rodrigues	560 kilometres (350 mi)	Mauritius	Distance to main island.
Bass Islands	550 kilometres (340 mi)	(French Polynesia) Raivavae	
Cocos Island	550 kilometres (340 mi)	Costa Rica	
Okinotorishima	534 kilometres (332 mi)	(Japan) Okidaitōjima	
Scott Island	505 kilometres (314 mi)	(Antarctica) Victoria Land	Due to the Antarctic Treaty, any landmass south of 60°S are not part of any country.
Jan Mayen	500 kilometres (310 mi)	(Iceland) Kolbeinsey	
Marquesas Islands	500 kilometres (310 mi)	(French Polynesia) Tuamotus	
