= Ministry of Education, Employment and Gender Affairs =

Ministry of the Cayman Islands

The Ministry of Education, Employment and Gender Affairs is a ministry of the Cayman Islands. It is headquartered on the fifth floor of the Government Administration Building in George Town, Grand Cayman, Cayman Islands.

The Cayman Islands Department of Education Services (DES) operates public schools on the island. It is headquartered in a separate building in George Town.
