= East End, Cayman Islands =

East End
- Location within Cayman Islands
- Coordinates: 19.297494°N 81.109486°W
- Country: United Kingdom
- Overseas Territory: Cayman Islands
- Island: Grand Cayman

Population (2021)
  - Total: 1,846
- Time zone: UTC-05:00 (EST)

East End is a town and one of the five districts of the Cayman Islands. Located on south-east coast of Grand Cayman, in 2021 it had a population of 1,846.
