= List of airlines of the United Kingdom =

The following is a list of operational airlines in the United Kingdom. Two airlines based in the Channel Islands are also given at the end of the article. For British Overseas Territories, see the articles for Anguilla, Bermuda, British Virgin Islands, Cayman Islands, Falkland Islands, Montserrat, and Turks and Caicos Islands.

== Scheduled airlines ==
Type A Operating Licence holders
| Airline | Image | IATA | ICAO | Callsign | Remarks |
|---|---|---|---|---|---|
| British Airways | | BA | BAW / SHT | SPEEDBIRD / SHUTTLE | The flag carrier, with its hubs at Heathrow and Gatwick airports. It flies to 245 destinations all around the world, with a fleet of Airbus and Boeing aircraft. It is the second largest UK carrier behind easyJet. |
| BA CityFlyer | | CJ | CFE | FLYER | Regional airline, flying Embraer aircraft, it is a subsidiary of British Airways (BA). Its head office is at Didsbury, Manchester, England; the airline operates all flights from its hub at London City Airport to UK and European destinations with the BA's full livery and flight numbers. |
| BA EuroFlyer | | A0 | EFW | GRIFFIN | Subsidiary of British Airways (BA), operating flights from its hub at London Gatwick to short haul destinations with BA's full livery and flight numbers. |
| easyJet | | U2 | EZY | EASY | Low-cost carrier with its main hub at Luton Airport. It operates domestic and international scheduled services on 1,000 routes to 30 countries via its affiliate airlines, operating only Airbus aircraft. |
| Jet2.com | | LS | EXS | CHANNEX | Low-cost-leisure airline offering scheduled and charter flights from the country. With a fleet of Airbus and Boeing aircraft, it is the third largest airline in the UK, after easyJet and British Airways. Jet2 acts as the in-house airline for Jet2's package holidays. |
| Loganair | | LM | LOG | LOGAN | Scottish regional airline with its base at Glasgow Airport near Paisley, Scotland. It is the largest regional airline in the UK. |
| Norse Atlantic UK | | Z0 | UBT | LONGBOAT | Low-cost carrier Long-haul; a subsidiary of Norse Atlantic Airways, its base at Gatwick Airport. |
| Ryanair UK | | RK | RUK | BLUE MAX | Low-cost carrier, a subsidiary of Ryanair, its base at London Stansted Airport. |
| Virgin Atlantic | | VS | VIR | VIRGIN | Long haul airline based in Crawley, England. |
| Wizz Air UK | | W9 | WUK | WIZZ GO | Low-cost carrier, a subsidiary of Wizz Air, with its base at Luton Airport. |

== Charter airlines ==
Type A Operating Licence holders
| Airline | Image | IATA | ICAO | Callsign | Remarks |
|---|---|---|---|---|---|
| 2Excel Aviation | | | BRO | BROADSWORD | Contract airline operating small fixed-wing aircraft for HM Coastguard |
| AirTanker | | 9L | TOW | TOWLINE | Operates a fleet of 14 Airbus A330 MRTT for the Royal Air Force, known as Voyager, under a 27-year contract to the UK Government. Its call sign is a nod to its primary role of aerial refuelling tankers. |
| BAE Systems Corporate Air Travel / Marine | | | MOG / VSB | FELIX / VICKERS | |
| Bristow Helicopters | | | BHL | BRISTOW | |
| SaxonAir | | | SXN | SAXONAIR | |
| RVL Aviation | | 7M | REV | ENDURANCE | |
| TAG Aviation (UK) | | | VIP | SOVEREIGN | |
| TUI Airways | | BY | TOM | TOMJET | Largest charter airline in Europe. British-registered airline owned by the TUI Group, and in-house airline for TUI's UK tour operations. Operates an all-Boeing fleet of over 70 737NG, 737 MAX, and 787 Dreamliner aircraft. Fourth largest airline in the UK, behind Jet2.com. |
| Titan Airways | | ZT | AWC | ZAP | Provides aircraft to the UK Government, executive and corporate clients, and other airlines, such as BA Euroflyer, Jet2.com, and TUI Airways. |

== Cargo airlines ==
Type A Operating Licence holders
| Airline | Image | IATA | ICAO | Callsign | Remarks |
|---|---|---|---|---|---|
| DHL Air UK | | D0 | DHK | WORLD EXPRESS | UK subsidiary of DHL in Germany. Main base at East Midlands Airport. |
| One Air | | HC | HGO | HAMPTON | |
| West Atlantic UK | | NL | NPT | NEPTUNE | |

== Helicopter operators / general aviation ==
Type B Operating Licence holders
| Airline | Image | IATA | ICAO | Callsign | Remarks |
|---|---|---|---|---|---|
| Acropolis Aviation | | | CRV | ACROPOLIS | |
| Air Charter Scotland | | | EDC | SALTIRE | Its call sign is a homage to the flag of Scotland. |
| Babcock Mission Critical Services Offshore | | | ULR | VIPER | Originally known as Bond Helicopters. |
| Babcock Mission Critical Services Onshore | | | RHD | REDHEAD | |
| DEA Aviation Limited | | | WKT | WHITE KNIGHT | |
| Directflight | | | DCT | AIRTASK | |
| Flexjet Operations Limited | | | FLJ | FLEX AIR | Subsidiary of Flexjet LLC |
| Gama Aviation | | | GMA | GAMA | |
| Hebridean Air Services | | | HBR | HEBRIDEAN | |
| Isles of Scilly Skybus | | | IOS | SCILLONIA | |
| London Executive Aviation | | | LNX | LONEX | |
| LyddAir | | | LYD | LYDDAIR | |

== Channel Islands and the Isle of Man ==
| Airline | Image | IATA | ICAO | Callsign | Remarks |
|---|---|---|---|---|---|
| Aurigny | | GR | AUR | AYLINE | Flag carrier of the Balliwick of Guernsey. Operates a fleet of six ATR 72-600 turboprop aircraft, to various destinations in the UK and northern Europe. |
| Isles of Scilly Skybus | | 5Y | IOS | | |

== See also ==
- Lists of airlines
- List of defunct airlines of the United Kingdom
