= List of airports in the Cayman Islands =

Map of the Cayman Islands

This is a list of airports in the Cayman Islands.

The Cayman Islands are a British overseas territory. The islands lie in the northwest of the Caribbean Sea and are situated about 500 miles (800 km) south of Miami, 180 miles (290 km) south of Cuba, and 195 miles (314 km) northwest of Jamaica. Grand Cayman is the biggest island, with an area of 76 square miles (200 km^{2}). The two "Sister Islands" of Cayman Brac and Little Cayman are located about 80 miles (130 km) east of Grand Cayman and have areas of 14 and 10 square miles (36 and 26 km^{2}) respectively.

== Airports ==
Airport names shown in bold have scheduled passenger service on commercial airlines.

Location served	ICAO	IATA	Airport name	Coordinates
George Town, Grand Cayman	MWCR	GCM	**Owen Roberts International Airport**	19°17′33″N 081°21′33″W
Cayman Brac	MWCB	CYB	**Charles Kirkconnell International Airport**	19°41′13″N 79°52′58″W
Little Cayman	MWCL	LYB	**Edward Bodden Airfield**	19°39′36″N 80°05′20″W

== See also ==
- Transport in the Cayman Islands
- List of airports by ICAO code: M#MW - Cayman Islands
- List of airports in the United Kingdom and the British Crown Dependencies
- Wikipedia: WikiProject Aviation/Airline destination lists: North America#Cayman Islands (United Kingdom)
