= Omega Bay Estates =

Residential estate in the Cayman Islands

Coordinates: 19°17′36″N 81°19′27″W

Omega Bay Estates is a luxury residential estate on the northern central coast of Grand Cayman in the Cayman Islands. Omega Bay Estates lies to the north of Prospect Park and east of the Owen Roberts International Airport and Grand Harbour. The development, with a series of canals, took off in the 1970s, and was negotiated by Abramson in Vancouver, British Columbia, Canada. To the south is the Faith Cathedral Deliverance Centre.
