= List of airlines of the Cayman Islands =

This is a list of airlines operating in The Cayman Islands.

== Active ==
Airline	Image	IATA	ICAO	Callsign	Founded	Notes
Cayman Airways		KX	CAY	CAYMAN	1968	Flag carrier.
Island Air					1987	
Phenix Jet Cayman			CPJ	DRAGON EYE	2017	

== Defunct ==
Airline	Image	IATA	ICAO	Callsign	Founded	Ceased operations	Notes
BlueSky Airlines					2015		Never launched.
Cayman Brac Airways					1955	1968	Renamed to Cayman Airways.

== See also ==
- List of airlines of the Americas
- List of defunct airlines of the Americas
