= List of equipment of the Belgian Air Force =

This page lists the equipment of the Belgian Air Force, the air arm of the Belgian Armed Forces. After the end of the Cold War the Belgian Air Force was combined into the overall Armed Forces and many units were disbanded. As a part of NATO, the Belgian Air Component committed aircraft and participated in the NATO Nuclear Weapon Sharing Program. In 2024 Belgian Air Component was renamed the Belgian Air Force.

== Aeroplanes ==
Model	Variant	Image	Type	Quantity	Notes
Combat aircraft
General Dynamics F-16 Fighting Falcon	F-16AM		4th generation multirole fighter aircraft	44	To be replaced by the F-35A by 2030. Notes: Dutch and Belgian production of parts under licence, assembly by Fokker and SABCA.; 160 F-16A and F16B purchased, 72 went through a MLU.; 30 F-16 to be donated to Ukraine by 2028.
Lockheed Martin F-35 Lightning II	F-35A		Multirole stealth fighter	8	The F-35A is the successor of the F-16AM.: 34 ordered in 2018; Eleven approved for order in 2025 (Italian assembly); Ten additional planned; Eight other based at the Luke AFB for training (listed in "Training aircraft" section of this table).
Transport (and tanker)
Airbus A400M	—		Strategic transport / Tactical airlift / Aerial refueling	7	Based at the Melsbroek Air Base with an additional A400M from the Luxembourg Air Wing. Two A400M are tanker variants with a further two refuelling kits that can be used on any A400M to refuel other aircraft.
Dassault Falcon 7X	—		VIP transport	2	Aircraft leased.
Cessna 408 SkyCourier			SOF Air / Utility	-	5 on order. First deliveries of basic airframe by the end of 2026.
Training aircraft
Lockheed Martin F-35 Lightning II	F-35A		Operational conversion training aircraft	8	Based at the Luke AFB for training. Eight more F-35 listed in the "Combat aircraft" section of this table.
General Dynamics F-16 Fighting Falcon	F-16BM		Operational conversion training aircraft	8	F-16BM is the twin-seater variant of the F-16, used to train pilots. They will be replaced by the F-35A by 2030.
Pilatus PC-7	PC-7 MKX		Basic training aircraft, single engine turboprop	0	Approval to purchase 18 aircraft in November 2025.
SIAI-Marchetti SF.260	—		Ab initio training aircraft, single engine turboprop	19	36 SF.260M/D were purchased in 1969, with some losses since. Aircraft used for basic flight training. The Belgian Air Force was looking for a successor to this aircraft. In November 2025 the PC-7 was ordered as replacement.

== Helicopters ==
Model	Variant	Image	Type	Quantity	Notes
Combat helicopter
NHIndustries NH90	NH90 NFH		SAR / Utility	4	The NH90 NFH is operated by the Belgian Air Force in profit of the Belgian Navy. Purchase approved in April 2007, and it entered service from 2013 to 2015. MLU approved with the plan STAR, it will bring an ASW capability to the helicopter.
AgustaWestland AW109	A109BA		Light utility helicopter	10	A total of 46 A109BA were ordered in 1988, received between 1992 and 1994. Twelve helicopters remain in service. As part of the plan STAR, the A109BA will be replaced by the Airbus H145M.
Airbus H145	H145M	(illustration)	Multirole helicopter	2 (+ 13 on order)	The Airbus H145M is the successor of the NH90 TTH and A109BA. Fifteen helicopters for the Belgian Armed Forces were ordered in June 2024, with delivery to start in 2026.
Airbus H145	H145M	(illustration)	Multirole helicopter / Federal Police	0 (+ 5 on order)	The Belgian government also approved a purchase of five Airbus H145M in November 2025, three of which will be available for both Air Force and Federal Police. The two other were earlier purchased for the Federal Police under the Minister of Interior, but maintenance will also be done by the Air Force.

== Unmanned aerial vehicles ==
Model	Variant	Image	Type	Role	Quantity	Notes
General Atomics MQ-9 Reaper	MQ-9B SkyGuardian		MALE, fixed-wing UCAV Medium-altitude long-endurance	Surveillance and reconnaissance, targeted strikes	3 (+ 1 on order)	2 ground stations for the 4 MQ-9B.

== Aircraft owned externally ==
=== Co-owned aeroplanes ===
The Belgian Air Force participates in some multinational programs to provide some support capabilities that it does not need full-time such as tanker transport aircraft and early-warning capabilities.

Model	Variant	Operators	Image	Origin	Type	Quantity	Notes
Aerial refueling
Airbus A330 MRTT Multi-Role Tanker Transport	A330-200 MRTT	MMF Multinational MRTT Fleet: Belgium; Czech Republic; Denmark; Germany; Luxembourg; Netherlands; Norway; Sweden		European Union	Tanker / Transport aircraft / Medical evacuation	10 (+ 2 on order)	Based at the Eindhoven Air Base in the Netherlands.: Two ordered in July 2016 (first members Netherlands and Luxembourg); Five ordered in September 2018 (Germany and Norway joined the programme); One ordered in February 2018 (Belgium joined the programme); One ordered in September 2020 (Luxembourg increases participation); One ordered in March 2023 (Belgium increases participation); Two ordered in June 2025 (arrival of Sweden and Denmark in the programme); The first aircraft entered service in June 2020, the ninth in February 2025.
Air surveillance
Boeing E-3 Sentry	E-3A	NAEW&CF programme NATO Airborne Early Warning & Control Force: Belgium; Canada; Czech Republic; Denmark; Germany; Greece; Hungary; Italy; Luxembourg; Netherlands; Norway; Poland; Portugal; Romania; Turkey; Spain; United States		United States	AEW&C Airborne early warning and control	14	Based at NATO Air Base Geilenkirchen, Germany. 18 E-3 used initially.

=== Leased aeroplanes ===
Model	Variant	Image	Type	Quantity	Notes
Dassault Falcon 7X	—		VIP transport	2	Aircraft leased.

=== Supplied by a contractor ===
Model	Variant	Image	Type	Quantity	Notes
Airbus H145	—	(illustration)	Training helicopter	3	Training provided by a contractor, NHV (Noordzee Helikopters Vlaanderen).

== Weapons systems ==
The Belgian Air Force has various weapons systems, primarily for the F-16 and F-35, including air-to-air missiles, such as the AIM-9 Sidewinder, and the AIM-120C-8 AMRAAM, guided and unguided bombs as well as guidance kits such as Paveway.

Belgium also ordered Brimstone and Hellfire air-launched ground attack missiles for the Skyguardian drones, as well as Joint Strike Missiles, air-launched cruise missile, for the F-35's.

The Belgian Air Force also stores B61 nuclear bombs at the Kleine Brogel Air Base as part of NATO's nuclear deterrence plans.
