= Edward Bodden Airfield =

Airport in the Cayman Islands

Edward Bodden Airfield Little Cayman Airport
- Bodden Terminal
- IATA: LYB; ICAO: MWCL

Summary
- Airport type: Public
- Location: Little Cayman
- Elevation AMSL: 4 ft (1.2 m)
- Coordinates: 19°39′36″N 80°05′20″W

Map
- Location in the Cayman Islands

Runways
Direction	Length		Surface
Direction	m	ft	Surface
10/28	935	3,068	Asphalt
- Source: Little Cayman AIC July 2010 GCM Google Maps

Edward Bodden Airfield (IATA: LYB, ICAO: MWCL), also known as Little Cayman Airport, is an airfield on the southwest side of Little Cayman, one of the Cayman Islands.

The runway parallels the south shoreline, and approach and departures are over the water. Runway length includes a 180 metres (590 ft) displaced threshold on Runway 28.

The Cayman Brac non-directional beacon was located 13.2 nautical miles (24.4 km) east of the airport, on Cayman Brac island, but was decommissioned in 2021 and replaced with the BRACC airway intersection.

Little Cayman Airport's other main building, a 75-foot (23-metre) free span airplane hangar located directly across the field from Bodden Terminal, was built in 1970.

The airport has an exemption of airworthiness from the Civil Aviation Authority of the Cayman Islands, however, as of June 2025, the exemption would not continue unless the airport adheres to current standards.

== Airlines and destinations ==
Airlines	Destinations
Cayman Airways Express	Cayman Brac, Grand Cayman

Cayman Airways Express serves the airport with de Havilland Canada DHC-6 Twin Otter commuter twin turboprop aircraft, which have STOL capability.

== See also ==
- Transport in the Cayman Islands
- List of airports in the Cayman Islands
