= Caymanite =

Variety of dolomite

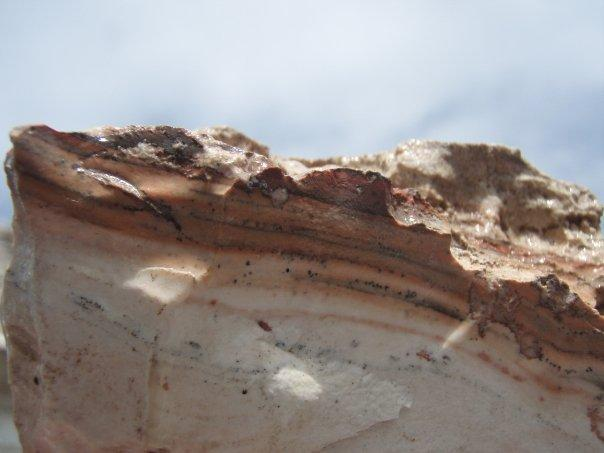
- Caymanite from Cayman Brac, Cayman Islands

General
- Category: Carbonate minerals
- Formula: CaMg(CO_{3})_{2}

Identification
- Color: white to red and black
- Solubility: Poorly soluble in dilute HCl

Caymanite at its type area is an uncommon variety of dolomite, also known as dolostone, originally reported from locations in the Miocene Cayman Formation in the Cayman Islands: the Bluff in Cayman Brac and the East End on Grand Cayman.

== Geology ==
Away from the type area, material now being called "caymanite" is not an "uncommon variety of dolostone" as it is sensu stricto at the type area. It has been reported from the Buda Hills of Hungary. Caymanite occurs as a fine grained or vug filling variety of the mineral dolomite CaMg(CO_{3})_{2}. It occurs as white to red and black filling in fossil molds, small cavities and caves. It is used as a semi-precious stone. In New South Wales, Australia, pockets of later-deposited beds (usually reddish) are widespread in the Silurian-Devonian limestones. These are thus far reported only from the Lachlan Fold Belt portion of the Tasman Orogenic Zone. They are mostly small pockets but occasionally reach up to several metres wide. These had been long known about and began to be referred to as Caymanite by Dr. Armstrong Osborne who also worked up and published the finding that the Jenolan cave complex is world's oldest known and dated open cave system. The best description so far of the New South Wales caymanite is from Jenolan Caves. None of the NSW material is silicified or in any way suitable for use as a semi-precious stone.

== Formation ==
The formation of caymanite followed two phases. The first phase of caymanite formation occurred after deposition, lithification, and karst process of the Oligocene Cayman Member. The second phase of caymanite formation occurred after joints had developed in the Middle Miocene Pedro Castle Member. Caymanite deposition predated dolomitization, a process where limestone is altered from contact with magnesium-rich water. Then the magnesium carbonate replaces the calcite naturally in the rock without complete destruction of the original sedimentary fabrics or structures. Dolomitization in the Bluff Formations of Cayman Brac occurred 2-5 million years ago.

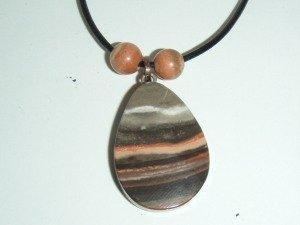
Caymanite jewelry from a display by the National Museum of the Cayman Islands
