= Island Air =

Island Air may refer to:

- Island Air (Hawaii), a former commuter airline in Hawaii, US
- Island Air (Cayman Islands)
- Island Airlines, an air shuttle between Nantucket and mainland Cape Cod as well as additional service in the northeast US
- Island Airways, an air shuttle between Charlevoix and Beaver Island, Michigan, US
