= Charles Kirkconnell International Airport =

Airport in Cayman Brac, Cayman Islands

Sir Charles Kirkconnell International Airport
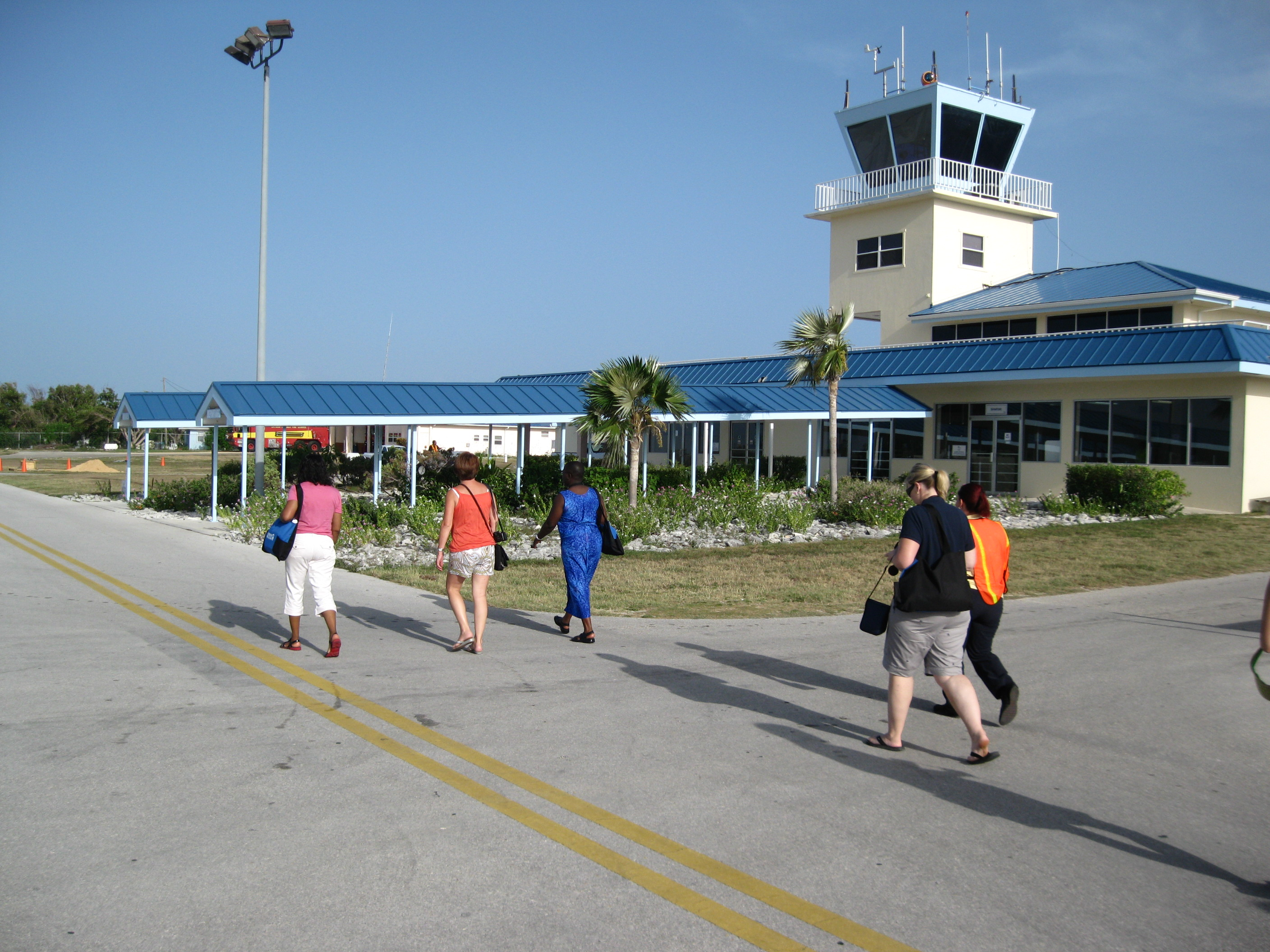
- IATA: CYB; ICAO: MWCB

Summary
- Airport type: Public
- Location: Cayman Brac
- Elevation AMSL: 8 ft (2.4 m)
- Coordinates: 19°41′13″N 79°52′58″W
- Website: caymanairports.com

Map
- Location in the Cayman Islands CYB (the Caribbean)

Runways
Direction	Length		Surface
Direction	m	ft	Surface
09/27	1,848	6,063	Asphalt
- Sources: Cayman Islands AIP GCM Google Maps

Sir Captain Charles Kirkconnell International Airport (IATA: CYB, ICAO: MWCB) is an airport serving Cayman Brac, Cayman Islands. It is one of the hubs for Cayman Airways with flights to Owen Roberts International Airport on Grand Cayman, and Edward Bodden Airfield on Little Cayman. It is the only airport on Cayman Brac.

The runway is on the southwestern end of Cayman Brac, and parallels the south shoreline. Approaches and departures are over the water. The Cayman Brac non-directional beacon (Ident: CBC) is located 1.0 nautical mile (1.9 km) off the approach threshold of Runway 27.

In 2012, the airport was renamed Charles Kirkconnell International Airport, in memory of Captain Charles Leonard Kirkconnell, a prominent local businessman with strong ties to the Sister Islands. Its previous name was Gerrard-Smith International Airport.

== Airlines and destinations ==
Airlines	Destinations
Cayman Airways	Grand Cayman, Miami
Cayman Airways Express	Grand Cayman, Little Cayman
Island Air	Charter: Grand Cayman, Little Cayman

Cayman Airways currently operates Boeing 737 MAX 8 jetliner service into the airport with limited flights operated on a less than daily basis nonstop to Grand Cayman as well as a weekly 737-8 nonstop southbound from Miami while Cayman Airways Express flies de Havilland Canada DHC-6 Twin Otter STOL capable turboprops and Saab 340B regional turboprops to Grand Cayman with Twin Otter service also being operated to the neighboring island of Little Cayman. In addition, according to the Cayman Airways flight schedule the airline is currently operating direct no change of plane 737-8 jet service every Saturday from Cayman Brac to Denver via a stop in Grand Cayman.

== Historical airline service ==
In 1965, Cayman Brac Airways (CBA), a subsidiary of LACSA Airlines, was operating twice weekly round trip service flown with a Beech Model 18 twin prop aircraft on a routing of Grand Cayman – Little Cayman (flag stop only) – Cayman Brac – Montego Bay. According to the airline's 1 May 1965 timetable, connecting service to Miami via Grand Cayman was offered by LACSA, an airline based in Costa Rica, while additional CBA connecting service to Miami as well as to New York City was offered by Pan Am via Montego Bay.

In 1968, the government of the Cayman Islands purchased a controlling interest in Cayman Brac Airways from LACSA and then formed Cayman Airways which operated several different aircraft types over the years between Cayman Brac, Grand Cayman and Little Cayman including the Britten-Norman Trislander commuter three engine prop aircraft, the Hawker Siddeley HS 748 twin turboprop and the Short 330 commuter twin turboprop. The first aircraft type to be operated by Cayman Airways into Cayman Brac was the Douglas DC-3 which in 1972 was being used on flights to both Grand Cayman and Little Cayman from the airport. By 1985, Cayman Airways was serving Cayman Brac with Boeing 727-200 jetliners with nonstop flights to Miami three days a week as well as operating 727 and propeller aircraft service to Grand Cayman. Other jetliner types previously operated by Cayman Airways over the years into Cayman Brac included the Boeing 737-200, Boeing 737-300, Boeing 737-400 and Boeing 737-800.

In the spring and summer of 1978, U.S.-based regional air carrier Red Carpet Airlines was operating nonstop service twice a week between Cayman Brac and the St. Petersburg/Clearwater International Airport (PIE) in Florida as well as interisland flights nonstop between Cayman Brac and Grand Cayman five days a week, with both services being flown with twin-engine Convair 440 prop aircraft. According to the Official Airline Guide (OAG), in December 1978 Red Carpet Airlines was operating Britten-Norman Trislander and Douglas DC-3 interisland service from Grand Cayman to Cayman Brac with ten flights a week with two of these flights making an intermediate stop on Little Cayman (LYB) as well as operating four DC-3 flights a week from St. Petersburg/Clearwater via an intermediate stop in Key West (EYW). By the summer of 1980, Red Carpet was operating direct one-stop service twice a week between Cayman Brac and Tampa International Airport (TPA) via a stop at Grand Cayman and by the spring of 1981, the airline was operating a weekly nonstop flight to Tampa as well as a weekly direct one-stop service to Tampa via Grand Cayman with all flights being operated with Convair 440 aircraft. In the spring of 1982, Red Carpet successor AeroSun International was continuing to operate Convair 440 service between Cayman Brac and Tampa with a once a week roundtrip nonstop flight as well as once a week roundtrip direct one-stop service via Grand Cayman.

== See also ==
- Transport in the Cayman Islands
- List of airports in the Cayman Islands
