= BermudAir =

Airline of Bermuda

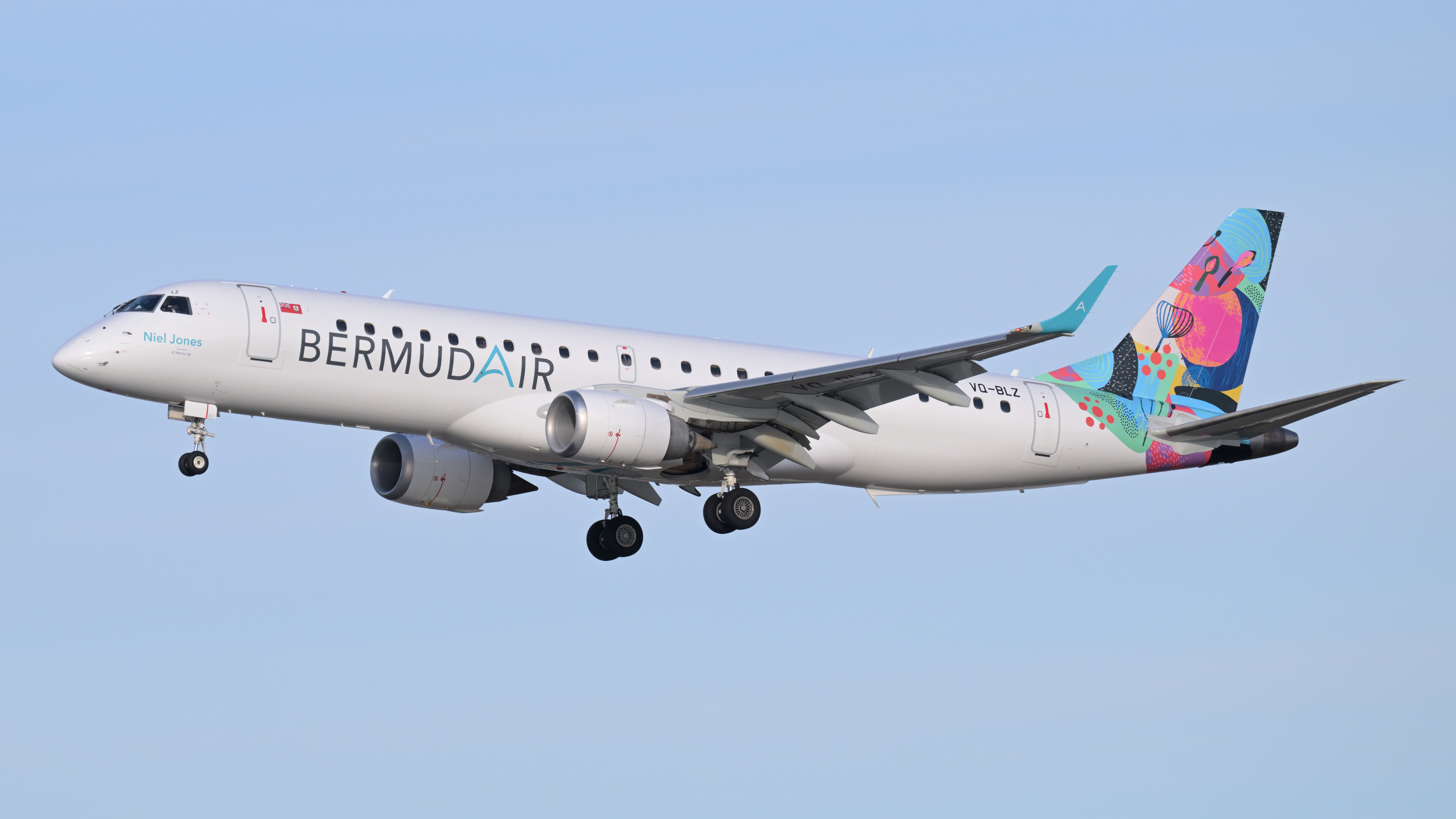
- A BermudAir Embraer 190
IATA	ICAO	Call sign
2T	BMA	GOSLING
- Founded: May 5, 2023; 3 years ago
- Commenced operations: August 31, 2023; 3 years ago
- Hubs: L.F. Wade International Airport
- Fleet size: 4
- Destinations: 11
- Headquarters: Hamilton, Bermuda
- Key people: Adam Scott (Founder & CEO); Ryan Gilman (CFO); Charles McKee (CCO); George Henderson (COO); Marty Amick (CPO)
- Website: flybermudair.com

BermudAir is the flag carrier of Bermuda, operating from L.F. Wade International Airport in St. George's, Bermuda. On 1 September 2023, the airline began operating flights between its base in Bermuda and the United States. BermudAir gained its air operator's certificate from the Bermuda Civil Aviation Authority on 26 July 2023, and US DOT approval on 7 August 2023. BermudAir is the first locally established Bermudian airline.

In December 2025, BermudAir launched seasonal flights from Anguilla's Clayton J. Lloyd International Airport to Baltimore, Boston, and Newark under the new AnguillAir brand.

== Destinations ==
BermudAir currently operates flights to east coast cities in the United States as well as to eastern Canada. The airline's destinations including Bermuda include:

Country	City	Airport	Notes	Refs
Anguilla	The Valley	Clayton J. Lloyd International Airport	Seasonal	
Belize	Belize City	Philip S. W. Goldson International Airport	Begins 19 December 2026	
Bermuda	St. George's	L.F. Wade International Airport	Hub	
Canada	Halifax	Halifax Stanfield International Airport		
Canada	Montreal	Montréal–Trudeau International Airport		
Canada	Toronto	Toronto Pearson International Airport		
Cayman Islands	George Town	Owen Roberts International Airport	Begins 18 December 2026	
Guatemala	Guatemala City	La Aurora International Airport	Begins 19 December 2026	
Turks and Caicos Islands	Providenciales	Providenciales International Airport	Begins 26 October 2026	
Turks and Caicos Islands	South Caicos	Norman B. Saunders Sr. International Airport	Begins 20 December 2026	
United States	Baltimore	Baltimore/Washington International Airport		
United States	Boston	Logan International Airport		
United States	Charleston	Charleston International Airport	Terminated	
United States	Fort Lauderdale	Fort Lauderdale–Hollywood International Airport	Resumes 26 October 2026	
United States	Hartford	Bradley International Airport	Terminated	
United States	Newark	Newark Liberty International Airport		
United States	New York	LaGuardia Airport	Terminated	
United States	Orlando	Orlando International Airport	Terminated	
United States	Orlando/Sanford	Orlando Sanford International Airport	Seasonal	
United States	Providence	Rhode Island T. F. Green International Airport	Terminated	
United States	Raleigh/Durham	Raleigh-Durham International Airport	Resumes 20 December 2026	
United States	Richmond	Richmond International Airport	Terminated	
United States	St. Petersburg/Clearwater	St. Pete–Clearwater International Airport	Begins 20 December 2026	
United States	White Plains	Westchester County Airport		

=== Partners ===
BermudAir currently has a partnership with Hahn Air.

== Fleet ==
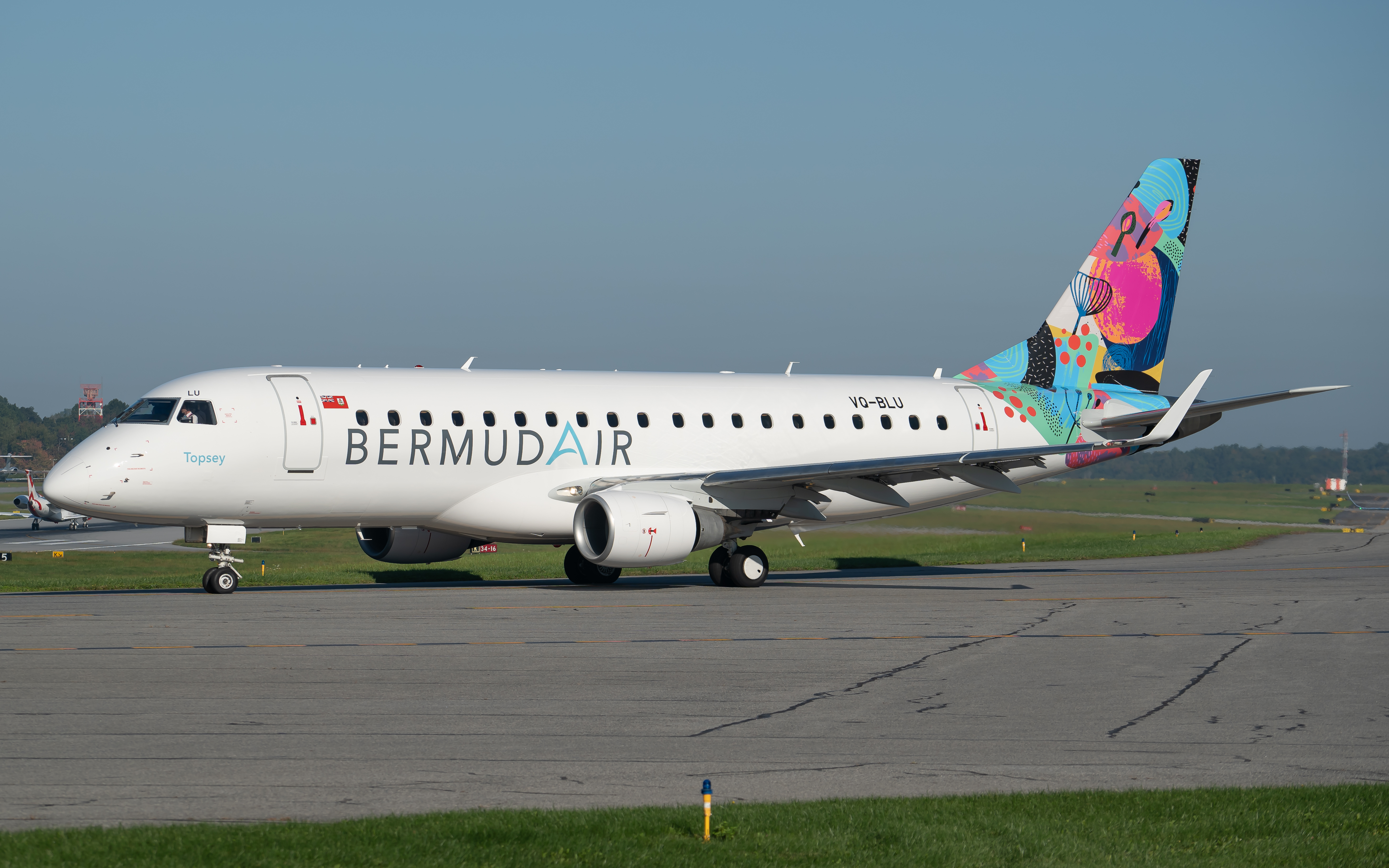
VQ-BLU, one of BermudAir's two E175s

BermudAir has leased two Embraer 175 aircraft, which formerly flew for Flybe. As of July 2026, the BermudAir fleet consists of the following aircraft:

BermudAir fleet
Aircraft	In service	Orders	Passengers			Notes
Aircraft	In service	Orders	F	Y	Total	Notes
Airbus A220-300	—	10	TBA		135	Deliveries begin 2027.
Embraer 175	2	—	10	60	70	
Embraer 190	2	1	8	88	96	
Cargo fleet
Embraer 190F	—	1	Cargo			
Total	4	12				

== Cabin and service ==
=== Seating ===
At launch, the airline's Embraer 175s had 88 seats in a single-class configuration, but only sold 44 on each flight, affording customers the benefit of additional space. In October 2023, the airline announced that its aircraft will be reconfigured with dual-class cabin.

== See also ==
- List of airlines of Bermuda
- List of largest airlines in Central America and the Caribbean
