= Transport in the Cayman Islands =

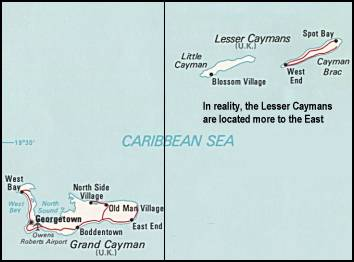
Map of the Cayman Islands, with major roads marked in red.

The transport infrastructure of the Cayman Islands includes a 785 kilometre long public road network with seven active bus routes. There are three airports on the islands.

== Roads ==
The National Roads Authority, which oversees the development and maintenance of roads in the Cayman Islands, was established on 1 July 2004. Traffic surveys were conducted in 1999 and 2016.

Of the people whose main mode of transportation to work was in a private vehicle in 2021, 52% lived in George Town, 21% in Bodden Town, 20% in West Bay, and 2% each in North Side and East End. East End was the only settlement in which private vehicles were not the main method of transportation to school for the majority of the population.

In 2021, 84% of people whose main mode of transportation to work was bicycles lived in George Town. Legislation on electric bicycles and scooters requiring a driver’s license and other regulations was passed in 2018, but did not come into effect until 2026.

As of 2024, there are 785 kilometres of paved roads. In March 2024, there were over 50,000 registered vehicles and over 62,000 licensed drivers in the Cayman Islands.

== Airports ==
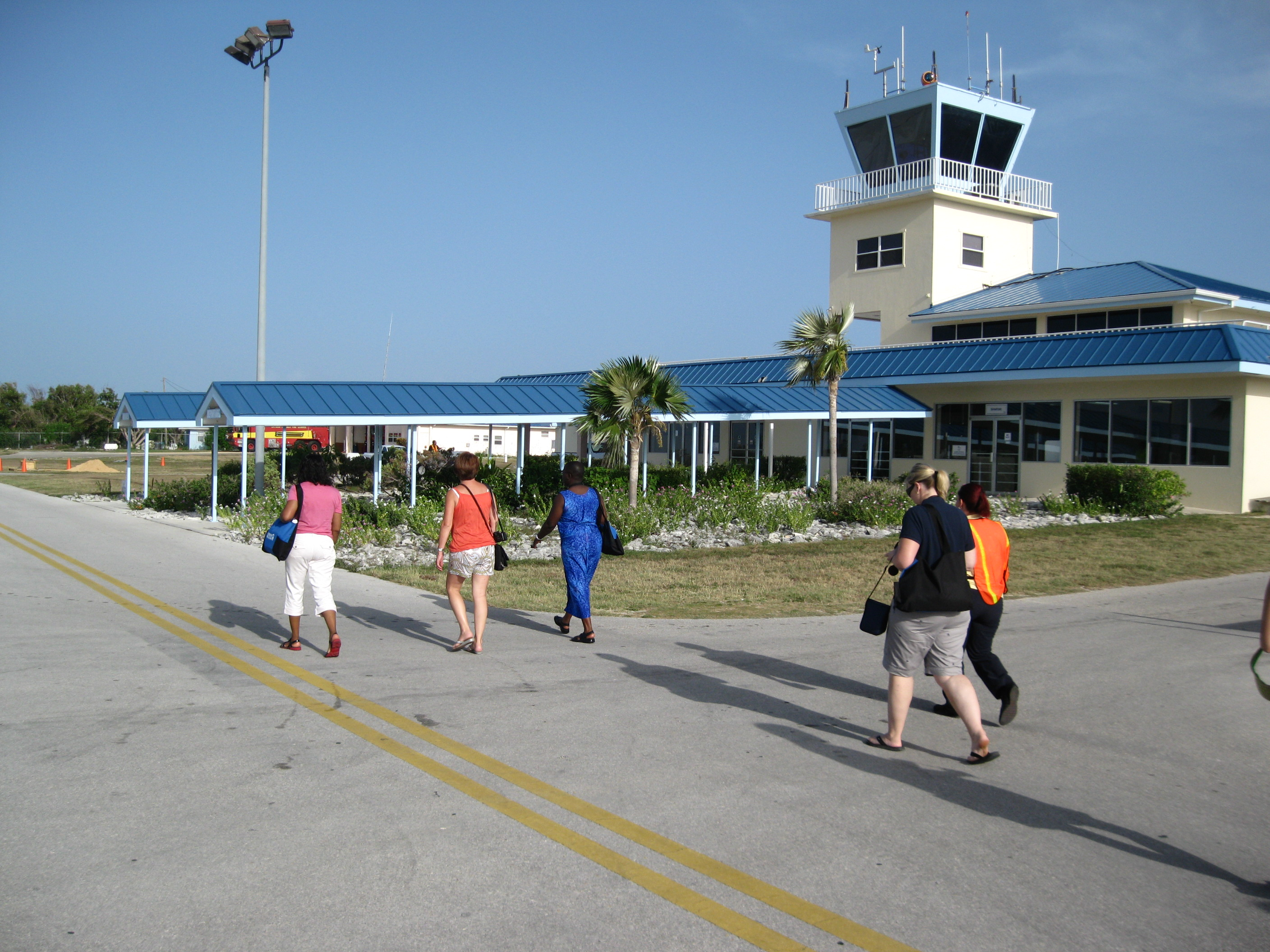
Charles Kirkconnell International Airport (Cayman Brac)

Owen Roberts International Airport, Charles Kirkconnell International Airport, and Edward Bodden Airfield are the three airports on the islands. A fourth airport on Little Cayman was proposed in the 2020s.

== Buses ==
As of 2023, eight bus routes exist in the Cayman Islands and seven are active. There were three routes active in West Bay, one in George Town, one in East End, and two in North Side. These routes run for a total of 345.8 miles.

2023 bus routes in the Cayman Islands
Line	Route	Length
Route 1	West Bay	19.6 miles
Route 2	West Bay	21.4 miles
Route 3	West Bay	24.5 miles
Route 4A	George Town	4.1 miles
Route 5	George Town	Not in operation
Route 7A	East End	49.2 miles
Route 7B	East End	59.3 miles
Route 8A	North Side	54.2 miles
Route 8B	North Side	64.3 miles
Route 9A	North Side	49.2 miles

== Works cited ==
=== News ===
- "First island-wide traffic survey in 17 years hits the road". Cayman Compass. 17 February 2016. Archived from the original on 9 May 2026.
- "New road markings show speed limits to promote safety". Cayman Compass. 21 May 2024. Archived from the original on 9 May 2026.
- Connolly, Norma (29 March 2024). "Safety concerns heighten with more than 50,000 cars on roads". Cayman Compass. Archived from the original on 9 May 2026.
- Connolly, Norma (11 July 2023). "Three airports, two decades, one master plan". Cayman Compass. Archived from the original on 9 May 2026.
- Hainey, Raymond (11 March 2026). "Four e-bike/e-scooter users cited since March crackdown began". Cayman Compass. Archived from the original on 9 May 2026.
- Markoff, Alan (17 January 2026). "E-bike and scooter law enforcement pushed to 1 March". Cayman Compass. Archived from the original on 9 May 2026.

=== Web ===
- "Assessment of a Public Transport Strategy – Final Report" (PDF). Ministry of Tourism and Transport. 18 May 2023. Archived (PDF) from the original on 9 May 2026.
- "Roadways - Cayman Islands". The World Factbook. Archived from the original on 9 May 2026.
