= List of airlines of the Falkland Islands =

This is a list of airlines currently operating in the Falkland Islands.

Airline	IATA	ICAO	Callsign	Image	Commenced operations
British Antarctic Survey		BAN	PENGUIN		1943
Falkland Islands Government Air Service					1948

== See also ==
- List of airlines
