= List of airlines of Bermuda =

This is a list of airlines currently operating in Bermuda.

Airline	Image	IATA	ICAO	Callsign	Founded	Notes
BermudAir		2T	BMA	GOSLING	2023	
Longtail Aviation		6T	LGT	LONGTAIL	1999	

== See also ==
- Lists of airlines
- List of defunct airlines of Bermuda
