= List of airlines of Montserrat =

This is a list of airlines operating in Montserrat.

== Active ==
Airline	Image	IATA	ICAO	Callsign	Founded	Notes
FlyMontserrat		5M	MNT	MONTSERRAT	2009	

== Defunct ==
Airline	Image	IATA	ICAO	Callsign	Founded	Ceased operations	Notes
Air Montserrat					2006	2007	
Montserrat Air Service					1980	1999	

== See also ==
- List of airlines
- List of airlines of the Americas
- List of defunct airlines of the Americas
