= The Bluff (Cayman Islands) =

Mountain in the Cayman Islands

Coordinates: 19°44′00″N 79°45′00″W

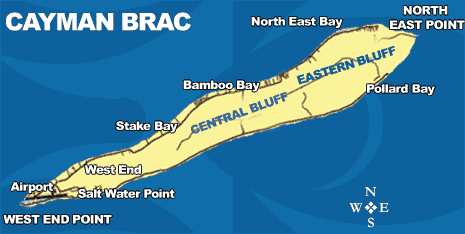
Map of Cayman Brac

The Bluff is the highest part of the Cayman Islands, a British Overseas Territory in the Caribbean Sea. It stands at the eastern end of the island of Cayman Brac and has a maximum elevation of 43 m (141 ft).

== Description ==
The Bluff is a low plateau of karstic limestone, gently rising towards the eastern end of the island. Much of it supports a diverse dry forest dominated by Cedrela odorata, Sideroxylon salicifolium, Exothea paniculata, Chionanthus caymanensis and Bursera simaruba. The forest has a long history of logging and is a mosaic of old growth and second growth trees. Some 473 ha has been identified by BirdLife International as the Bluff Forest Important Bird Area (IBA) because it supports significant populations of white-crowned pigeons, Cuban amazons, Caribbean elaenias, thick-billed vireos and vitelline warblers. The IBA encompasses the 82 ha National Trust’s Brac Parrot Reserve which protects mature and standing dead trees as nesting habitat for the Cuban amazon parrots.
