= Cayman Airways =

Flag carrier airline of the Cayman Islands

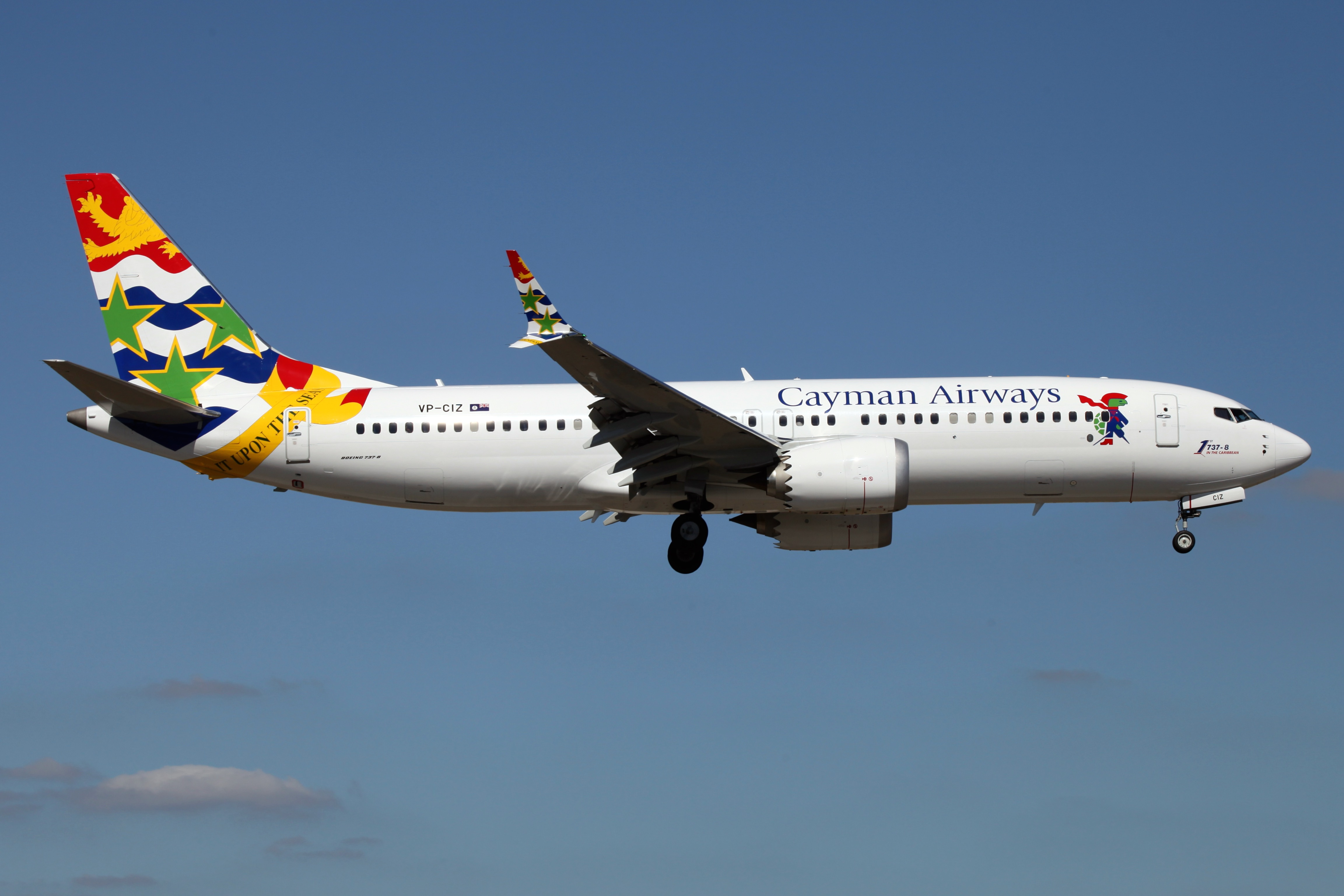
IATA	ICAO	Call sign
KX	CAY	CAYMAN
- Founded: 1968 (as Cayman Brac Airways)
- Commenced operations: 7 August 1968
- Hubs: Owen Roberts International Airport
- Frequent-flyer program: Sir Turtle Rewards
- Subsidiaries: Cayman Airways Express
- Fleet size: 9
- Destinations: 12
- Headquarters: George Town, Grand Cayman, Cayman Islands
- Key people: Fabian Whorms - president and CEO; Paul Tibbetts CPA - executive VP and CFO
- Website: caymanairways.com

Cayman Airways is the flag carrier airline of the British Overseas Territory of the Cayman Islands. With its head office in Grand Cayman, it operates mainly as an international and domestic scheduled passenger carrier, with cargo services available on most routes. Its operations are based at Owen Roberts International Airport in George Town, Grand Cayman. The company slogan is, "Those who fly with us love us."

== History ==
=== Early history: 1968–1975 ===
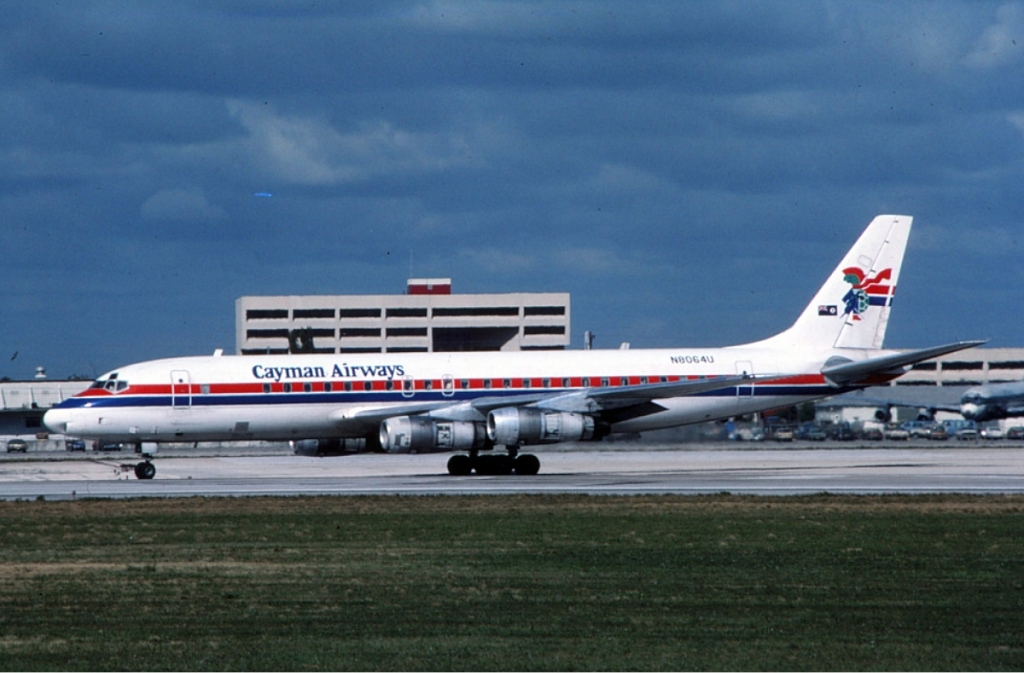
Cayman Airways Douglas DC-8-52 in 1985. This particular aircraft was leased from United Airlines.

The airline was established and started operations on 7 August 1968. It was formed following the Cayman Islands Government's purchase of 51% of Cayman Brac Airways, which had been founded in 1955, from LACSA, the Costa Rican flag carrier, and became wholly government-owned in December 1977. LACSA had been serving Grand Cayman since the mid 1950s as an intermediate stop on its route between San José, Costa Rica, and Miami, with some flights also making a stop in Havana, Cuba, as well between Grand Cayman and Miami. In 1965, Cayman Brac Airways (which was also known as CBA Airways Ltd.) was operating regional services from Owen Roberts International Airport in George Town, Grand Cayman, to Gerrard Smith International Airport (since renamed Charles Kirkconnell International Airport) on Cayman Brac as well as to Little Cayman via a flag stop and also to Montego Bay, Jamaica. A weekly service with a twin-engine Beechcraft Model 18 aircraft was being operated on a routing of Grand Cayman – Little Cayman (flag stop only) – Cayman Brac – Montego Bay, with an additional weekly service being flown between Grand Cayman and Cayman Brac with an intermediate stop on occasion at Little Cayman as a flag stop. Connecting services from Grand Cayman were available for LACSA flights for services to Miami and also for Pan Am flights at Montego Bay for connecting service to Miami and New York City.

Early on, Cayman Airways' first aircraft was a single Douglas DC-3. A few months after it was formed, the airline flew its first international route to Kingston, Jamaica, operating five times a week using a BAC One-Eleven twin jet wet-leased from LACSA. International services to Miami were operated eight times a week using a single leased Douglas DC-6 propliner. By the winter of 1973, Cayman Airways was operating stretched BAC One-Eleven series 500 aircraft on both of its jet routes, with seventeen flights a week between Grand Cayman and Miami as well as five flights a week between Grand Cayman and Kingston. The airline was also offering direct connecting jet service between Miami and Kingston via Grand Cayman at this time.

=== Expansion: 1976–1989 ===
In 1976, the airline had increased competition on the Grand Cayman-Miami route, as Southern Airways and LACSA were both operating nonstop jet service on the route. By the late 1970s, Cayman Airways had commenced its second nonstop route to the United States, with service between Grand Cayman and Houston George Bush Intercontinental Airport operated with a BAC One-Eleven series 500.

In 1979, an additional BAC One-Eleven jet, as well as a Hawker Siddeley 748 turboprop and a Britten-Norman Trislander prop aircraft, were purchased and added to the fleet.

In 1982, the airline replaced its two BAC One-Eleven jets with Boeing 727-200 aircraft, strengthening the airline's regional and international capability. This also allowed for the introduction of first-class service. Cayman Airways also operated a single Douglas DC-8-52 and a leased Boeing 727-100 during the 1980s. These were eventually replaced with Boeing 737-200 jets, which in turn were then subsequently replaced with Boeing 737-300 aircraft. Boeing 737-400 jetliners were previously operated as well.

During the 1980s, Cayman Airways offered scheduled or charter service to Atlanta, Baltimore, Boston, Chicago, Detroit, Houston, Minneapolis, Newark, New York City, Philadelphia, St. Louis and Tampa, as well as Kingston and Montego Bay in Jamaica.Panama City, Panama, was served at one point. The airline also flew between Miami and Grand Turk Island, as well as Providenciales in the Turks & Caicos Islands. These were the only routes flown by the carrier that did not directly serve the Cayman Islands. Cayman Airways has also operated jet service to Cayman Brac with 727-200, 737-200 and 737-400 aircraft, including nonstop flights between Cayman Brac and Miami.

=== Struggles: 1990s ===
Throughout the early 1990s, the airline struggled. According to the Official Airline Guide (OAG), in 1991, three other air carriers, American Airlines, Northwest Airlines and Pan Am, were competing with Cayman Airways on the Grand Cayman-Miami route, with a combined total of 41 nonstop jet flights a week being operated by the four airlines. Financial assistance from the Cayman Islands government as well as financial restructuring, plus newer, more modern aircraft and the addition of new destinations such as Chicago, Dallas/Fort Worth, and Havana, were beneficial for the airline at the time.

=== Recent history: 2000s ===
On January 1, 2004, Cayman Airways Introduced Their First Boeing 737-300 (registration VP-CKY) from the International Lease Finance Corporation (ILFC).

In 2005, Cayman Airways was the only airline operating nonstop service from Grand Cayman to Chicago O'Hare Airport (ORD) with a weekly 737 flight.

In 2016, it was announced that four new Boeing 737 MAX 8 aircraft would be introduced between late 2018 and 2020, allowing for the eventual retirement of the 737-300 aircraft then operated by the airline. The airline also added one 737-800 as an interim measure as a "bridge" aircraft between the 737-300 and the new 737 MAX 8. Cayman Airways Express also introduced Saab 340 regional turboprop aircraft between 2015 and 2016 in tandem with the eventual planned phased retirement of the de Havilland Canada DHC-6 aircraft as a part of the overall fleet modernisation plan.

On Wednesday, 8 November 2017, the retirement process of the 737-300 began, with the first aircraft being phased out.

On 27 August 2018, Cayman Airways announced that they were adding Denver, Colorado (DEN), to its list of gateways, adding that this flight would be the longest scheduled commercial flight the airline had ever operated. Cayman Airways was planning to operate these seasonal five-hour nonstop flights from Grand Cayman to Denver twice weekly, starting 2 March 2019, until August, and then resume service in December 2019. The airline stated it would be operating its new 737 MAX 8 aircraft on this service. It was also mentioned that other destinations were being considered, such as Los Angeles, San Francisco, Vancouver, B.C., London, England, and Brazil.

However, these new services would require the runway at Owen Roberts International Airport to be lengthened. This runway lengthening project was expected to occur within the next several years.

In October 2018, the first of the airline's 737 MAX 8 aircraft was on the final assembly line at the Boeing Renton Factory in Renton, Washington. The second 737 MAX 8 aircraft for the airline was on the assembly line at Boeing Renton Factory in late January/early February.

On 8 November 2018, the first of the airline's new 737 MAX 8 aircraft accomplished its first major test flight.

Shortly after the first test flight of the airline's first 737 MAX 8, Cayman Airways issued a statement about the safety of the new aircraft and its acceptance into the airline after concerns due to a crash of an aircraft of the same type. Cayman Airways CEO and president Fabian Whorms stated, "I can give a full assurance that our new aircraft will not be delivered or accepted unless it has thoroughly passed all required post-production flight and ground tests successfully. Cayman Airways operates within the strict parameters of a comprehensive and robust Safety Management System, and our new Boeing 737 MAX 8 aircraft will enter passenger service only after both the aircraft and the airline are in full compliance with all safety-related requirements".

The airline's first 737 MAX 8 was handed over to the airline on 29 November 2018. The second was delivered on 6 and 7 March. The third was expected to be produced and delivered by September 2019. The last of the four 737 MAX 8 aircraft that were ordered by the airline was expected to be delivered in September 2020.

On 2 March 2019, the airline began its inaugural service to Denver, Colorado. This new service (flight number KX 442) was operated with the airline's new 737 MAX 8.

On 10 March 2019, Cayman Airways issued a statement about the temporary suspension of the new Boeing 737 MAX 8 aircraft after further concerns increased due to a second crash of the aircraft type operated by Ethiopian Airlines in Africa. Cayman Airways CEO Fabian Whorms stated, "We have taken the decision to suspend operations of both our new Boeing 737 Max 8 aircraft, effective from Monday, 11 March 2019, until more information is received". He also stated, "Cayman Airways is currently working in coordination with both the Boeing Corporation and the Civil Aviation Authority of the Cayman Islands (CAACI) to monitor the investigation into Ethiopian Airlines Flight 302".

=== Modern history: 2020s ===
In late January 2021, the Civil Aviation Authority of the Cayman Islands (CAACI) rescinded its airspace restriction for the 737 MAX 8. This was done following clearance by the US Federal Aviation Administration (FAA) at the end of 2020 and approval in January 2021 by the UK Civil Aviation Authority (UK CAA) and the European Union Aviation Safety Agency (EASA). Officials explained that the decision followed the approval of extensive modifications to the design of the aircraft, to how it is flown, and to pilot training. This included modifications to the aircraft's Maneuvering Characteristics Augmentation System (MCAS), as well as other key safety changes aimed at preventing further accidents.

On 10 February 2021, the Cayman Airways CEO announced the ungrounding of its own 737 MAX 8 aircraft and a “Return To Service (RTS)” plan to reestablish the aircraft back into service.

In early February 2021, the Cayman Islands Pilots Association (CAPA) issued a statement regarding the reentry of the 737 MAX 8 aircraft, stating "The B737-8 is one of the safest planes to fly on".

During the week of the 10 February press conference, Cayman Airways announced public viewing and walkthroughs of the newly upgraded 737 MAX 8 aircraft and watch some of the operational test flights at Owen Roberts International Airport and Charles Kirkconnell International Airport over the weekend.

Between the first half of 2020 to the second half of 2021, Cayman Airways, like many other airlines, had taken a hit due to the COVID-19 pandemic. However, from mid 2020 through the third quarter of 2021, Cayman Airways operated repatriation flights through the government's Travel Cayman programme. The airline returned to a reduced commercial flight schedule during the fourth quarter of 2021.

On 21 October 2021, Cayman Airways cancelled its service to La Ceiba, Honduras, due to the issuance of a NOTAM that Goloson International Airport was downgrading to a Category 6 airport. Cayman Airways had operated the 737 MAX 8 on that route. ICAO requires airports to be Category 7 or higher for the 737 MAX 8 to operate.

In March 2023, during an interview on Cayman Compass talk show The Resh Hour, Cayman Airways CEO Fabian Whorms said that they had begun the process of looking for a third Twin Otter for its Express Fleet. He noted that they might soon replace the Saab 340B+ fleet. He stated, "Ideally, we'd like that whatever we replace it with be something that can also fulfil the mission that the Twin Otters currently fulfil for us. But that's dependent [on] what happens with the Little Cayman aerodrome."

On 24 July 2023, a joint press briefing with government ministers from Barbados and the Cayman Islands as well as Cayman Airways was held. They introduced a twice-weekly direct service to Barbados, introducing the airline to Eastern Caribbean markets and, by way of Barbados, extending to more European markets. They also announced an additional two Los Angeles flights. This came nearly a month after Cayman Airways restarted flights to Panama.

On 17 November 2024, Cayman Airways obtained its third Twin Otter for its Express fleet.

== Destinations ==
As of January 2026, Cayman Airways operates 14 routes to 7 countries.

The airline currently has plans to use their 737 Max 8 aircraft to fly to new destinations, including Bermuda, London, Vancouver, Kansas City, San Francisco, Seattle, and Phoenix.

Country	City	Airport	Notes	Refs
Barbados	Bridgetown	Grantley Adams International Airport	Terminated	
Cayman Islands	Cayman Brac	Charles Kirkconnell International Airport		
Cayman Islands	Grand Cayman	Owen Roberts International Airport	Hub	
Cayman Islands	Little Cayman	Edward Bodden Airfield	Turboprop service only	
Cuba	Havana	José Martí International Airport	Terminated	
Cuba	Holguin	Frank País Airport	Terminated	
Honduras	La Ceiba	Golosón International Airport		
Honduras	Roatan	Juan Manuel Gálvez International Airport	Terminated	
Jamaica	Kingston	Norman Manley International Airport		
Jamaica	Montego Bay	Sangster International Airport	Seasonal	
Panama	Panama City	Tocumen International Airport		
Turks and Caicos Islands	Grand Turk Island	JAGS McCartney International Airport	Terminated	
Turks and Caicos Islands	Providenciales	Providenciales International Airport	Terminated	
United States	Atlanta	Hartsfield–Jackson Atlanta International Airport	Terminated	
United States	Austin	Austin–Bergstrom International Airport	Seasonal	
United States	Chicago	O'Hare International Airport	Terminated	
United States	Dallas	Dallas Fort Worth International Airport	Terminated	
United States	Denver	Denver International Airport	Seasonal	
United States	Houston	George Bush Intercontinental Airport	Terminated	
United States	Los Angeles	Los Angeles International Airport		
United States	Miami	Miami International Airport		
United States	New York City	John F. Kennedy International Airport		
United States	Orlando	Orlando International Airport	Terminated	
United States	Tampa	Tampa International Airport		
United States	Washington, D.C.	Dulles International Airport	Terminated	

=== Interline agreements ===
Cayman Airways currently has interline agreements with the following airlines:

- Air Astana
- Air Canada
- Copa Airlines
- Hahn Air

== Fleet ==
=== Current fleet ===
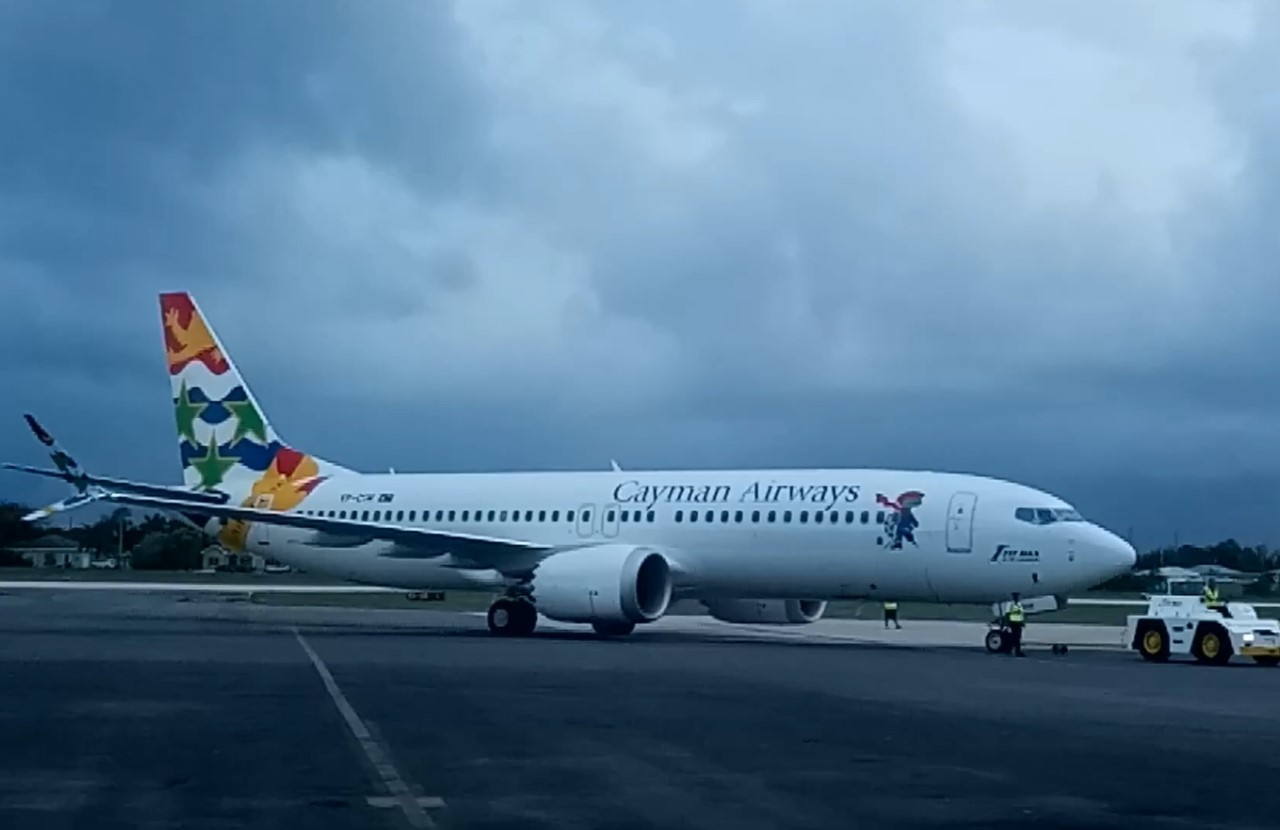
Cayman Airways 737 MAX 8 VP-CIW being towed in after Delivery Flight at Owen Roberts International Airport

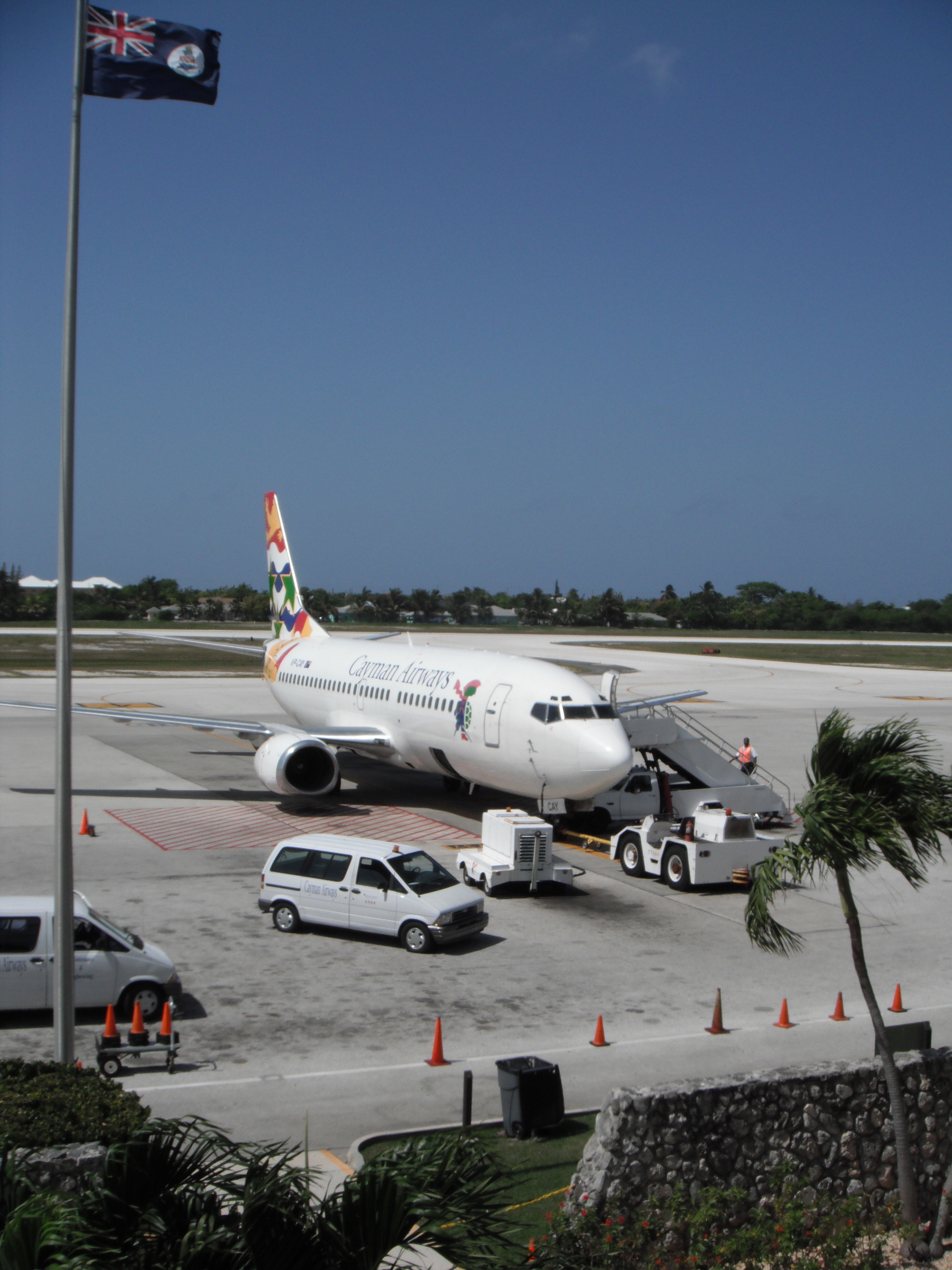
A Boeing 737-300 at Owen Roberts International Airport

As of August 2025, Cayman Airways operates the following aircraft:

Cayman Airways fleet
Aircraft	In service	Orders	Passengers			Notes
Aircraft	In service	Orders	J	Y	Total	Notes
Boeing 737 MAX 8	4	—	16	144	160	
de Havilland Canada DHC-6	3	—	—	19	19	Operated by Cayman Airways Express.
Saab 340	2	—	—	34	34	Operated by Cayman Airways Express.
Total	9	—				

=== Logo ===
The company's mascot is an embellishment of the original "Sir Turtle" designed by Suzy Soto. As first designed, Sir Turtle did not have the red flying scarf. That original design was used on baggage stickers by Cayman Islands Customs and also became the logo of the Department of Tourism which was then headed by Eric Bergstrom. The red flying scarf was later added to Sir Turtle in 1978 by Capt. Wilbur Thompson, then the chief pilot of Cayman Airways, and the modified Sir Turtle became the airline's new logo.

== Head office ==
Cayman Airways' corporate office is located in George Town, at 91 Owen Roberts Drive, almost opposite the Cayman Airways aircraft maintenance facility located at 54 Owen Roberts Drive.

The Cayman Airways corporate office was housed in the former Sammy's Airport Inn. The Cayman Islands government purchased the inn for $2.85 million United States dollars. The fit-out, including the furniture, was completed for $3 million U.S. with the valuation of the property estimated at 6.76 million U.S. as of June 2007. Parking for the head office is located in the adjacent Cayman Islands Airport Authority property, with there being more parking per square foot at the current Cayman Airways head office than in most buildings in George Town.

== Accidents and Incidents ==
Cayman Airways has had no fatal accidents.

- October 12, 1991- A Cayman Airways 737-300 on a flight from Miami to Grand Cayman touched down late on runway 08, due to only half of the runway being available for use, and thrust reversers or speed brakes were not deployed. The runway was wet, and the aircraft overran the runway and fell into the North Sound. Nobody was seriously injured.
- September 14, 2017 - A Cayman Airways Boeing 737-800, registration VP-CNG performing flight KX-200 from Grand Cayman Island (Cayman Islands) to Tampa, FL (USA) with 128 people on board, was climbing through about 5000 feet out of Grand Cayman's runway 08 when the crew observed abnormal right-hand engine (CFM56) indications followed by engine vibrations. The crew stopped the climb at 6000 feet, shut the engine down and returned to Grand Cayman for a safe landing on runway 08 about 30 minutes after departure.
- September 8, 2019 - A Cayman Airways Boeing 737-300, registration VP-CAY performing flight KX-792 from Grand Cayman (Cayman Islands) to New York JFK, NY (USA) with 103 passengers and 5 crew made an emergency landing at Orlando International Airport, after a false cargo smoke warning. The aircraft's evacuation slides were deployed.
- August 8, 2024 - A Cayman Airways 737 MAX 8 from LAX-GCM suffered a flap asymmetry issue on approach. The plane landed safely with minimal flaps at 4:56 P.M. The pilot declared an emergency as a precaution, and emergency vehicles were on standby. The airline released a statement saying the incident occurred due to a false alarm triggered by a faulty sensor.
- August 11, 2024 - The same Cayman Airways 737-8 was on a flight from GCM-JFK, and on approach the aircraft had another issue with its flaps. This time, the pilots received an alert, but this time, it stated that the flaps are unusable. The passengers were told to assume the brace position as the aircraft came in at a high speed. The aircraft was taken out of service, and the sensor was replaced again.

THIS SECTIONS NEEDS TO BE EXPANDED*
