= Owen Roberts International Airport =

Airport in Grand Cayman, Cayman Islands

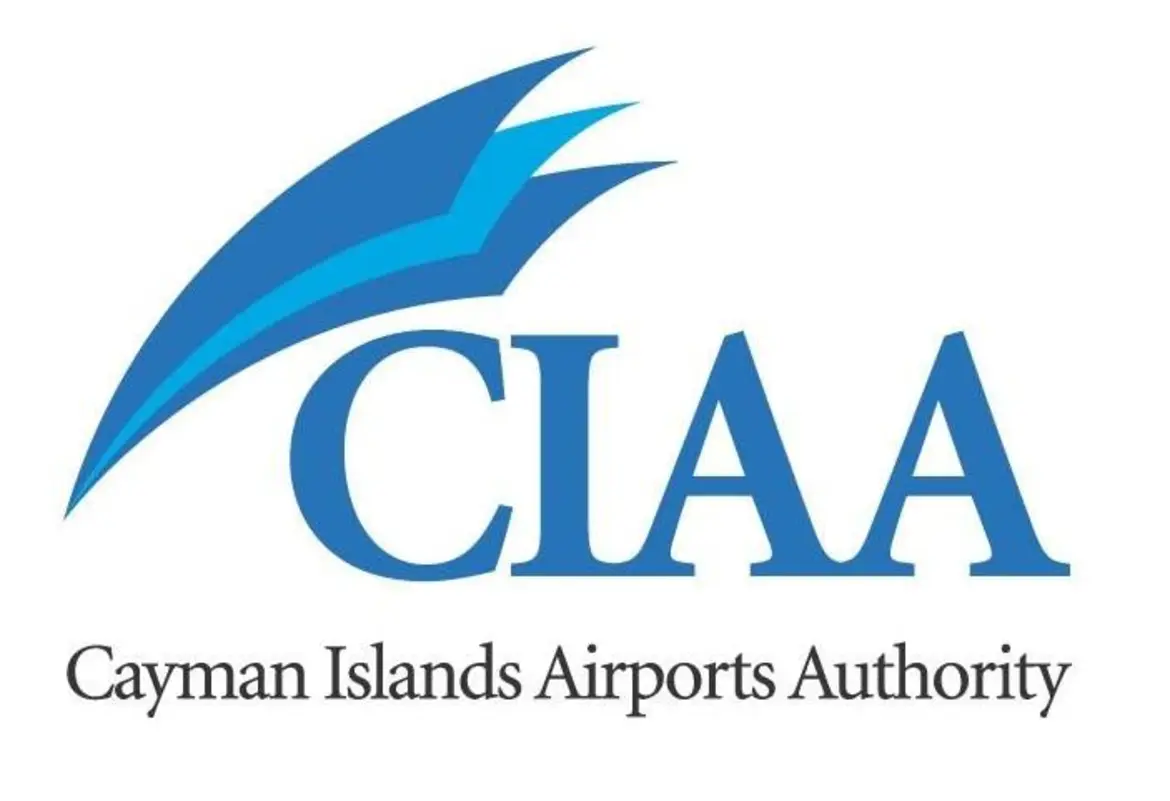

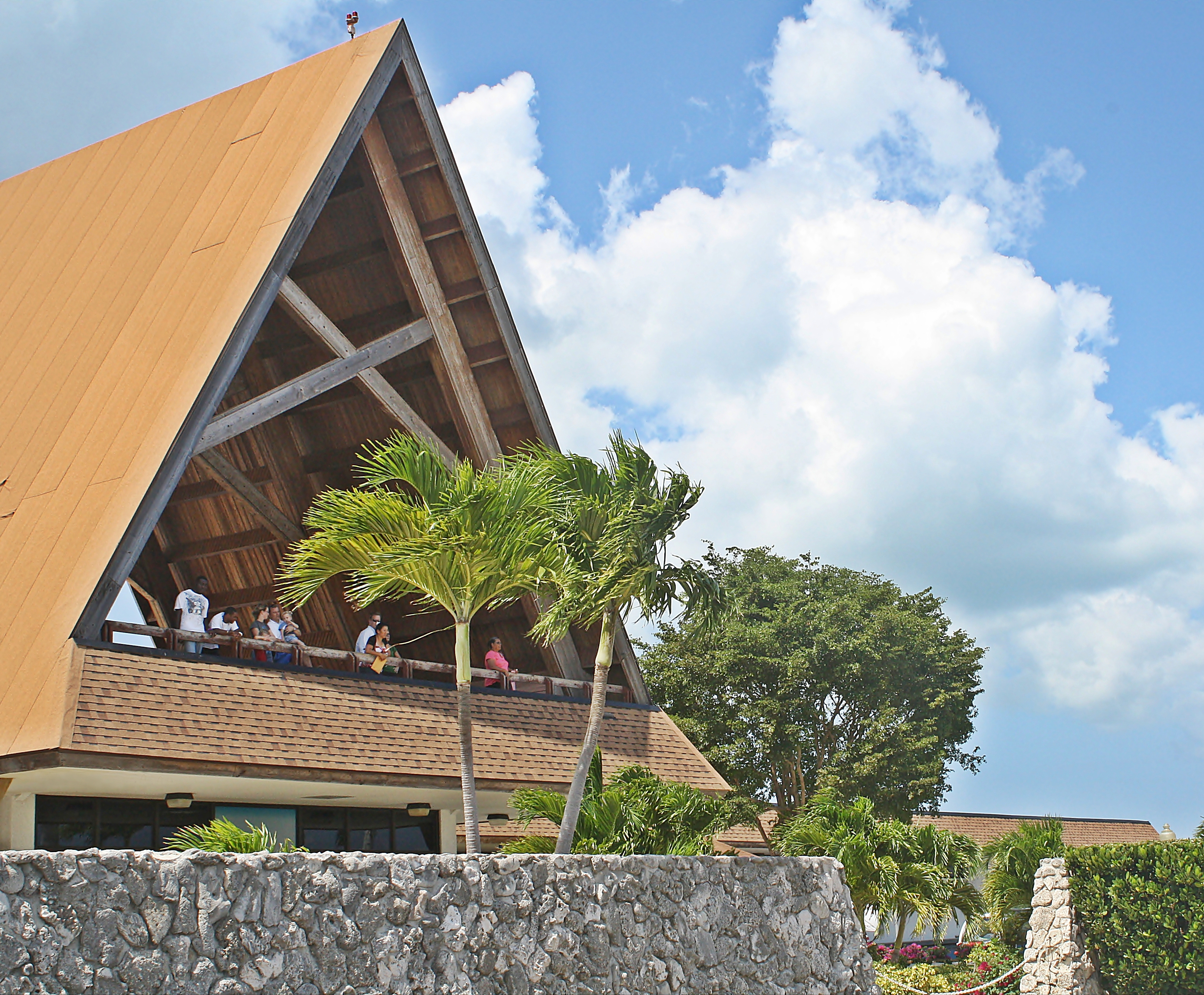
- IATA: GCM; ICAO: MWCR

Summary
- Airport type: Public
- Owner: Cayman Islands Government
- Operator: Cayman Islands Airports Authority (CIAA)
- Location: George Town, Grand Cayman
- Hub for: Cayman Airways
- Elevation AMSL: 8 ft (2.4 m)
- Coordinates: 19°17′33″N 081°21′33″W
- Website: https://www.caymanairports.com

Map
- Location in the Cayman Islands

Runways
Direction	Length		Surface
Direction	m	ft	Surface
08/26	2,398	7,867	Asphalt
- Sources: CIATCA GCM Google Maps

Owen Roberts International Airport (IATA: GCM, ICAO: MWCR) is an airport serving Grand Cayman, Cayman Islands. It is the main international airport for the Cayman Islands as well as the main base for Cayman Airways. The airport is named after British Royal Air Force (RAF) Wing Commander Owen Roberts, a pioneer of commercial aviation in the country, and is one of the two entrance ports to the Cayman Islands.

Owen Roberts International Airport was the only international airport remaining in the Caribbean to have an open-air observation "waving gallery" until January 2017 when it was closed due to reconstruction. The upgraded Owen Roberts International Airport passenger terminal no longer has an outdoor observation "waving gallery".

The runway length includes a 130 metres (430 ft) displaced threshold on Runway 26. The Grand Cayman VOR/DME (Ident: GCM) is located 0.25 nautical miles (460 m) short of Runway 08.

== History ==
Owen Roberts was a Wing Commander in the Royal Air Force, during World War II. Following the war, Roberts retired and later founded Caribbean International Airways (CIA). By 1950, Roberts had established regular service between Grand Cayman and Tampa, Florida; Kingston, Jamaica; and British Honduras (now Belize). During the early 1950s, Caribbean International Airlines was operating weekly seaplane service between Grand Cayman and both Tampa and Kingston with Consolidated PBY Catalina amphibian aircraft as the airstrip on Grand Cayman had yet to be completed. Roberts worked to lobby Cayman Islands Commissioners Ivor Smith and Andrew Gerrard to build airfields on all three of the Cayman Islands. In 1952, construction started on an official airstrip at an estimated cost of £93,000 to construct airports on all three Cayman Islands, a 5,000 ft (1,524 m) runway, along with a terminal was constructed on Grand Cayman at the cost of £100,000. Roberts had acquired two used Lockheed Lodestar twin-prop airliners purchased to keep up with the competition whose interest was now piqued by the soon-to-be completed airfield at George Town.

The inaugural flight of CIA, Ltd. from Kingston, Jamaica to Grand Cayman was set for 10 April 1953. Tragically, however, the Lodestar piloted by Roberts crashed on takeoff from Palisades Airport. 13 people, including the 40-year-old Roberts, were killed. The only survivor of the crash was Roberts' brother-in-law, Lt. Col. Edward Remington-Hobbs. The Grand Cayman Island Airport was later named after Roberts.

== Previous expansion projects ==
In 2007, the Cayman Islands Government announced plans to expand and upgrade the existing airport. Plans include the expansion of the check-in area, the purchase of a new X-ray machine and baggage screening machine as well as the employment of additional passenger screening staff.

Additional renovations completed in 2012 included refurbishing the departure hall interior and adding aquatic paintings to the passport control and customs hall.

== More recent expansion projects ==
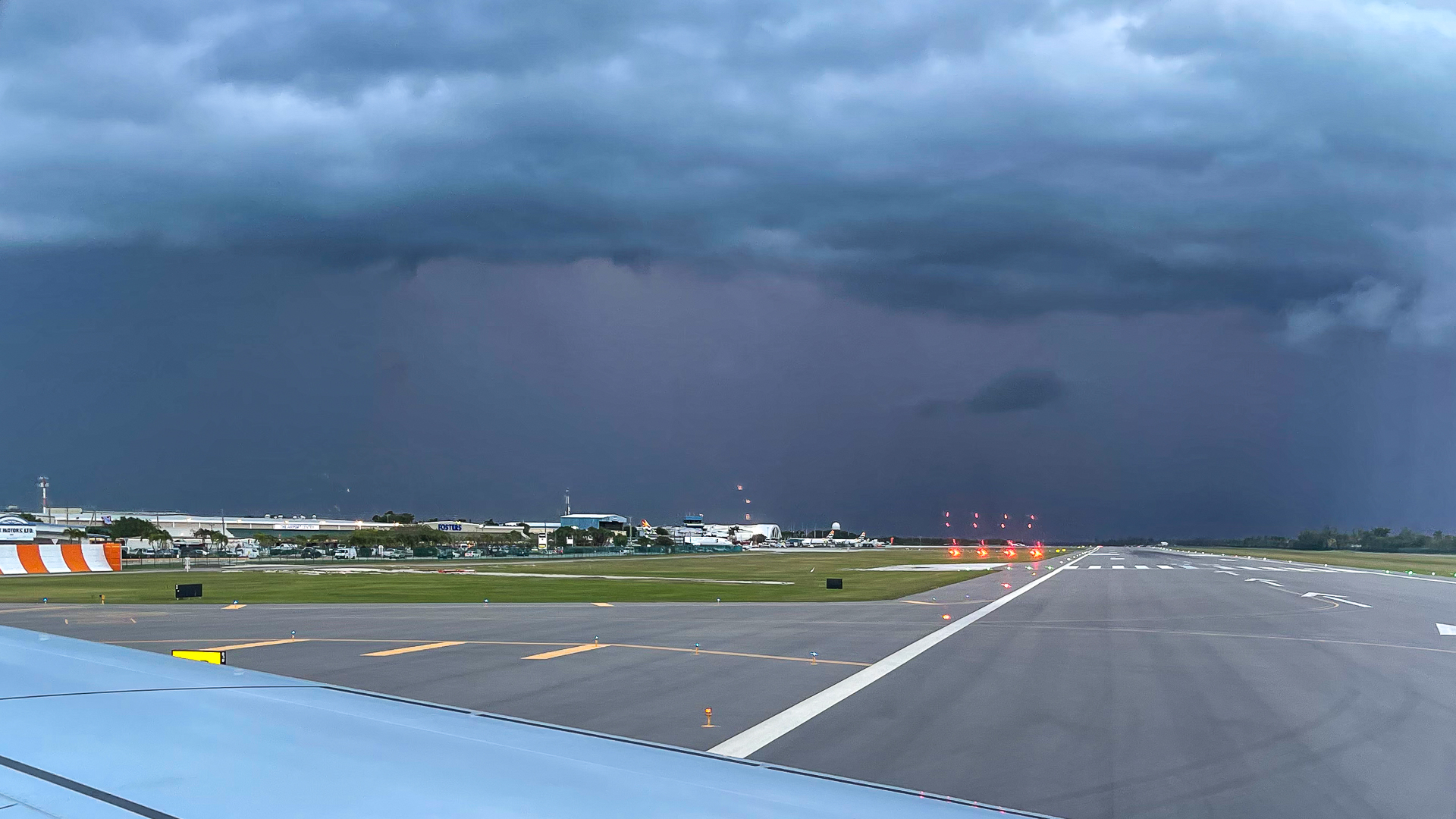
Owen Roberts International Airport 2022

In 2014, Airport Authority unveiled a new plan to perform major renovations at Owen Roberts International Airport as part of a master plan to renovate and redevelop all three Cayman Islands airports. The new plan would expand the current terminal building, passenger parking, public parking, staff parking, aprons, Taxi area, extend the current runway and in the middle to long term build a second terminal building called the Green space Terminal and a parallel taxiway. This new expansion will allow passenger airlines to fly their newer and larger aircraft to Owen Roberts International. British Airways currently serves the airport with Boeing 777-200 wide-body aircraft. The BA operated 777 is the largest aircraft operating scheduled passenger service from Owen Roberts at the present time with flights to and from London Heathrow Airport (LHR) via an intermediate stop in Nassau, Bahamas in both directions. The expansion would also allow other airlines with wide-body, long haul aircraft, such as the Airbus A330, Airbus A340, Boeing 747-400 and the Boeing 787-9, the opportunity to fly to Grand Cayman.

The expansion work began in 2015 with a temporarily extended departure hall being added to accommodate passenger traffic while the tendering process is completed and construction commenced. On 9 March 2015, the Florida-based company RS&H, which is partnered with the Cayman Island Airport Authority, unveiled a new design for Owen Roberts International. This new design is based mostly on the design criteria created by Canadian firm WS&P in 2014. Work on Owen Roberts estimated to cost around some $55 Million KYD. On 23 June 2015, it was confirmed by CIAA CEO Albert Anderson that construction work would start in early August 2015 and is estimated to be finished in generally 2 years. Late in August 2015, it was determined that work would have to be delayed to early September. A groundbreaking ceremony took place on 10 September 2015. In late October 2015, it was announced that phase 2 of the expansion would start in the early part of 2016.

Phase 1 of the expansion was completed by June 2016. Phase 2 began in July 2016. Part of the phase 2 reconstruction was the removal of the famous and only A-frame open-air observation "waving gallery" in the region as it was closed to the public in January 2017. The expansion of the Terminal Building was completed in late February 2019 and grand reopening was on 27 March by Prince Charles on his royal visit to Grand Cayman and Cayman Brac on 27 & 28 March 2019. The expansion of the Apron area and strengthening and lengthening of the runway and taxiways project began in Summer 2019. A bid for contractors for the runway lengthening project commenced and companies had been chosen. In late 2019 into early 2020 movement of wildlife, clearing of area and filling of the ponds west of the runway, west of threshold 08 had commenced, and construction of runway lengthening and apron expansion has begun. This phase expected was completed by June 2020. Due to faster than expected passenger capacity of the newly redeveloped terminal building. Minister of Tourism announced that the phase of the Airport Master Plan that would see to the development of the second terminal building, also known as the Greenspace Terminal Building has been pushed forwards, to after the runway and apron lengthening and expansion phase. The Greenspace Terminal Building development will also include new Apron development, new runway extension considerations, and jet bridges. In addition to the Greenspace Terminal Building development, additional expansion to seating on the second floor of the redeveloped terminal will be done in the short term.

As of 30 November 2020, Owen Roberts International Airport new development project has seen the completion of the 797 ft Runway extension from 08 to near Crewe Road, taking the 7,070 ft runway to the full runway length now 7,867 ft, and the fully paved strip now 8261 ft. Also a new taxiway loop at the end of the runway extension near 08 that saw the movement of taxiways Alpha and Bravo moved to the loop, Charlie and Delta taxiways moved to where the former Alpha and Bravo taxiways were located leading to the general aviation terminal, and Echo and Foxtrot added to where the former Charlie and Delta were leading to the commercial terminal. Due to the build of the runway extension and taxiway loop closer to Crewe Road. A jet blast deflector was erected around the taxiway loop and at the end of the new runway extension dividing the runway from the road. Along with the new taxiway loop and shift in taxiway locations a new parallel taxiway was built and completed creating taxiway Gulf. Also completed in 2020 was the apron extension to the east on the commercial terminal area expanding the aircraft parking stands from 8 to 14. These extensions were opened for operation on 24 February 2021.

In May 2025, the Cayman Islands government approved a $91 million redevelopment plan for the airport. The project would include building a new terminal, extending the runway, and modernizing the air traffic control system. As of May 2025, the Cayman Islands Airports Authority was taking feedback from the public due to the environmental impact of the project.

== Cayman Airways ==
Cayman Airways, the national flag air carrier of the Cayman Islands, has its operational base at the airport. The airline began flights in August 1968 following the purchase of 51% of Cayman Brac Airways by the Cayman Islands Government from LACSA, an air carrier based in Costa Rica. The first aircraft type operated by Cayman Airways was a Douglas DC-3. International service was initially operated to Miami with a leased Douglas DC-6 propliner and the first jet operations were flown between the airport and Kingston, Jamaica with a British Aircraft Corporation BAC One-Eleven leased from LACSA. In 1972, the airline was operating its own stretched BAC One-Eleven series 500 jets on nonstop flights to Miami and Kingston as well as operating Douglas DC-3 service between Grand Cayman, Cayman Brac and Little Cayman. Cayman Airways began nonstop flights to Houston via Intercontinental Airport in the late 1970s and by 1982 had replaced its BAC One-Eleven twin jets with Boeing 727-200 jetliners. Other mainline jet aircraft types operated by the airline over the years included Boeing 727-100, 737-200, 737-400, 737-800 and Douglas DC-8 jets. Cayman Airways currently operates four Boeing 737 MAX 8 jetliners with nonstop service to destinations in Cuba, Honduras, Jamaica and the U.S. as well as local flights to Cayman Brac. These jetliners replaced the four 737-300 aircraft that the airline previously operated, the last of which being taken out of service in April 2021. Cayman Airways Express operates two commuter de Havilland Canada DHC-6 Twin Otter and two Saab 340B turboprop aircraft between Grand Cayman, Cayman Brac and Little Cayman. Cayman Airways Express is to eventually retire both of its DHC 6-300 Twin Otters and was also planning to add another Saab 340B to its fleet. Cayman Airways Express was also planning to expand on short haul regional flights but has not yet announced any new schedules. Cayman Airways also operates 1 Cargo flight that flies from Miami to Grand Cayman using a Convair CV-580 twin Prop aircraft.

The initiation of Cayman Airways flights to Panama City, Panama was anticipated to allow Brazilian tourists to travel to the Cayman Islands via Copa Airlines flights to Panama with connecting passengers then continuing on Cayman Airways flights to the airport.

== Historical airline service ==
Grand Cayman was being served with scheduled passenger flights by the early 1950s when British West Indian Airways (BWIA, which is now Caribbean Airlines) in association with British Overseas Airways Corporation (BOAC, which is now British Airways) was operating one round trip flight a week on a routing of Kingston, Jamaica - Grand Cayman - Belize City with a Vickers Viking twin-prop aircraft with this service being timed to connect to other BOAC and BWIA flights in Kingston. LACSA (which now operates as Avianca Costa Rica) was providing service by the mid-1950s with two round trip flights a week, one with a routing of San Jose, Costa Rica - Grand Cayman - Miami flown with a Convair 340 and the other with a routing of San Jose, Costa Rica - Grand Cayman - Havana, Cuba - Miami flown with a Curtiss C-46. By 1957, BWIA in association with BOAC had added Montego Bay, Jamaica as a stop on their Kingston-Belize City route flown weekly via Grand Cayman. BWIA then introduced nonstop flights to Miami and in 1958 was operating Vickers Viscount turboprop aircraft on a round trip routing of Kingston - Montego Bay - Grand Cayman - Miami twice a week. By 1963, British West Indian was operating daily Viscount propjet service into the airport with a round trip routing of Miami (MIA)-Grand Cayman (GCM)-Montego Bay (MBJ)-Kingston (KIN)-San Juan (SJU)-Antigua (ANU)-Barbados (BGI)-Port of Spain, Trinidad (POS). In 1964, LACSA was operating Douglas DC-6B propliner flights on a routing of San Jose, Costa Rica - Grand Cayman - Miami with round trip service twice weekly.

The jet age arrived in Grand Cayman during the late 1960s when BWIA introduced Boeing 727-100 "Sunjet" service with a routing of Port of Spain, Trinidad - Barbados - Antigua - St. Lucia - San Juan, Puerto Rico - Kingston, Jamaica - Grand Cayman - Miami operated twice a week with a third weekly flight also being flown with the 727 nonstop between Grand Cayman and Miami. By 1970, LACSA had introduced jet service as well flying British Aircraft Corporation BAC One-Eleven twin jets nonstop to Miami eight times a week and also nonstop to San Jose, Costa Rica twice a week. LACSA continued to serve Grand Cayman through the late 1970s with nonstop flights to Miami operated with stretched BAC One-Eleven series 500 jets. By 1980, Air Jamaica was operating McDonnell Douglas DC-9-30 jet service nonstop to Kingston three days a week with a nonstop flight from Montego Bay being operated once a week. Another international airline flying from the airport was Faucett Perú which in 1985 was operating Douglas DC-8 jetliners between Lima, Peru and Miami three days a week via an intermediate stop in Grand Cayman. In 1993, SAHSA, an air carrier based in Honduras, was operating nonstop Boeing 737-200 jet service to La Ceiba, Honduras twice a week with continuing direct service to Tegucigalpa, Honduras. By 1994, Air Jamaica was operating Boeing 727-200 jet service on a routing of Montego Bay - Kingston - Grand Cayman three days a week while Trans-Jamaican Airlines (which subsequently became Air Jamaica Express) was flying ATR 42 propjets on a routing of Montego Bay - Kingston - Grand Cayman - Belize City - Cancún, Mexico twice a week.

The first U.S.-based air carrier to serve Grand Cayman was Southern Airways which began service during the mid-1970s with nonstop Douglas DC-9-10 jet service between the airport and Miami. By the late 1970s, Southern was also operating a weekly nonstop between Fort Lauderdale and Grand Cayman flown with the DC-9 in addition to its daily nonstop service to and from Miami. Southern then merged with another U.S. airline to form Republic Airlines (1979–1986) which in 1979 was continuing to serve the airport with nonstop McDonnell Douglas DC-9-30 flights to Miami. During the early and mid-1980s Republic was operating larger McDonnell Douglas DC-9-50 jetliners on its Grand Cayman-Miami route. In 1986 Republic was acquired by and merged into Northwest Airlines which in turn continued to serve Grand Cayman. In 1987, Northwest was flying McDonnell Douglas DC-9-30 jets from the airport to Miami, Memphis, Tennessee and Montego Bay, Jamaica with daily nonstop service to all three destinations. U.S.-based regional air carriers Red Carpet Airlines and successor AeroSun International operated service between the airport and Tampa (TPA) with Convair 440 prop aircraft with up to six flights a week during the early 1980s. Red Carpet had previously operated direct Convair 440 and Douglas DC-3 service from the St. Petersburg/Clearwater International Airport (PIE) in Florida to Grand Cayman via an intermediate stop in Cayman Brac (CYB). According to the Official Airline Guide (OAG), Red Carpet Airlines was also operating interisland flights between the Cayman Islands in 1978 with ten flights a week from Cayman Brac operated with Britten-Norman Trislander and Douglas DC-3 prop aircraft with two of these flights making an intermediate stop on Little Cayman (LYB).

By 1989, American Airlines, Eastern Air Lines and Pan Am had joined Northwest with regard to operating daily nonstop service between Grand Cayman and Miami with American, Eastern and Pan Am all flying Boeing 727-200 jetliners on the route. Locally based air carrier Cayman Airways was also continuing to fly nonstop service with Boeing 737-400 jets on its core Grand Cayman-Miami route at this time in the face of considerable competition posed by these four U.S.-based airlines with all five airlines operating a combined total of sixty (60) departures a week from the airport to Miami in December 1989. By 1994, American had added daily nonstop service to Raleigh/Durham, North Carolina flown with a Boeing 727-200 and had also introduced Boeing 757-200 jetliners on the Grand Cayman-Miami route while USAir (which was subsequently renamed US Airways and has now been merged into American Airlines) was operating nonstop flights to Charlotte, North Carolina three days a week as well as nonstop service to Tampa flown four days a week with both routes being operated with Boeing 727-200 jets.

By the mid-1990s, British Airways had begun operating nonstop service from London Gatwick Airport once a week as well as weekly one stop service from London Gatwick via Nassau with both flights being operated with McDonnell Douglas DC-10-30 wide body jetliners. British Airways continues to serve Grand Cayman at the present time with direct Boeing 777-200 wide body flights from London Heathrow Airport via a stop in Nassau.

== Airlines and destinations ==
=== Passenger ===
Airlines	Destinations
Air Canada Rouge	Toronto–Pearson
American Airlines	Charlotte, Miami; Seasonal: Chicago–O'Hare, Dallas/Fort Worth, Philadelphia
BermudAir	Seasonal: Bermuda, Providenciales (both begin 18 December 2026)
British Airways	London–Heathrow, Nassau
Cayman Airways	Cayman Brac, Kingston–Norman Manley, La Ceiba, Los Angeles, Miami, Panama City–Tocumen, Tampa; Seasonal: Austin, Denver, Montego Bay, Nashville (begins 21 May 2027)
Cayman Airways Express	Cayman Brac, Little Cayman
Delta Air Lines	Atlanta; Seasonal: Detroit, Minneapolis/St. Paul, New York–JFK
JetBlue	Fort Lauderdale (resumes 23 February 2027), New York–JFK; Seasonal: Boston
Porter Airlines	Seasonal: Ottawa, Toronto–Pearson
Southwest Airlines	Orlando; Seasonal: Baltimore
Sun Country Airlines	Seasonal: Minneapolis/St. Paul
United Airlines	Houston–Intercontinental; Seasonal: Chicago–O'Hare, Newark, Washington–Dulles
WestJet	Toronto–Pearson

=== Cargo ===
Airlines	Destinations
IBC Airways	Miami
Cayman Airways	Miami

== See also ==
- Transport in the Cayman Islands
- List of airports in the Cayman Islands
