= Island Air (Cayman Islands) =

Caymanian airline

Island Air Cayman Islands BWI
- Industry: Aerospace
- Founded: 1987
- Headquarters: George Town, Cayman Islands
- Area served: Grand Cayman
- Key people: Sam Andersen General Manager
- Services: Fixed-base Operations
- Owner: Ross Aviation
- Website: www.islandair.ky

Island Air Cayman Islands BWI is a fixed-base operator in the Cayman Islands providing aircraft charter, air ambulance, ground handling, maintenance, meet and greet services, and aviation management services. The company is located on the grounds of Owen Roberts International Airport. It has one hangar, and one building for flight-planning, Customs and Immigration, and other activities. In February 2019 Ross Aviation, which also owns Rectrix Aviation, acquired Island Air.

== Air ambulance ==
Island Air provides air ambulance services to the Cayman Islands, Central America, Jamaica, and Cuba.

== Charter services ==
The company offers charter flights to the following locations:

In the Caribbean:

- Bahamas
  - Nassau
- Cuba
  - Havana
- Jamaica
  - Montego Bay
- Puerto Rico (United States)
- Turks and Caicos Islands

In Mexico:

- Cancún
- Cozumel

In Central America:

- Belize
- Costa Rica
- Honduras
