= Little Cayman =

One of three Cayman Islands

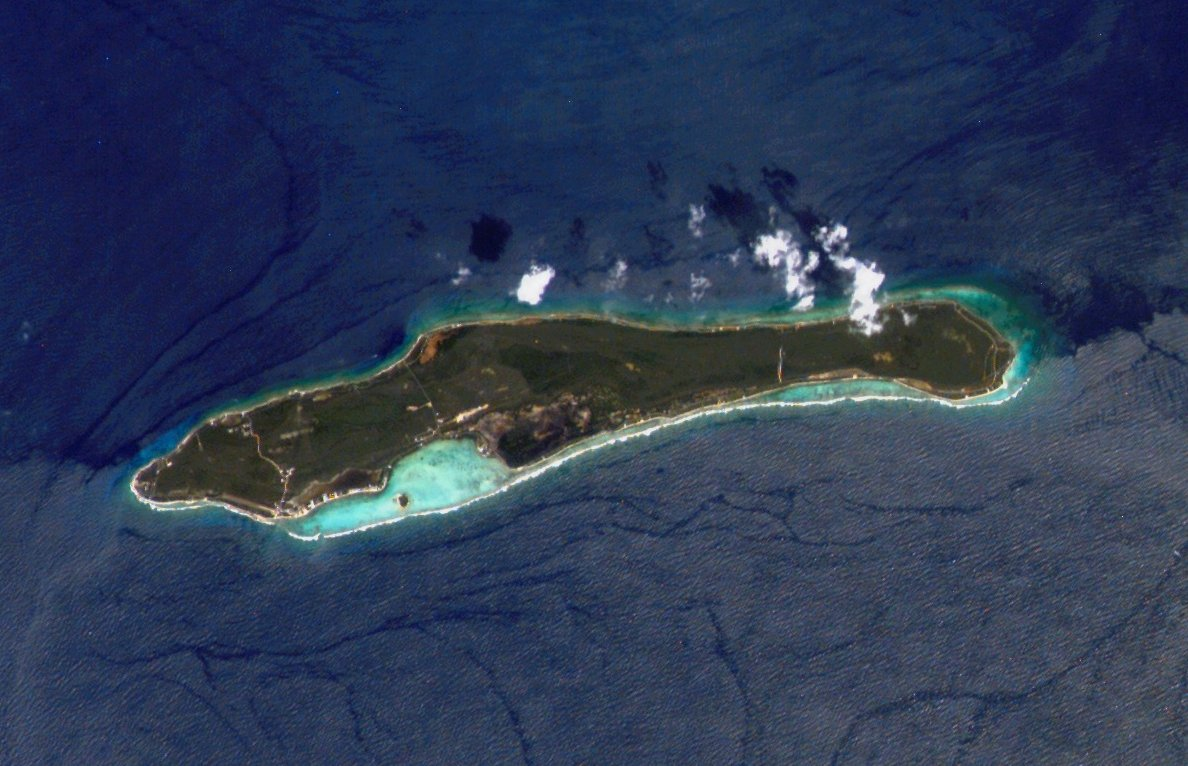
- Little Cayman from space, 3 March 2007

- Location within Cayman Islands Location within the Caribbean

Geography
- Location: Caribbean
- Coordinates: 19°41′N 80°03′W
- Archipelago: Greater Antilles

Administration
- United Kingdom
- Territory: Cayman Islands
- Largest settlement: Blossom Village

Demographics
- Population: 161 (2021)

Little Cayman is one of three islands that make up the Cayman Islands. It is located in the Caribbean Sea, approximately 60 miles (96 km) northeast of East End, Grand Cayman and five miles (8 km) west of West End, Cayman Brac. Little Cayman is the least populous island of the three, with a permanent population of about 160 (2021) including seasonal residents/homeowners. The majority of the population are expatriate workers from Jamaica, the Philippines, and Honduras and other Latin American countries, as well as Canada, the USA, India, Australia, Scotland, England, and South Africa. There are a handful of local Caymanians, with the local population estimated as fewer than 20. The island is about 10 miles (16 km) long with an average width of 1 mile (1600 m). Most of the island is undeveloped. Almost the entire island is at sea level. The highest elevation is about 40 feet (12 metres). The rainy season, which consists of mostly light showers, occurs in mid-April until June and again in mid-September to mid-October. There will be occasional quick rain showers in the early morning hours. The coolest months are from end of November until mid-March as the cold fronts from the north can drop the temperature into the low 70s°F. The hottest and driest months are in summer, starting mid-June and lasting until mid-September with temperatures between the mid-80s°F to high 90s°F. There are no large, predatory, or venomous animals that pose a threat to humans on the island.

Despite its small size, the island hosts a heritage festival and parade as part of Pirates Week in November and the annual LC Agriculture Show in May. The LC Agriculture Show occurs on all three Cayman Islands, on different days in the same month.

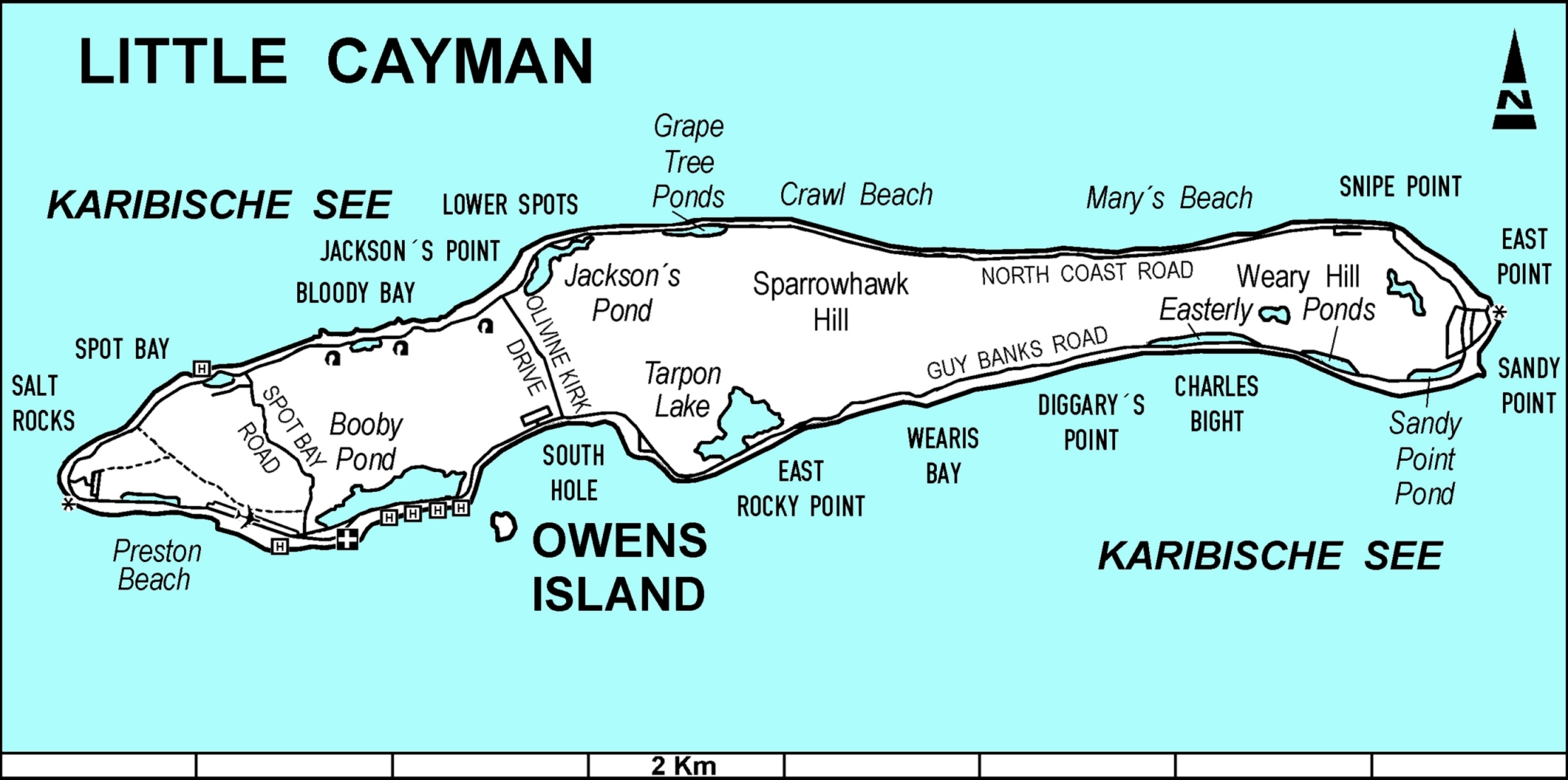
Little Cayman map

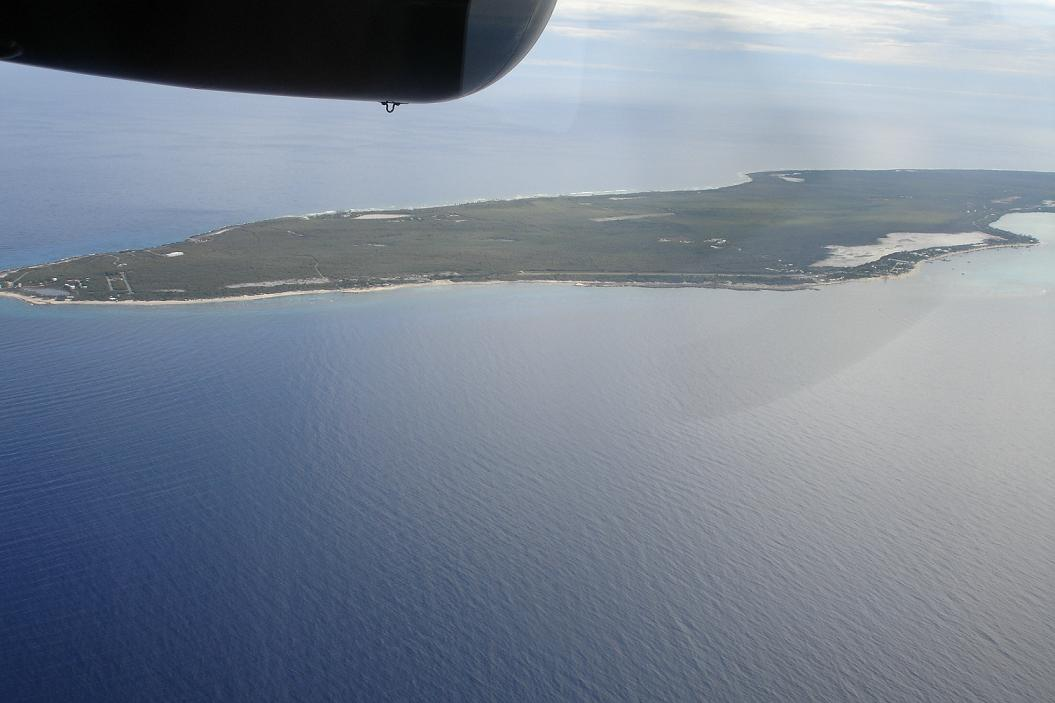
Little Cayman from the air

== History ==
The first recorded sighting of Little Cayman, along with Cayman Brac, was by Christopher Columbus on May 10, 1503, on his fourth and final voyage, when heavy winds forced his ship off course. Columbus had found the two smaller sister islands (Cayman Brac and Little Cayman) and it was these two islands that he named "Las Tortugas".

The first settlement on the Island was in the 17th century when turtle fishermen set up camps that would supply pirate and military ship convoys with fresh meat (turtles, penned pigs, goats, poultry) and freshwater. There are freshwater springs that run underground in cavernous veins. After a raid by a Spanish privateer, these settlements were abandoned in 1671. The island was not resettled until 1833, when the second recorded settlement of Blossom Village was established by a few families, mostly with the surname Bawden or Bodden, Scotts, Ryan, and Ritch, who is said to have been part of Cromwell's army in Jamaica. By the early 20th century, a few hundred people (400 adults and children) lived on Little Cayman and sustained a living from and exported phosphate ore, coconuts, and marine rope made from the Cayman Islands national tree the Silver Thatch. There were also a few schooners being built by the Bodden family. While the first settlement and harbour were on the northside coastline in the area off of the "Bloody Bay Wall", Blossom Village was the second settlement in the early 1800s on the southside, on "South Hole Sound", and is where the school, stores, post office, park, and the back sandy road are located today.

After the 1932 hurricane which claimed scores of lives on the Brac and Little Cayman, many families decided to move to Cayman Brac. The South Hole Sound waters were also a lot deeper back then.

== Attractions ==
=== Scuba Diving ===
Little Cayman is famous for its scuba diving. The most popular dive site areas, Bloody Bay and Jackson's Bight, are both located on the north side of the island, just west of its midpoint. The deeper sites on its south side are generally visited on winter days when the north side is too rough. Little Cayman features dive sites as shallow as 20 feet (6.1 m) and its walls are deep enough to be effectively infinite.

Bloody Bay, in particular, is consistently ranked as one of the world's top dive sites. Many dive operations claim the late Philippe Cousteau declared its wall to be one of the three best dives in the world, although this story may be fanciful. At its shallowest point, the drop-off begins at a depth of 18 feet (5.5 m), allowing divers who plan carefully to achieve a maximum depth of over 100 feet (30.5 m) but still enjoy exceptionally long dive times. But the wall is so famous primarily because sections of it are so sheer as to be effectively vertical, a rarity.

The most vertical section of the wall (the dive site "Great Wall West") was immortalized in 1999 by the Bloody Bay Wall Mural Project. A crew of photographers directed by Jim Hellemn photographed the wall piece by piece and the images were compiled into a single, highly detailed image of the entire wall. The photograph was reproduced in National Geographic magazine in 2001. In 2010, photographers returned to the same section of the wall in an effort to create a comparison image showing changes over the intervening decade.

The depth of Little Cayman's drop-offs is often exaggerated by local divemasters claiming depths of 3,000 feet (910 m) or 5,000 feet (1,500 m). In truth, the 1000 m contour (3000+ ft) has been charted to be approximately one mile (1600 m) offshore on Little Cayman's Southside, and 2.5 miles (4.0 km) offshore of Bloody Bay on the island's Northside (Ibid), distances far beyond the areas dived by recreational divers.

The coral reefs of Little Cayman support a diverse population of marine life, including sea horses,sharks, green turtles,southern stingrays and spotted eagle rays.

In 2010, local dive operators launched a concerted effort to eradicate the invasive, non-indigenous red lionfish (Pterois volitans), which appears to be limiting its population around Little Cayman. On Wednesday afternoons, divemasters from the various resorts on Little Cayman embark on a hunt for lionfish to cull the species. Since the hunts began, more grey Caribbean reef sharks (Carcharhinus perezii) are noticeable on dives. The lionfish are then sent to CCMI for research and after will be given out to restaurants to offer as a daily special.

=== Booby Pond and Rookery(Little Cayman National Trust) ===
Little Cayman's Booby Pond Nature Reserve supports the largest red-footed booby population in the Caribbean and is a designated Ramsar wetland of international importance. The site encompasses 82 hectares (200 acres). The Cayman Islands National Trust building on one edge of the pond offers two view decks with telescopes, and the building itself is open for a couple of hours on weekday afternoons. It contains exhibits about Little Cayman's flora and fauna as well as souvenirs. There is no entrance fee and donations are gladly accepted.

=== Fauna ===
Little Cayman has the only substantial population (estimated at 2,000) of the critically endangered Lesser Caymans iguana. Predation by feral cats, encroachment by humans into their habitat, and road deaths have reduced their population on Cayman Brac to less than 100. Rock iguanas are easy to spot on Little Cayman and the National Trust unveiled a boardwalk in December 2013 that allows visitors to view one of their nesting areas. There are no blue iguanas found on Little Cayman, as they are only found in the eastern areas of Grand Cayman. There are "iguana warning, slow down" signs to alert drivers to be cautious driving in certain areas where iguanas like to sun out on the road. The speed limit on Little Cayman is 25 mph (40 km/h).

Little Cayman hosts the critically endangered hawksbill sea turtle, and the threatened West Indian whistling duck (Dendrocygna arborea), also known as the black-billed whistling duck.

Tarpon Lake, a salt pond near the center of the island, boasts an unusual population of landlocked tarpon, a large silver fish that usually lives only in the ocean.

=== Owen Island ===
"Owen's Island" or "The Key" is a small islet off the south-western coast of Little Cayman, approximately 1000 ft (300m) from the nearest point on Little Cayman. Cayman's 4th island is rumoured to be named after a sailor named Owen who was on a ship named the "Sparrow Hawk" which anchored nearby multiple times and he always would visit the key declaring that it was his personal private island. The islet features no buildings, homes, or human habitation, and is a popular day trip for families, honeymooners and adventurers. On the side nearest to Little Cayman, it has a white shallow sand bar which is suitable for children, swimming, and snorkeling. Owen's Island is privately owned and the owners allow public use with the expectation in respect & maintaining cleanliness when visiting. To visit Owen Island, travelers typically cross South Hole Sound lagoon by small boat (or by water taxi) from a nearby Little Cayman resort. On calm days, some may opt to use a kayak or standup paddleboard (available for rent at some resorts) and a few have even been known to swim/wade/snorkel the 300m out from the nearest point.

=== Point of Sand ===
Little Cayman has several rocky beaches that are used for walking, shore diving and snorkeling. Point of Sand, located at the northeastern tip of the island, is characterized by a sandy beach, a sandy seabed, and a protective reef. The area is also known for strong currents. although the shallow section can be used for wading with appropriate caution. Point of Sand provides views of the western end of Cayman Brac, approximately five miles (8km) away. The beach is also visited by residents and visitors from Cayman Brac, who may travel there by boat. It tends to be more frequently used by local families on Sunday and less frequently on weekdays. Facilities at the beach include a shelter, picnic table and barbecue. There are no permanent water supplies or other visitors services at the site. The beach can be reached by minibus, rental car or scooter, while bicycles can also be used by visitors able to make the journey.

=== Little Cayman Museum ===
A small collection focusing on local history is open for a few hours, usually weekday afternoons, which has no admission fees and therefore relies on donations to stay open. The staff are reportedly knowledgeable on local nature.

=== Little Cayman Research Centre (Central Caribbean Marine Institute) ===
Central Caribbean Research Centre is 6,600 square foot in size, located on the north side of Little Cayman and is a part of the Central Caribbean Marine Institute (CCMI). CCMI is a not-for-profit organization founded in 1998 to protect the future of coral reefs through research, conservation, and education.

== Accessibility and Services ==
Little Cayman is accessible by air (via Cayman Airways) via daily inter-island flights from both Cayman Brac and Grand Cayman. Its only airport, Edward Bodden Airfield is on the southwest tip of the island. Little Cayman is not an entry point to the country; visitors and residents must land first on Grand Cayman (Owen Roberts International Airport) or Cayman Brac (Charles Kirkconnell International Airport) which are international airports. Sea vessels must also call into port with CBC (Immigration and Customs) either on Grand Cayman or Cayman Brac only if planning to anchor off any of the designated moorings on the North and South coasts of Little Cayman. Many moorings are for the use of the dive boats only and a maximum of four hours.

Little Cayman has one grocery-and-hardware store, one online grocery delivery store, one liquor store, one bank (CNB opens on Mondays and Thursdays) a 24hr ATM with CI$ and US$ cash, three full-service restaurants, and one local food delivery service, two churches, two-car rental operations, and also an 11 seater mini-bus with transport/taxi service which offers pick up and drop off to beaches, bars, restaurants, and the airport as well as land tours and food delivery.

There are four small souvenir/resort wear shops. It is served by the Edward Bodden Airfield, a two-man police force, a five-man fire crew with one truck and rescue boat, a full-time postmaster, a power station operated by Cayman Brac Power and Light, a clinic staffed by two nurses, and a one-room school whose enrollment is usually in single digits. Cellular phone service offered by LIME and Digicel has almost completely eliminated reliance on landlines, which many residents maintain primarily to allow them to connect to the Internet, which can only be accessed by ADSL. There are certain areas on the North East side that get no reception. The water is safe to drink as all resorts have reverse osmosis desalination for drinking, bathing, and cooking. Cistern or spring water is used for other dwellings and buildings. There is no shortage of potable drinking water. There is a weekly food supply by sea or air, electricity (110V), fuel (gas CI$6.05 and diesel at CI$6.11 an imperial gallon), and propane gas.

Little Cayman Education Services is the sole educational provider on the island.

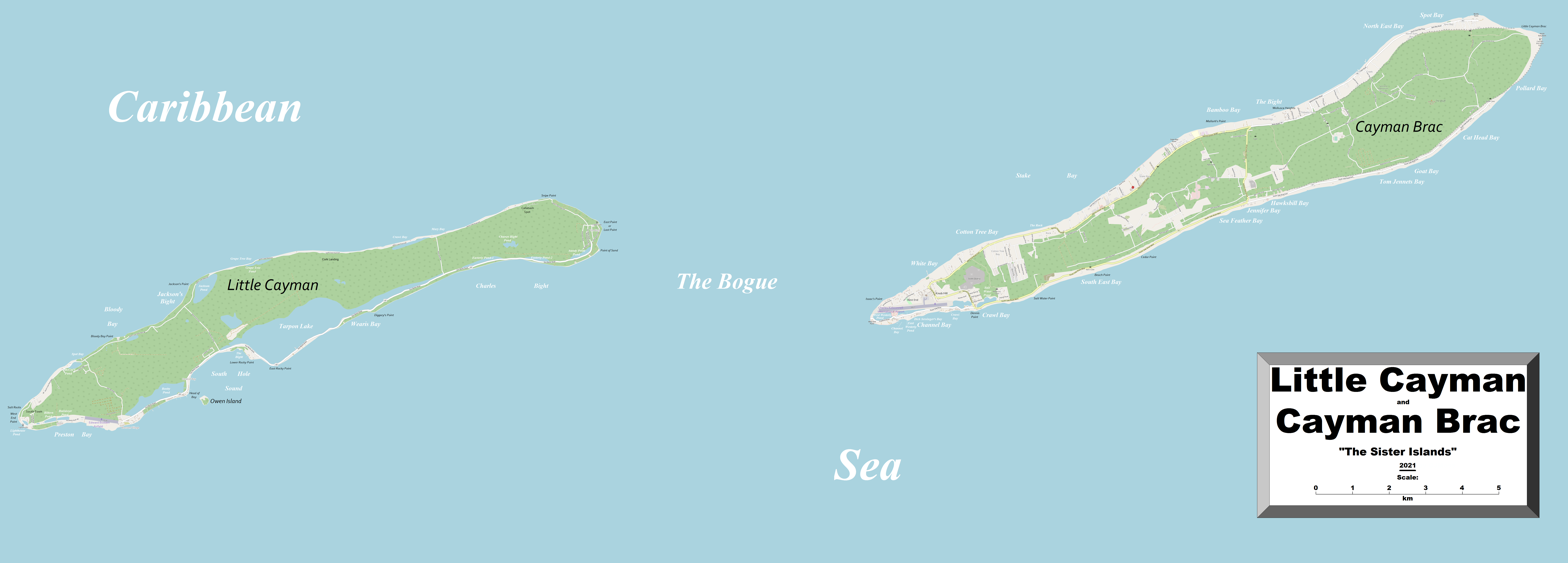
Enlargeable, detailed map of Little Cayman and Cayman Brac
