= Cayman Brac =

Caribbean island, part of the Cayman Islands

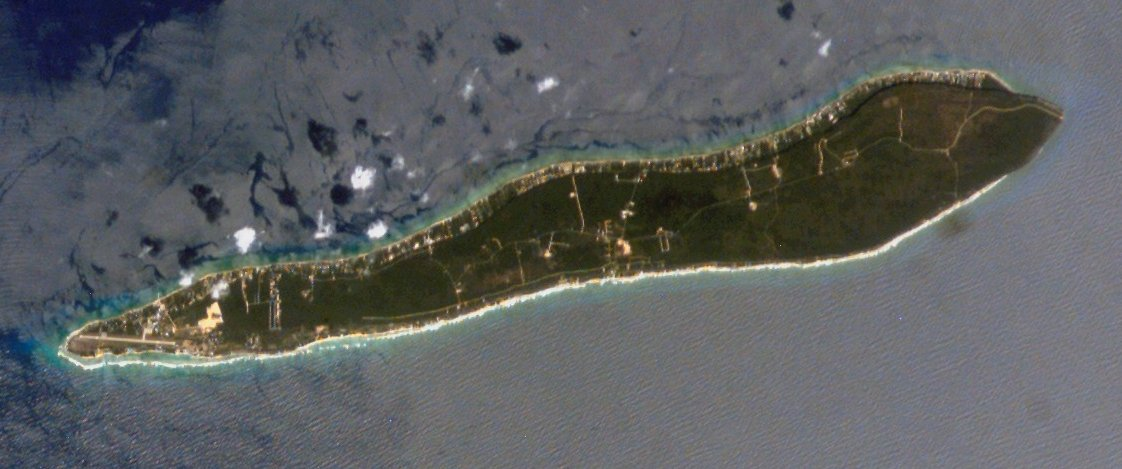
- Cayman Brac from space, 3 March 2007

- Location within Cayman Islands Location within the Caribbean

Geography
- Location: Caribbean
- Coordinates: 19°43′12″N 79°48′00″W
- Archipelago: Greater Antilles

Administration
- United Kingdom
- Territory: Cayman Islands
- Largest settlement: West End

Demographics
- Population: 1995 (2021)

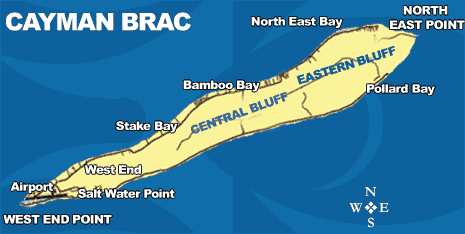
Cayman Brac map.

Cayman Brac is an island that is part of the Cayman Islands. It lies in the Caribbean Sea about 145 km (90 mi) north-east of Grand Cayman and 8 km (5.0 mi) east of Little Cayman. It is about 19 km (12 mi) long, with an average width of 2 km (1.2 mi). Its terrain is the most prominent of the three Cayman Islands due to "The Bluff", a limestone outcrop that rises steadily along the length of the island up to 43 m (141 ft) above sea level at the eastern end. The island is named after this prominent feature, as "brac" is a Gaelic name for a bluff.

== History ==
Christopher Columbus sighted Cayman Brac and its sister island, Little Cayman, on 10 May 1503 when his ship was blown off course during a trip between Hispaniola and Panama. He named them "Las Tortugas" because of the many turtles he spotted on the islands. The Cayman Islands were renamed by Sir Francis Drake, who came upon the islands during a voyage in 1586. He used the word "Caymanas", taken from the Carib name for crocodiles after seeing many of the large crocodilians. Many people believe he had only seen the rock iguanas that inhabit the island today.

During the heyday of piracy, pirates would use Cayman Brac as a haven and a place to replenish their supplies as there are a number of fresh water wells on the island and had many sources of food included in the local flora and fauna.

== Attractions ==
=== Diving ===
Of interest to scuba divers is a 100 m (330 ft) Russian Koni class frigate built in the Soviet Union in 1984 for the Cuban Navy. It is one of only a few sunken Soviet naval vessels in the Western Hemisphere, and the only one that is easily dived. The Koni II class frigate was purchased and sunk by the Cayman Islands government in September 1996. Originally designated 356, the frigate was rechristened the M/V Captain Keith Tibbetts, after a well-known Cayman Brac politician. The wreck is the only Russian warship that divers can explore in the Western hemisphere. It originally sat upright at a depth of 27 m (89 ft) with the deck at 18 m (59 ft), until wave action generated by a winter Norwester storm (December 1998 – January 1999) which nearly tore the ship in two. The result was that the fore section tipped to about a 45-degree angle in relation to the remainder of the still-upright aft portion. and the midships became a debris field. The wreck's stern area was essentially unaffected. The frigate is located in a sandy area with generally good visibility, 200 m (660 ft) offshore (a fairly long swim) from 'Buccaneer', on the island's north side, near the western tip of the island. There are numerous openings in the upper portion of the ship for non-wreck certified divers. Many more openings are available since the ship broke in half. The site also serves as an artificial reef. Other interesting dive sites are Radar Reef, Cemetery Wall, and the Wilderness Wall, all well covered in corals and with a wide diversity of marine life.

=== Caves ===
Cayman Brac also appeals to visitors of many persuasions besides divers. Caves are found around the island, offering spelunkers a glimpse of delicate underground formations. Steps and, in some cases, ladders have been constructed to allow visitor access to more remote caves. One cave, Rebecca's Cave, contains the grave of a young girl lost in a struggle against the ravages of the great 1932 Cuba hurricane, and it is a Cayman National Heritage Site.

=== Rock climbing ===
Rock climbing was developed beginning in 1992 and the island now contains about 100 sport climbs. Trad and multipitch climbs are rare.

=== Walking and hiking trails ===
Walking and hiking trails have been opened by the Nature Tourism Programme which allow exploration of the island's densely forested karst landscapes. Unique flora and fauna thrive here and can be observed in the wild. Some trails can be found in the National Trust's Parrot Reserve, at the Brac Lighthouse on the eastern side of the island, or at the Christopher Columbus Gardens.

=== Fishing ===
Cayman Brac's waters are utilized for both recreational fishing and the pursuit of big game fish.

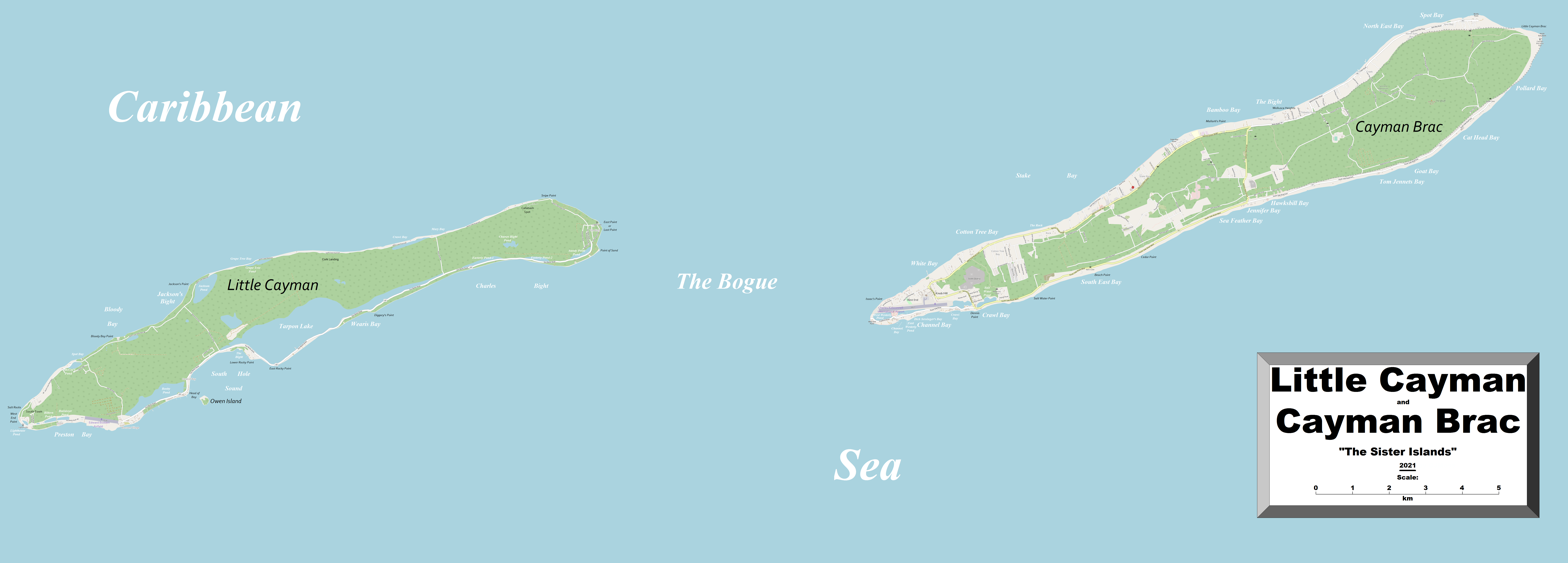
Enlargeable, detailed map of Little Cayman and Cayman Brac

=== Flora and fauna ===
Cayman brac is home to many unique and endemic species of plants and animals, including the Cayman Brac Parrot (Amazona leucocephala hesterna), the Cayman Brac Racer snake (Cubophis fuscicauda), and an endemic crownbeard plant (Verbesina caymanensis). It is rich in biodiversity compared to its size, with 14 species of native reptiles and amphibians, over 80 native birds, 150+ species of plants, and over 150 species of fish in its rich tropical waters.

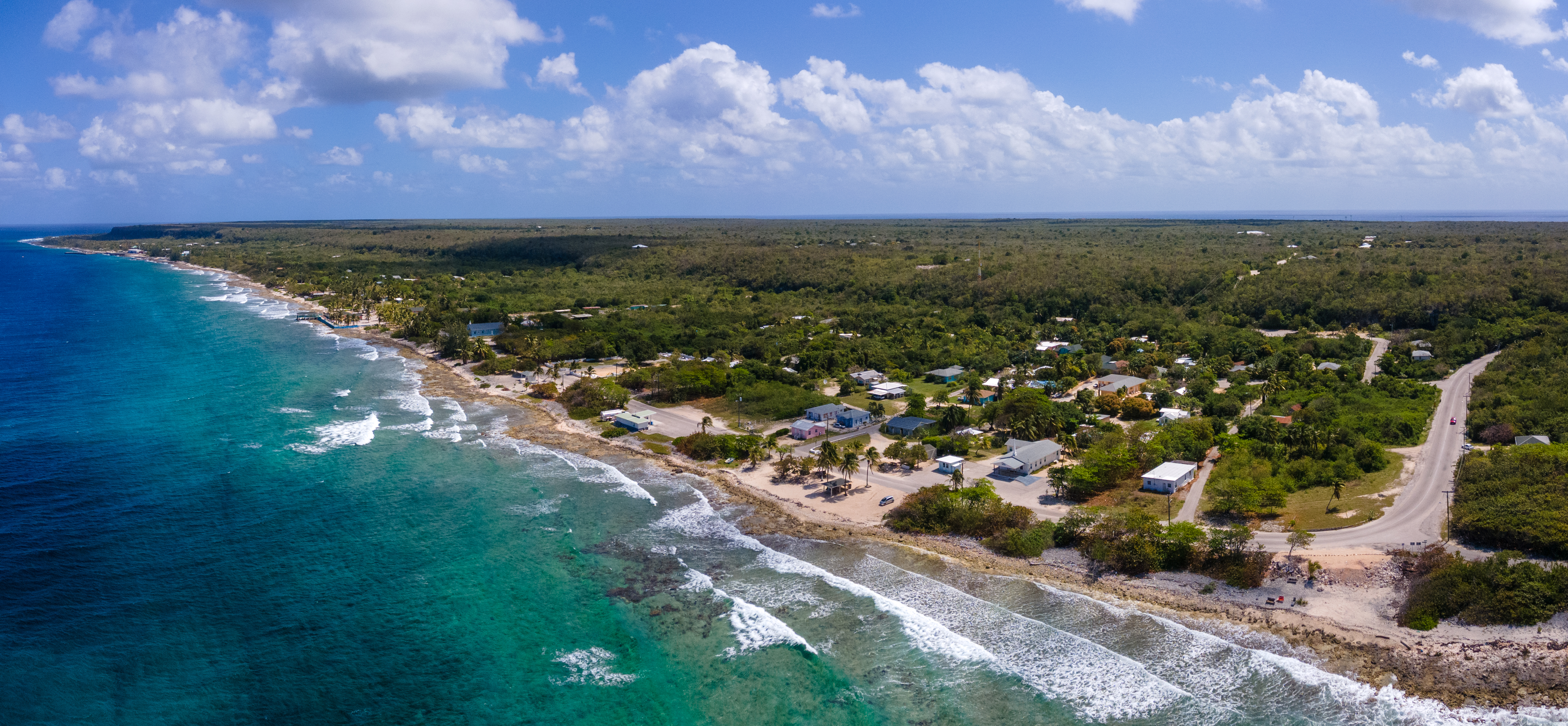
Aerial of the north side of Cayman Brac.

== Politics ==
The politics of Cayman Brac are dominated by the liberal People’s Progressive Movement, who won every electoral district in both the Brac and Little Cayman.

== Local economy ==
The local economy tends to be concentrated in three areas which are probably typical for many Caribbean locales: tourism, municipal government, and local enterprises. Although on the Brac, the government (including Cayman Airways, the national carrier) is the largest employer. Some of the more economically prominent families in Grand Cayman originate from Cayman Brac, namely the Kirkconnells, Fosters, Tibbetts, and Scotts. The majority of the tourism sector is concentrated on scuba diving, although this is in recent decline in the hospitality sector, with one of the two local hotels, Divi Resorts, having closed operations in 2006. The island's economy was also adversely affected by significant damage from Category 4 Hurricane Paloma in November 2008.

A local enterprise that is nearly unique to Cayman Brac is its artists who work in a local stone known as caymanite, typically making jewellery or small stone carvings. Two of these artists have been Eddie Scott and Tenson Scott, whose works have won national contests, as well as being the official gift to Queen Elizabeth II and Prince Philip during the 1994 state visit. For the 2011 wedding of Prince William, the official Cayman Islands gift was crafted by Horacio Esteban, who grew up on Cayman Brac and is currently living on Grand Cayman.

== Current airline service ==
Charles Kirkconnell International Airport (formerly known as Gerrard Smith International Airport) serves the island. All scheduled passenger flights are operated by Cayman Airways and subsidiary Cayman Airways Express with service to and from Grand Cayman being flown with Saab 340B regional turboprops and also small de Havilland Canada DHC-6 Twin Otter turboprop aircraft with limited flights also being operated on this interisland route with Boeing 737 MAX 8 jetliners. In addition, Cayman Airways provides limited 737-8 jet service from Cayman Brac to Miami via a stop in Grand Cayman and also operates weekly nonstop 737-8 service southbound one way from Miami. According to the Cayman Airways flight schedule, the airline is also currently operating direct no change of plane 737-8 jet service every Saturday from Cayman Brac to Denver via a stop in Grand Cayman.

== Historical airline service ==
In 1965, Cayman Brac Airways (CBA), a subsidiary of LACSA Airlines, was operating twice weekly round trip service flown with a Beech Model 18 twin prop aircraft on a routing of Grand Cayman - Little Cayman - Cayman Brac - Montego Bay. According to the airline's 1 May 1965, timetable, connecting service to Miami via Grand Cayman was offered by LACSA, an airline based in Costa Rica, while additional connecting service to Miami as well as to New York City was offered by Pan Am via Montego Bay. In 1968, the government of the Cayman Islands purchased a controlling interest in Cayman Brac Airways from LACSA and then formed Cayman Airways which has served the airport since that time.

== Education ==
The Cayman Islands Education Department operates two primary schools and one secondary school on the island. These include:

- Creek & Spot Bay Primary School (Infant school and Junior School)
- West End Primary School
- Layman E. Scott Sr. High School
