= List of radio stations in the Cayman Islands =

There are presently 16 licensed radio stations in the Cayman Islands authorized by the Information and Communication Technology Authority, or ICTA.

== Radio stations on Grand Cayman ==
- 87.9 FM ZFKP-FM - Praise 87.9 - OWNER: C.I. Conference of Seventh-Day Adventists
- 89.9 FM ZFKC-FM - Radio Cayman - OWNER: Government
- 91.5 FM Magic FM - OWNER: Stingray Media
- 92.7 FM ZFST-FM - Star 92.7 - OWNER: Interactive Broadcasting & Media Ltd
- 93.5 FM CayCountry - OWNER: Stingray Media
- 94.9 FM ZFBB-FM - 94.9 GOLD - OWNER: Compass Media
- 95.5 FM ZFKO-FM - Big Fish Radio - OWNER: Big Fish Radio
- 96.5 FM ZFKS-FM - 96.5 CayRock - OWNER: Stingray Media
- 97.7 FM ZFHE-FM - The Voice 97.7 - OWNER: Spread The Word Ministries
- 98.9 FM ZFIR-FM - Island FM - OWNER: Compass Media
- 99.9 FM ZFZZ-FM - Z99 - OWNER: Compass Media
- 101.1 FM ZFKI-FM - ICCI-FM - OWNER: International College of the Cayman Islands
- 101.9 FM ZFKY-FM - Rooster 101.9 - Compass Media
- 103.1 FM Bobo 103.1 FM - OWNER: Stingray Media
- 104.1 FM ZFKH-FM - Hot 104.1 - OWNER: Stingray Media
- 105.3 FM ZFKZ-FM - Breeze FM (aka "Radio Cayman 2") - OWNER: Government
- 106.1 FM ZFKK-FM - 106.1 Kiss FM - OWNER: Stingray Media
- 107.1 FM ZFKX-FM - X107.1 - OWNER: Stingray Media
- 107.9 FM ZFGT-FM - Sunny 107.9 Weather Radio - OWNER: Government

=== Defunct stations ===
- 88.7 FM ZFKG-FM - Gospel 88 - OWNER: Christian Communications Association
- 94.3 FM ZFKW-FM - WestPoint Radio - OWNER: WestPoint Radio & Family Chapel Ltd.
- 94.9 FM BOB FM - OWNER: Hurley's Media
- 95.5 FM Ocean FM - OWNER: Cerentis Broadcasting Systems
- 96.5 FM Style 96.5 (evolved into today's ZFKS-FM 96.5 Cay Rock)
- 103.1 FM ZFLV-FM - Love FM - OWNER: Cayman Broadcasting Ltd.

== Radio stations on Cayman Brac ==
- 91.9 FM ZFBZ-FM - Breeze FM (Radio Cayman 2) - OWNER: Government
- 93.9 FM ZFKB-FM - Radio Cayman 1 - OWNER: Government
- 94.9 FM ZFBB-FM - 94.9 GOLD - OWNER: Compass Media
- 98.9 FM ZFIR-FM - Island FM - OWNER: Compass Media
- 99.9 FM ZFZZ-FM - Z99 - OWNER: Compass Media
- 101.9 FM ZFKY-FM - Rooster 101.9 - Compass Media

== Radio stations on Little Cayman ==
- 91.9 FM ZFBZ-FM - Breeze FM (Radio Cayman 2) - OWNER: Government
- 93.9 FM ZFKB-FM - Radio Cayman 1 - OWNER: Government
- 94.9 FM ZFBB-FM - 94.9 GOLD - OWNER: Compass Media
- 98.9 FM ZFIR-FM - Island FM - OWNER: Compass Media
- 99.9 FM ZFZZ-FM - Z99 - OWNER: Compass Media
- 101.9 FM ZFKY-FM - Rooster 101.9 - Compass Media

== See also ==
- Cayman Islands
- British West Indies
