= 87.9 FM =

FM radio frequency

The following radio stations broadcast on FM frequency 87.9 MHz:

== Argentina ==
- Acción in Coronel Belisle, Río Negro
- Catedral in Salta
- Ciudad in Trelew, Chubut
- Ciudad in San Miguel de Tucumán, Tucumán
- LRS886 Comunal in Sa Pereira, Santa Fe
- LRS908 in Sastre, Santa Fe
- De la Calle in Bahía Blanca, Buenos Aires
- Del Rosario in La Toma, San Luis
- Ecosur in La Cocha, Tucumán
- Estación Palpalá in Palpalá, Jujuy
- JTA in Mendoza
- Laguna in San Miguel del Monte
- LRM879 in Santa Fe
- Municipal in Villa Gesell, Buenos Aires
- Municipal in Monte Cristo, Córdoba
- Municipal in General San Martín, La Pampa
- Municipal in Florencio Varela, Buenos Aires
- Municipal in Navarro, Buenos Aires
- Municipal in Caleta Olivia, Santa Cruz
- Municipal in Villa Angela, Chaco
- Municipal in Monteros, Tucumán
- Municipal in Maciá, Entre Ríos
- Municipal in Castelli, Buenos Aires
- Municipal in Ullum, San Juan
- Nativa in Ministro Ramos Mexia, Buenos Aires
- Publica in Plottier, Neuquén
- Resistencia in Resistencia, Chaco
- UBA in Buenos Aires
- UNViMe in Villa Mercedes, San Luis
- Urbana in Lamarque, Río Negro
- Uruguay in Rosario, Santa Fe
- Via libre in María Teresa, Santa Fe

== Australia ==
- Kiss FM Australia in Melbourne, Victoria

== Brazil ==
In Brazil, the frequency 87.9 FM is reserved for community radio stations. These stations have power limited to up to 25 watts and coverage limited to a radius of up to 1 km.

== Canada ==
- RPR in Tyendinaga Mohawk Territory, Ontario

== Cayman Islands ==
- ZFKP-FM at Georgetown

== China ==
- CRI Hit FM in Shanghai

== Finland ==
- Yle Radio 1 in Espoo and Ylitornio
- Kiss FM in Joensuu
- Järviradio in Pihtipudas
- Radio Kajaus in Suomossalmi

== Germany ==
- Star FM at Berlin

== Italy ==
- Radio Onda Rossa in Rome

== Malaysia ==
- Fly FM in Ipoh, Perak
- Minnal FM in Kuala Terengganu, Terengganu
- Radio Klasik in Seremban, Negeri Sembilan

== Morocco ==
- SNRT-Agadir at Agadir

== New Zealand ==
- Various low-power stations up to 1 watt

== Nigeria ==
- Best Afro FM, Abeokuta
- Best Afro FM, Abuja
- Best Afro FM, Lagos

== Palau ==
- T8AA-FM at Koror

== Philippines ==
- Radyo Katipunan in Quezon City
- DWBC-FM in Biñan, Laguna
- Flash FM in Naga City
- K5 News FM in Guihulngan City, Negros Oriental
- Republika Ni Juan Davao in Davao City
- Juander Radyo in General Santos City
- DXRT in Pagadian City

== United States (Channel 200) ==
In 1945, the standard FM broadcasting band was assigned to channels that started at 88.1 MHz. 87.9 MHz was added in 1978, as part of a project to improve use of the non-commercial channels of 88.1 to 91.9 MHz. 87.9 MHz was designated as a potential assignment for existing 10-watt "Class D" stations that were unable to increase their power to at least 100 watts, and also could not be moved to the adjoining commercial channels of 92.1 to 107.9 MHz. Because 87.9 is also part of TV Channel 6 in the United States, its use by radio is restricted to low-power stations meeting certain strict criteria, licensed for operation on FM Channel 200.

There are no radio stations on 87.9 MHz in the United States since KSFH's license was canceled in December 2021; there is one translator licensed to the frequency. The station is K200AA in Sun Valley, Nevada, a translator of CSN International. The translator was granted a special grant by the FCC to move from 88.1 MHz to 87.9 MHz to protect KYSA in Sparks, Nevada, which is on 88.3 MHz.
