= Tyendinaga =

Tyendinaga is an alternate spelling of Thayendanegea, an eighteenth-century Mohawk chief also known as Joseph Brant.

Tyendinaga may also refer to:

- Tyendinaga Mohawk Territory, a First Nations reserve on the Bay of Quinte
  - Mohawks of the Bay of Quinte First Nation, the First Nation government that governs that reserve
  - Tyendinaga (Mohawk) Airport, located on that reserve
- Tyendinaga, Ontario, a township in Ontario
