= Mediabase =

Radio station monitoring service

- Type: Private
- Industry: Media market (research)
- Founded: 1985; 41 years ago
- Founders: Rich Deitemeyer (aka, Rich Meyer), Nancy Deitemeyer
- Headquarters: White Plains, New York, United States
- Area served: North America
- Key people: Philippe Generali, Nancy Deitemeyer
- Products: Music airplay data
- Parent: iHeartMedia
- Website: www.mediabase.com

Mediabase is a music industry service that monitors radio station airplay in 180 US and Canadian markets. Mediabase publishes music charts and data based on the most played songs on terrestrial and satellite radio, and provides in-depth analytical tools for radio and record industry professionals. Mediabase charts and airplay data are used on many popular radio countdown shows and televised music awards programs. Music charts are published in both domestic and international trade publications and newspapers worldwide. Mediabase is a division of iHeartMedia.

== History ==
Mediabase was founded in 1985 by Nancy and Rich Deitemeyer (a.k.a. Rich Meyer). Originally known as Mediascan, the company changed its name to Mediabase in 1987. Mediabase became the industry's first mass-airplay monitoring company in late 1987. After its inception, Mediabase was purchased by a private equity group based in Detroit, Michigan, then acquired by California-based Premiere Radio Networks, Jacor Communications, Clear Channel Communications, and ultimately, Bain Capital.

In January 1988, Mediabase began publishing a trade magazine known as Monday Morning Replay, featuring monitored airplay in the top 35 US radio markets. Mediabase then expanded its coverage to 180 US and Canadian markets. In 1992, Mediabase transitioned to delivery by data disk. In 1997, Mediabase moved its product to the Internet. Over the years, Mediabase has supplied data to numerous trade business-to-business (B-to-B) publications including Radio & Records, Network Magazine Group, Gavin, Hits, and Friday Morning Quarterback. Mediabase charts appear every Friday (originally every Tuesday until during the 3rd quarter of 2015) in USA Today's LIFE section. Mediabase serves as the official music chart provider for USA Today, the American Music Awards, and numerous syndicated programs, such as American Top 40 with Ryan Seacrest.

== Charts and data ==
Mediabase produces song charts and airplay analyses of radio airplay in more than two dozen radio formats based on the monitoring of more than 1,800 radio stations in the US and Canada. Mediabase also monitors HD formats, video channels, and satellite radio.

Published charts are used on popular business-to-business (B-to-B) and consumer websites including AllAccess, Friday Morning Quarterback, Country Aircheck, and Hits Daily Double.

Music and entertainment industry executives gain access to in-depth charts and analyses through B-to-B exclusive access.

Mediabase owns and operates Rate the Music, a service that allows consumers to rate music on a scale from one to five and whether or not they are tired of hearing the song on the radio for the radio and record industries.

As of November 2022, Billboard started using Mediabase to make calculations for the Radio Songs chart, which is one of the components that is used to determine chart positions in the Hot 100 charts in the United States and Canada.

== Use in radio programming ==
=== Countdown ===
Mediabase charts are the source for the following radio countdown programs:

- American Top 40 with Ryan Seacrest (Top 40 and Hot AC shows)
- Bobby Bones Country Top 30
- Country Countdown USA with Lon Helton
- American Country Countdown with Kix Brooks (from 2009 to 2017)
- Country Top 40 with Fitz
- Crook & Chase Country Countdown
- iHeartRadio Countdown with JoJo Wright (Top 40) and Mario Lopez (Hot AC)
- Nikki Sixx Active Rock and Alternative Radio Countdowns
- SiriusXM Hits 1 Weekend Countdown
- Smooth Jazz Top 20 Countdown with Allen Kepler

=== Other ===
Mediabase is the primary programming tool for nationally syndicated programs like Open House Party, After Midnite, and Nighttime with Delilah.

== Detailed description of data ==
=== US Radio ===
==== Formats monitored ====
- Mainstream adult contemporary
- Hot adult contemporary
- Mainstream top 40
- Rhythmic top 40
- Urban top 40
- Urban adult contemporary
- Country
- Alternative rock
- Active rock
- Mainstream rock
- Adult alternative
- Rhythmic adult contemporary
- Adult hits
- Dance
- Classic rock
- Smooth jazz
- Christian top 40
- Christian adult contemporary
- Classic hits
- Gospel
- Regional Mexican
- Spanish contemporary
- Tropical
- Christmas (seasonal)

=== Canadian radio ===
- Top 40
- Hot Adult Contemporary
- Adult Contemporary
- Country
- Active Rock
- Alternative
