= DWBC =

DWBC may refer to:

- DWBC-AM (1422 AM), a defunct radio station in Metro Manila
- DWBC-FM (87.9 FM), a radio station in Biñan, Laguna known as Radyo Biñan
- DWBC-TV (channel 48), a TV station in Ilocos Sur known as GMA Ilocos Sur
