= IHeartRadio Countdown =

iHeartRadio Countdown
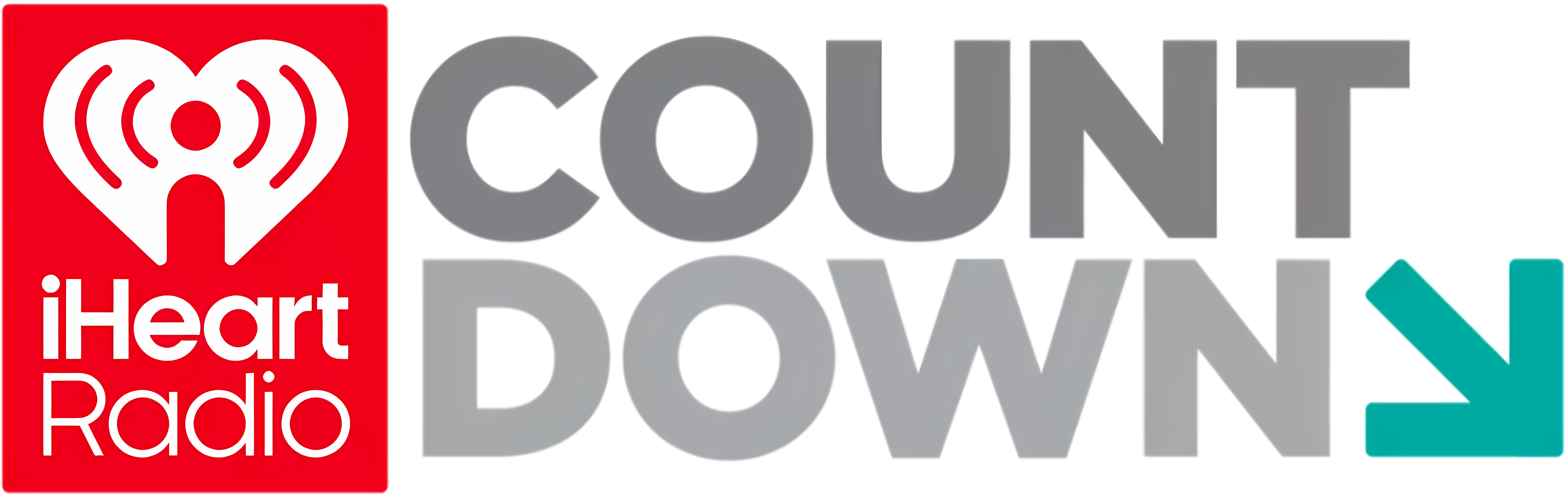
- iHeartRadio Countdown Logo.
- Genre: Music chart show, talk
- Running time: Approx. 2 hrs. (including commercials); 1 hr. + 37 min. (w/out commercials)
- Country of origin: United States
- Home station: CHR: KIIS-FM (Los Angeles); WHTZ (New York City); HOT AC: KBIG (Los Angeles); WHYN-FM (Springfield, Massachusetts)
- Syndicates: Premiere Networks, ARN, Shanghai Media Group, dms Broadcasting
- Hosted by: CHR: JoJo Wright (2018–present) Romeo (2014-2018); Hot AC: Mario Lopez (2014-present); Various guest hosts
- Created by: iHeartRadio
- Executive producers: iHeartMedia, Inc.
- Original release: January 14, 2014 – present
- Website: Official Website

iHeartRadio Countdown is a globally-syndicated, independent song countdown radio program. The countdown is based on the popular iHeartRadio, an Internet radio platform owned by iHeartMedia, Inc. (formerly Clear Channel Broadcasting, Inc.) The show premiered on January 14, 2014 on selected iHeartMedia-owned stations, and is syndicated by Premiere Networks and ARN in Australia. Internationally, the show airs on Shanghai's KFM 98.1 and the Cayman Islands' X107.1.

As of 2018, the iHeartRadio Countdown is currently aired in two editions: the CHR edition (hosted by KIIS-FM’s JoJo Wright since 2018; previously it was hosted by Romeo since its launch) and the Hot AC edition (hosted by Mario Lopez).

== Top Songs of the Year ==
On December 26, 2013, iHeartRadio launched a similar "Top Songs of the Year" which was broadcast on Clear Channel-owned CHR stations (such as Z100 New York, KIIS-FM Los Angeles, etc.) in comply to those stations' year end charts from the previous years, usually before New Year's Day. From 2014-2017, the top 100 songs were counted down, but after JoJo Wright took over as host in 2018 it was reduced to 50 songs, and in 2022 it was reduced again to 40 songs. No. 1 songs each year (beginning with the launch year, 2013) are:

- 2013: "Blurred Lines" by Robin Thicke feat. Pharrell and T.I.
- 2014: "Dark Horse" by Katy Perry feat. Juicy J
- 2015: "Uptown Funk" by Mark Ronson feat. Bruno Mars
- 2016: "Love Yourself" by Justin Bieber
- 2017: "Shape of You" by Ed Sheeran
- 2018: "Perfect" By Ed Sheeran
- 2019: "Sucker" By Jonas Brothers
- 2020: "Blinding Lights" by The Weeknd
- 2021: "Stay" by The Kid Laroi and Justin Bieber
- 2022: "As It Was" by Harry Styles
- 2023: "Cruel Summer" by Taylor Swift
- 2024: "Espresso" by Sabrina Carpenter
- 2025: "Ordinary" by Alex Warren

== International versions ==
In Australia, selected KIIS stations air the local version of the same name. But unlike the U.S. version of the chart, the top 20 songs from both international and Australian acts are aired. It is hosted by KIIS 106.5 Sydney host Kian.

In New Zealand, ZM also airs the local version of the show (entitled ZM's iHeartRadio Official Countdown), bringing the top 40 songs on the chart. The show broadcasts every Saturday from 2pm to 5pm on all ZM stations nationwide, and is hosted by Cam.

In Canada, iHeartRadio launched a similar program called "iHeartRadio Top 20", Airs Weekends on Canadian Orbyt Media Affiliated stations its hosted by Shannon Burns from Toronto.
