= Deseronto Transit =

Public transport system in Ontario, Canada

- Founded: August 2007
- Headquarters: 331 Main St., Deseronto, ON, K0K 1X0
- Service area: Deseronto
- Service type: Bus service
- Routes: 1
- Stops: 22
- Destinations: Belleville, Greater Napanee, Shannonville
- Hubs: Quinte Mall, Belleville
- Fleet: 4 Mini-Bus Vehicles
- Annual ridership: 4,745
- Operator: Town of Deseronto + Greater Napanee

Deseronto Transit was a public transit system in the Canadian town of Deseronto with connections to the towns of Belleville, Napanee and Tyendinaga. Service ran from 5AM-7PM, with no service on statutory holidays.

== History ==
Deseronto Transit was founded in 2007, providing limited service in Deseronto and Belleville.

On January 2, 2024, Deseronto Transit transitioned to a fixed route service, running from Belleville to Greater Napanee via Deseronto. Additional stops were added in Tyendinaga Mohawk Territory, in Shannonville, and throughout Greater Napanee.

All services ended on December 1, 2025.

== Connections ==
Deseronto Transit connected to Belleville Transit, in Belleville. It also indirectly connected with Quinte Transit at Quinte Mall.

== Fleet ==
Deseronto Transit utilized one 2012 GMC G4500, one 2016 Ford E-450, one 2018 Ford E-450 and one 2018 Dodge Caravan SE. The fleet was wheelchair-accessible.

== Stops ==
Deseronto Transit operated 22 stops, but curtailed service when the town of Greater Napanee withdrew its subsidy effective March 31, 2025.

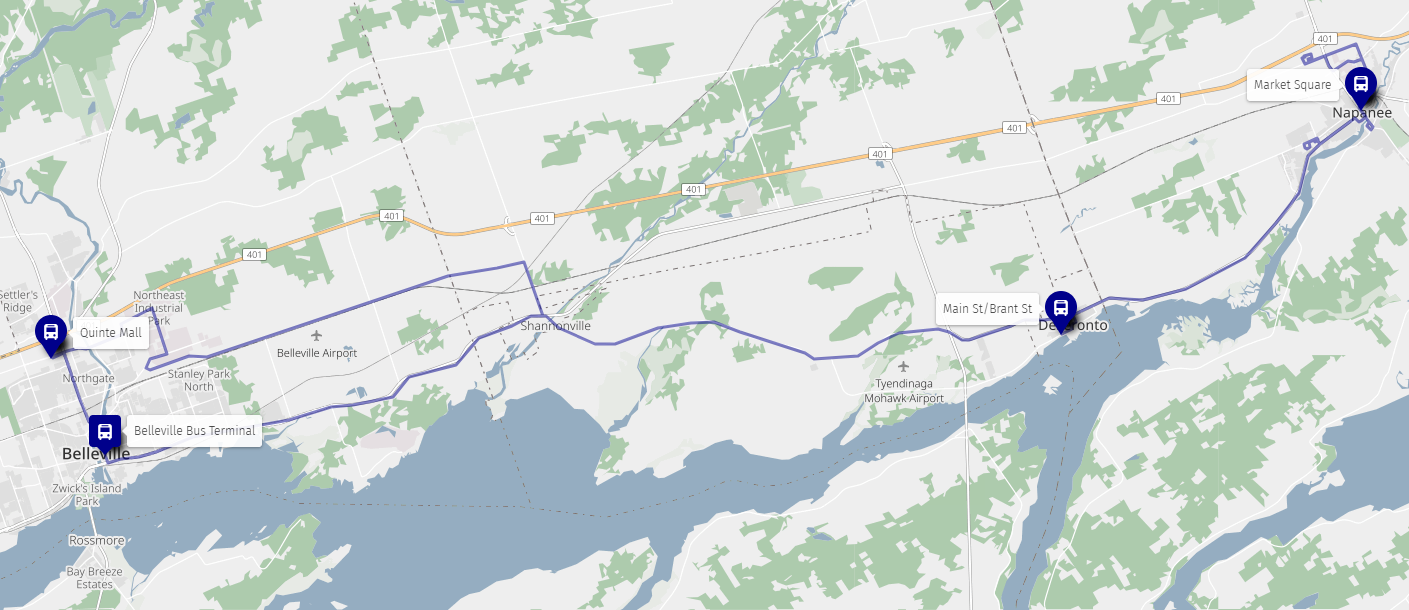
Route map, with major stops indicated
Stop Name	Town	Location
Lenadco Complex	Greater Napanee	310 Bridge Street W
Lennox and Addington Hospital	Greater Napanee	8 Richmond Park Drive
West Street at Baker Street	Greater Napanee	80 Baker Street
Rotary Park/Napanee Library	Greater Napanee	38 Pearl Street
Greater Napanee Market Square	Greater Napanee	124 John Street
Camden Variety	Greater Napanee	425 Camden Road
Chucks Roadhouse	Greater Napanee	9 Jim Kimmet Boulevard
Walmart	Greater Napanee	89 Jim Kimmet Boulevard
Strathcona Paper Centre	Greater Napanee	16 McPherson Drive
No Frills	Greater Napanee	450 Centre Street
Metro	Greater Napanee	35 Alkenbrack Street
Napanee Municipal Offices	Greater Napanee	99 Advance Avenue
49 Quick Stop	Tyendinaga	215 County Road #49
Queen Street at York Road	Tyendinaga	40 York Road
Deseronto Pentecostal Church	Deseronto	467 Dundas Street
Deseronto Fire Hall	Deseronto	315 Edmon Street
Main Street at Brant Street	Deseronto	52 Brant St
Deseronto Catholic Church	Deseronto	213 Dundas Street
Belleville Industrial Park (JBS Foods)	Belleville	240 Jamieson Bone Road
Quinte Mall - Shoppers Drug Mart	Belleville	390 North Front Street
Belleville Market Square/Bus Terminal	Belleville	169 Pinnacle Street
Belleville Hospital	Belleville	265 Dundas Street
Bayview Mall	Belleville	470 Dundas Street

== Fares ==
Deseronto Transit offered monthly passes, which were available at the Deseronto Town Hall, and several locations in the other municipalities. A one way fare for the whole route was $15, while travelling between townships and within them cost half that.
