= ZFHE-FM =

George Town; Cayman Islands
- Broadcast area: Grand Cayman, Cayman Islands
- Frequency: 97.7 MHz
- Branding: Heaven 97

Programming
- Format: Christian Contemporary

Ownership
- Owner: Christian Communications Association
- Sister stations: Gospel 88.7

History
- First air date: August 1, 1997

Technical information
- ERP: 2,000 watts
- Transmitter coordinates: 19°18′N 81°23′W

Heaven 97 (97.7 FM) was a radio station in the Cayman Islands in the British West Indies. The station was owned by Christian Communications Association. It aired a Christian Contemporary music format.

The station's final license was issued on December 4, 2003.

This station is no longer in operation.
