= Tyendinaga (Mohawk) Airport =

- IATA: none; ICAO: none; TC LID: CPU6

Summary
- Airport type: Public
- Operator: First Nations Technical Institute
- Location: Tyendinaga Mohawk Territory, Ontario
- Time zone: EST (UTC−05:00)
  - Summer (DST): EDT (UTC−04:00)
- Elevation AMSL: 260 ft / 79 m
- Coordinates: 44°11′05″N 077°06′28″W

Map
- Location in Ontario

Runways
Direction	Length		Surface
Direction	ft	m	Surface
09/27	4,270	1,301	Asphalt
15/33	2,575	785	Asphalt
- Source: Canada Flight Supplement

Tyendinaga (Mohawk) Airport (TC LID: CPU6) is a registered aerodrome that is open to the public and caters mainly to general aviation. The aerodrome is located in Tyendinaga Mohawk Territory, 3 nautical miles (5.6 km; 3.5 mi) southwest of Tyendinaga, Ontario, Canada, north of the Bay of Quinte between Kingston and Belleville.

== History ==
Originally known as Deseronto Airport, the field opened in 1917 as a training school for pilots during World War I. During World War II, it hosted the No. 1 Instrument Navigation School for the British Commonwealth Air Training Plan, providing advanced instrument-navigation training to air crews. During this time, the airport was also used as the primary relief landing field for the Central Flying School, based out of RCAF Station Trenton.

The aerodrome is currently the site of the First Nations Technical Institute and the First Peoples' Aviation Technology – Flight Training Program.

=== Historical aerodrome information ===
In approximately 1942 the aerodrome was listed as "RCAF Aerodrome - Mohawk, Ontario" at 44°11′N 77°07′W with no variation or elevation listed. The field was listed as "all hard surfaced" and had three runways listed as follows:

Runway name	Length	Width	Surface
4/22	2,500 ft (760 m)	150 ft (46 m)	Decommissioned, hard surfaced
15/33	2,575 ft (785 m)	150 ft (46 m)	Asphalt
9/27	4,270 ft (1,300 m)	150 ft (46 m)	Asphalt
