= Lee-Ann Martin =

First Nation writer and curator

- Born: Toronto, Ontario
- Citizenship: Mohawks of the Bay of Quinte and Canada
- Occupations: artist, author, curator

Lee-Ann Martin is a Mohawk art curator and writer.

== Background ==
Martin was born in Toronto, Ontario. She belongs to the Mohawks of the Bay of Quinte.

== Career ==
Martin was the Curator of Contemporary Canadian Aboriginal Art for the Canadian Museum of History. Martin was the head curator of art at the Mackenzie Art Gallery, Regina, from 1998 to 2000.

In 2018, she curated an exhibition of 150 Indigenous women artists on billboards across Canada titled Resilience with Mentoring Artists for Women's Art in Winnipeg.

== Awards and honors ==
In 2019, she was awarded a Governor General's Awards in Visual and Media Arts for her Outstanding Contribution.
