= Culbertson Tract land claim =

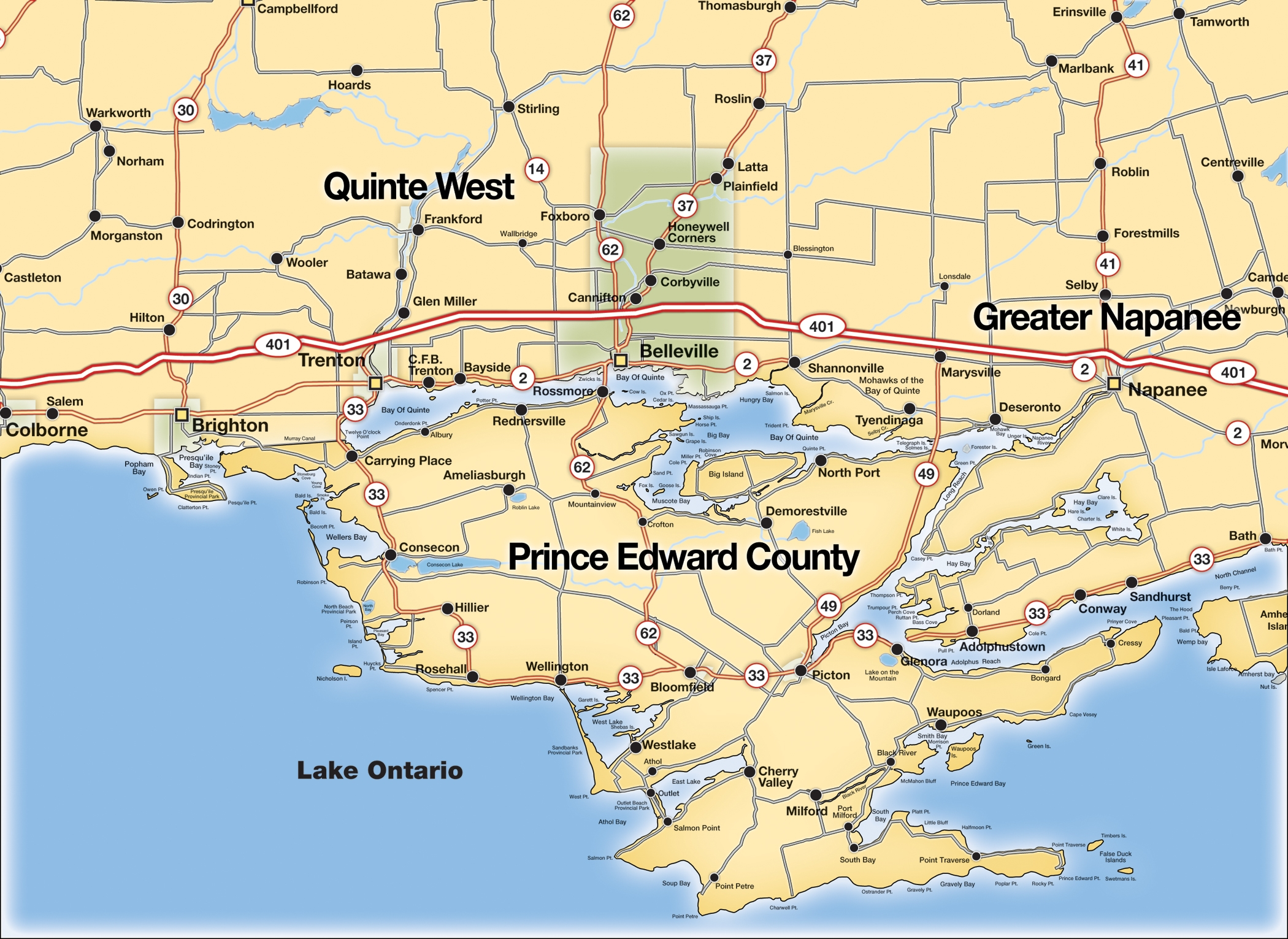
Map of the Bay of Quinte Area. The land claim covers the areas between Tyendinaga and Deseronto, Ontario.

The Culbertson Tract Land Claim, located in the Canadian Province of Ontario in Hastings County, is a specific land claim originally submitted by the Mohawks of the Bay of Quinte in 1995. It covers 923 acres surrounding the Tyendinaga area and the majority of the Deseronto township. This claim is based on the loss of over 800 acres of land during the continued loyalist settlement during 1820-1843 which proved to be the loss of the majority of the land from the Simcoe Treaty.

In 2003, the Department of Indian Affairs and Northern Development stated that the land claim would be negotiated through the Specific Claim Policy in regard to financial compensation instead of negotiating for the land itself. In 2013, after ten years of negotiations this was appealed on the basis that the Specific Claim Policy does not support a strict financially based negotiations for land claims. The Honourable Mr. Justice Rennie states the following in his decision:

[6] The Minister has publicly stated that the Policy does not permit a land-based settlement, only financial compensation. This is incorrect. The Policy explicitly contemplates the acquisition and return of land. The Minister’s comments insinuate that he either refused to recognize the settlement's options or simply misunderstood altogether.

Due to the continued infrastructure development on treaty signified land tensions have risen during negotiations but the return on the land continues to be the main issue.

As of 2014, the Culbertson Tract Land Claim is currently designated as “in the negotiation process” with the Department of Indigenous and Northern Affairs Canada.

On October 18, 2021 the Tyendinaga Mohawk Territory announced a ratification, by vote, or a partial settlement of the land claim

== Background ==
=== History ===
The Haudenosaunee Confederacy, established in the early 1500s and consisting of the five Iroquoian nations of the Seneca, Onondaga, Oneida, Cayuga and Mohawk (and later in 1722, adopting the Tuscarora) were a significant military force that maintained neutrality during the coming American Revolutionary War. During this period British Army Lieutenant-Governor John Graves Simcoe signed the Simcoe Deed, otherwise referred to as Treaty 3 1/2. This treaty ensured that the People of the Six Nations Confederacy would have the right to land in the Bay of Quinte. This would continue to be occupied and settled by Loyalist people after this treaty was signed, making the land ensured in the Simcoe Treaty was largely taken by non-aboriginal communities.

=== Legal ===
The right for aboriginal communities to claim heritage land has been a troubled process through Canadian history. The legal foundation for Aboriginal rights to claim heritage land was founded in 1973. The case of Calder et al. v. Attorney-General of British Columbia that the Supreme Court decision allowed Canadian aboriginal communities legal rights to claim land. The Canadian government later created an official process of land reclamation that is negotiated between the claiming community and the Department of Indigenous and Northern Affairs Canada. This process has four stages; submission of claim, assessment, negotiations as well as settlement and implementation.

== Impact ==
There has been growing academic literature based on the continuation of settler colonial attitudes through the land reclamation process. Since the Culbertson Tract Land Claim has taken over twenty years, this is seen as the foundation of colonial attitudes on Indigenous populations.

=== Protests ===
As one of the largest First Nations Territories in Ontario, the Mohawks of the Bay of Quinte have protested in the past in solidarity with other smaller first nations communities to create awareness.

==== Highway 401 blockade - June 2007 ====
On June 29, 2007, Mohawk protestors constructed a blockade on Ontario highway 401. The blockade spanned 30 kilometres in length to bring attention and recognition to the land that the highway was built on. This protest lasted only one day in hopes to bring attention to the Culbertson land claim.

==== Gravel quarry occupation - March 2007 ====
In March 2007, a local group of Mohawk protestors gathered at the Gravel Quarry located in the Culbertson tract. This group was not supported by the community council but protested the continued profit from land that was in negotiation under this community land claim. This protest only lasted one day and the Gravel Quarry is still in use.

==== Community backlash ====
In 2008 Band Chief of the Tyendinaga Mohawks, Donald Maracle, criticized these protests based on the community's policy of decision-making through council decisions. The protests were not supported by the community council which wished for continued peaceful negotiations.

In 2011, Amnesty International released a report on the Ontario Provincial Police (OPP) response to these protests. The report outlines the inappropriate level of force displayed by the OPP during these protests, citing one instance of guns being drawn due to the mistaken sighting of a rifle in the protest.

== See also ==
- Indigenous land claims in Canada
