= International College of the Cayman Islands =

Private college in Newlands, Cayman Islands

- Type: Private university
- Established: 1970
- President: Dr. Byron R. Coon
- Students: 200-250 full and part time
- Location: Newlands, Cayman Islands; 19.28858°N 81.30237°W
- Campus: Rural
- Radio station: 101.1 ICCI-FM
- Colours: Blue and Gold
- Website: icci.edu.ky

The International College of the Cayman Islands (ICCI) is a non-profit, private, four-year independent institution of higher education which opened in the fall of 1970. It is the oldest college in the Cayman Islands and is located in Newlands in the district of Bodden Town on the island of Grand Cayman.

== Location ==
The campus of ICCI is located in the central part of Grand Cayman in the rural community of Newlands, approximately seven miles east of George Town.

== Legal control ==
The International College of the Cayman Islands is a nonprofit company in the Cayman Islands operating as an institution of higher education. It is registered with and recognized by the Education Council of the Cayman Islands Government.

The school's property and buildings are held in the name of the college by a board of trustees. The board is responsible for the maintenance of college properties and formulates college policy.

== Academic profile ==
ICCI offers Associate of Science, Bachelor of Science, Master of Science, and Master of Business Administration degrees.

Associate degrees are offered in business, general studies, and office administration. Business students can choose among several concentrations, including Accounting, Banking, Broadcasting Management, Finance, Hotel and Tourism Management, and Information Systems.

Majors for the Bachelor of Science degree are Business Administration, Human and Social Services, Liberal Studies, and Office Administration. Business students may choose concentrations in Accounting or Finance.

The Master of Science degree is offered in two areas: Human Resources and Education.

== Awarded Degrees ==
The college awarded degrees to 54 students in January 2010 at its 37th annual commencement ceremony and 72 degrees two years later in January 2012 at the 39th annual commencement. In 2014, there were 44 graduates with 46 degrees awarded: 18 associate degrees, 16 bachelor's degrees, five master's degrees in human resources and seven master's degrees in business administration. In 2017, forty-six ICCI students received degrees including 17 students who received Bachelor of Science degrees and 17 who earned associate degrees.

Summer 2023 saw 31 graduations, including 11 Associate Degrees, 9 Bachelor's degrees and 11 Master's degrees.

== Accreditation ==
ICCI is accredited by ASIC UK as a Premier Institution. The International Accreditation Council for Business Education (IACBE) has accredited all of ICCI's business programs.

The Association of Chartered Certified Accountants (ACCA) has granted “Exemption Accreditation” to the college. Exemption Accreditation means ICCI graduates are exempted from certain examination papers ordinarily required by the ACCA. ICCI is recognized by the Cayman Islands Education Council which gives credence to its degrees. Caymanian students attending ICCI are eligible for participation in Cayman Islands Government Scholarship.

== Memberships ==
- American Association of Collegiate Registrars and Admissions Officers
- American Council of Education
- American Library Association
- Cayman Islands Chamber of Commerce
- Institute of International Education
- Library and Information Resources Network
- World Association for Christian Communication

== Recognitions ==
- Recognized by the Cayman Islands' Education Council; Caymanian students eligible for participation in Cayman Islands Government Scholarship
- ICCI is accredited by ASIC UK as a Premier Institution.
- The International Accreditation Council for Business Education (IACBE) has accredited all of ICCI's business programs.
- The Association of Chartered Certified Accountants (ACCA) has granted "exemption accreditation" to the college, which means that graduates are exempted from certain examination papers offering banking courses. (The BS degree in business administration meets the requirements for admission to the Associate Charter.)
