= Mohawks of the Bay of Quinte First Nation =

Mohawk community in Ontario, Canada

Mohawks of the Bay of Quinte
- Band No. 164
- Kenhtè꞉ke Kanyen'kehà꞉ka
- People: Mohawk
- Treaty: Simcoe Deed
- Province: Ontario

Land
- Main reserve: Tyendinaga Mohawk Territory
- Land area: 73.625 km^{2} (28.427 sq mi)

Population (2025)
- On reserve: 2092
- On other land: 20
- Off reserve: 9440
- Total population: 11552

Government
- Chief: Rodrick Donald Maracle

Website
- mbq-tmt.org

Mohawks of the Bay of Quinte (MBQ; Mohawk: Kenhtè꞉ke Kanyen'kehà꞉ka; Mohawk pronunciation: [gʌ̃hˈdèːge ganjʌ̃ʔgeˈhàːga]) is a Mohawk community within Hastings County, Ontario. They control the Tyendinaga Mohawk Territory, which is a 7,362.5 ha (18,193-acre) Mohawk Indian reserve on the Bay of Quinte in southeastern Ontario, Canada, east of Belleville and immediately to the west of Deseronto. They also share Glebe Farm 40B and the Six Nations of the Grand River reserves with other First Nations.

The community takes its name from a variant spelling of Mohawk leader Joseph Brant's Mohawk name, Thayendanegea (standardized spelling Thayentiné꞉ken), which means 'two pieces of fire wood beside each other'. Officially in the Mohawk language, the community is called Kenhtè꞉ke, which means "on the bay" (from Mohawk kénhte "bay", which is also the origin of the word "Quinte"). The nation's band number is 164.

== Overview ==
The territory of the Mohawks of the Bay of Quinte (MBQ), represent one of the largest First Nations territories in Ontario.

Tyendinaga Mohawk Territory has ties to the birthplace of the Great Peacemaker, Dekanahwideh, who was instrumental in the bringing together the Mohawk, Oneida, Onondaga, Cayuga, and Seneca into the Haudenosaunee Confederacy, according to Kayanesenh Paul Williams, a Six Nations lawyer and author.

The traditional land of the MBQ, which was much more vast that the current territory, was based on a variation of the traditional Mohawk name of Joseph Brant, Thayendanegea, which means "two pieces of fire wood beside each other". In the Cayuga language the name is Tayęda꞉ne꞉gęˀ or Detgayę꞉da꞉negęˀ—"land of two logs". The geographical feature, the bay is kénhte in the Mohawk language and the community's official Mohawk name is Kenhtè꞉ke—"on the bay". It was anglicized to "Quinte".

The Mohawk nation reserve covers 7,362.5 ha (18,193-acre) in Hastings County on the Bay of Quinte in southeastern Ontario, Canada, east of Belleville and immediately to the west of the township of Deseronto.

== History ==
Following the American Revolution, the Mohawk, who were allies of the British Crown, lost their traditional homelands in the Mohawk Valley of what became New York state, when they were forced to cede their lands following the defeat of the British. As compensation for their allegiance, the Crown offered them unsettled land in Upper Canada. A group of Mohawk led by John Deseronto selected the Bay of Quinte because it was said to be the birthplace of Tekanawita, one of the founders of the Haudenosaunee Confederacy in the 12th century. The majority of the Mohawk followed Joseph Brant to the Six Nations of the Grand River First Nation in what has become the province of Ontario.

On May 22, 1784, the group of 20 Mohawk families (between 100 and 125 people) arrived at Tyendinaga. Nine years later, the Tyendinaga tract of land was officially set aside under Crown Treaty 3½, signed on April 1, 1793, by Lieutenant Governor John Graves Simcoe and thereafter known as the 'Simcoe Deed'. This tract of land, measuring 37,500 ha (92,700 acres) was legally accepted by the British Crown, and subsequently by the Upper Canada government.

A wave of Loyalists also settled in the Bay of Quinte area, and the government granted many of them land in the Tyendinaga Tract. During the period from 1820 to 1843, the Mohawk lost two-thirds of the treaty lands of the Simcoe Deed. Additional land loss has left the Mohawk with only 7,100 ha (18,000 acres) in this area today.

The major new settlement for the Mohawk and other Haudenosaunee in Canada was the Six Nations Reserve of the Grand River (where prominent Mohawk leader Joseph Brant struggled with the colonial government for control of the land). In addition, Mohawk and others joined the existing communities of Kahnawake, Kanesatake, Wahta and Akwesasne (the latter four were mostly Mohawk settlements established along the St. Lawrence River during the colonial era prior to the war).

In 1869, the Gradual Enfranchisement Act was passed by the Canadian federal government, establishing elected band councils on First Nations reserves. The first election for the Mohawks of the Bay of Quinte elected council took place in October 1870, where seven chiefs were elected to sit on the council.

== Land claims ==
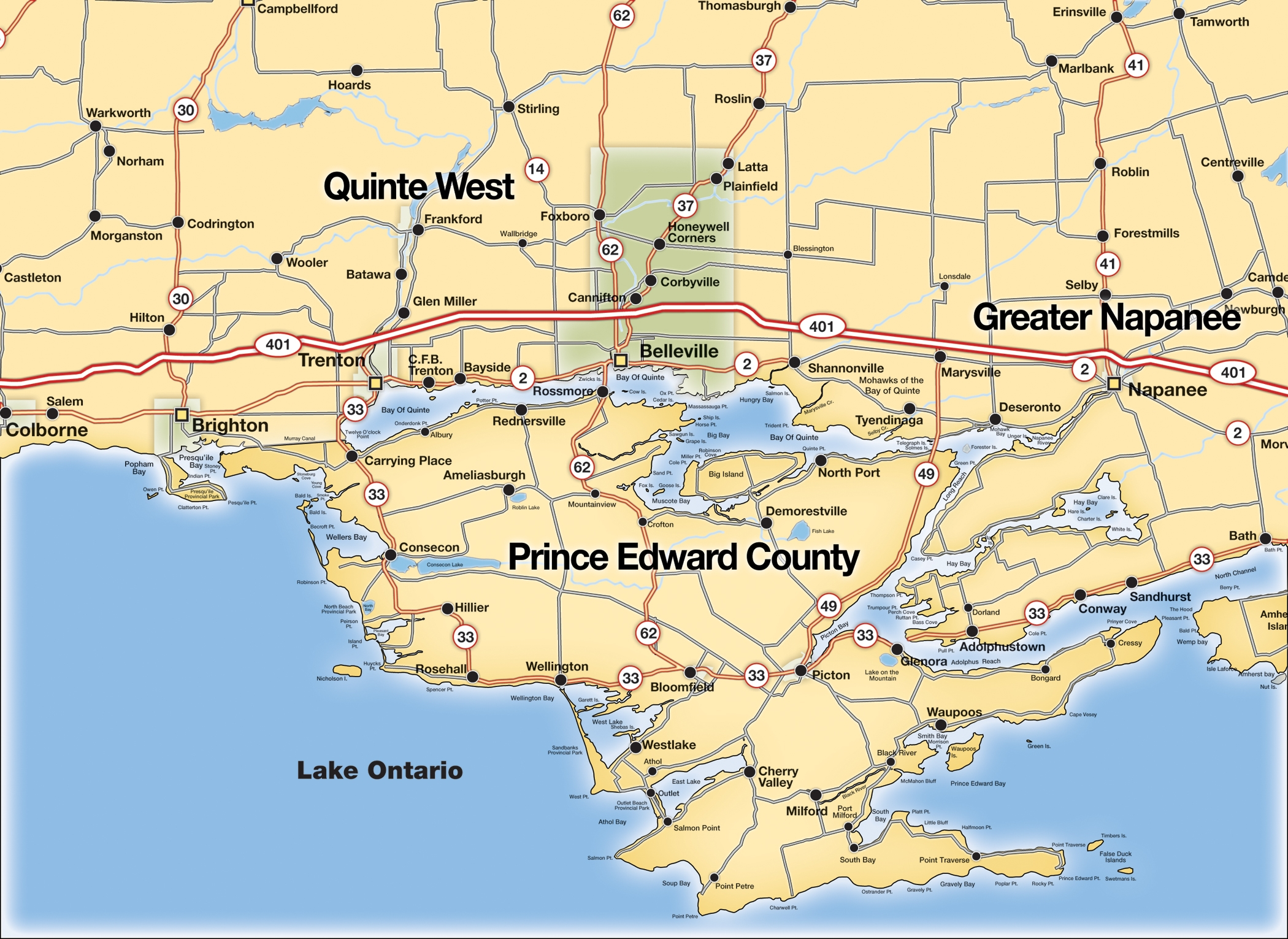
Land Claim—to the right of the green space—covers the south of Tyendinaga area and most of Deseronto.

In 1995 the MBQ filed a claim on an area which covers 923 acres of land surrounding the Tyendinaga Mohawk Territory area, which included most of the land upon which the township of Deseronto has been built. In 2003, the federal government entered into initial land claims negotiations on the Culbertson Tract land claim.

The claim is based on Loyalist settlers allegedly acquiring Mohawk traditional land illegally, during the period from 1820 to 1843, resulting in the loss of the majority of the land from the Simcoe Treaty. As set out in the Royal Proclamation of 1763, the terms and conditions for purchasing land from Mohawk included the requirement of a community vote prior to sales of any common land to non-Mohawk. Research and documentation has shown that these terms and conditions may not have been followed at Tyendinaga. The Township created a "Catalogue of Culbertson Tract Land Claim documents collection" in its archives. Chief Don Maracle renewed a call for negotiations to continue in 2011, following a period of stagnation. A symposium entitled "The Land that Supports our Feet", was held in Belleville in 2013 which was well-attended.

In June 2013, Justice Rennie of the Federal Court of Canada ruled in Mohawks of the Bay of Quinte v. Canada (Indian Affairs and Northern Development), that expropriation is one of several viable alternatives available to the government under the law.

== Long-term Drinking Water Advisories (DWA) ==
The Mohawk of the Bay of Quinte have been under a Drinking Water Advisory since 2008, "due to fecal, bacterial and algae contaminations". During a drought in the area, many of the groundwater wells—upon which they had depended—went completely dry.

During the COVID-19 pandemic in Canada, supply chains from manufacturers were disrupted, resulting in an increase in the 8 kilometres (5.0 mi) water main project from about $8.1 million to $18.2 million. In December 2020, the federal government had announced new funding of $16.7 million to "cover the cost of extending the water mains" from the township of Deseronto and the MBQ's own water-treatment plants which will then be able to serve five areas in the Tyendinaga Mohawk Territory.

This funding supports the final phase in the "multi-phase project to improve access to safe drinking water for the MBQ community. The federal government and the First Nation invested a combined total of $18.2 million towards the project, which will "ultimately lift five long-term drinking water advisories in the community". This final phase has been contracted out to Gordon Barr Limited, who began construction work in December 2020. The new water mains will link the MBQ's and Deseronto's water treatment plant, thereby connecting "86 existing homes and several of the community's semi-public buildings". By 2021, there were about 2,200 people living on the Mohawks of the Bay of Quinte reserve with another 3,000 Mohawks living nearby. Of these, there are about 90 families "on a waiting list for affordable housing".

== Government ==
The Tyendinaga Mohawk Council consists of one Chief and four Councillors, chosen during elections every two years, as per the Indian Act. On December 4, 2017, Council adopted a motion 'to approve to adopt the First Nations Election Act [FNEA] regulations for the Tyendinaga Mohawk Territory in 2019', but Council has not officially adopted a custom election code or opted into the FNEA as of December 2018.

=== Current Council ===
Chief

- R. Donald Maracle

Councillors

- Carl "Ted" Maracle
- Josh Hill
- Stacia Loft
- Chris Maracle

=== Government history ===
From the start, the government of the Mohawk community at the Bay of Quinte consisted of a council of chiefs selected following Haudenosaunee democratic tradition. When the Mohawks first came to the Bay of Quinte, they were led by Captain John Deserontyon, and he was then the first leader of the community. Between the time of the landing in 1784 and Captain John's death in 1811, the government consisted of so-called "community chiefs," "war chiefs," and Captain John himself, who was considered the "headman." All functions of government went through Captain John, and as such the finer points of the government structure are unclear, for instance how many chiefs made up the council.

Upon Captain John's death in 1811, there is evidence from external correspondence with other governments that six chiefs may have led the community in the early 1800s. Extant documents from the 1820s and 1830s include signatures from groups of four chiefs, five chiefs, and six chiefs. In 1835, with the conversion of over 60 community members to Methodism and their subsequent exodus to the Grand River, the number of chiefs on the Quinte Mohawk council was reduced by two, resulting in a council size of four, referred to as "the old chiefs," Brant Brant, Powles Claus, Joseph Pinn, and one other.

In 1843, owing to frustration among the community with how the old chiefs were organizing things, as well as complaints of their alcoholism and the poor decision they had made, the community got together to change the government structure. From this point on, the government was composed of four chiefs and four councilmen, who managed administrative needs such as finances and letter-writing, while the chiefs led the community more broadly. A little while after this, the structure was changed again, so that government consisted of two chiefs and two councilmen, who were chosen by "their equals" (i.e. other "warriors"), as well as a secretary and a treasurer. Trish Rae of Tsi Tyónnheht Onkwawén꞉na refers to this six-person council as the "managing council," and notes that the four old chiefs remained important members of the community, responsible for signing documents, but only two sat on this managing council.

According to research done by Trish Rae, from the 1840s and increasingly through the 1860s, the Superintendent of Indian Affairs played a more active role in nominating candidates to the managing council, which Rae characterizes as meddling. In 1858, Superintendent Thomas Gummersall Anderson named two men as councillors, and the community chose three other men to be on council—resulting in a council of five. The only one of the "old chiefs" on this 1858 council was Powles Claus. The following year, Visiting Superintendent W. R. Bartlett again named two men to council (Powles Claus and Thomas Claus), while three men were elected by the community (Seth W. Hill, John Loft, and William Maracle). Ultimately, the Superintendent called an end to widespread community-internal elections between 1860 and 1870, claiming that "they're a great deal of trouble, and much ill feeling was caused by the intemperance and excitement." Seth W. Hill was removed from council for intemperance in 1860, and replaced at an election by William J. W. Hill. In 1863, John Loft was dismissed from council also due to intemperance, but was not replaced, leaving a council of four. In 1866, the last remaining of the four "old chiefs" Powles Claus died, reducing the council further to three. Historical evidence indicates that the community had selected Seth Powless to replace the old chief, but he was a controversial figure and not accepted by the whole community—some thought he had "made himself" a chief, though historical evidence is inconclusive.

By December 1868, there were three men in the community who could still claim the title of "old chief" (i.e. a chief following the traditional method of selection), Chiefs Thomas Green, Joseph Penn, and Seth Powless. Fearing that the traditional form of governance they represented would be upset by upcoming legislation (the Gradual Enfranchisement Act of 1869 would be the first official imposition of a government structure by Canada on Indigenous governments), the three wrote a letter to an Indian Affairs official to implore them to see the value in their traditional ways of governance. In May 1869, the old chiefs wrote another letter alongside others in the community asking to be exempted from the upcoming legislation. The Gradual Enfranchisement Act, passed on June 22, 1869, instituted official band council elections under the jurisdiction of the Canadian Ministry for Indian Affairs. Under the 1869 act, councils were elected by men aged 21 years and older, with one chief and two "secondary chiefs" per 200 people in the community. The term of office under the act was 3 years, though the legislation also allowed "life chiefs" that were in power when the legislation was enacted to remain in their role until death, resignation, or removal by the Governor-General.

In February 1870, Superintendent Bartlett finally offered to name somebody to replace the late Powles Claus, as long as the community elected somebody to replace the late John Loft. However, this never took place. Instead, in October 1870, the first election under the new federal legislation took place. Seven men were elected following the Gradual Enfranchisement Act.

Around this same time, a group of around 200 who did not want to take part in the legislated system gathered to form a traditional council, following the old ways. This group had help from eighteen chiefs from Grand River, and they reported the creation of this traditional council to the Secretary of State. The chiefs named to this council were Chiefs Thomas Green, Joseph Penn, Seth Powless, Cornelius Maracle (unclear whether this is the same man as on the elected council, possibly Turtle clan), James Brant (likely Bear clan), David Powless (likely Wolf clan), John Brant, Simon Hill (likely Bear clan), and Brant Powless (likely the brother of Seth). Critics of this traditional council wrote to the Secretary of State to warn him about what they characterized as a power-grab by Seth Powless, backed by "pagan" "foreigners," and entreating the protection of the government as Christians.

On October 15, 1889, there was again a selection of chiefs in the traditional way. The chief titles were filled as follows: (Note: Titles taken from https://www.haudenosauneeconfederacy.com/government/current-clan-mothers-and-chiefs/)

- Turtle clan titles:
  - Tehkarihoken - Joseph I. Brant
  - Ayonwatha - vacant
  - Sadekariwadeh - vacant
- Wolf clan titles:
  - Sahrehowaneh - Charles B. Brant
  - Deyonhehgiveh - Jeremiah Hill
  - Orenrehgowah - vacant
- Bear clan titles:
  - Dehharagereneh - James B. Brant
  - Rastawehserondah - David J. Powless
  - Sosskoharowaneh - Peter John

This selection was once again done with help from people from Six Nations, and in consultation with women in the community, including Katherine Brant (likely the mother of Joseph I. Brant), Lina Brant, Lucy Sero, Margaret Jo Brant, Cecilia Ann Brant (mother of Jeremiah Hill), Rachel Maracle, and Mary John (sister of Peter John), whose names are listed at the bottom of the declaration affirming the above chiefs. Though many members of the community supported a return to a traditional council, the government of Canada did not allow it.

In 1915, supporters of Thunder Water, a man who was interested in the education of Indigenous people, the improvement of women's rights, and a traditional form of governance, ran for council. His supporters were elected, which greatly displeased the Indian Agent, prompting him to write letters complaining about them.

On September 21, 1916, there was another installation of traditional chiefs:

- Turtle clan titles:
  - Tehkarihoken - Will Green (substitutes: R. J. Barnhart, Fred Sero)
  - Ayonwatha - J. J. Brant (substitute: John W. Maracle)
  - Sadekariwadeh - William M. Doreen (substitute: Herbie S. Brant)
- Wolf clan titles:
  - Sahrehowaneh - William J. Sero (substitute: Andrew Sero)
  - Deyonhehgiveh - Abe Hill (substitute: Peter Doreen)
  - Orenrehgowah - Jacob Maracle (substitute: Joe Sero)
- Bear clan titles:
  - Dehharagereneh - Solomon J. Brant (substitute: John J. Smart)
  - Rastawehserondah - George Hill (substitutes: Johnson Lewis, J. Sero)
  - Sosskoharowaneh - P. Buck (substitute: John A. Maracle)

The women who certified this installation included Mrs. K. Hill (most likely Katherine Hill, mother of George Hill), S. B. (possibly a relative of Solomon Brant), and Mrs. Jane D. (most likely Jane Doreen, mother of William Doreen).

In December 1918, the elected council composed of Thunder Water supporters passed a motion abolishing elections, announcing a return to a life chief system. This was rejected by the government of Canada, and the election was to go forward in 1918. Only pro-election candidates were nominated for election, but since that led to only five men being nominated, the nominees were acclaimed into their council positions with no election. In January 1919, the Canadian government wrote a memorandum explaining why they wouldn't allow a return to the hereditary system, explaining that firstly, while the Six Nations and Oneida Nation of the Thames did still operate under the traditional system, they would be brought under the Indian Act system eventually (and they were, in 1924); secondly, the Canadian government felt the traditional system was cumbersome and antiquated, and "includes selection of chiefs by old women in their dotage."

Into January 1919, despite the appointment of a new elected council headed by Josiah Hill, the "Thunder Water council" continued to meet and enact resolutions. They locked the council house doors to what they referred to as the "appointed elected council," and warned the Indian Agent G. M. Campbell that "he is not a governor or ruler of this band of Indians on Tyendinaga Reserve, only a servant to the said band of Indians." Finally, in February 1919 the locks were broken. On the 4th of that month, a general council meeting with the community was held, and the supporters of the Thunder Water council passed a motion empowering Chief Joseph J. Brant to pursue legal action against the Agent-appointed council. Another motion was passed to seek deeds and treaties from Ottawa, including the "Haldimand Deed," "the constitution of the proclamation of Sir William Johnson," and the "Gunshot Treaty" and "other treaties of the Six Nations Indians," as well as to have all expenses paid by the Department for Indian Affairs.

In April 1919, there was another installation of traditional chiefs. The Minister of the Interior was notified of this installation, and advised that there would be no more elections at the Bay of Quinte. The men installed with chief titles were Joseph J. Brant, Wellington Green, Jacob Maracle, Cornelius J. Maracle, William J. Sero, Abram L. Maracle, William Doreen, George Hill, and Solomon J. Brant. The substitutes were James M. Barnhart, Fred Sero, Ambrose Claus, Jacob Maracle, John W. Maracle, Andrew Sero, Johnson Louis, John Sero, and John J. Smart. The recording secretary was Solomon J. Wright. This petition to the Ministry of Indian Affairs included the names of nearly four hundred community members. And yet, elections under the Indian Act system continued. Evidence of continued frustration by Indian Agents indicates that supporters of traditional councils continued to run for and get elected to the elected council.

Elected councils have continued to operate following the Indian Act throughout the 20th and 21st centuries.

=== Electoral history ===
==== 2021 Band Council election ====
Candidate for Chief	Vote	%
R. Donald Maracle	908	89.02%
Karoniakeshon (Andrew C.) Miracle	69	6.76%
Rejected	43	4.22%
Total	1020	100.00%
Registered/turnout		

Candidate for Councillor	Vote	%
Carl (Ted) Maracle	629	61.67%
Josh Hill	599	58.73%
Stacia Loft	597	58.53%
Chris Maracle	587	57.55%
Erin Leigh Ferrante	551	54.02%
Kurtis (Chip) Brant	484	47.45%
Manson Loft	208	20.39%
Rejected	14	1.37%
Total	1020	100.00%
Registered/turnout		

==== 2019 Band Council election ====
Election for Chief
Name of Candidate for Chief	Total votes Received	Percentage
R. Donald Maracle	650	65
Stacia Loft	290	29
Balin "Spiderman" Hill	33	3
Karoniakeshon (Andrew C.) Miracle	22	2
Total	995	100

Election for Councillors
Name of Candidate for Councillor	Total votes Received
Josh Hill	714
Carl "Ted" Maracle	665
Kelly "Brant" Maracle	649
Linda Laween	593
Christopher M Maracle	537

==== 2017 Band Council election ====
Election for Chief
Name of Candidate for Chief	Total votes Received	Percentage
R. Donald Maracle	726	84.7
Brenda Green-Edwards	106	12.4
Balin "Spiderman" Hill	25	2.9
Total	857	100

Election for Councillors
Name of Candidate for Councillor	Total votes Received
Josh Hill	505
Carl "Ted" Maracle	396
Debra Vincent	379
Stacia Loft	371
Christopher M Maracle	370
Kelly "Brant" Maracle	333
Kathleen Brant	278
Curtis Maracle	248
Manson Loft	201
Melissa Rose Anne Maracle	136
Glen "Smoke" Maracle	132

==== 2015 Band Council election ====
Election for Chief
Name of Candidate for Chief	Total votes Received	Percentage
R. Donald Maracle	819	81.0
Barbara Francis Brant	115	11.4
Andrew Clifford "Karoniakeshon" Miracle	58	5.7
Balin Hill	19	1.9
Total Valid Ballots Cast	1011	100
Number of Rejected Ballots Cast	76	--

Election for Councillors
Name of Candidate for Councillor	Total votes Received	Percentage
Carl "Ted" Maracle	505	47.2
Debra "Deb" Vincent	440	41.1
Douglas E. Maracle	433	40.5
Stacia Loft	426	39.8
Josh Hill	392	36.6
Barry D. Brant	365	34.1
Chris Maracle	291	27.2
Blaine Loft	269	25.1
Pam "Maracle" Detlor	222	20.1
Barbara Francis Brant	150	14.0
Jim McMurter	142	13.3
Keith Sero	142	13.3
Cindy Thompson	127	11.9
Catherine Hill	97	9.0
Dewayne Maracle	84	7.9
Total Valid Ballots Cast	1070	100
Number of Rejected Ballots Cast	17	--

==== 2013 election results ====
Election for Chief
Name of Candidate for Chief	Total votes Received	Percentage
R. Donald Maracle	852	63.7
Shawn Brant	358	26.8
Barbara Frances Brant	86	6.4
Corey T. Maracle	29	2.2
Isaac Balin Hill	12	9.0
Total	1337	100

Election for Councillors
Name of Candidate for Councillor	Total votes Received
Carl Maracle	811
Douglas E. Maracle	803
Barry D. Brant	658
Sandra Lewis-Den Otter	488
Jennifer Brant Neepin	413
Manson Loft	413
Keith A. Sero	341
Christine Claus	330
Curtis E. Maracle	287
Melissa R. Maracle	263
Catherine Simmons	93

==== List of Tyendinaga Mohawk Councils (1700s-present) ====
Date of selection	Chiefs		Notes	Ref
Before 1784	John Deserontyon			
1813	Old John Green, Joseph Smart Sr.		These chiefs may not have been selected in 1813, but they are attested as being chiefs in that year.	
1835	Jacob Green		By 1835, Old John Green had been removed as chief, following the traditional method of deposition.	
1836	Brant Brant, Powles Claus, Joseph Smart, Joseph Pinn, John Hill		These five men wrote a letter to Sir Francis Bond Head in June 1836 in which they are identified as the chiefs. Brant, Claus, and Pinn, are then known to have sworn an oath as chiefs in April 1837.	
Unknown	Jacob Kense			
Date of selection	Chief	Councillors	Notes	Ref
1858	Powles Claus, one other selected by Superintendent Anderson	Three elected by the community	This system, whereby two chiefs were selected by the Visiting Superintendent of Indian Affairs, and three councillors were elected by the community, was allegedly agreed upon in 1848.	
1859	Powles Claus, Thomas Claus	Seth W. Hill, John Loft, Wiliam Maracle	As in 1858, the chiefs were named by the Superintendent of Indian Affairs, W. R. Bartlett, while the councillors were elected by the community Seth W. Hill was removed from council in 1860 for intemperance and replaced by William J. W. Hill in an election. John Loft was removed in 1863 for the same reason, but was not replaced. Powles Claus died in 1866 and was not replaced on council, though many in the community wanted Seth Powless to replace him.	
October 1870	Sampson Green "Annosothkah", Archibald Culbertson, William J. W. Hill, John Loft, Seth W. Hill, Cornelius Maricle, John Claus		This was the first council elected in the Territory by status Indian men over the age of 21 under the Gradual Enfranchisement Act of 1869. The term of office under that Act was 3 years, though the legislation also allowed "life chiefs" that were in power when the legislation was enacted to remain in their role until death, resignation, or removal by the Governor-General. Sampson Green died on January 27, 1923; Archibald Culbertson died in 1892, but had been removed from council in 1887; William J. W. Hill died on December 24, 1910; John Loft died in 1878; Seth W. Hill died on August 27, 1884; Cornelius Maracle died on May 28, 1920; John Claus died on February 25, 1898.	
Before 1873	Thomas Green			
July 14, 1874	Sampson Green	Archibald Culbertson; Solomon Loft; John Claus; William Green; Jacob B. Brant; Charles Maracle		
October 1876	Sampson Green	William Green; Solomon Loft; Joshua Brant; Cornelius Maracle; Jacob Brant; William Powless; Archibald Culbertson	Archibald Culbertson was deposed on July 19, 1887, for "intemperance". This was the first council elected under the Indian Act, enacted April 1876.	
1888	Jacob B. Brant	Isaac Powless; John P. Brant; Solomon Loft; Andrew Maracle	In 1889, many members of the community supported the restoration of a council following the traditional way, but this was rejected by the government of Canada.	
November 25, 1891	Jacob B. Brant	Solomon Loft; John P. Brant; Joseph I. Brant; Abram P. Brant	Abram P. Brant was deposed in 1893, replaced by Andrew Maracle in a by-election on June 6, 1893. Andrew Maracle resigned on January 19, 1894.	
December 26, 1894	Sampson Green	Stephen Maracle; Solomon Loft; William Powless; Francis Claus	Isaac Powless was added to the council in a by-election in March 1894. Solomon Loft resigned on December 28, 1896.	
December 22, 1897	Daniel H. Maracle	Sampson Green; Solomon Loft; Stephen Maracle; Andrew Maracle		
December 27, 1901	Andrew Maracle	Sampson Green; Daniel H. Maracle; James K. Hill; Dow Claus		
December 30, 1903	Sampson Green	Daniel H. Maracle; Josiah W. Brant; Joseph S. Brant; Andrew T. C. Maracle		
December 27, 1906	Dr. Acland Oronhyatekha	Joseph W. Brant; Daniel H. Maracle; Andrew T. C. Maracle; Thomas Hill; Sampson Green	Dr. Acland Oronhyatekha (son of the more well-known Dr. Oronhyatekha) died on July 7, 1907, and Joseph J. Hill was elected Chief Councillor in a July 26, 1907 by-election.	
December 29, 1909	Thomas Hill	Daniel H. Maracle; Joseph J. Hill; William Green Sr.; David J. Brant	David J. Brant was deposed on July 30, 1912	
December 24, 1912	Josiah W. Brant	Walter A. Brant; Albert Maracle; Isaac W. Green; John A. Loft	Walter A. Brant died in 1914, and was replaced by Herman Claus in an October 29, 1914 by-election.	
December 28, 1915	Isaac Claus	William Sero; George Hill; Jacob M. Barnhart; John M. Maracle	Some sources refer to the John Maracle of this council as John A. Maracle. Isaac Claus, William Sero, and John Maracle were likely Wolf clan, George Hill Bear clan, and Jacob M. Barnhart Turtle clan. This council tried to return the governance system of the Nation to the traditional life chief system, but was prevented by the Canadian government. This council kept meeting after the following council was appointed, locking the council house doors to them.	
December 20, 1918	Josiah W. Brant	Stephen Maracle; William John; Harry M. Hill; John Walker	This council was composed of the only men who were nominated, and therefore the Canadian government saw no need for an election. The previous council locked this council out of the council house for a time, and continued to meet and pass motions without regard for this council, which they did not see as legitimate.	
December 15, 1921	John W. Maracle	Peter Joe Brant; William J. Sero; Nelson S. Maracle; Wellington Green		
December 23, 1924	Peter Joe Brant	John W. Maracle; George Hill; David H. Barnhart; Herman Claus		
December 28, 1927	Stephen Maracle	Francis John; David H. Barnhart; Herman Claus; Thomas Hill		
December 16, 1930	David H. Barnhart	Peter Joe Brant; Clarence Brant; Jerry Brant; Andrew T. C. Maracle		
December 20, 1933	Francis John	Herbert Brant; Harry Hill; Andrew T. C. Maracle; Theodore Maracle		
December 21, 1936	Clinton Maracle	Harry M. Hill; Herbert J. Brant; Frank Claus; David J. Barnhardt		
December 21, 1939	Frank Claus	Harry M. Hill; Francis John; James C. Brant; Herbert J. Brant	Herbert J. Brant and Chief Frank Claus were deposed in 1940, and replaced by John A. Brant and Harry M. Hill, respectively, in a November 28, 1940 by-election	
December 21, 1939	Harry M. Hill	Harry M. Hill; Francis John; James C. Brant; Herbert J. Brant	Herbert J. Brant and Chief Frank Claus were deposed in 1940, and replaced by John A. Brant and Harry M. Hill, respectively, in a November 28, 1940 by-election	
April 1941	John A. Brant	Abel Green; Harry M. Hill; Francis John; James Brant		
January 1, 1942	Clifford Maracle	John C. Francis; Harry M. Hill; Dan H. Mara; Nelson S. Maracle		
January 1, 1945	Nelson Green	Amos Brant; Solomon J. Brant; Nelson S. Maracle; Norway Maracle		
January 1, 1948	Nelson Green	Elliot Brant; Clarence Brant; Gerald Brant; Amos Brant	Elliot Brant died in 1950 and was replaced by Robert Melville Hill in a May 26, 1950 by-election	
December 21, 1951	Robert Melville Hill	Francis John; Clifford Maracle; Gerald Brant; Nelson Green	The Indian Act saw major revisions in 1951, including allowing status women to vote in band elections, and reducing the term of office from three years to two. Nelson Green is the son of the earlier councillor Wellington Green, who was installed in a traditional council in 1919.	
December 18, 1953	Nelson Green	Carl Edward Brant; Mark Hill; William I. Hill; Albert A. Maracle		
December 19, 1955	William Isaac Hill	Albert A. Maracle; Reginald Scero; Clifford Maracle; Francis John		
December 16, 1957	William Isaac Hill	Bennett Brant; Cedrick Maracle; George Maracle; Reginald Scero		
December 14, 1959	Robert Melville Hill	Albert A. Maracle; Arnold J. Brant; John R. Brant; Cedrick Maracle		
December 15, 1961	Robert Melville Hill	John R. Brant; Albert A. Maracle; George H. Maracle; Victor Brant		
December 14, 1963	John R. Brant	Arnold J. Brant; Charles Maracle; Franklin J. Green; Victor Brant		
December 11, 1965	John R. Brant	Carl D. Brant; Franklin Green; Earl Hill; Ross Brant	Ross Brant resigned October 20, 1967.	
December 16, 1967	Earl Hill	Carl D. Brant; Nelson Green; Audrey Maracle; Charles Maracle		
December 13, 1969	Earl Hill	Dr. Clare Brant; Carl D. Brant; Willard Hill; Garnet Maracle		
December 18, 1971	Earl Hill	Dr. Clare Brant; Carl D. Brant; Willard Hill; William J. Brant		
December 8, 1973	William J. Brant	Charles D. Brant; Charles Maracle; Elwood Brant; Clell Maracle		
December 6, 1975	William J. Brant	Donald J. Brant; Charles Maracle; Elwood Brant; Roger Brant		
December 3, 1977	Donald R. Brant	Audrey Brant; Peter Green; Richard Brant; Elwood J. Brant		
December 8, 1979	Earl Hill	Audrey Brant; Roger Brant; R. Donald Maracle; Thomas Bruce Maracle	Thomas Bruce Maracle was set aside on July 3, 1980. He then regained his seat on the council in a December 13, 1980 by-election.	
December 12, 1981	Earl Hill	Willard H. Brant; Charles A. Maracle; Douglas E. Maracle; R. Donald Maracle		
December 10, 1983	Earl Hill	Richard E. Brant; Murray D. Maracle; Douglas E. Maracle; R. Donald Maracle		
December 7, 1985	Earl Hill	Willard H. Brant; Murray D. Maracle; Douglas E. Maracle; R. Donald Maracle		
December 5, 1987	Earl Hill	Willard H. Brant; Roger M. Brant; Douglas E. Maracle; R. Donald Maracle		
December 9, 1989	Earl Hill	Willard H. Brant; Douglas E. Maracle; Paul Green; Elton Brant		
November 16, 1991	Earl Hill	Douglas E. Maracle; Charles A. Maracle; Murray Maracle; R. Donald Maracle		
1993	R. Donald Maracle			
1995	R. Donald Maracle			
1997	R. Donald Maracle			
1999	R. Donald Maracle			
2001	R. Donald Maracle			
2003	R. Donald Maracle			
2005	R. Donald Maracle			
2007	R. Donald Maracle			
2009	R. Donald Maracle			
2011	R. Donald Maracle			
2013	R. Donald Maracle	Carl Maracle; Douglas E. Maracle; Barry D. Brant; Sandra Lewis-Den Otter		
2015	R. Donald Maracle	Carl (Ted) Maracle; Debra (Deb) Vincent; Douglas E. Maracle; Stacia Loft		
2017	R. Donald Maracle	Josh Hill; Carl (Ted) Maracle; Debra Vincent; Stacia Loft		
December 8, 2019	R. Donald Maracle	Josh Hill; Carl (Ted) Maracle; Kelly (Brant) Maracle; Lynda Leween		

== Demographics ==
Date	Total registered population	Living on-reserve	Living off-reserve	Living on other reserve	Living on no-band crown land
July 2010	7,986	2,133	--	--	--
June 2011	8,075	2,017	5,940	17	1
July 2011	8,097	2,121	5,958	17	1
September 2011	8,141	2,124	--	--	--
November 2011	8,253	2,125	6,111	17	--
March 2012	8,500	2,124	6,359	17	--
April 2012	8,559	2,130	6,410	17	2
November 2012	8,895	2,145	6,733	17	--
March 2013	9,013	2,152	6,844	17	--
July 2013	9,109	2,162	6,930	17	--
October 2013	9,417	2,168	6,962	17	--
August 2014	9,280	2,167	7,096	17	--
April 2015	9,391	2,164	7,207	17	3
June 2015	9,418	2,161	7,237	17	3
August 2015	9,452	2,163	7,271	18	--
October 2015	9,481	2,159	7,304	18	--
February 2016	9,541	2,160	7,360	18	3
March 2016	9,551	2,162	7,371	18	--
February 2017	9,714	2,178	7,517	18	--
November 2018	9,869	2,169	7,679	18	3

== Notable Bay of Quinte Mohawk people ==
- Beth Brant (1941–2015), writer and poet
- Rick Brant (born 1967), track and field athlete, sports advocate
- Hannah Claus (born 1969), visual artist
- Norm Maracle, NHL player
- Lee-Ann Martin, curator and writer
- Shelley Niro (born 1954, Turtle clan) filmmaker, photographer, and installation artist
