= ZFKS-FM =

96.5 CayRock

Cayman Islands
- Broadcast area: Grand Cayman, Cayman Islands
- Frequency: 96.5 (MHz)
- Branding: 96.5 CayRock

Programming
- Format: International rock

Ownership
- Owner: dms Broadcasting (Parent company is dms Organization)
- Sister stations: Hot 104.1, 106.1 Kiss FM, X107.1

History
- First air date: July 1, 2006
- Former call signs: Style 96.5

Technical information
- Transmitter coordinates: 19°18′N 81°23′W

Links
- Website: cayrock.ky

96.5 CayRock (96.5 FM) is an international rock radio station in the Cayman Islands. The station is owned by dms Broadcasting, an affiliate of dms Organization. CayRock broadcasts twenty-four hours a day, seven days a week, year-round to a diverse community of over 50 nationalities.

The station maintains studio operations in George Town, Grand Cayman. The broadcast is also simultaneously streamed live on the internet via the station's website.

== The beginning ==
The station belongs to the parent company, dms Broadcasting, who were granted a license to broadcast on three stations in Grand Cayman by the ICTA on July 15, 2004. On January 12, 2005, the Cayman Islands Government announced the station had negotiated a deal with dms Broadcasting to allow broadcasting of all three stations from a government owned tower, thus eliminating the need to erect a new tower.

Hurricane Ivan delivered a small setback to the operation when it hit the Island on September 11, 2004. After debris were cleaned up and removed, work continued on the station.

In June 2006, dms Broadcasting acquired the variety hits station Style 96.5 and on July 1, 2006 flipped the format to rock music, launching 96.5 CayRock with 10,000 songs in a row and awarding a large cash prize when the 10,000th song was played.

== Programming ==
96.5 CayRock,"Cayman's Rock Station", plays 'All Things Rock!' - the best of rock music from all over the globe, including the popular hits of today and the classics of yesterday. Cayrock's core artists include: Foo Fighters, Led Zeppelin, Green Day, Aerosmith, Collective Soul, Guns N' Roses, AC/DC, Metallica, Pearl Jam, Nickelback, The Rolling Stones, The Tragically Hip, Powderfinger, and U2.

Notable weekday programming includes 'Talk Live @ 96-5' weekday mornings, Wendy Walker Mid-Days, Brad West afternoons and Pirate Radio - the louder side of Cayrock - hosted by 'The Pirate' at night.

Notable weekend programming includes Projekt 9-6-5 with Corey Rotic on Saturday nights.

The station's program Director is Brad Bregani, while the Promotions director is J.R. Carter.

The station also features live broadcasts at nightclubs, businesses, and charity events throughout Grand Cayman.

== Station features ==
- Hair Band Heaven - A hair metal double-shot from the days when jeans were tight, Firebird's owned the road, and hair was big! Bands like Poison, Mötley Crüe, Cinderella, Winger, Ratt, Twisted Sister, Warrant—they are all there... hosted Wendy 'Big Hair' Walker - your guide through the feathering and mullets.
- Lunch Time 4-Play - Every weekday, Cayrock's Wendy Walker dishes up some 4-Play. Listeners call the shots and email/fax in their 4-song 4-plays, and Wendy cranks em' up just in time for lunch!
- Midnight Metallica - To get you in the mood for romance and relaxation, 96.5 Cayrock cranks up Metallica by request every night at midnight.
- Skratch 'N Sniff - DJ Mike-Check & Malcolm take rock & hip-hop and mash em' up - every Friday & Sunday night.
- Resurrection Sundays - Cayrock pays its respects to the pioneers of rock (from Jimi Hendrix to Jim Morrison, The Who, and The Beatles, to the Rolling Stones and Pink Floyd) every Sunday morning.
