= General San Martín, La Pampa =

General San Martín
- Town
- Location within Argentina
- Coordinates: 37°59′S 63°34′W
- Country: Argentina
- Province: La Pampa Province
- Department: Hucal
- Time zone: UTC−3 (ART)

General San Martín is a town in La Pampa Province in Argentina.
