= ZFKZ-FM =

Cayman Islands
- Broadcast area: Grand Cayman, Cayman Islands
- Frequency: 105.3 MHz
- Branding: Breeze FM

Programming
- Format: Variety

Ownership
- Owner: Government of the Cayman Islands
- Sister stations: Radio Cayman 1

History
- First air date: 1980s
- Former call signs: ZFKA-FM / Radio Cayman 2 ZFBZ-FM

Technical information
- ERP: 5,000 watts
- HAAT: 10 meters
- Transmitter coordinates: 19°20′N 81°10′W

Links
- Website: Breeze FM Online

ZFKZ-FM (105.3 FM, "Breeze FM") is a radio station in the Cayman Islands in the British West Indies. The station is also commonly known by its former official branding as Radio Cayman 2. Breeze FM is owned by the Government of the Cayman Islands. It airs a variety format featuring Caribbean music, country music, and middle of the road music.

The station's latest licence was issued on 11 December, 2003. It was amended on 18 October, 2007 to reflect the move of the main Breeze FM transmitter and its Cayman Brac-based translator to the same 105.3 MHz frequency.

== Translators ==
City of licence	Identifier	Frequency	Power
Cayman Brac	ZFKZ-FM-1 (formerly ZFKA-FM, then ZFBZ-FM)	91.9 FM	2000 watts
Blossom Village, Little Cayman	ZFKZ-FM-2	91.9 FM	250 watts
