= FNTI =

Post-secondary institute

- Former name: First Nations Technical Institute
- Type: Indigenous-owned and -governed post-secondary institute
- Established: 1985
- President: Suzanne Katsi'tsiarihshion Brant
- Location: 314 Airport Rd, Tyendinaga Mohawk Territory K0K 1X0, Tyendinaga Mohawk Territory, Ontario, Canada
- Website: fnti.net

FNTI (formerly known as First Nations Technical Institute) is an Indigenous-owned and governed post-secondary institute located in Tyendinaga Mohawk Territory in Ontario. The institute puts on programming rooted in Indigegogy and Indigenous ways of knowing.

FNTI is a registered non-profit/charitable organization, accredited by the Indigenous Advanced Education and Skills Council (IAESC).

FNTI has over 4,500 graduates with certificate, diploma and degree credentials issued in partnership with recognized Ontario colleges and universities. The institute has also begun the delivery of standalone bachelor's degrees in accordance with the Indigenous Institutes Act, 2017.

As of July 2025, FNTI has an overall graduation rate of 95%.

== History ==
In 1917, the Canadian Royal Flying Corps survey operation identified the flatlands of Tyendinaga as an excellent location for a flight training facility, Camp Mohawk. In 1985, FNTI federally incorporated to create educational pathways for Indigenous Peoples.

FNTI started their First Peoples’ Aviation Technology – Flight program in 1989 to train First Nations, Métis and Inuit pilots on the former Camp Mohawk site.

== Partnerships ==
Since its inception, the institute has delivered certificate, diploma and degree credentials issued in partnership with recognized Ontario colleges and universities. FNTI has now begun delivering its own bachelor's degrees in accordance with the Indigenous Institutes Act, 2017.

College and University Partners:

- Canadore College
- Toronto Metropolitan University
- Wilfrid Laurier University
- Carleton University

Accreditation and Associations:

- Indigenous Advanced Education and Skills Council (IAESC)

== Programs offered ==
=== Post-Secondary Programs at FNTI in Partnership with Ontario Colleges and Universities ===
Diploma Level

- Early Childhood Education (Canadore College)
- Mental Health and Addiction Worker (Canadore College)
- Social Service Worker (Canadore College)
- Personal Support Worker

Advanced Diploma Level

- First Peoples' Aviation Technology—Flight (Canadore College)

Degree Level

- Bachelor of Arts Public Administration and Governance (Toronto Metropolitan University)

Graduate Level

- Master of Social Work (Wilfrid Laurier University)

=== FNTI Programs ===
- Bachelor of Indigenous Social Work
- Bachelor of Indigenous Justice
- Teacher of an Indigenous Language
- Bachelor of Indigenous Sustainable Food Systems
- Rotary Wing Certificate Program

=== Programs under development ===
- Bachelor of Health Sciences Indigenous Midwifery
- Bachelor of Education
