= ZFKY-FM =

Radio station in the Cayman Islands

- George Town, Cayman Islands; Cayman Islands
- Broadcast area: Grand Cayman, Cayman Islands
- Frequency: 101.9 MHz
- Branding: Rooster 101

Programming
- Format: Country

Ownership
- Owner: Compass Media Ltd.
- Sister stations: Z99 GOLD FM ISLAND FM

History
- Former call signs: ZFRS-FM and ZFRS-FM-1

Technical information
- ERP: 15,000 watts
- Translators: ZFKY-FM-1 101.9 Cayman Brac, Little Cayman

Links
- Website: Rooster101.ky

Rooster 101 (101.9 FM) is a radio station in the Cayman Islands. The station is owned by Compass Media. It airs a country music format. Compass Media was founded in 1965.

It began broadcasting as ZFKY, issued under the British call sign system. The station's current license was issued on 11 December 2003.

== Translators ==
City of licence	Identifier	Frequency	Power
Grand Cayman	ZFKY	101.9 FM	2,500 watts
Cayman Brac, Little Cayman	ZFKY-FM-1	101.9 FM	250 watts
