= ZFZZ-FM =

Z99.9 Grand Cayman
- Cayman Islands
- Broadcast area: Grand Cayman, Cayman Islands
- Branding: Z99 Grand Cayman

Programming
- Format: CHR

Ownership
- Owner: Compass Media Ltd.
- Sister stations: Rooster 101, ISLAND FM, GOLD FM

History
- First air date: May 23, 1992

Technical information
- ERP: 15,000 watts

Links
- Website: http://www.z99.ky

Z99 (99.9 FM) is a radio station in the Cayman Islands in the British West Indies. The station is owned by Compass Media. It airs a Contemporary Hit Radio music format. Compass Media was founded in 1965.

Z99FM was the first commercial radio station in the Cayman Islands. It began broadcasting as ZFZZ, issued under the British call sign system, on May 23, 1992. The station's most recent license was issued on 11 December 2003
