= Library and Information Resources Network =

- Type: Consortium, nonprofit corporation
- Industry: Libraries, education
- Founded: 1996
- Headquarters: 25400 US Hwy 19 North, Ste. #220, Clearwater, FL 33763, USA
- Website: https://www.lirn.net/

The Library and Information Resources Network (LIRN) is a 501(c)(3) non-profit consortium of approximately 284 educational institutions that share access to information resources. LIRN, formed in 1996 and incorporated in 1997, was initially a project of the Advisory Council of the (Florida) State Board of Independent Colleges and Universities (now known as the Florida Department of Education Commission for Independent Education). It is now an independent, multi-location, virtual organization, with business offices in Clearwater, Florida, United States and its officers, trustees, with technical staff located at various locations around the United States.

== Members ==
LIRN serves 296 academic institutions in 43 states, 4 territories, and 7 nations.
