= Deseronto =

- Town (lower-tier)
- Town of Deseronto
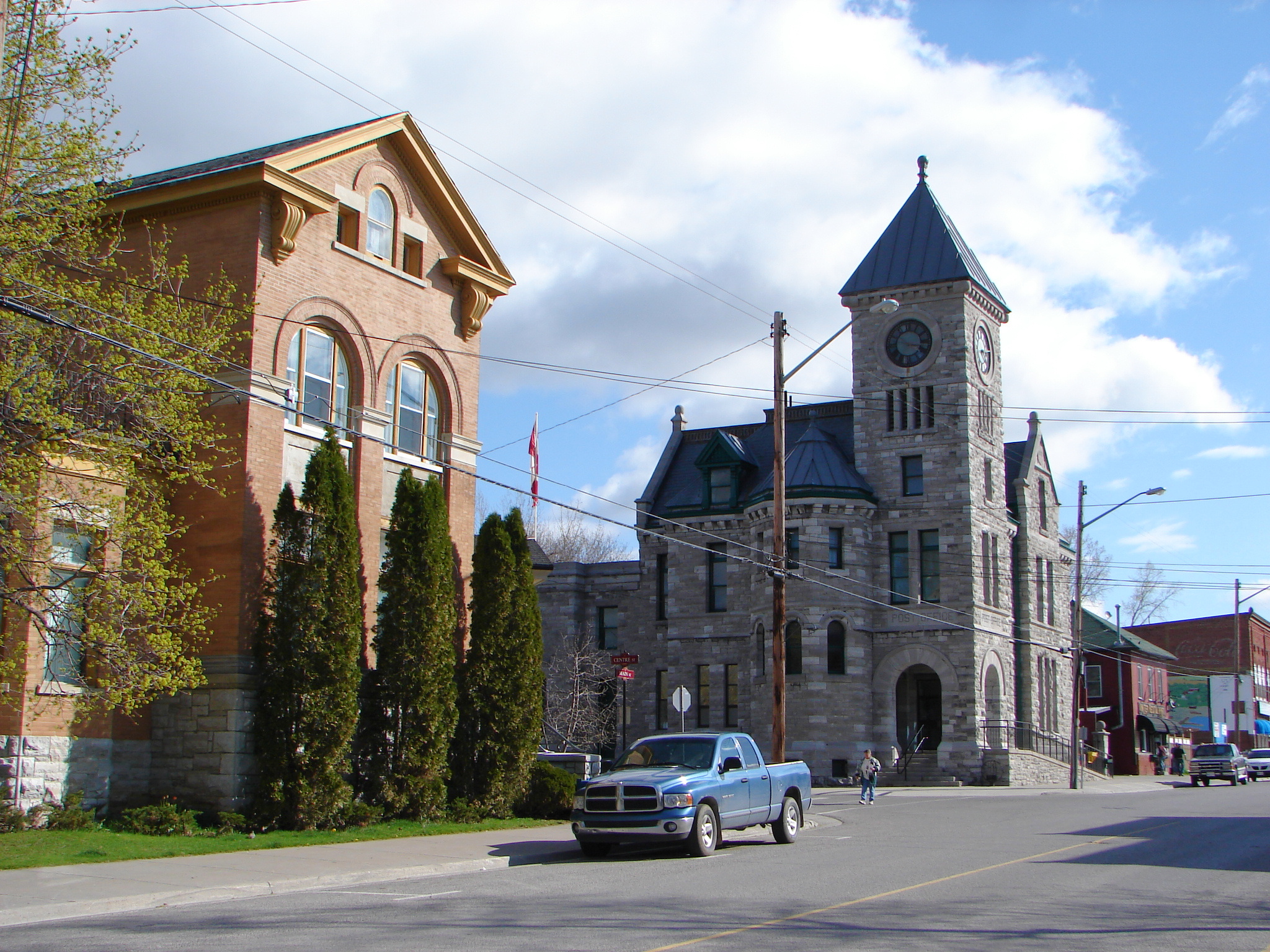
- Town Hall and Post Office

- Location within Southern Ontario
- Coordinates: 44°12′N 77°03′W
- Country: Canada
- Province: Ontario
- County: Hastings
- Settled: 1784
- Incorporated: 1871 (village)
- Incorporated: 1889 (town)

Government
  - Type: Town
  - Mayor: Dan Johnston
  - Fed. riding: Hastings—Lennox and Addington—Tyendinaga
  - Prov. riding: Hastings—Lennox and Addington

Area
  - Land: 2.52 km^{2} (0.97 sq mi)

Population (2021)
  - Total: 1,747
  - Density: 693.5/km^{2} (1,796/sq mi)
- Time zone: UTC-5 (EST)
  - Summer (DST): UTC-4 (EDT)
- Postal Code: K0K
- Area code: 613
- Website: deseronto.ca

Deseronto is a town in the Canadian province of Ontario, in Hastings County, located at the mouth of the Napanee River on the shore of the Bay of Quinte, on the northern side of Lake Ontario. It is located 5 km from Highway 401, is the eastern gateway to the Bay of Quinte tourist region, with the Skyway Bridge providing access to Prince Edward County. This is the most easterly municipality of Hastings County. It was a center of industry related to timber and mineral resources until the 1930s.

The town was named for Captain John Deseronto, a native Mohawk leader who was a captain in the British Military Forces during the American Revolutionary War. More extensive development began with the sale of village tracts by Deseronto's grandson John Culbertson in 1837. The Mohawk of the nearby Tyendinaga Mohawk Territory originally controlled the townsite as well. In 1995, the Mohawk submitted its Culbertson Tract land claim to the Canadian government, which included much of the Deseronto townsite. This has provoked considerable controversy. Negotiations on this claim have been underway with the government since 2003. In June 2013 the Federal Court of Canada issued a ruling that was a declaration of federal policy, noting that expropriation of land by payment to existing property owners was among the legal alternatives for settling the land claim, together with compensation payments and acquisition of other lands for the Mohawk.

== History ==
The area was acquired by the British Government from the Mississauga people just after the American Revolution for resettlement of loyalists from the colonies. The Crown granted the land to Loyalists and Kanien’kehá:ka (Mohawk) who had supported the British during this war. In 1784, a group of twenty Mohawk families led by Captain John Deserontyon (aka Deseronto) (c.1740–1811) became the first settlers. They founded what became the reserve now known as Tyendinaga Mohawk Territory, which originally included the town territory. The Crown personally granted Deseronto a lump sum payment of about £800 for his losses, 3,000 acres (12 km^{2}) of land, and an annual pension of £45.

Deserontyon's grandson, John Culbertson, inherited the chief's property in what is now the townsite of Deseronto. In 1837, Culbertson was granted individual title to the land by the Upper Canada government. He built a wharf on the waterfront, and sold village lots in his tract to non-natives. A settlement began to grow at the wharf, called Culbertson's Wharf.

In 1848, portions of land were bought by Anglo-Canadians Amos S. Rathbun, Thomas Y. Howe, and L. E. Carpenter, who built the area’s first sawmill. By 1850, the village was known as Mill Point. After 1855 Amos Rathbun's brother, Hugo Burghardt Rathbun (1812–1886), continued the business by himself. He acquired many village properties and developed Mill Point as one of Ontario's earliest company towns, building dwellings to house employees of his shipyard and sawmill. This led to rapid growth, and the place became an industrial and transportation hub for the logging business in the Napanee, Salmon, Moira, and Trent River watersheds. Timber was transported to the town of Deseronto from upcountry via Rathbun's Bay of Quinte Railway and was shipped out by the company's steamships for delivery to points along the Great Lakes and up the St. Lawrence River.

In 1871, a county by-law provided for the incorporation of Mill Point as a Village. Mill Point took the name Deseronto in 1881 in honour of the Mohawk chief Deserontyon (aka John Deseronto) who had led the first Mohawk and other loyalist settlers to the area following the American Revolution. In 1889, it was incorporated as a Town. At its 1895 peak, Deseronto had 3338 people and was a thriving town with bakeries, drugstores, hardware stores and hotels. Edward Wilkes Rathbun, head of the Rathbun family business at the time, was a millionaire until an 1896 fire on the timber docks did a quarter-million dollars damage.

The town's Post Office, designed by Chief Dominion Architect Thomas Fuller, was completed in 1901. During World War I, Deseronto was home to two Royal Flying Corps training camps.

The Rathbun Company developed many diversified industries, including a sash and door factory, shipyard, railway car works, terra cotta factory, flour mill, gas works and chemical works, all located in Deseronto. But changing markets, devastating fires, depleting lumber stock, and a lack of good forest management led to the company's decline; the core timber and minerals resource businesses were dead by 1916 due to exhaustion of natural resources. The company surrendered its charter in 1923. The town's population fell from 3500 in 1924 to 1300 during the Great Depression ten years later.

By the 1930s, with the Great Depression in full swing, the railway line through Deseronto was slowly abandoned. The former Canadian Northern line through the town had become a part of the Canadian National Railways system following railway nationalization by the federal government. It appeared in CNR timetables as early as 1923 as the Deseronto Subdivision. Around 1931, the CNR abandoned the section of line between Deseronto and Trenton, which also cut off the direct connection to Brighton. The line beyond Brighton had already been closed in the 1920s as a result of consolidation of the former Canadian Northern and Grand Trunk systems under the CNR. The closure of the line to Trenton cut off the connection at Trenton to the former Central Ontario Railway, by then known as the CN Maynooth and Picton subdivisions.

These developments placed Deseronto at the end of a branch line to Napanee, limiting rail transport to and from the town. The line became known as the Deseronto Branch by 1935 and the Deseronto Spur by 1959, with full line closure taking place in 1986.

== First Nations land claims ==
In the late 20th century, the Mohawk and other First Nations began to make land claims against the Canadian government alleging lands were taken illegally and they were underpaid for valuable lands. In recognition of past abuses, the government began negotiations to settle such claims, often by compensation payments but also by land exchanges or acquisition of more land, or a combination, all of which were stipulated under the Policy.

Mohawk of the Six Nation Reserve along the Grand River began large-scale protests related to land claims in February 2006, taking control of undeveloped land in Caledonia, Ontario, where a large residential development was planned. Their protest was intended to bring attention to all the First Nations land claims in Ontario, including that in Deseronto, where the Mohawk of Tyendinaga had filed a claim. The government purchased the property in Caledonia June 2006 and has held it in trust while negotiations continued. Protests and actions related to this site continued into December 2011, when the last of several criminal cases was prosecuted. But the land issue is still unresolved.

Much of the land area of the town of Deseronto is part of The Culbertson Tract Land Claim submitted by the Tyendinaga Mohawks in 1995; the claim was accepted by Canada in 2003 for negotiation. The Culbertson Tract is an 827-acre parcel of land; it includes much of downtown Deseronto and part of Tyendinaga Township, which the government has acknowledged was never ceded by the Mohawk. In November 2006, the Mohawk protested against a planned $30-million, 8.5-hectare waterfront development on the waterfront, which was within the area of their land claim. Work was postponed, and the government agreed to meet with the Mohawk leaders. Because it had the potential to affect many existing property holders, the claim was highly controversial, sparking protests on both sides.

The Mohawk halted its Deseronto negotiations in June 2008 when the government declared that it would not consider expropriation of non-natives to expand the reserve as this was not permitted under the applicable Policy. Some rapprochement was seen in October 2013 with a well-attended symposium on "The land that supports our feet". The Township has archived material into a "Catalogue of Culbertson Tract Land Claim documents collection".

In June 2013, Mr Justice Rennie of the Federal Court of Canada ruled in a declaration of federal policy, in Mohawks of the Bay of Quinte v. Canada (Indian Affairs and Northern Development), that expropriation is a viable option, one of several alternatives available to the government under the law:

[1] The Mohawks of the Bay of Quinte (the applicant) occupy the Tyendinaga Mohawk Territory (Indian Reserve No. 38) in southeastern Ontario. This territory is part of the original Mohawk Tract granted to the Six Nations by Treaty 3½, the Simcoe Deed of 1793.

[2] The Culbertson Tract is a 923-acre parcel of land within the Mohawk Tract. The applicant alleges it was wrongfully alienated by the Crown in 1837. The Minister accepted this claim for negotiation in accordance with criteria of the Specific Claims Policy (the Policy) in 2003. A decade later, the claim remains unresolved.

[3] The applicant submits that the Minister is in breach of his fiduciary duty to negotiate in good faith. The applicant seeks a declaration that, as an aspect of his duty to negotiate in good faith, the Minister must consider all possible options including the acquisition of third party interests in the Culbertson Tract and returning the land to the applicant. The applicant seeks an order directing that the Minister negotiate on this basis.

[4] The Minister does not dispute the obligation to negotiate in good faith, which is derived from the honour of the Crown; rather the Minister characterizes this application as an attempt to force a particular negotiation position on the Crown and a breach of the confidentiality provisions of the protocol governing negotiations.

[5] While this case engages questions of Aboriginal law, it fits equally into orthodox principles of administrative law. The Minister has publicly committed to a policy and has a broad discretion under that policy as to how he will negotiate. In the exercise of that discretion, the Minister must have regard to the Policy’s parameters and terms. This requirement is not new law, nor is it unique to Aboriginal law; rather it is simply the application of settled principles of administrative law.

[6] The Minister has publicly stated that the Policy does not permit a land-based settlement, only financial compensation. This is incorrect. The Policy explicitly contemplates the acquisition and return of land. The Minister’s statements suggest that he either misunderstood or refused to acknowledge the scope of the settlement options open to him.

[7] While it is for the Minister to decide what negotiation position he will take, the duty to negotiate in good faith precludes him from publicly mischaracterizing the Policy. The distinction in the end, is narrow, but real. It is the difference between saying I cannot do something as opposed to saying I can do something but choose not to do so.

[8] The Court cannot interfere with the negotiations or mandate that the Minister take a specific negotiation position. Under the Policy, the Minister may negotiate on the basis of land, monetary compensation or a mix of each, in any proportion he considers appropriate. However, in light of the Minister’s public statements, declaratory relief is appropriate. I accept the applicant’s argument that the Minister’s mischaracterization of the Policy affects the perception of other residents in the broader community, who may, in turn, see the applicant as intransigent and demanding. Misstating the tools available to the Minister may in fact impede settlement and reconciliation. Therefore, a declaration to clarify the governing Policy has some utility.

== Demographics ==
In the 2021 Census of Population conducted by Statistics Canada, Deseronto had a population of 1,747 living in 723 of its 803 total private dwellings, a change of −1.5% from its 2016 population of 1,774. With a land area of 2.52 km^{2} (0.97 sq mi), it had a population density of 693.3/km^{2} (1,795.5/sq mi) in 2021.

Canada census – Deseronto community profile

	2021	2016	2011
Population	1,747 (-1.5% from 2016)	1,774 (-3.3% from 2011)	1,835 (0.6% from 2006)
Land area	2.52 km^{2} (0.97 sq mi)	2.51 km^{2} (0.97 sq mi)	2.52 km^{2} (0.97 sq mi)
Population density	693.5/km^{2} (1,796/sq mi)	705.7/km^{2} (1,828/sq mi)	728.3/km^{2} (1,886/sq mi)
Median age	44.0 (M: 43.6, F: 44.4)	41.1 (M: 40.0, F: 42.1)
Private dwellings	803 (total) 723 (occupied)	740 (total)	764 (total)
Median household income	$63,600	$50,458

References: 2021 2016 2011

Historical census populations – Deseronto

Year	Pop.	±%
1891	3,338	—
1901	3,527	+5.7%
1911	2,013	−42.9%
1921	1,847	−8.2%
1931	1,476	−20.1%
1941	1,261	−14.6%
1951	1,522	+20.7%

Year	Pop.	±%
1956	1,729	+13.6%
1961	1,797	+3.9%
1966	1,836	+2.2%
1971	1,863	+1.5%
1976	1,909	+2.5%
1981	1,740	−8.9%
1986	1,881	+8.1%

Year	Pop.	±%
1991	1,862	−1.0%
1996	1,811	−2.7%
2001	1,796	−0.8%
2006	1,824	+1.6%
2011	1,835	+0.6%
2016	1,774	−3.3%
2021	1,747	−1.5%

Source: Statistics Canada

== Transportation ==
Deseronto Transit was a public transportation service in the town, with connections to Napanee, Belleville, and Picton. Service ended in December 2025.

== Media ==
- One analogue television transmitter, CJOH-TV-6, is licensed to serve Deseronto. It rebroadcasts an Ottawa CTV station.

== Notable people ==
- Ryland James (born 1999), pop singer
- George Fraser Kerr (1895-1929), recipient of the Victoria Cross

== See also ==
- List of towns in Ontario
- List of townships in Ontario
- List of population centres in Ontario
