= Dms Broadcasting =

dms Broadcasting, now known as Stingray Media, is a broadcasting company operating seven radio stations in the Cayman Islands. The company is an affiliate of dms Organization Ltd, a business conglomerate engaged in the financial services, real estate and media industries.

The stations include 96.5 CayRock, Hot 104.1, 106.1 Kiss FM, X107.1, 93-5 CayCountry, Magic 91.5, and BOBO 89.1. Stations are housed in the dms Broadcasting Centre in George Town, Grand Cayman. The broadcasts are also simultaneously streamed live on the internet via each station's website.

== History ==
Originally slated to be named "Hot 104", "Mix 106.1", and "Island 107.1", the stations were granted licenses to broadcast by the ICTA on July 15, 2004.

Hurricane Ivan delivered a small setback to the operation when it hit the Island on September 11, 2004. After debris were cleaned up and removed, work continued on the cluster of stations. On January 12, 2005, the Cayman Islands Government announced the station had negotiated a deal with dms Broadcasting to allow broadcasting of all three stations from a government-owned tower, thus eliminating the need to erect a new tower.

The first official day of broadcasting was April 11, 2005 with the stations final names being Hot 104.1, 106.1 Kiss FM, and X107.1. X107.1 had a large concert to kick off the launch of the station featuring R&B artist, Mýa.

In June 2006, dms Broadcasting acquired the variety hits station "Style 96.5" and flipped the format to rock music, launching 96.5 CayRock with 10,000 songs in a row and awarding a $1,000 prize when the 10,000th song was played.
