= ZFKI-FM =

- Cayman Islands
- Broadcast area: Grand Cayman, Cayman Islands
- Frequency: 101.1 MHz
- Branding: ICCI-FM

Programming
- Format: College

Ownership
- Owner: International College of the Cayman Islands

History
- First air date: 21 May 1973

Technical information
- ERP: 500 watts
- Transmitter coordinates: 19°17′N 81°18′W

Links
- Website: N/A

ICCI-FM (101.1 FM) is a non-commercial radio station in the Cayman Islands in the British West Indies. The station is owned by the International College of the Cayman Islands and broadcasts from Newlands on Grand Cayman. It airs a College radio format blending music and news. ICCI-FM serves as a training workshop for broadcasting students of the college. Talk programming includes locally produced shows recorded in both English and Spanish.

ICCI-FM was the first radio station to broadcast from within the Cayman Islands and remains the oldest continuously broadcasting radio station in the Cayman Islands. As the first licensed radio station in the Cayman Islands it began broadcasting in May 1973. The station's latest license was issued on 11 December 2003.
