= JoJo Wright =

American radio show host

- Born: Houston, Texas, U.S.
- Occupations: Reality and game show host, television personality, radio personality
- Years active: 1997–present
- Website: JojoWright.com

JoJo Wright (“JoJo On The Radio”) is an American radio personality, Internet show host, celebrity commentator, and film actor. He hosts the radio show, “JoJo On The Radio,” which airs on the Top 40 station in Los Angeles, KIIS-FM, and is nationally syndicated in more than 60 markets. In addition, JoJo co-hosts the MSN Internet show, “Go See This Movie,” and has been a celebrity commentator on numerous shows including: CNN's “Showbiz Tonight”, MTV's “US Weekly’s Top 10 Moments of ‘The Hills’ special,” “KTLA Morning News”, “E! News,” and TV Guide specials. Also, he is featured in two films, Battlefield America and The Helpers. He also made a guest appearance as himself on Big Time Rush.

== Early life ==
JoJo was raised near Houston, Texas. While growing up, he was extremely shy and, today, still considers himself as being relatively shy off-air.

== Career ==
JoJo is an on-air personality featured across multiple media platforms, including: radio, television, film, and the Internet.

=== Radio ===
JoJo's radio career began the summer before he started high school, while working for KBUK in Baytown, TX. As a high school student working a lower-level position at the station, JoJo learned that the overnight host had been arrested for writing bad checks. JoJo offered to fill in and since no one else was available, he got his big break. Shortly after, JoJo was offered his first on-air, overnight slot. From there, he went on to land jobs at larger stations, such as: San Francisco's KYLD (Top 40/Rhythmic), Dallas’ KHYI (Pop), Charlotte's WCKZ (Top 40/Rhythmic), and Anaheim's KEZY (Top 40).

Year after year, he continued working his way up the ladder, first landing the overnight shift at KIIS-FM/Los Angeles and finally becoming the on-air host for the prestigious station's night show. The “JoJo On The Radio” show is well known for its extreme interaction with listeners, as well as its two recurring segments: “Question of the Night” and “Stunt Team.” The show's current stunt team members are Karli from the Block and TJ Rhymes. Previous members include: Fat Daniel, Geena The Latina, and Manny On The Streets.

In September 2011, JoJo launched his XM Satellite Radio show, JoJo Wright Live!

He was named as the new host of the CHR edition of the iHeartRadio Countdown as of February 24, 2018, replacing Romeo who had hosted the show since its 2014 inception.

In January 2024, Wright's Sunday evening KIIS program "KPop With JoJo" began airing on the majority of iHeartRadio's top-40 stations nationwide.

=== JoJo Jam ===
Every year, KIIS-FM holds a local, touring concert hosted by JoJo. The JoJo Jam Tour travels to local high schools and has been a featured event at Universal CityWalk Hollywood and Knott's Berry Farm. Past JoJo Jam artists include: Rihanna, Flo Rida, Jason Derulo, Jay Sean, Orianthi, Ashlee Simpson, and Three 6 Mafia.

=== Broadcast personality ===
JoJo has conducted many exclusive interviews and experienced many once-in-a-lifetime opportunities, thus far in his career. In 1993, JoJo had the chance to host one of Brandon Lee's final interviews before his passing. In both 2000 and 2001, JoJo was a backstage reporter at the Radio Music Awards (ABC). Also in 2001, JoJo was a presenter at FOX's “Teen Choice Awards.”

One of the greatest landmark moments of JoJo's life occurred on September 13, 2003, when he hosted a party for his hero, Michael Jackson, at Neverland Ranch. At one point during the event, the two were onstage together and Michael shoved cake into JoJo's face. JoJo is a huge Michael fan and even has a tattoo of the MJJ Productions logo on his right forearm.

Also in 2003, JoJo was featured as a celebrity judge on NBC's reality TV show, “Fame,” working alongside Joey Fatone, Carnie Wilson, Debbie Allen, and Johnny Wright. In both 2003 and 2004, JoJo co-hosted Fox's holiday special, “Jingle Ball Rock,” and was a backstage reporter at the Radio Music Awards (NBC).

In 2006, JoJo played himself in the film, Bring It On: All or Nothing, starring Hayden Panettiere and Solange Knowles. That same year, he co-hosted FOX's “Teen Choice Awards Red Carpet Live Pre-Show” with Jillian Barberie.

Just before the 2008 Presidential Election, JoJo received a call during dinner informing him that then-Senator Barack Obama was on the phone for an impromptu interview. During the interview, JoJo asked then-Senator Obama if he could have access to Area 51. That same year, during one of his radio show broadcasts, JoJo announced that he was going to be a first-time father, while on-air with Usher Raymond IV.

In 2010, JoJo appeared with Justin Bieber in his music video for “Love Me,” and was featured in a Black Cards video with his good friend, Pete Wentz.

== Awards ==
JoJo's radio talent has been widely recognized within the industry. He has had two nominations and one win for the Radio Music Awards Top 40 Air Personality of the Year, and has had other highly acclaimed award nominations including the Marconi Award for Major Market On-Air Personality and Billboard Magazine's Top 40 Air Personality of the Year.

== Personal life ==
JoJo is married to his wife, Dena, and together they have their daughter, Sophie. The three live happily with their pug, Jumary, and their small lab, Coco.

One of his greatest passions is giving back to the community and throughout summer 2010, he hosted the Make It Wright with JoJo campaign. Each day of the summer, he helped out a different charity. On the final day, he went skydiving, in support of the Lance Armstrong Foundation.

JoJo's favorite football team is the Dallas Cowboys.

One of his favorite hobbies is being a paranormal investigator.
