= ZFKK-FM =

106.1 Kiss FM

Cayman Islands
- Broadcast area: Grand Cayman, Cayman Islands
- Frequency: 106.1 (MHz)
- Branding: 106.1 Kiss FM

Programming
- Format: Adult Contemporary

Ownership
- Owner: dms Broadcasting
- Sister stations: 96.5 CayRock, Hot 104.1, X107.1

History
- First air date: 11 April 2005

Technical information
- ERP: 5,000 watts
- Transmitter coordinates: 19°18′N 81°23′W

Links
- Website: kiss1061fm.ky

106.1 Kiss FM (106.1 FM) is an adult contemporary music formatted radio station in the Cayman Islands. The station is owned by dms Broadcasting, an affiliate of dms Organization.

The station maintains studio operations in George Town, Grand Cayman. The broadcast is also simultaneously streamed live on the internet via the station's website.

== History ==
The station belongs to a parent company, dms Broadcasting, which was granted a license to broadcast on three stations in Grand Cayman by the ICTA on 15 July 2004. On 12 January 2005, the Cayman Islands Government announced the station had negotiated a deal with dms Broadcasting to allow broadcasting of all three stations from a government owned tower, thus eliminating the need to erect a new tower.

Hurricane Ivan reached Grand Cayman on 11 September, 16 years to the day from when the last hurricane struck the Islands. After debris was cleaned up and removed, work continued on the station. The first official day of broadcasting was 11 April 2005 with the stations final names being Hot 104.1, 106.1 KISS-FM, and X107.1.

== Programming ==
106.1 Kiss FM showcases a variety of music, including current tracks and the top requested gold tracks from 1970s, 1980s, 1990s, and 2000s.

Notable weekday programming includes Tim and Maya in the Morning, middays with Scott K. James, afternoons with Rita Estevanovich, Chuck Taylor on nights, and Jim Curtis with Boogie Nights on Friday nights.

Notable weekend programming includes Saturday shows hosted by Scott K. James and Logan Blake plus Sunday shows hosted by Chuck Taylor and Jim Curtis.

The station also features live broadcasts at nightclubs, businesses, and charity events throughout Grand Cayman.
