= ZFKH-FM =

Hot 104.1
- Grand Cayman; Cayman Islands
- Frequency: 104.1 MHz
- Branding: Hot 104.1

Programming
- Format: Caribbean Music

Ownership
- Owner: dms Broadcasting (Parent company is dms Organization)
- Sister stations: 96.5 CayRock, 106.1 Kiss FM, X107.1

History
- First air date: April 11, 2005

Technical information
- ERP: 5,000 watts
- Transmitter coordinates: 19°18′N 81°23′W

Links
- Website: hot1041.ky

Hot 104.1 (104.1 FM) is a Caribbean music radio station in the Cayman Islands. The station is owned by dms Broadcasting, an affiliate of dms Organization.

The station maintains studio operations in George Town, Grand Cayman. The broadcast is also simultaneously streamed live on the internet via the station's website.

== The beginning ==
The station belongs to the parent company, dms Broadcasting, who were granted a license to broadcast on three stations in Grand Cayman by the ICTA on July 15, 2004. On January 12, 2005, the Cayman Islands Government announced the station had negotiated a deal with dms Broadcasting to allow broadcasting of all three stations from a government owned tower, thus eliminating the need to erect a new tower.

Hurricane Ivan delivered a small setback to the operation when it hit the Island on September 11, 2004. After debris were cleaned up and removed, work continued on the station. The first official day of broadcasting was April 11, 2005 with the stations final names being Hot 104.1, 106.1 KISS-FM, and X107.1.

== Programming ==
"Hot 104.1 FM", plays an eclectic blend of Reggae, Dancehall, Reggaeton, Soca, and Calypso music, including Mavado, Vybz Kartel, Damian Marley, Destra, Beres Hammond, I-octane, Mr. Vegas, Pitbull, Rupee, Bob Marley, Oscar B, and Sizzla.

The current weekday on-air lineup includes The Morning Grind with Preston & Matt Brown – powered by Lime, DJ Renato with Digicel's Midday Grooves, and The Traffic Jam from 5pm - 7pm, Shavy T with Night Flight, & the Midnight Diva - Jamie. Friday kicks into high gear with the Friday Jump Off with DJ Fross from 5–7 pm, then Friday Night OverDrive with DJ Rich Kid.

Notable weekend programming includes Matt Brown on Saturday mornings, Shavy T on The Saturday Mix, Dj Preston with the Saturday Nights Roll-Out by Digicel. Then Sunday Morning Gospel from 5–11 am is followed by Smooth Blend of Caribbean Lovers rock and Oldies, then Hot Soca Flow with DJ M pumps it up from 2–6 pm. Sunday Night ends with Rockers Island with Super C live until midnight.

The station also features live broadcasts at nightclubs, businesses, and hosts various charity events throughout Grand Cayman.
