= KSFH =

Radio station in Mountain View, California

Mountain View, California; United States
- Broadcast area: Mountain View – Sunnyvale
- Frequency: 87.9 MHz

Ownership
- Owner: Mountain View Public Broadcasting

History
- First air date: 1976; 49 years ago
- Last air date: December 2, 2021; 3 years ago
- Former frequencies: 90.5 MHz (1976–1982); 88.1 MHz (1982–1999)
- Call sign meaning: Saint Francis High School (original owner)

Technical information
- Licensing authority: FCC
- Facility ID: 62118
- Class: D
- ERP: 10 watts vertical
- HAAT: −44 meters (−144 ft)
- Transmitter coordinates: 37°23′51.22″N 122°3′4.86″W

Links
- Public license information: Public file; LMS

KSFH was an American non-commercial educational FM radio station licensed to operate on 87.9 MHz with an effective radiated power of 10 watts. KSFH started as the radio station of Saint Francis High School at Mountain View, California. It was sold to Mountain View Public Broadcasting in 2015, with the sale being consummated on October 7 that year. KSFH was one of two radio stations licensed to operate on 87.9 MHz in the United States.

== History ==
KSFH was started by Saint Francis High School, with its first application for a construction permit being filed on December 11, 1972. The KSFH callsign was issued to the construction permit on February 12, 1973. KSFH was first licensed on March 16, 1976.

Formerly authorized to operate on 90.5 MHz and 88.1 MHz, KSFH moved to 87.9 MHz in 1999. It was one of only two radio stations in the United States to be licensed on this frequency, with the other being a translator station for CSN International in Sun Valley, Nevada.

In 2014, Mountain Valley Public Broadcasting agreed to purchase the KSFH license at a price of $20,000. The new owner's principals were associated with various stations in California, Washington, and Canada aimed at Indians; board member Sukhdev Dhillon was also president of a group that, in 2015, would purchase KMKY in Oakland. While the sale was pending, in February 2015, the station filed to move to 100.7 MHz, citing the "operational challenges" of operating on a frequency not normally used for FM radio. St. Francis High School consummated the sale of KSFH to Mountain View Public Broadcasting on October 7, 2015.

The station's license was deleted on December 2, 2021, after the station's owner declined to renew the license.
