= ZFKX-FM =

Grand Cayman, Cayman Islands; Cayman Islands
- Broadcast area: Grand Cayman, Cayman Islands
- Frequency: 107.1 (MHz)
- Branding: X107.1

Programming
- Format: Top 40

Ownership
- Owner: dms Broadcasting (parent company is dms Organization)
- Sister stations: 96.5 CayRock, Hot 104.1, 106.1 Kiss FM

History
- First air date: 11 April 2005

Technical information
- ERP: 5,000 watts
- Transmitter coordinates: 19°18′N 81°23′W

Links
- Website: x1071.ky

X107.1 (107.1 FM) is a Top 40 radio station in the Cayman Islands. The station is owned by dms Broadcasting, an affiliate of dms Organization.

The station maintains studio operations in George Town, Grand Cayman. The broadcast is also simultaneously streamed live on the internet via the station's website.

== The beginning ==
The station was granted a license to broadcast by the ICTA along with sister stations, HOT 104.1 and 106.1 KISS FM on 15 July 2004. On 12 January 2005, the Cayman Islands Government announced the station had negotiated a deal with dms Broadcasting to allow broadcasting of all three stations from a government owned tower, thus eliminating the need to erect a new tower.

Hurricane Ivan delivered a small setback to the operation when it hit the Island on 11 September 2004. After debris were cleaned up and removed, work continued on the station. The first official day of broadcasting was 11 April 2005 with the first song being played, "Sugar" by Trick Daddy.

== Programming ==
The radio station continues to thrive, touting itself as "Cayman's Number One Hit Music Station" and featuring disc jockeys with major market broadcasting experience. X107.1 plays contemporary Top 40 music from around the world including tracks from the United States, Canada, the United Kingdom, Australia, Mexico, and Jamaica.

Notable weekday programming includes Blake and Erin in the morning Kate Mac on mid-days, Dave Kelly on afternoons and The X Mix or Friday Night Live with DJ Jeremy on late nights.

Notable weekend programming includes Saturday Night X Live from London with Dave Kelly

The station also features live broadcasts at nightclubs, businesses, and charity events throughout Grand Cayman.
