= ZFKG-FM =

Cayman Islands
- Broadcast area: Grand Cayman, Cayman Islands
- Frequency: 89.9 MHz
- Branding: Radio Cayman 1

Programming
- Format: News/Talk
- Affiliations: BBC World Service

Ownership
- Owner: Government of the Cayman Islands
- Sister stations: ZFKZ-FM (aka "Radio Cayman 2"); ZFGT-FM (aka "Sunny 107.9")

History
- First air date: 12 December 1976
- Former call signs: ZFKC-FM, ZCX; ZFKB-FM (Cayman Brac)

Technical information
- ERP: 5,000 watts
- HAAT: 10 meters
- Transmitter coordinates: 19°20′N 81°10′W

Links
- Webcast: Listen Live
- Website: RadioCayman.gov.ky

ZFKC-FM (89.9 FM, "Radio Cayman 1") is a radio station in the Cayman Islands. The station is owned by the Cayman Islands Government and has a news/talk format with the focus on community affairs and current events, plus blocks of music.

Radio Cayman's first broadcast was on 12 April 1976 but regular programmes did not begin until December of that year. The station's most recent licence was issued on 11 December 2003, but it was amended on 18 October 2007 to reflect the move of the main Radio Cayman 1 transmitter in Grand Cayman and its Cayman Brac translator to the same 93.9 MHz frequency.

== Translators ==
City of licence	Identifier	Frequency	Power
Cayman Brac	ZFKG-FM-1 (formerly ZFKB-FM)	93.9 FM	2,000 watts
Blossom Village, Little Cayman	ZFKL-FM	93.9 FM	250 watts
Gun Bluff	ZFKC (formerly ZCX)	1550 AM	20,000 watts
