= DWBC-FM =

Radyo Biñan (DWBC)
Biñan; Philippines
- Broadcast area: Western Laguna and surrounding areas
- Frequency: 87.9 MHz
- Branding: 87.9 Radyo Biñan

Programming
- Language: Filipino
- Format: Community Radio

Ownership
- Owner: Biñan city government

History
- First air date: October 15, 2018
- Call sign meaning: Biñan City

Technical information
- Licensing authority: NTC
- Power: 1,000 watts

DWBC (87.9 FM), broadcasting as 87.9 Radyo Biñan, is a low-power radio station owned and operated by the Biñan city government. Its studio and transmitter are located at the City Hall, Brgy. Zapote, Biñan.
