= Tyendinaga Mohawk Territory =

First Nation territory in Ontario, Canada

Tyendinaga Mohawk Territory Kenhtè:ke
- Indian reserve
- Tyendinaga Mohawk Territory Indian Reserve
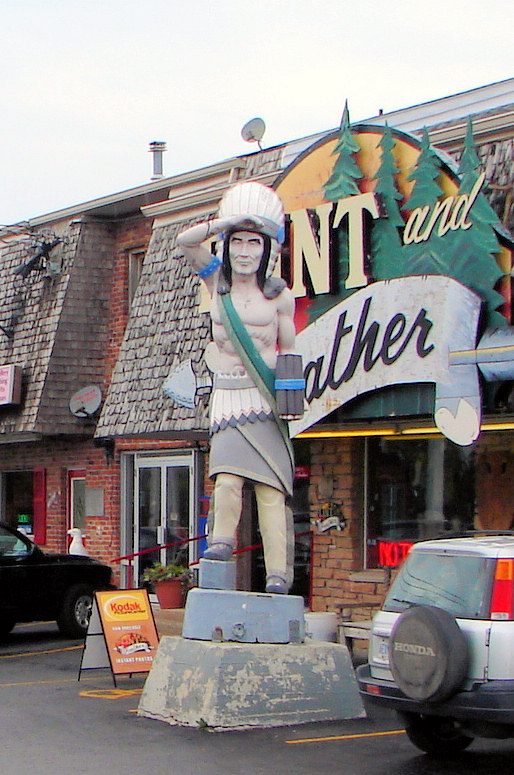
- Novelty statue at the Mohawk Plaza on Highway 49

- Location within Southern Ontario
- Coordinates: 44°11.5′N 77°08′W
- Country: Canada
- Province: Ontario
- County: Hastings
- First Nation: Mohawks of the Bay of Quinte
- Settled: 1784
- Formed: 1793 (official deed)

Government
  - Chief: Donald Maracle
  - Federal riding: Hastings—Lennox and Addington—Tyendinaga
  - Prov. riding: Hastings—Lennox and Addington

Area
  - Land: 71.06 km^{2} (27.44 sq mi)

Population (2016)
  - Total: 2,525
  - Density: 29.9/km^{2} (77/sq mi)
- Time zone: UTC-5 (EST)
  - Summer (DST): UTC-4 (EDT)
- Postal Code: K0K
- Area code: 613
- Website: www.mbq-tmt.org

Tyendinaga Mohawk Territory (Kenhtè:ke) is the main First Nation reserve of the Mohawks of the Bay of Quinte First Nation. The territory is located in Ontario east of Belleville on the Bay of Quinte. Tyendinaga is located near the site of the former Mohawk village of Ganneious.^{:10}

== History ==
=== Prior to founding ===
According to the official history of the Mohawks of the Bay of Quinte, Tyendinaga was the birthplace of The Great Peacemaker, who was instrumental in the founding of the Haudenosaunee or Iroquois Confederacy, sometimes dated in the 12th century. Various non-Indigenous scholars have suggested that the Haudenosaunee may have developed in the 15th century, but there is no consensus.

=== 18th century ===
During much of the eighteenth century, the land that would later become the Tyendinaga Mohawk Territory was populated by the Mississauga. Beginning in 1784, the territory was settled by Mohawks who left their home in Fort Hunter, New York due to the victory of the American colonists in the American Revolutionary War, as they had been allied with the British. The British ceded all their territory in the Thirteen Colonies east of the Mississippi River to the United States, including that of the Haudenosaunee, after the colonies gained independence. Four of the six Haudenosaunee nations had been largely allied with the British.

The chief of the Fort Hunter Mohawk was John Deserontyon, a Loyalist Captain who had fought alongside British forces during the war.^{:11} At first, Deserontyon faced criticism for his chosen site of relocation from fellow chief Joseph Brant (who preferred to settle in the valley of the Grand River). It was also opposed by British colonial officials Frederick Haldimand and Sir John Johnson, Superintendent of Indian Affairs, who had been placed in charge of managing the resettlement. The Crown had originally reserved this land for resettlement of Loyalists by the Crawford Purchase of 1783. The Crown did grant part of this land to the Mohawk along the Bay of Quinte. On May 22, 1784, about 20 Mohawk families, comprising a total of 100-125 individuals, arrived in the area after canoeing from Lachine, Quebec. The landing of these first families is commemorated annually with a re-enactment and a thanksgiving for their safe arrival.

Throughout the 1780s, the settlement grew and developed. A teacher named Vincent and paid by the Indian Department was assigned to the settlement, and a schoolhouse and a church were completed in 1791. In 1788, when the settlement had a population of about one hundred, Fort Hunter Mohawk captains Kanonraron (Aaron Hill) and Anoghsoktea (Isaac Hill) came to the territory. They had left the Grand River settlement, as they resented the growing influence there of Joseph Brant and his policy of leasing land to white settlers among the Mohawk.

After repeated requests, including a petition to King George III by Sir John Johnson in 1785, the Mohawk who had settled at the Bay of Quinte were granted a 12 by 13-mile tract of land on the bay by Lieutenant Governor of Upper Canada John Graves Simcoe on April 1, 1793. This is affirmed in the Simcoe Deed, the Crown Grant to the Mohawks of the Bay of Quinte, and Treaty 3 1/2.

Near the end of the eighteenth century, factionalism broke out on the Territory, with Isaac Hill challenging Deserontyon's leadership. Hill's followers killed two of Deserontyon's relatives in confrontations. The community settled the issue in a council that took place from September 2 to 10, 1800, called by Deputy Superintendent of Indian Affairs William Claus. Hill agreed to recuse himself from the affairs of the Territory.

=== 19th century ===
Throughout the first few decades of the 19th century, the Mohawk on the Territory objected repeatedly to the government leasing land to white settlers that had been guaranteed to them in the Simcoe Deed. The leases were largely to conduct timber harvesting. The Mohawk were not given a share of the lease payments, nor any part in decisions about the leases. John Deserontyon died in January 1811.

After the end of the War of 1812 with the United States, a further wave of non-Indigenous settlement arrived in the area. A John Ferguson wrote to Claus in a letter dated March 5, 1819, expressing concern that in the purported Mohawk community were settlers who were "descendants of Germans; there is also a family of immediate descendants of Africans... [t]here are also some descendants of Americans."

From 1820 to 1843, the government of Canada allowed United Empire Loyalists (mostly white ethnic Europeans) to settle on the Territory, despite repeated appeals by the Mohawk for the government to remove the interlopers. By the end of that period, two-thirds of the land base was under private ownership, including an 800-acre tract of land sold circa 1836 to John Deserontyon's grandson, John Culbertson. This eventually became the townsite of Deseronto, Ontario (named after John Deserontyon).

Since the 1830s, the Mohawk have alleged that the private sale of that large parcel to Culbertson was illegal. They lost control of the parcel when third parties acquired interests, and it is now largely split between two townships. This dispute forms the basis of The Culbertson Tract Land Claim by this Mohawk First Nation, which was heard by the Federal Court in 2013.

In 1843, the Mohawk constructed the Gothic chapel Christ Church on the Territory. In 2004 Elizabeth II designated it as Her Majesty's Chapel Royal of the Mohawk; it is one of only six Royal Chapels outside Great Britain. This building replaced the earlier wooden church that was completed in 1794.

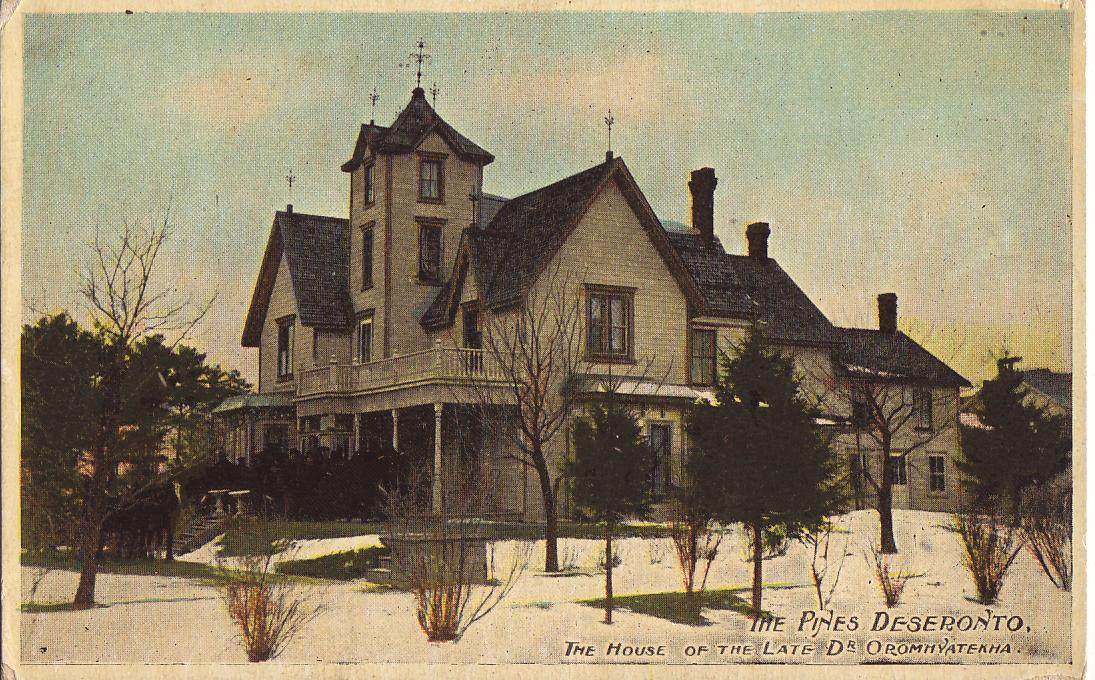
"The Pines", Dr. Oronhyatekha's home in Tyendinaga, c. 1909.

In 1860, Oronhyatekha came to teach at Tyendinaga after studying briefly at Kenyon College. In the subsequent years, he left the Territory to spend time at Six Nations. He also studied for a few months at the University of Oxford, at the recommendation of the Prince of Wales' personal physician, Henry Acland. He returned to Tyendinaga in 1863, and married Deyoronseh (Ellen Hill). His home in Tyendinaga was known as "The Pines". It was a palatial Victorian estate where he allowed only Mohawk to be spoken.

In April 1871, Oronhyatekha was appointed as the physician for Tyendinaga; he was also practising medicine in Napanee. His wife's family owned Captain John's Island in the Bay of Quinte, which Oronhyatekha renamed as Forester's Island (after the Independent Order of Foresters, a fraternal organization). He had been instrumental in expanding this fraternal order in the 1890s.

On the island, Oronhyatekha built two homes, several cottages, a hotel, a dining hall, a bandstand, and a wharf. He began the construction of an orphanage on the island in 1903, which was opened in 1906 before being sold in 1908. Oronhyatekha died in Savannah, Georgia in March 1907, a few months before his son Dr. Acland Oronhyatekha (also known as William Acland Heywood), Chief of the Mohawks of the Bay of Quinte, also died.

The first council election for the Mohawks of the Bay of Quinte band government, as established under the Gradual Enfranchisement Act of 1869, took place in October 1870. The first meeting of the first elected council took place December 10, 1870. The men listed as "chiefs" of that council were Sampson Green (Annosothkah, an alternate spelling of Isaac Hill's Mohawk name—Green was Hill's great-grandson), Archibald Culbertson, William J. W. Hill (a descendant of John Desorontyon and Joseph Brant Thayendanegea), John Loft (another descendant of Isaac Hill), Seth W. Hill (also a descendant of Isaac Hill), Cornelius Maricle, and John Claus. (The latter may have been a descendant of William Claus, earlier Deputy Superintendent of Indian Affairs.)

In the 1880s, four Federal Indian Day Schools were constructed on the territory: Eastern (also known as No. 1), Western (No. 2), and Central (No. 3) were opened in 1882, and Mission (No. 4) was opened in 1883. They all were affiliated with the Anglican Church of Canada, which often supplied staff and clergy. Eastern, Western, and Central were single-room schoolhouses. Earlier schools on the territory included the Upper Mohawk School, which was the third to be built on the territory, and which was operating in 1870.

=== 20th century ===
During World War One, the Canadian government established Camp Mohawk as a training airfield located on the territory near Deseronto. During the war, First Nations men training at Camp Mohawk were encouraged to speak in indigenous languages during their observation duties, as a form of code talking. The airfield eventually was transferred and adapted as Tyendinaga (Mohawk) Airport.

=== Changes in education ===
The Mission Indian Day School closed in 1956. The Quinte Mohawk Indian Day School was built around this time and opened on September 1, 1960. It was a federally-run day school (as opposed to a residential school, where students boarded during the school year) affiliated with the Anglican Church. It served students up to Grade 8.

Through the 1960s, First Nations activists worked to gain control of their children's education by having authority devolve from the government to the Nations to set up and operate their own school systems. They believed their children had been forced to abandon their native cultures and languages, and had suffered in family separations at boarding schools.

By 1971, negotiations were complete at Tyendinaga Territory for the Mohawk to found and construct a centralized elementary school building on York Road, to replace the overcrowded Quinte Mohawk Indian Day School. It would be large enough also to replace the three single-room schoolhouses: Eastern, Western, and Central Indian day schools. The Federal Indian Day School Class Action Lawsuit, which multiple First Nations filed against the federal government, noted that these schools were so poorly insulated that they had been closed as of September 1, 1969 because of such substandard conditions. The establishment of the new school, known as Quinte Mohawk School, proceeded after the federal government devolved authority for education of First Nations children to local First Nations control. Construction began on August 28, 1973, and the school opened in September 1974 with around 230 students.

First Nations Technical Institute (FNTI) was founded in 1985. It is an Indigenous-owned and controlled post-secondary institute on the Tyendinaga Mohawk Territory. Numerous First Nations have established such community colleges on their reserves to provide higher education for their members.

The Quinte Mohawk Indian Day School was closed on September 1, 1997. It was later named as one of the facilities (along with Eastern, Western, Central, and Mission) covered by the Federal Indian Schools Class Action Lawsuit (McLean v Canada (Court File No. T-2169-16)). This was an attempt by First Nations to recover compensation for former students at Federal Indian Day Schools and Federal Day Schools, who suffered abuse of all sorts through the federally-run education system.

=== 21st century ===
In February 2008, Health Canada advised the council to place a precautionary boil-water advisory on all groundwater-fed wells in the Territory. As of March 12, 2019, that advisory was still active.

==== 2020 railway protest ====
In February 2020, Tyendinaga Mohawk joined nationwide protests in solidarity with the hereditary chiefs of the Wetʼsuwetʼen, who were opposing the construction of the Coastal GasLink Pipeline through their territory in central British Columbia. On February 6, members of the Territory created a railway blockade by parking several vehicles near (but not on) a level crossing just north of the Territory on Wyman Road. Via Rail and Canadian National Railway (CNR) were forced to cancel service on vast parts of their continental network for the near month that the protest lasted. On February 21, some hereditary chiefs of the Wetʼsuwetʼen met and held a press conference with "Tyendinaga Mohawk people", reaffirming the solidarity between their nations in the face of human rights abuses and mistreatment at the hands of the police.

The Ontario Provincial Police (OPP) decided not to act immediately on several injunctions issued by CNR, but gave the protesters notice on February 23 to clear their encampment by midnight to avoid prosecution for disobeying the injunctions. The protesters stayed. The Ontario Police intervened, arresting several protesters on February 24. As of February 27, 2020, ten people were facing charges in connection resulting from the protest and disruption of rail traffic.

== Facilities ==
The main facilities of the reserve are located along York Road, where the band administration building, Quinte Mohawk School, and Kanhiote Public Library are located.

== Education ==
Tyendinaga Mohawk Territory is home to First Nations Technical Institute (FNTI), an educational partner with Canadore College, First Nations University of Canada, Humber College, Loyalist College, Queen's University, Ryerson University, St. Lawrence College, and Trent University. FNTI course offerings include programs in Aviation (in partnership with the Tyendinaga (Mohawk) Airport), Law, Public Relations, Indigenous Community Health, and the Mohawk language.

The Territory also has a primary school, Quinte Mohawk School, which opened in 1974. For secondary school, on-reserve residents have the option of attending East Side Secondary School in Belleville to the west of the Territory, or attending the Ohahase Learning Centre, a private secondary school operated by the First Nations Technical Institute. Ohahase means "new road" in the Mohawk language.

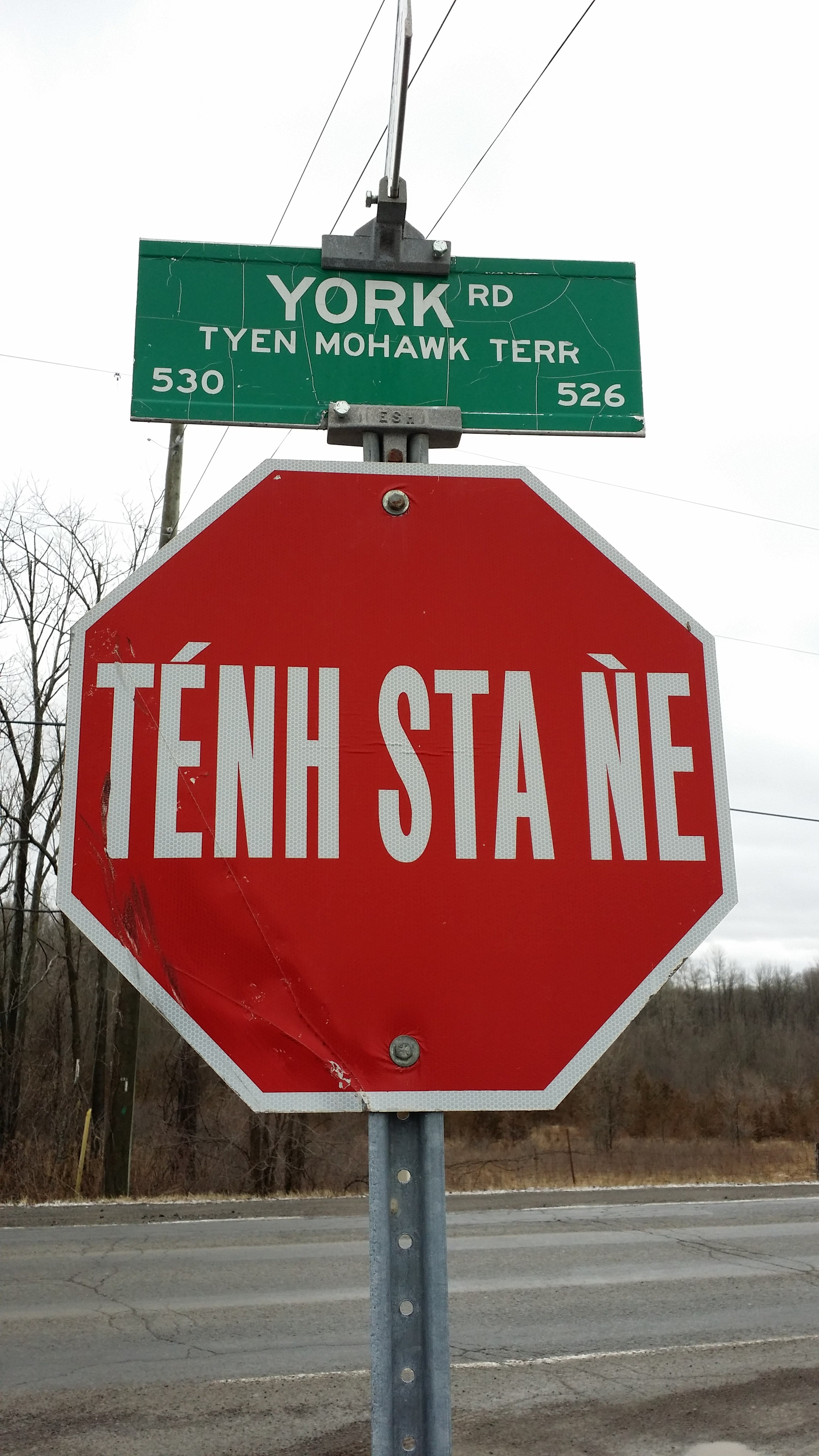
Mohawk language stop sign

The language group, Tsi Tyónnheht Onkwawén:na (TTO, Kanyen'kéha for "keeping our words alive") organizes a variety of cultural educational programs. These include language documentation efforts, a language immersion primary school, and a "language nest" for pre-school age children. TTO began as a grassroots community project in the 1990s in response to the endangered state of the Mohawk language in the Territory. In 2003 it was registered as a non-profit.

Since 2018, TTO has partnered with Queen's University to offer a Mohawk language and culture certificate program. In 2020, TTO collaborated with Woodland Cultural Centre in Brantford to republish twenty children's books originally written in the 1990s by David Kanatawakhon in the Tyendinaga dialect of Kanyen'kéha, as well as ten new colouring books. In January 2021, TTO launched a website and animated series, Learning with Tsitha, designed to help children learn Kanyen'kéha.

== Transport ==
The territory is connected to Ontario Highway 401 by Ontario Highway 49 which runs north–south through the reserve, south to Prince Edward. Tyendinaga Mohawk Airfield general aviation airport is located just west of Highway 49, just north of the Bay of Quinte.

== Media ==
A First Nations community-owned radio station, known as KWE Mohawk Nation Radio, operated on a frequency of 105.9 FM until early 2011. For a brief period, it operated on 88.3 FM. It relaunched in June 2012 on 89.5, but subsequently relocated to 92.3; it covers the area from Belleville to Deseronto. The station has no known callsign and has no relation to CKWE-FM, an independent First Nations community radio station in Maniwaki, Quebec. On May 5, 2023, Tsi Tyónnheht Onkwawén:na Language and Cultural Centre submitted an application for a broadcasting licence to operate an Indigenous (Type B Native) FM radio station in Tyendinaga Mohawk Territory. The station would operate at 89.5 MHz (channel 208A) with an effective radiated power (ERP) of 2,100 watts (non-directional antenna with an effective height of antenna above average terrain [EHAAT] of 52.1 metres). TTO received CRTC approval on November 15, 2023.

Tyendinaga has a second First Nations community-owned radio station that transmits at 87.9 MHz on the FM dial, known as "Real People’s Radio 87.9 FM".

The community does not publish its own newspaper.

== Population ==
Date	Total population	Reference
May 1784	100-125	
August 1836	319	
July 1872	757	
May 2016	2525	
