= ZFKP-FM =

ZFKP
- George Town; Cayman Islands
- Broadcast area: Grand Cayman, Cayman Islands
- Frequency: 87.9 MHz
- Branding: Praise 87.9

Programming
- Format: Christian

Ownership
- Owner: Cayman Islands Conference of Seventh-Day Adventist

History
- First air date: 18 December 2006
- Call sign meaning: ZF (ITU Prefix) Kayman Islands Praise

Technical information
- Transmitter coordinates: 19°18′N 81°23′W

Praise 87.9 (87.9 FM) is a radio station in the Cayman Islands in the British West Indies. The station is owned by the Cayman Islands Conference of Seventh-Day Adventist. It airs a Christian radio format. The station was founded by evangelist Everton Malcolm, a lay member of Newlands Adventist Church.

The station's license was issued on 15 June 2006 and amended on 6 March 2008.
