= Same-sex marriage in the Cayman Islands =

Same-sex marriage is not recognised in the Cayman Islands. A lawsuit successfully challenged the same-sex marriage ban in the Grand Court in March 2019. However, the Court of Appeal overturned this ruling in November 2019, and the Judicial Committee of the Privy Council dismissed an appeal in the case in March 2022. Civil partnerships have been legal since the enactment of the Civil Partnership Law on 4 September 2020 by Governor Martyn Roper. Same-sex marriages legally performed in other jurisdictions are recognised as civil partnerships in the Cayman Islands.

== Background ==
In 2006, the "People for Referendum" activist group began protesting same-sex marriage and LGBT rights in the Cayman Islands, after a Netherlands Antilles court ruled that Aruba had to recognise same-sex marriages registered in the Netherlands. The group criticised the judgement, arguing that the British Foreign and Commonwealth Office (FCO) could force legal recognition of same-sex marriages in the Cayman Islands in the future.

The Constitution of the Cayman Islands, approved in June 2009, notes that the government "shall respect" the right of every unmarried man and woman of marriageable age as defined by law to freely marry a person of the opposite sex and to found a family. However, the Constitution does not explicitly define the term "marriage" nor does it explicitly prohibit same-sex marriage. In August 2015, following the ruling in Oliari and Others v Italy—where the European Court of Human Rights (ECHR) held that the absence of legal recognition for same-sex couples was discriminatory—the Legislative Assembly unanimously passed a motion reaffirming the ban on same-sex marriage. The ECHR has jurisprudence over the Cayman Islands.

In 2015, Premier Alden McLaughlin stated that the government was reviewing immigration law to grant same-sex couples legally married in other jurisdictions the right to have their spouses recognised as dependants. In July 2016, the Immigration Appeals Tribunal ruled in favour of a gay man seeking such recognition. His application had been submitted 14 months prior, but had been rejected by immigration authorities. That same month, the European Court of Human Rights found that denying a residence permit to a same-sex couple in Italy on family grounds was unjustified discrimination—a decision with significant implications for the Cayman case. Despite this precedent, immigration authorities later refused to grant dependency rights to two dual Caymanian-British same-sex couples, forcing both couples to leave the Cayman Islands, even though one partner in each couple was a Caymanian citizen. On 6 October 2016, the Legislative Assembly voted 8–9 against holding a referendum on the legalisation of same-sex marriage. The measure was filed by MLA Anthony Eden after the Immigration Appeals Tribunal ruled to allow the same-sex partners of work permit holders to remain in the Cayman Islands as dependants. Premier McLaughlin expressed his opposition to the referendum proposal. In the weeks prior to the 2017 elections, legal expert Leo Raznovich invited same-sex couples to challenge the implicit ban on same-sex marriage in Cayman law, arguing that the lack of express prohibition in the Constitution and local legislation to same-sex marriage triggers sections 24 and 25 of the Constitution.

== Developments in 2018–2022 ==
=== 2019 ruling in Day & Bodden Bush ===
Homosexuality laws in Central America and the Caribbean Islands. Same-sex marriage Other type of partnership Unregistered cohabitation No recognition of same-sex couples Constitution limits marriage to opposite-sex couples Same-sex sexual activity illegal but law not enforced

In April 2018, a dual Caymanian-British same-sex couple, Chantelle Day and Vickie Bodden Bush, announced their intention to file a lawsuit challenging the Cayman Islands' statutory same-sex marriage ban. After their application to marry was rejected by the Cayman Islands General Registry on 13 April, the couple formally filed suit with the Grand Court on 20 June, arguing that the section of the Marriage Law defining marriage as between "one man and one woman" was incompatible with various rights guaranteed by the Constitution. Oral arguments in the case, Day & Bodden Bush v. Governor of the Cayman Islands et al., were heard by the court, specifically Chief Justice Anthony Smellie, in February 2019. During the arguments, government lawyers admitted that there was a persuasive case under the Constitution for same-sex couples to have a right to a civil union or domestic partnership scheme, though they argued that the creation of such a scheme should be left to legislators. On 29 March 2019, the court handed down its ruling in favour of the plaintiffs, finding that the ban on same-sex marriage was a clear violation of freedoms guaranteed in the Cayman Constitution, including the right to a private family life. Justice Smellie used his judicial powers to rewrite the Marriage Law, ordering that the clause specifying that marriage be reserved for heterosexual couples be altered to state, "'Marriage' means the union between two people as one another's spouses."

The ruling went into effect immediately and did not require ratification by the Legislative Assembly or Governor Martyn Roper. On 3 April 2019, Premier Alden McLaughlin announced that the government would appeal the decision and seek a stay of the judgement. The ruling was met with fierce opposition by Assembly members, who unanimously passed a motion expressing disagreement with the ruling and commending the decision to appeal. Several members vociferously objected to the ruling, with Representative Anthony Eden decrying "what is the difference between the Cayman Islands and Sodom and Gomorrah?", and Education Minister Julianna O'Connor-Connolly inviting members of the public to violently object to and disrupt the petitioners' marriage, saying "attend the marriage...[and] make sure you object" in person. The Court of Appeal granted the request to stay the ruling on 10 April 2019, thereby preventing the judgement from taking effect. The court heard the case on 28-30 August 2019, and on 7 November 2019 it overturned the Chief Justice's previous judgment. The court called on the Legislative Assembly to enact civil partnerships or a legal equivalent, as required by the European Court of Human Rights' decision in Oliari and Others v Italy and the Bill of Rights of the Constitution, and called on the United Kingdom to step in if the Cayman Government failed to do so. In January 2020, lawyers for the petitioning couple announced they had begun the process of filing an appeal with the Judicial Committee of the Privy Council.

=== Civil Partnership Law, 2020 ===
A domestic partnership bill was introduced to the Legislative Assembly on 26 June 2020. The legislation would have allowed same-sex and opposite-sex couples to register a domestic partnership, and enjoy several of the rights and benefits of marriage. Governor Martyn Roper called it "a welcome step on the path to ensuring that the rights of everyone in the territory are upheld and that Cayman law is compliant with the recent ruling of the Cayman Islands Court of Appeal". The bill was rejected by a 8–9 vote on 29 July, with MLA Kenneth Bryan who had previously expressed support for the bill eventually voting against it. Premier McLaughlin repeatedly indicated during parliamentary debates that failure to pass the bill would likely result in the Government of the United Kingdom stepping in and imposing domestic partnerships or same-sex marriage on the Cayman Islands.

29 July 2020 vote in the Legislative Assembly
Party	Voted for	Voted against	Absent (Did not vote)
People's Progressive Movement	5: Alden McLaughlin; David Wight; Joey Hew; Moses Kirkconnell; Roy McTaggart	1: Julianna O'Connor-Connolly	1: Barbara Conolly
Cayman Democratic Party	–	2: Bernie Bush; Eugene Banks	1: McKeeva Bush
Independent	3: Austin Harris; Ezzard Miller; Tara Rivers	6: Alva Suckoo; Anthony Eden; Arden McLean; Chris Saunders; Dwayne Seymour; Kenneth Bryan	–
Total	8	9	2
Total	42.1%	47.4%	10.5%

Reacting to the partnership bill's defeat, the Cayman News Service newspaper wrote that "it is extremely likely that Governor Martyn Roper or the Foreign and Commonwealth Office will intervene directly and either impose this legislation or even re-impose the chief justice's original ruling legalising same-sex marriage." On 30 July, Shadow Minister for Foreign and Commonwealth Affairs Stephen Doughty wrote to UK Overseas Territories Minister Liz Sugg urging Her Majesty's Government to step in. On 5 August, Sugg approved the use of the Governor's reserved powers under Section 81 of the Cayman Constitution to enact a law recognising same-sex civil partnerships. On 10 August, Governor Roper published a new version of the domestic partnership bill, along with consequential amendments to eleven other laws, that he would enact into law following a 21-day public consultation period. Following the consultation, the title of the union was changed from "domestic partnership" to "civil partnership". On 4 September 2020, Roper assented the Civil Partnership Law, 2020 and 11 consequential pieces of legislation, all of which came into effect that same day. Under the changes, civil partners are allowed to jointly adopt, share health insurance and enjoy other rights extended to married couples. Civil partnerships are open to both same-sex and opposite-sex couples. Premier McLaughlin said he felt "utterly humiliated" that the Government of the United Kingdom had been forced to intervene because of the Assembly's failure to pass the bill as required by the Court of Appeal. The first civil partnership to be registered in the Cayman Islands was that of Samantha Louise Erksine and Alice Hillman Lopez, who had their British marriage recognised as a partnership on 29 October 2020 in George Town.

The Cayman Islands recognises same-sex marriages legally performed in other jurisdictions as civil partnerships. In December 2020, the marriage of Paul Pearson and Randall Pinder, who were married in Ireland, was recognised by the Immigration Appeals Tribunal as equivalent to a civil partnership. The ruling stated that "recognising opposite-sex foreign marriages and failing to recognise same-sex foreign marriages would be affording different and unjustifiable treatment to different persons on the grounds of sexual orientation."

Following passage, a conservative Christian group filed a lawsuit, Kattina Anglin v. Governor of the Cayman Islands, challenging the legality of the civil partnership law. It argued that Governor Roper was not permitted to use his constitutional powers to implement the law. On 28 March 2022, Grand Court Judge Richard Williams ruled that Roper did not act unlawfully and that his actions were within his scope of responsibility considering the government's breach of the European Convention on Human Rights; "By this mechanism, the Constitution strikes a constitutional balance. In the circumstances where the Court of Appeal has so forcefully set out its expectations, it is understandable and reasonable for the Governor to have felt it necessary to enact the CPA [Civil Partnership Act] due to the long ongoing breach of the international obligation of the UK which otherwise would not have been adequately addressed by Parliament". The Privy Council upheld the partnership law in June 2025.

=== Appeal of Day & Bodden Bush to the Privy Council ===
In January 2020, lawyers for Chantelle Day and Vickie Bodden Bush announced they had begun the process of appealing the Court of Appeal's ruling to the Privy Council. The Council, with five members, Lord Reed, Lord Hodge, Lady Arden, Lord Sales and Dame Victoria Sharp, heard oral arguments in the case on 23 and 24 February 2021. On 14 March 2022, the Privy Council dismissed the appeal and ruled that the Constitution did not require the recognition of same-sex marriages. Activists expressed disappointment, with the president of Colours Cayman, Billie Bryan, saying: "The Privy Council has done nothing more, by its decision, than reassert the oppressive political environment of yesteryear."

Governor Roper said in a statement, "I must pay tribute to Chantelle and Vickie for their courage and determination in standing up for their rights over the last five years. They have inspired many through their actions. Same-sex marriage is legal throughout the United Kingdom and in several UK Overseas Territories. Going forward, it is a policy matter for the elected government as to whether it now wishes to introduce same-sex marriage in Cayman. That would provide equality between heterosexual and same-sex couples." Premier Wayne Panton said the ruling did not prevent the government from legalising same-sex marriage in the future, "Many of the younger generations of Caymanians have different views on the issue of marriage and this may become an issue of social justice in time to come." Panton also called for tolerance, "The issue of same-sex marriage is an emotive one in our Islands, with strong views held by those in support of and those against same-sex marriages. As we process the Privy Council's ruling, we must remember to conduct ourselves with respect and civility… No matter your view on the issue of same-sex marriage, I ask that you discuss your views respectfully and with due consideration to the feelings and emotions of others."

=== Attempts at legalisation by Westminster ===
In July 2022, Michael Cashman introduced legislation to the House of Lords to legalise same-sex marriage in the remaining six British Overseas Territories that banned it—Anguilla, Bermuda, the British Virgin Islands, the Cayman Islands, Montserrat and the Turks and Caicos Islands. The bill would "empower the Governor of each Territory to make changes to the law in the Territory to recognize the lawfulness of same-sex marriage and allow for the solemnization of marriage of same-sex couples." It had its first reading in the House of Lords on 6 July. Governor Roper said the measure had "little chance of progressing". This was not the first attempt to extend same-sex marriage rights to all British Overseas Territories; in February 2019, a Foreign Affairs Select Committee report recommended extending same-sex marriage to all territories with an Order in Council. At the time, the Leader of the Opposition in the Turks and Caicos Islands, Washington Misick, had accused the British Government of trying to "neutralise the authority" of the Caribbean territories. MP Chris Bryant accused territories of wanting to "have their cake and eat it": "You want to be under the British umbrella, but you do not want to be part of the British way of life."

== Statistics ==
By February 2021, 26 couples had registered a civil partnership in the Cayman Islands. This had increased to 47 couples by the end of 2021.

== Religious performance ==
The largest Christian denomination in the Cayman Islands is the Church of God, accounting for around 19% of the population according to the 2021 census. In 2015, the Church issued a statement that "[t]he Church of God (Chapel) in the Cayman Islands affirms the traditional, orthodox Christian understanding of sexuality, family and marriage, founded on the biblical narrative in Genesis and upheld by Jesus and the apostles in the New Testament." The Catholic Church, the second largest Christian denomination in the Cayman Islands, also opposes same-sex marriage and does not allow its priests to officiate at such marriages. In December 2023, the Holy See published Fiducia supplicans, a declaration allowing Catholic priests to bless couples who are not considered to be married according to church teaching, including the blessing of same-sex couples. Donald Chambers, the General Secretary of the Antilles Episcopal Conference, said in response that: "The spontaneous blessings are simply gestures that provide an effective means of increasing trust in God on the part of the person who asks. Hence the title, Fiducia supplicans literally means asking for trust." In April 2019, various Christian groups held a rally in George Town to protest the Supreme Court ruling in Godwin. The rally was attended by about 2,000 people according to the organizers. Many of the participants mistakingly referred to the Cayman Islands as "a Christian country".

== See also ==
- LGBTQ rights in the Cayman Islands
- Recognition of same-sex unions in the Americas
- Same-sex marriage in the United Kingdom
- Recognition of same-sex unions in the British Overseas Territories
- Same-sex union court cases
