= Tara Rivers =

Caymanian politician

The Honorable Tara Rivers
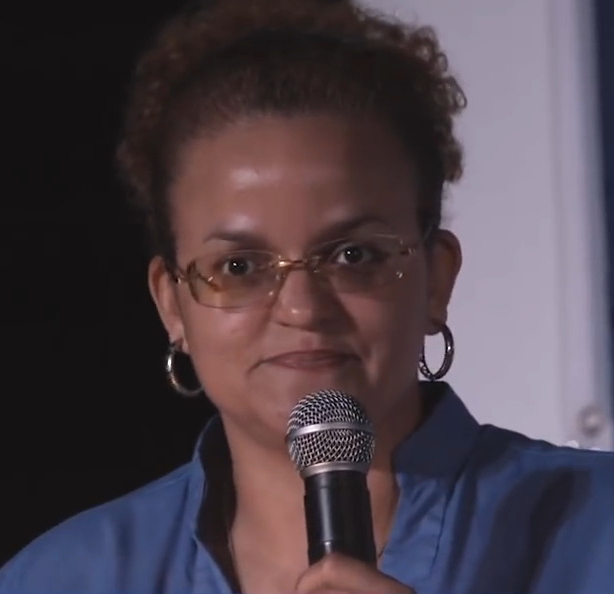
- Rivers in 2017

Minister of Financial Services and Home Affairs
- Incumbent
- Assumed office 24 May 2017
- Monarch: Elizabeth II
- Premier: Alden McLaughlin
- Governor: Helen Kilpatrick; Anwar Choudhury; Martyn Roper

Minister of Education
- In office 29 May 2013 – 24 May 2017
- Monarch: Elizabeth II
- Premier: Alden McLaughlin
- Governor: Helen Kilpatrick

Member of the Parliament of the Cayman Islands
- Incumbent
- Assumed office 29 May 2013
- Monarch: Elizabeth II
- Premier: Alden McLaughlin
- Governor: Helen Kilpatrick
- Constituency: West Bay South

Personal details
- Born: Tara Antoinette Rivers
- Website: Official website

Tara Rivers is a Caymanian politician, currently the Minister of Financial Services and Home Affairs, and previously the Minister of Education.

== Career ==
At the age of 15, she received a scholarship from United World Colleges. She attended Brandeis University in Waltham, Massachusetts, where she studied psychology. Rivers then went to York University in Toronto, Ontario, where she earned a degree in law at Osgoode Hall Law School and a Master of Business Administration (MBA) at Schulich School of Business. Following graduation, Rivers initially worked as a lawyer in London, before moving back to the Cayman Islands where she became a civil servant. During that period, she was involved in the national youth policy and helped to set up the Women's Resource Centre.

She stood for election at the Caymanian general election, 2013, in the West Bay South. Following election, she was named as the Minister for Education. During her time as Education Minister, there was a 42% increase in the number of students undertaking scholarships within the Cayman Islands. Following re-election at the 2017 general election, she became the new Minister of Financial Services and Home Affairs. She spoke of the issues with Cayman banks foreclosing on loans in November 2017. She was one of several Cayman politicians who had fake Facebook pages set up in order to solicit money from followers.
