= Elections in the Cayman Islands =

Elections in the Cayman Islands for Parliament are held in 19 single-member constituencies. Members of parliament are elected under a first-past-the-post system to four-year terms.

== Electoral system ==
The Cayman Islands has used a first-past-the-post system with single-member constituencies for their elections since 2017. Prior to 2017, elections were contested in constituencies following district lines, with the number of members elected by each district depending on its size, and with voters being able to cast as many votes as their district had members. Taking the 2012 referendum that saw over 65% of votes cast in favour of the change while failing to meet the requirement of a majority of eligible voters in favour for it to go into effect as an advisory referendum, the Alden McLaughlin government formed after the 2013 election managed to gain parliamentary support for putting the single-member system into place.

The 19 members of parliament are elected for a four-year term, and together with two ex officio members, the Deputy Governor and the Attorney-General, both appointed by the Governor, make up the Parliament of the Cayman Islands.

Grand Cayman has 17 of the constituencies, while one constituency covers the eastern part of Cayman Brac and the final one covering the western part of Cayman Brac and the entirety of Little Cayman. The boundaries of the constituencies were drawn in 2015, and since then the demographics of the Cayman Islands have shifted, leaving discrepancies in the number of registered voters in each constituency, being as low as 899 in East End and as high as 1,773 in West Bay South. A 2023 boundary commission report to address this was rejected by parliament in 2024 and again in 2025.

== Latest election ==
Map of electoral districts in the Cayman Islands

| Party | Votes | % | Seats | +/– |
|---|---|---|---|---|
| People's Progressive Movement | 5,044 | 27.37 | 7 | 0 |
| Caymanian Community Party | 4,953 | 26.88 | 4 | New |
| Cayman Islands National Party | 3,596 | 19.51 | 4 | New |
| Independent | 4,834 | 26.23 | 4 | –8 |
| Total | 18,427 | 100.00 | 19 | – |
| Valid votes | 18,427 | 98.74 | | |
| Invalid/blank votes | 236 | 1.26 | | |
| Total votes | 18,663 | 100.00 | | |
| Registered voters/turnout | 25,606 | 72.89 | | |
Source: Elections Office

== See also ==
- Electoral calendar
- Electoral system
