= 2013 Caymanian general election =

Historical election in the Cayman Islands

← 2009	22 May 2013	2017 →
- 18 seats in the Legislative Assembly of the Cayman Islands; 10 seats needed for a majority
- Turnout: 79.93%
Party	Leader	Vote %	Seats	+/–
PPM	Alden McLaughlin	36.07	9	+4
UDP	McKeeva Bush	27.75	3	−6
C4C		18.61	3	New
PNA	Juliana O'Connor-Connolly	5.67	1	New
Independents	–	11.90	2	+1
This lists parties that won seats. See the complete results below.
Premier before	Premier after
Juliana O'Connor-Connolly; PNA	Alden McLaughlin; PPM

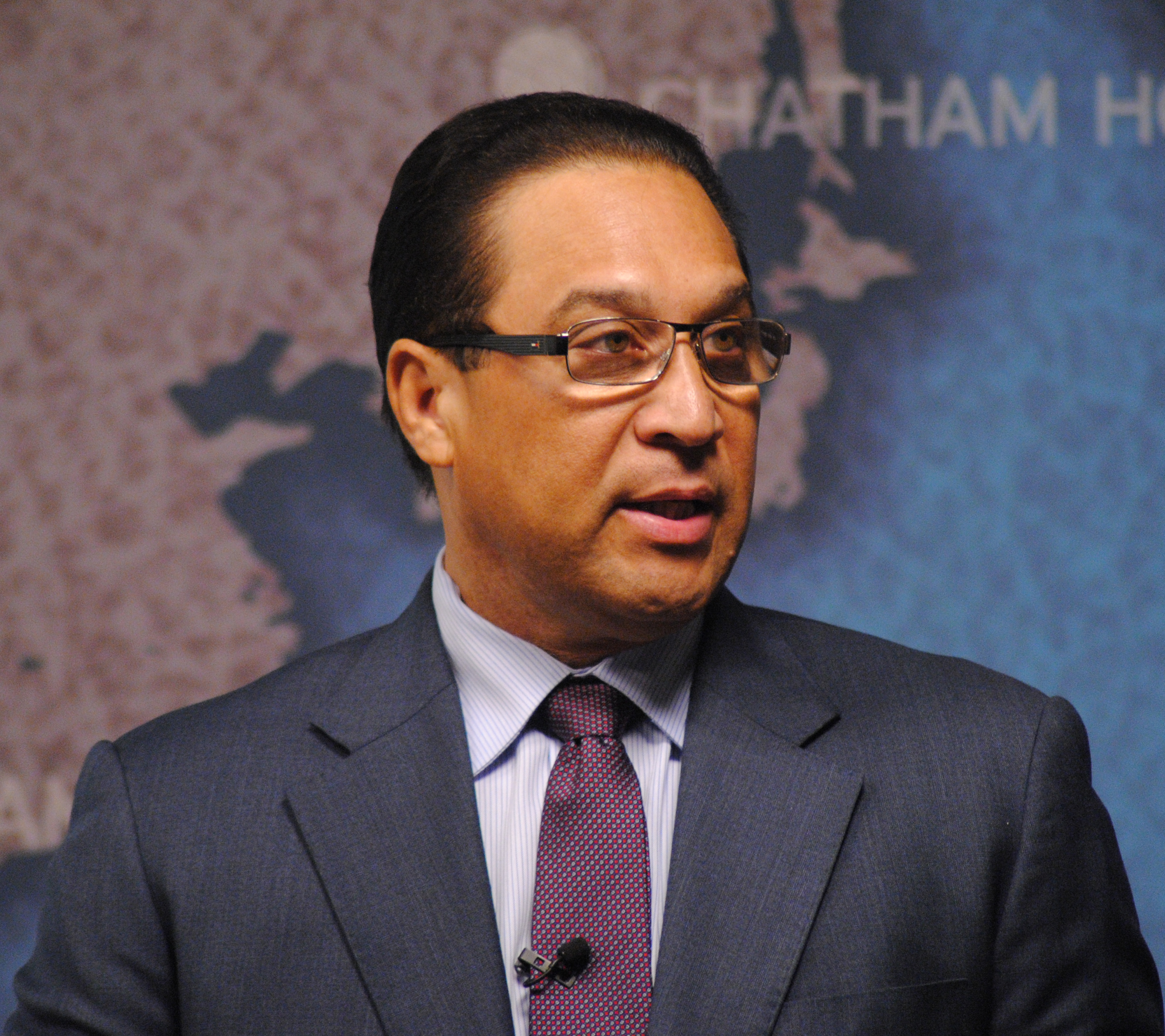
Progressive leader Alden McLaughlin, who formed a new government after the election.

General elections were held in the Cayman Islands on 22 May 2013. The incumbent United Democratic Party (UDP) government fell on a motion of non-confidence in December 2012 and was replaced by an interim government made up of former UDP members who formed the People's National Alliance (PNA). The main competition in the election was between the People's Progressive Movement (Progressives) and the UDP, with the PNA and a new political group the Coalition for Cayman (C4C) presenting an insufficient number of candidates to win a majority government.

The Progressives won half of the seats (9), with the UDP and C4C taking 3 each, and outgoing Premier of the Cayman Islands Juliana O'Connor-Connolly holding the only seat for the PNA. The two incumbent independents were also re-elected. Progressive leader Alden McLaughlin formed a new government.

== Background ==
In the 2009 elections, the United Democratic Party led by its founder and former Premier McKeeva Bush won a majority government. Bush returned to office as Premier until December 2012, when he lost a motion of confidence in the legislature. The confidence motion was triggered by a criminal investigation of Bush and was supported by the opposition People's Progressive Movement and dissident members of his own party, including members of the cabinet. A new government was formed by these dissidents, led by Bush's former deputy Juliana O'Connor-Connolly. Bush would later be charged with four counts of breach of trust, and five counts of theft. Bush continued to lead his party. O'Connor-Connolly and her cabinet formed their own party called the People's National Alliance, but only the five incumbent cabinet ministers stood as candidates under its banner. A fourth party, the Coalition for Cayman, put forward seven candidates, whilst 17 independents also contested the elections.

== Electoral system ==
The outgoing Legislative Assembly had 18 members, of which three were appointed (the Chief Secretary, the Attorney-General and the Financial Secretary) and 15 were elected. However, under constitutional changes passed in 2009, the new assembly will have 18 elected members. George Town gained 2 new seats, and Bodden Town gained one new seat. Each of the six districts forms a constituency, with six members elected in George Town, four each in West Bay and Bodden Town, two in Cayman Brac and Little Cayman and one in North Side and East End. The members of the multi-member districts are elected by plurality-at-large voting, where every voter can vote for as many candidates as there are seats.

== Results ==
The opposition Progressives more than doubled their seat count to 9, bringing them one seat short of an overall majority. Progressive leader Alden McLaughlin has said he will talk with Change for Cayman (C4C) and independent MLAs about the possibility of supporting his government. Another option would be having an opposition member become speaker, which would give the Progressives a majority of 9-8 among voting members.

The opposition United Democratic Party (UDP) lost 1 seat but was down 6 from their 2009 result, and failed to sweep the West Bay district for the first time in 12 years. The governing People's National Alliance, a breakaway group from the UDP, lost 4 of its 5 seats. C4C, a new political organization, won 3 seats, while incumbent independents Ezzard Miller and Arden McLean (a former Progressive) held their seats.

Party	Votes	%	Seats	+/–
People's Progressive Movement	21,859	36.07	9	+4
United Democratic Party	16,816	27.75	3	–6
Coalition for Cayman	11,275	18.61	3	New
People's National Alliance	3,436	5.67	1	New
Independents	7,212	11.90	2	+1
Total	60,598	100.00	18	+3
Total votes	14,760	–		
Registered voters/turnout	18,492	79.82		
Source: Elections Office

=== By district ===
District	Candidate	Party	Votes	%
Bodden Town	Anthony Eden	People's Progressive Movement	1,781	49.57
Bodden Town	Osbourne Bodden	People's Progressive Movement	1,615	44.95
Bodden Town	Wayne Panton	People's Progressive Movement	1,571	43.72
Bodden Town	Alva Suckoo	People's Progressive Movement	1,393	38.77
Bodden Town	Maureen Pitcairn	United Democratic Party	1,352	37.63
Bodden Town	Charles Clifford	Independent	1,220	33.95
Bodden Town	Christopher Saunders	United Democratic Party	1,098	30.56
Bodden Town	Mark Scotland	People's National Alliance	864	24.05
Bodden Town	Dwayne Seymour	People's National Alliance	712	19.82
Bodden Town	Errington Webster	Independent	512	14.25
Bodden Town	Arnold Berry	Independent	206	5.73
Bodden Town	Gregg Anderson	Independent	192	5.34
Bodden Town	Vincent Frederick	Independent	136	3.79
Cayman Brac and Little Cayman	Moses Kirkconnell	People's Progressive Movement	628	75.21
Cayman Brac and Little Cayman	Julianna O'Connor-Connolly	People's National Alliance	461	55.21
Cayman Brac and Little Cayman	David Bodden	Independent	186	22.28
Cayman Brac and Little Cayman	Maxine McCoy-Moore	Independent	93	11.14
East End	Arden McLean	Independent	317	57.22
East End	John McLean	Independent	237	42.78
George Town	Kurt Tibbetts	People's Progressive Movement	2,470	42.38
George Town	Roy McTaggart	Coalition for Cayman	2,160	37.06
George Town	Alden McLaughlin	People's Progressive Movement	2,145	36.81
George Town	Marco Archer	People's Progressive Movement	2,085	35.78
George Town	Winston Conolly	Coalition for Cayman	2,039	34.99
George Town	Joseph Hew	People's Progressive Movement	1,940	33.29
George Town	Michael Adam	United Democratic Party	1,889	32.41
George Town	Sharon Roulstone	Coalition for Cayman	1,812	31.09
George Town	Lucille Seymour	People's Progressive Movement	1,768	30.34
George Town	Kenneth Bryan	People's Progressive Movement	1,735	29.77
George Town	Jude Scott	Coalition for Cayman	1,681	28.84
George Town	Derrington Miller	Independent	1,590	27.28
George Town	Ellio Solomon	United Democratic Party	1,528	26.22
George Town	Jonathan Piercy	United Democratic Party	1,439	24.69
George Town	Walling Whittaker	United Democratic Party	1,413	24.25
George Town	Renard Moxam	United Democratic Party	1,345	23.08
George Town	Rayal Bodden	United Democratic Party	1,330	22.82
George Town	Stefan Baraud	Independent	1,124	19.29
George Town	Jaqueline Hayes	Coalition for Cayman	1,035	17.76
George Town	Frank McField	Independent	211	3.62
George Town	Mathew Leslie	Independent	91	1.56
North Side	Ezzard Miller	Independent	326	70.11
North Side	Joseph Ebanks	Independent	139	29.89
West Bay	McKeeva Bush	United Democratic Party	1,583	47.27
West Bay	Tara Rivers	Coalition for Cayman	1,483	44.28
West Bay	Bernie Bush	United Democratic Party	1,460	43.60
West Bay	Eugene Ebanks	United Democratic Party	1,307	39.03
West Bay	Velma Powery-Hewitt	United Democratic Party	1,072	32.01
West Bay	Mervin Smith	Coalition for Cayman	1,065	31.80
West Bay	Woody DaCosta	People's Progressive Movement	855	25.53
West Bay	Rolston Anglin	People's National Alliance	782	23.35
West Bay	Ray Farrington	People's Progressive Movement	671	20.04
West Bay	Dalkeith Bothwell	People's Progressive Movement	650	19.41
West Bay	Cline Glidden	People's National Alliance	617	18.42
West Bay	Bryan Ebanks	People's Progressive Movement	552	16.48
West Bay	Dwene Ebanks	Independent	370	11.05
West Bay	Andrea Christian	Independent	262	7.82

== Aftermath ==
=== Government formation ===
No party won an overall majority, but with the Progressives winning half of the seats and three times more seats than any other grouping, they're expected to form the government, either on their own or in coalition with independent members. It is expected that the government will be formed within a week of the election.

Independent members-elect from the C4C group and others had held preliminary talks among themselves to see about forming a coalition government with the Progressives. However, Alden McLaughlin's Progressives have secured a workable majority in the legislature by getting the agreement of outgoing premier Juliana O'Connor-Connolly to serve as speaker, leaving the Progressives a 9-8 majority of ordinarily voting members. McLaughlin held a news conference on Saturday May 25 naming the Progressives that would sit in cabinet and also indicating that he had asked C4C-backed MLA Tara Rivers to join the cabinet, which would give the government a 10-7 working majority. Thereafter, Rivers held a public meeting to assess her constituents views on whether to join the cabinet, the public was nearly unanimous in supporting her to join. Following Rivers public meeting, the two other C4C MLAs indicated that they would reconsider their previous announcement not to join the government. As a result, McLaughlin cancelled a planned morning news conference on Tuesday May 28 in order to have further discussions with the C4C MLAs with an eye to a potential Progressives/C4C coalition government.

Later Tuesday, it was announced that O'Connor-Connolly would join the Progressive caucus despite earlier statements that she would not do so when she was announced as speaker. As a result, the Progressives have a true majority of 10-8 allowing them to be appointed to government by the Governor of the Cayman Islands without a vote of the legislature. Thereafter, McLaughlin announced the full make-up of his cabinet, including a portfolio for C4C MLA Tara Rivers. McLaughlin also announced that C4C MLA Winston Connolly would sit in the government caucus and play a role in Rivers' ministry in a non-cabinet position and that the government would support the other C4C MLA Roy McTaggart for chair of the Public Accounts Committee. Two weeks after the election, McTaggart crossed the floor to sit with his C4C colleagues in the government caucus, accordingly he will have to step down from his position as Chairman of Public Accounts, a post always occupied by an opposition member. This leaves the government with a 13-5 majority.

=== Electoral reform ===
This will be the last election under the block voting system as a result of the election of the Progressives. Progressive leader Alden McLaughlin reiterated his commitment after the election to move to a "one man one vote" system with a single-member electoral districts. McLaughlin will use the result of the non-binding 2012 referendum on such a system rather than holding a new referendum.

=== Eligibility challenges ===
After the results of the vote, the husband of the fifth-place finisher in the West Bay electoral district Velma Powery-Hewitt, filed a suit in the Grand Court of the Cayman Islands challenging the eligibility of Tara Rivers to have run and serve in the legislative assembly. Had the challenge been successful, Powery-Hewitt stood to take Rivers' seat in the legislature.

The Cayman Islands constitution forbids election to the legislative assembly to a person:

- not born in the Cayman Islands from having been absent from the Cayman Islands for more than 400 days in the preceding 7 years, unless it was for government service, service at air or at sea, or for educational or medical reasons.
- who holds another citizenship "save for any right he or she may have to some other citizenship by virtue of his or her birth outside the Cayman Islands."

The challenger argued that Rivers had been absent to the UK for more than 400 days where Rivers worked at a law firm. Rivers argued that her work at the law firm included extensive training and that it should be deemed "attendance as a student at (an) educational establishment" as permitted by the constitution. The challenger also argued that by applying for and receiving a U.S. passport, to which Rivers was entitled by virtue of having been born there, she was express allegiance to the United States and was therefore ineligible under the restrictions against dual citizenship. Rivers argued that no allegiance was given in exchange for the passport and that she was required by law as a U.S. citizen to enter the U.S. using a U.S. passport, not the passport of another country.

The court ruled with Rivers and she was allowed to keep her seat. This prompted some complaint from others who did not present themselves as candidates though they had the same qualifications as Rivers but were advised they were ineligible to run by elections officials, and by an individual who had renounced her U.S. citizenship believing she had to do so to run. Powery-Hewitt's husband later attempted to appeal the decision, but as the Constitution states that electoral questions are the sole jurisdiction of the Grand Court, the Court of Appeal declined to hear the case.
