= Moses Kirkconnell =

Caymanian politician

The Honourable Moses Kirkconnell OBE

Deputy Premier of the Cayman Islands
- In office 29 May 2013 – 21 April 2021
- Monarch: Elizabeth II
- Governor: Helen Kilpatrick; Anwar Choudhury; Martyn Roper
- Succeeded by: Christopher Saunders

Member of the Parliament of the Cayman Islands
- Incumbent
- Assumed office 18 May 2005
- Constituency: Cayman Brac West and Little Cayman

Personal details
- Born: Cayman Brac, Cayman Islands
- Party: People's Progressive Movement

Moses Ian Kirkconnell III OBE is a Caymanian politician and former Deputy Premier of the Cayman Islands. He is the member of Parliament of the Cayman Islands for Cayman Brac West and Little Cayman currently serving his fifth term. Kirkconnell is a member of the People's Progressive Movement party.

== Political career ==
He was re-elected in the 2021 Caymanian general election.

Kirkconnell was appointed Officer of the Order of the British Empire (OBE) in the 2024 New Year Honours for services to the Caymanian people, the tourism industry and district administration in the Cayman Islands.

In February 2025, he announced that he would not seek re-election to Parliament.

== Family ==
His mother was Zita Foster Kirkconnell (died in 2019 at the age of 92). His uncle was Captain Eldon Kirkconnell, founder of Kirk Freeport and a former legislator (died in 2023 at the age of 96).
