= 2009 Caymanian general election =

← 2005	20 May 2009	2013 →
- 15 seats in the Legislative Assembly; 8 seats needed for a majority
Party	Leader	Vote %	Seats	+/–
UDP	McKeeva Bush	44.47	9	+4
PPM	Kurt Tibbetts	29.38	5	−4
Independent		26.15	1	0
This lists parties that won seats. See the complete results below.
Leader of Government Business before	Leader of Government Business after
Kurt Tibbetts; PPM	McKeeva Bush; UDP

General elections were held in the Cayman Islands on 20 May 2009 alongside a referendum on a draft constitution. The opposition United Democratic Party defeated the incumbent People's Progressive Movement.

== Results ==
Party	Votes	%	Seats	+/–
United Democratic Party	17,629	44.47	9	+4
People's Progressive Movement	11,645	29.38	5	–4
Independents	10,366	26.15	1	0
Total	39,640	100.00	15	0
Total votes	12,204	–		
Registered voters/turnout	15,338	79.57		
Source: Elections Office

=== By district ===
District	Candidate	Party	Votes	%
Bodden Town	Mark Scotland	United Democratic Party	1,453	51.62
Bodden Town	Anthony Eden	People's Progressive Movement	1,394	49.52
Bodden Town	Dwayne Seymour	United Democratic Party	1,030	36.59
Bodden Town	Osbourne Bodden	People's Progressive Movement	992	35.24
Bodden Town	Charles Clifford	People's Progressive Movement	932	33.11
Bodden Town	Theresa Lewis-Pitcairn	Independent	896	31.83
Bodden Town	Gilbert McLean	Independent	546	19.40
Bodden Town	Justin Woods	Independent	486	17.26
Bodden Town	Sandra Catron	Independent	144	5.12
Bodden Town	Vincent R. Frederick	Independent	113	4.01
Cayman Brac and Little Cayman	Moses Ian Kirkconnell	People's Progressive Movement	473	59.05
Cayman Brac and Little Cayman	Julianna O'Connor-Connolly	United Democratic Party	467	58.30
Cayman Brac and Little Cayman	Lyndon Leathon Martin	Independent	300	37.45
Cayman Brac and Little Cayman	Maxine Avon Moore-Mccoy	Independent	80	9.99
East End	Arden McLean	People's Progressive Movement	304	59.61
East End	John Bonwell McLean Jr.	Independent	206	40.39
George Town	Kurt Tibbetts	People's Progressive Movement	2,181	47.68
George Town	Mike Adam	United Democratic Party	2,110	46.13
George Town	Alden McLaughlin	People's Progressive Movement	2,081	45.50
George Town	Ellio Solomon	United Democratic Party	1,845	40.34
George Town	Jonathan Piercy	United Democratic Party	1,658	36.25
George Town	Lucille Dell Seymour	People's Progressive Movement	1,631	35.66
George Town	Alfonso Wright	People's Progressive Movement	1,472	32.18
George Town	Pearlina McGaw-Lumsden	United Democratic Party	1,413	30.89
George Town	C. Walling Whittaker	Independent	981	21.45
George Town	Derrington Bo Miller	Independent	808	17.67
George Town	W. Burns Conolly	Independent	784	17.14
George Town	Eddie Kendall Thompson	Independent	510	11.15
George Town	Frank Swarres McField	Independent	216	4.72
North Side	Denison Ezzard Miller	Independent	253	50.80
North Side	Joseph Ebanks	People's Progressive Movement	185	37.15
North Side	Oswell M. Rankine	Independent	60	12.05
West Bay	McKeeva Bush	United Democratic Party	2,152	71.59
West Bay	Rolston Anglin	United Democratic Party	2,049	68.16
West Bay	Cline Glidden	United Democratic Party	1,818	60.48
West Bay	A. Eugene Ebanks	United Democratic Party	1,634	54.36
West Bay	Bernie A. Bush	Independent	1,193	39.69
West Bay	Woodward Jerome Dacosta	Independent	875	29.11
West Bay	Paul Desmond Rivers	Independent	741	24.65
West Bay	Reginald Delapenha	Independent	627	20.86
West Bay	Lana Mae Smith	Independent	411	13.67
West Bay	Henry Ormon Morgan	Independent	107	3.56
West Bay	Dora Elizabeth Ebanks	Independent	29	0.96
