= 2021 Caymanian general election =

- 14 April 2021
- 19 seats in the Parliament of the Cayman Islands; 10 seats needed for a majority
- Turnout: 73.76%
| Party | Leader | Vote % | Seats | +/– |
|---|---|---|---|---|
| PPM | Roy McTaggart | 19.60 | 7 | 0 |
| Independents | – | 79.14 | 12 | +3 |
This lists parties that won seats. See the complete results below.
Results by constituency
| Premier before | Premier after |
|---|---|
| Alden McLaughlin; PPM | G. Wayne Panton; Independent |

General elections were held in the Cayman Islands on 14 April 2021 to elect the 19 members of the Parliament. The elections were originally set to be held on 26 May, but Premier Alden McLaughlin asked Governor Martyn Roper to dissolve Parliament on 14 February, triggering early elections. The move was made in order to avoid a no-confidence motion against Speaker McKeeva Bush, who had received a two-month suspended jail sentence in December 2020 for assaulting a woman in February 2020.

== Results ==
The ruling Progressives won seven seats, and with the backing of an affiliated independent, were seen as in a good position to form a government. The opposition had mixed fortunes, with longtime MP and Opposition Leader Arden McLean losing his seat and Alric Lindsay, who was a potential Speaker in a proposed Wayne Panton-led opposition coalition, narrowly lost George Town South to incumbent Progressive Barbara Conolly. However, Panton, a former Progressive MP viewed as the most likely candidate to lead an independent government, was elected and enough independents won seats to potentially form a government. For other opposition groups, longtime MP and leader of the newly formed Cayman Islands People's Party Ezzard Miller lost in North Side, former Democratic Party leader McKeeva Bush was re-elected as an independent by only 27 votes, while his longtime partner Eugene Ebanks lost decisively.

| Party | Votes | % | Seats | +/– |
|---|---|---|---|---|
| People's Progressive Movement | 3,380 | 19.60 | 7 | 0 |
| Cayman Islands People's Party | 217 | 1.26 | 0 | New |
| Independents | 13,650 | 79.14 | 12 | +3 |
| Total | 17,247 | 100.00 | 19 | 0 |
| Valid votes | 17,247 | 99.10 | | |
| Invalid/blank votes | 157 | 0.90 | | |
| Total votes | 17,404 | 100.00 | | |
| Registered voters/turnout | 23,594 | 73.76 | | |
Source: Elections Office

=== By constituency ===
| Constituency | Electorate | Turnout | % | Candidate | Party | Votes | % |
|---|---|---|---|---|---|---|---|
| Bodden Town East | 1,663 | 1,207 | 72.58 | Dwayne Stanley Seymour | Independent | 735 | 60.89 |
| Bodden Town East | 1,663 | 1,207 | 72.58 | Osbourne Vendryes Bodden | Independent | 472 | 39.11 |
| Bodden Town West | 1,590 | 1,133 | 71.26 | Christopher Selvin Saunders | Independent | 902 | 79.61 |
| Bodden Town West | 1,590 | 1,133 | 71.26 | Vincent Reynaldo Frederick | Independent | 231 | 20.39 |
| Cayman Brac East | 476 | 373 | 78.36 | Julianna O'Connor-Connolly | People's Progressive Movement | 266 | 71.31 |
| Cayman Brac East | 476 | 373 | 78.36 | Elvis Jeffery McKeever | Independent | 107 | 28.69 |
| Cayman Brac West & Little Cayman | 580 | 367 | 63.28 | Moses Ian Kirkconnell | People's Progressive Movement | 315 | 85.83 |
| Cayman Brac West & Little Cayman | 580 | 367 | 63.28 | Maxine Avon McCoy-Moore | Independent | 52 | 14.17 |
| East End | 769 | 667 | 86.74 | Isaac Douglas Rankine | Independent | 348 | 52.17 |
| East End | 769 | 667 | 86.74 | V. Arden McLean | Independent | 304 | 45.58 |
| East End | 769 | 667 | 86.74 | McCleary Dwight Frederick | Independent | 15 | 2.25 |
| George Town Central | 1,404 | 977 | 85.97 | Kenneth Vernon Bryan | Independent | 851 | 87.10 |
| George Town Central | 1,404 | 977 | 85.97 | Frank Anthony Cornwall | People's Progressive Movement | 126 | 12.90 |
| George Town East | 1,458 | 1,006 | 69.00 | Roy Michael McTaggart | People's Progressive Movement | 645 | 64.12 |
| George Town East | 1,458 | 1,006 | 69.00 | Emily Cecelia Ann DeCou | Independent | 217 | 21.57 |
| George Town East | 1,458 | 1,006 | 69.00 | Christina Hislop Rowlandson | Independent | 76 | 7.55 |
| George Town East | 1,458 | 1,006 | 69.00 | Frank Swarres McField | Independent | 61 | 6.06 |
| George Town East | 1,458 | 1,006 | 69.00 | Richard Alexander Bernard | Independent | 7 | 0.70 |
| George Town North | 1,296 | 907 | 69.98 | Joseph Xavier Hew | People's Progressive Movement | 512 | 56.45 |
| George Town North | 1,296 | 907 | 69.98 | Renard Johann Moxam | Independent | 395 | 43.55 |
| George Town South | 1,335 | 994 | 74.46 | Barbara Conolly | People's Progressive Movement | 524 | 52.72 |
| George Town South | 1,335 | 994 | 74.46 | Alric Lindsay | Independent | 470 | 47.28 |
| George Town West | 1.283 | 888 | 69.21 | David Charles Wight | People's Progressive Movement | 457 | 51.46 |
| George Town West | 1.283 | 888 | 69.21 | Pearlina McGaw-Lumsden | Independent | 198 | 22.30 |
| George Town West | 1.283 | 888 | 69.21 | Ellio Anthony Solomon | Independent | 135 | 15.20 |
| George Town West | 1.283 | 888 | 69.21 | Kenrick Herbert Webster | Independent | 98 | 11.04 |
| Newlands | 1,487 | 1,186 | 79.76 | G. Wayne Panton | Independent | 655 | 55.23 |
| Newlands | 1,487 | 1,186 | 79.76 | Alva Suckoo | Independent | 346 | 29.17 |
| Newlands | 1,487 | 1,186 | 79.76 | Raul Gonzales Jr. | Independent | 156 | 13.15 |
| Newlands | 1,487 | 1,186 | 79.76 | Roydell Alston Carter | Independent | 29 | 2.45 |
| North Side | 836 | 718 | 85.89 | Johany S. Ebanks | Independent | 394 | 54.87 |
| North Side | 836 | 718 | 85.89 | Denison Ezzard Miller | Cayman Islands People's Party | 217 | 30.22 |
| North Side | 836 | 718 | 85.89 | Justin Craig Ebanks | Independent | 84 | 11.70 |
| North Side | 836 | 718 | 85.89 | Debra Lolita Broderick | Independent | 23 | 3.20 |
| Prospect | 1,339 | 948 | 70.80 | Sabrina Theresa Turner | Independent | 353 | 37.24 |
| Prospect | 1,339 | 948 | 70.80 | Michael Steven Myles | Independent | 307 | 32.38 |
| Prospect | 1,339 | 948 | 70.80 | Austin Osmond Harris Jr. | Independent | 288 | 30.38 |
| Red Bay | 1,320 | 960 | 72.73 | Alden McLaughlin | People's Progressive Movement | 535 | 55.73 |
| Red Bay | 1,320 | 960 | 72.73 | James Samuel Jackson | Independent | 425 | 44.27 |
| Savannah | 1,466 | 1,047 | 71.42 | Heather Dianne Bodden | Independent | 577 | 55.11 |
| Savannah | 1,466 | 1,047 | 71.42 | Malcolm Anthony Eden | Independent | 442 | 42.22 |
| Savannah | 1,466 | 1,047 | 71.42 | Jeanna Williams | Independent | 28 | 2.67 |
| West Bay Central | 1,181 | 931 | 78.83 | Katherine Ebanks-Wilks | Independent | 539 | 57.89 |
| West Bay Central | 1,181 | 931 | 78.83 | Eugene Ebanks | Independent | 392 | 42.11 |
| West Bay North | 1,311 | 944 | 72.01 | Bernie Alfredo Bush | Independent | 515 | 54.56 |
| West Bay North | 1,311 | 944 | 72.01 | Rolston Malachi Anglin | Independent | 429 | 45.44 |
| West Bay South | 1,535 | 1,105 | 71.99 | André Martin Ebanks | Independent | 796 | 72.04 |
| West Bay South | 1,535 | 1,105 | 71.99 | Raul Nicholoson-Coe | Independent | 309 | 27.96 |
| West Bay West | 1,265 | 889 | 70.28 | McKeeva Bush | Independent | 458 | 51.52 |
| West Bay West | 1,265 | 889 | 70.28 | Mario E. Ebanks | Independent | 431 | 48.48 |
Source: Elections Office

== Government formation ==
On election night, Progressive leader Roy McTaggart said he was "overjoyed" with the result and hopeful that a Progressive-led coalition of twelve to fourteen MPs could be formed, based on the close affiliation of independent MP Dwayne Seymour along with a perceived agreement with two other independent MPs – Isaac Rankine and Jay Ebanks. Outgoing Progressive Premier Alden McLaughlin named Rankine, Jay Ebanks, André Ebanks, and Heather Bodden as the independents that the Progressives hoped to work with but the next day added that nothing definitive had been agreed to. Independent PM contender Wayne Panton was also optimistic about forming a government, saying "the intention is to have a discussion amongst the independents to work to see if we can put together a government." On 15 April, the day after the election, both camps (Progressive and Panton's Independents) were calling MPs to try to get ten supporters.

In the afternoon of 15 April, Panton announced that ten independents had come together to form a government referred to as PACT for "People-driven, Accountable, Competent and Transparent." He then met with Governor Martyn Roper along with Deputy Governor Franz Manderson and Attorney General Samuel Bulgin to deliver a letter signed by the group to confirm that Panton has the support of the majority. The alliance planned to back Chris Saunders as Deputy Premier along with Alric Lindsay as Speaker, despite the fact that he failed to win a seat. Panton asked the Governor to call a session of Parliament for 21 April for the swearing-in of MPs and for him to be elected Premier. The news was met with shock from the Progressives as Rankine, Jay Ebanks, André Ebanks, and Bodden were all signatories; McTaggart quickly claimed that negotiations were still open between the Progressives and some independents in the hope of reassembling the coalition. The Progressives also claimed that they "had arrangements with Isaac Rankine and Jay Ebanks for them to help to form the government when they won," calling the PACT coalition into question.

In the early morning of 16 April, McTaggart announced that he actually had the support of the majority of MPs, sending a letter from eleven MPs (although Jay Ebanks' did not sign it) to the Governor. The switches from the PACT agreement to the Progressive coalition were Rankine, Jay Ebanks, and Prospect MP Sabrina Turner. Panton was shocked by the turn of events saying that Rankine, Jay Ebanks, and Turner had not spoken to him on why they reneged from the PACT agreement; the Cayman News Service reported that Rankine and Turner had been pressured by campaign donors to work with the Progressives. If the deal remained, it would give the Progressives the 10 seats needed to take power with or without Jay Ebanks.

However, in another turn of events, during the day of 16 April, a PACT meeting was held with Panton, Turner, Jay Ebanks, and five other independents along with McKeeva Bush, the former Democratic Party leader and Speaker of the House whose assault conviction led to the early elections. The preliminary talks of 15 April made it seem like neither a potential Progressives-led coalition nor the Panton-led PACT would include Bush, as several candidates on both sides had promised to not work with Bush while running; however, the new agreements made it so that Bush was caught in between the two groups with his vote potentially being vital. Two other notable attendees at the PACT meeting, Sabrina Turner and Jay Ebanks, were included in the Progressive letter and both did not comment on their position after the meeting but Turner called a constituency meeting at the Seafarers Hall in her Prospect district. Neither Bush nor Panton spoke on Bush's position either, and Panton deferred to Turner's meeting for comments on her position.

At the Seafarers Hall, Turner confirmed her return to the PACT, saying "I am proud to be a member of the independent government." The reversal was done with the attendance of all those at the earlier meeting, barring Bush and Jay Ebanks who were not mentioned as PACT members. However, independent MP Kenneth Bryan spoke up to call on Isaac Rankine's return to the coalition, urging people to call him in favor of the PACT. Although Panton referred to himself as "Premier-designate" and Governor Roper confirmed that no others (including McTaggart) had made a formal request to form a government, neither PACT nor the Progressives were able to bring forward a clear 10 MPs needed to gain a majority with both having roughly 9 MPs and McKeeva Bush in neither.

On 17 April, PACT leader Panton and Progressive leader McTaggart met to discuss a potential coalition between their two groups, however, the meeting ended after fifteen minutes with Panton claiming that McTaggart had not “accepted the results of the elections” and McTaggart calling it "“presumptuous” that Panton’s press releases stated they were issued by the “Office of the Premier Designate”" on 18 April. McTaggart also attacked Panton on hypocrisy grounds, saying that Panton's attacks on McLaughlin for not removing Bush were ironic since Panton was seen meeting with Bush on 16 April. McTaggart also said that neither PACT nor his own Progressives held a majority and that since the Progressives did not run in every district, the independents could not claim to have a mandate.

On 19 April, Panton announced a deal with McKeeva Bush, the tenth MP to support PACT; the deal would return Bush to the Speakership and was predicated on Bush enacting a parliamentary code of conduct “where any infractions would lead to immediate dismissal from their position.” The agreement also coincided with an apology from Bush for the assault that led to early election and a commitment to donate 10% of his salary to the Cayman Islands Crisis Centre, a women's shelter (Crisis Centre later declined this offer). Panton's statement thanked "Premier McLaughlin and his team for their service" and announced the other members of his proposed cabinet: Saunders as Deputy Premier and Bodden as a parliamentary secretary along with Bryan, Turner, West Bay North MP-elect Bernie A. Bush, West Bay Central MP-elect Katherine Ebanks-Wilks, Jay Ebanks (who returned to the PACT), and André Ebanks as ministers. The Progressives responded by again calling into question whether Panton held a majority by noting that Speakers only can vote in the event of a tie and the convention in Westminster systems is for the Speaker to vote "to preserve the status quo, not to pass legislation or to elect a new Premier." The Panton-McKeeva Bush agreement was also called a U-turn as Panton had cited the Progressives’ failure to end the coalition with Bush's Democratic Party over his conviction for assault, as one of the reasons for his decision to leave the Progressives prior to the election. Taura Ebanks, the founder of Cayman Voices - a group pushing against Bush and backing his victim through the #sheissupported movement, called the deal where several MPs who opposed Bush during the campaign welcomed his addition to the PACT "simply too high a price to pay."

Finally, on 20 April, Governor of the Cayman Islands Martyn Roper met with Panton's proposed cabinet and set the date for the swearing-in of both MPs and Cabinet ministers for the next day. A statement from Roper's Facebook account stated that Panton presented a revised letter of support including "the signatures of 10 elected persons currently supporting Mr Panton’s leadership of a new Government." Panton thanked "Governor Roper and his team for all the assistance and guidance provided during this transition" and announced that Irma Arch, the Managing Director of Miracle Brokers and not an MP, would be Speaker for the inauguration day therefore allowing Bush to vote for Panton without invoking Speaker Denison's rule.

On 21 April, PPM MP and former Premier Julianna O'Connor-Connolly along with Rankine left the Progressive alliance and joined the new Panton government, solidifying the PACT majority at 12 to 7 and its working majority (as the Speaker usually does not vote) at 11 to 7. O'Connor-Connolly justified her switch in a letter to her party by saying that "Cayman Brac and Little Cayman need a Minister in the Government" and that she had requested Panton offer more seats to Progressives; in response, PPM Chairman McLaughlin called her defection, "disappointing but not entirely unexpected." Rankine returned to the PACT as he had campaigned on being in government; McLaughlin responded to his departure more amicably, saying "once it was clear that we could not form the government, he [Rankine] had to honour his campaign pledge to be part of the government."

Later on 21 April, Panton was sworn in as Premier after winning the vote by acclamation since he was the only MP nominated for the role. In his public speech, Panton touched on "the environment, climate change resiliency, affordable healthcare, good governance and cost of living" along with imploring the nation to move on from the divisiveness of the election. Beforehand, Bush was sworn in as Speaker after defeating Progressive MP Barbara Connolly in a secret ballot, 12-7, and fellow PACT member Katherine Ebanks-Wilks also defeated Connolly, 11-7, in the Deputy Speaker race. All MPs and the full cabinet were also swore in.
