= 2012 Caymanian electoral system referendum =

- 18 July 2012
- Do you support on electoral system of single-member constituencies with each elector being entitled to cast only one vote?

Results
Choice	Votes	%
Yes	5,631	65.23%
No	3,001	34.77%
Valid votes	8,632	99.49%
Invalid or blank votes	44	0.51%
Total votes	8,676	100.00%
Registered voters/turnout	15,161	57.23%

A referendum on changing the electoral system was held in the Cayman Islands on 18 July 2012. Voters were asked whether they wish to change the electoral system from one using multi-member constituencies to one with single member constituencies. Although the proposal was approved by a majority of those voting, the quorum of half of registered voters voting in favour was not met.

== Background ==
The ruling United Democratic Party (UDP) had promised to hold a referendum on the change to the system alongside the general elections in 2013. However, a citizens' initiative group sought an earlier vote so that the new system would be in place for the 2013 elections. The group began collecting the 3,800 signatures required (25% of registered voters) to force a referendum, but as they were close to passing 3,000 signatures, on 11 April 2012 the UDP chose to hold the referendum on an earlier date. On 10 May the Legislative Assembly confirmed the format of the referendum.

Under article 69 of the constitution, a referendum was only binding if a majority of the 15,161 registered voters vote in favour. Voting was held between 07:00 and 18:00, and referendum day was made a public holiday by the government.

== Results ==
Do you support on electoral system of single-member constituencies with each elector being entitled to cast only one vote?

Choice	Votes	%
For	5,631	65.23
Against	3,001	34.77
Total	8,632	100.00
Valid votes	8,632	99.49
Invalid/blank votes	44	0.51
Total votes	8,676	100.00
Registered voters/turnout	15,161	57.23
Source: Elections Office

== Aftermath ==
Although the Elections Office had said that the government should take a majority vote that failed to pass the quorum as advisory, Premier McKeeva Bush announced after the referendum that he would not do so. Eventually the electoral system was changed to single member constituencies for the 2017 election.
