= Barbara Conolly =

Cayman Islands politician

Barbara Conolly JP MP

Personal details
- Born: Barbara Elizabeth Conolly Cayman Islands

Barbara Elizabeth Conolly is a Cayman Islands politician from the People's Progressive Movement.

== Education ==
Conolly graduated from the University College of the Cayman Islands.

== Political career ==
She was first elected to the Parliament of the Cayman Islands representing George Town South in the 2017 Caymanian general election and was re-elected in 2021.

In 2019, Conolly was elected deputy speaker. In 2021, she stood again for speaker and deputy speaker but was not selected.

In Parliament she is a member of the Public Accounts Committee and also Shadow Minister for Education and Social Development on the opposition benches.

== Personal life ==
She has two children and two grandchildren.
