= 1988 Caymanian general election =

- November 1988
- 12 seats in the Legislative Assembly; 7 seats needed for a majority
Party	Leader	Seats	+/–
Progress with Dignity	Norman Bodden	7	+4
Independents		5	−4
This lists parties that won seats. See the complete results below.

General elections were held in the Cayman Islands in November 1988. The result was a victory for the Progress with Dignity Team led by Norman Bodden, which won seven of the twelve elected seats.

== Results ==
Party	Votes	%	Seats	+/–
Progress with Dignity Team			7	+4
Team for National Unity			0	0
Independents			5	–4
Total			12	0
Valid votes	6,917	97.48		
Invalid/blank votes	179	2.52		
Total votes	7,096	100.00		
Registered voters/turnout	9,455	75.05		
Source: Elections Office

=== By district ===
District	Candidate	Votes	%
Bodden Town	Roy Bodden	755	70.69
Bodden Town	Franklin R. Smith	645	60.39
Bodden Town	Haig Bodden	422	39.51
Bodden Town	Charles W. Walter	302	28.28
Cayman Brac and Little Cayman	Marby S. Kirkconnell	345	52.67
Cayman Brac and Little Cayman	Gilbert McLean	343	52.37
Cayman Brac and Little Cayman	Trevor Ewan Foster	296	45.19
Cayman Brac and Little Cayman	Ernest Foster	137	20.92
Cayman Brac and Little Cayman	Elvern K. Hurslton	40	6.11
Cayman Brac and Little Cayman	Percival T. Whorms Sr.	27	4.12
East End	John Bonwell McLean Sr.	Unopposed	
George Town	William Norman Bodden	1,711	65.06
George Town	Linford Ainsworth Pierson	1,523	57.91
George Town	Truman M. Bodden	1,450	55.13
George Town	Kurt Tibbetts	1,135	43.16
George Town	Eldon Rankin	913	34.71
George Town	George C. Smith	844	32.09
North Side	Ezzard Miller	212	50.48
North Side	Edna Moyle	208	49.52
West Bay	McKeeva Bush	1,316	61.38
West Bay	Benson Obadiah Ebanks	1,137	53.03
West Bay	John Dwight Jefferson Jr.	1,020	47.57
West Bay	Daphne Louise Orrett	1,004	46.83
West Bay	Dalmain Dunstan Ebanks	1,001	46.69
West Bay	John Garston Smith	854	39.83
