= Coalition for Cayman =

Political party on the Cayman Islands

The Coalition for Cayman (C4C) was a political party on the Cayman Islands that took part in the Caymanian general election 2013. They received 18.6% and won 3 seats in the Legislative Assembly.
