= Newlands, Cayman Islands =

Suburb of Savannah, Cayman Islands

Coordinates: 19°17′N 81°18′W

Newlands is a suburb in the town of Savannah, which is located in the district of Bodden Town, Cayman Islands. It is a 15-minute drive from the capital of the Cayman Islands, George Town. The former Premier of the Cayman Islands, Wayne Panton, is from Newlands and represents their electoral district. Newlands is also the location of the International College of the Cayman Islands, and the Joint Marine Unit for the Royal Cayman Islands Police Service.
