= 1996 Caymanian general election =

- 20 November 1996
- 15 seats in the Legislative Assembly; 8 seats needed for a majority
Party	Leader	Vote %	Seats	+/–
National Team	Truman Bodden	48.08	9	−3
Democratic Alliance	Kurt Tibbetts	19.95	2	New
Team Cayman		17.82	1	New
Independent		14.14	3	0
This lists parties that won seats. See the complete results below.
Leader of Government Business before	Leader of Government Business after
Truman Bodden; Independent	Truman Bodden; Independent

General elections were held in the Cayman Islands on 20 November 1996. The result was a victory for the ruling National Team, which won 9 of the 15 seats in the Legislative Assembly.

== Results ==
Party	Votes	%	Seats	+/–
National Team	12,210	48.08	9	–3
Democratic Alliance	5,067	19.95	2	New
Team Cayman	4,526	17.82	1	New
Independents	3,592	14.14	3	0
Total	25,395	100.00	15	0
Valid votes	8,872	99.32		
Invalid/blank votes	61	0.68		
Total votes	8,933	100.00		
Registered voters/turnout	10,450	85.48		
Source: Elections Today, Winter 1997
