= 2009 Caymanian constitutional referendum =

| 20 May 2009 |
- Do you approve the draft constitution which was agreed by the Cayman Islands constitution delegation and the government of the United Kingdom on 5th February, 2009 and tabled in the Legislative Assembly of the Cayman Islands on 11th February, 2009?

Results
| Choice | Votes | % |
|---|---|---|
| Yes | 7,045 | 63.06% |
| No | 4,127 | 36.94% |
| Valid votes | 11,172 | 99.36% |
| Invalid or blank votes | 72 | 0.64% |
| Total votes | 11,244 | 100.00% |
| Registered voters/turnout | 15,361 | 73.2% |

A referendum on a draft constitution was held in the Cayman Islands on 20 May 2009 alongside general elections. The new constitution was approved by 63% of voters, and by the Privy Council on 10 June.

== Background ==
Since around 2000 the Cayman Islands had sought a new constitution, in order to cement the United Kingdom's possession of the islands. On 22 May 2008 the Caymanian government had announced the question and that it was aiming to hold the referendum in July. However, following an announcement on 27 June, the referendum was postponed until the 2009 general elections in order to give time to negotiate and agree the constitution with the UK. The negotiations took place in January and February 2009 and a consultation started in the islands on 11 February 2009.

On 24 February the Legislative Assembly passed the Referendum (Constitutional Modernisation) Bill, 2009. The referendum was to be held in accordance with Article 29, paragraph 2 of the constitution, and required a majority to pass.

== Results ==
Do you approve the draft constitution which was agreed by the Cayman Islands constitution delegation and the government of the United Kingdom on 5th February, 2009 and tabled in the Legislative Assembly of the Cayman Islands on 11th February, 2009?

| Choice | Votes | % |
|---|---|---|
| For | 7,045 | 63.06 |
| Against | 4,127 | 36.94 |
| Invalid/blank votes | 72 | – |
| Total | 11,244 | 100 |
| Registered voters/turnout | 15,361 | 73.42 |
Source: Direct Democracy
