= Government of the Cayman Islands =

The Cayman Islands is a parliamentary representative democratic dependency. As a British Overseas Territories, King Charles III is the head of state. The Premier of the Cayman Islands is the head of government. Executive power is exercised by the government, legislative power is vested in both the government and the Parliament of the Cayman Islands. The judiciary is independent of the executive and the legislature.

The Cayman Islands' physical isolation under early British colonial rule allowed the development of an indigenous set of administrative and legal traditions which were codified into a constitution in 1959. A constitution, which devolved some authority from the United Kingdom to the Cayman Islands Government, was passed by referendum on 20 May 2009. Subsequently, the islands have become largely self-governing.

The Cayman Islands Government is aided by a tradition of restrained civil governance from the United Kingdom.

== Executive branch ==
The Cabinet is appointed by the Governor on the advice of the premier.

The British Crown appoints a Governor, who is recruited from the UK Foreign & Commonwealth Office and serves as the British representative. This role includes acting as the direct viceregal representative of the King of the United Kingdom. Daily administration of the islands is conducted by the Cabinet.

The Deputy Governor of the Cayman Islands, and the Attorney-General of the Cayman Islands are appointed by the Governor. Responsibility for defence and foreign affairs resides with the United Kingdom; however, the Deputy Governor handles the Portfolio of the Civil Service, and the Cayman Islands Government may negotiate certain bilateral matters directly with foreign governments.

The Governor can exercise complete executive authority through reserve powers afforded to His Majesty's Government in the Constitution. However, the governor must consult with the Premier prior to using such powers and must do so in the interest of the Cayman Islands (so long as it doesn't prejudice British interests). The governor must give royal assent to all legislation, which provides the power to strike down any law the legislature may see fit for the country. In modern times, the Governor usually allows the country to be run by the Cabinet, and the civil service to be run by the Deputy Governor, who is also the Acting Governor when the Governor is not able to discharge their usual duties for one reason or another under a dormant commission, such as through illness or absence. The Governor of the Cayman Islands is Jane Owen and the Deputy Governor is the Honourable Franz Manderson.

List of Ministers:

- Premier of the Cayman Islands and Minister for Sustainability and Climate Resiliency: Hon. Andre Ebanks
- Deputy Premier of the Cayman Islands and Minister for Finance, Economic Development and Labour: Hon. Christopher Saunders
- Minister of Education, District Administration, Lands and Survey: Hon. Juliana O'Connor-Connolly
- Minister for Tourism and Transport: Hon. Kenneth V. Bryan
- Minister for Home Affairs, Youth, Sports, Culture and Heritage: Hon. Bernie Bush
- Minister for Planning, Agriculture, Housing, and Infrastructure: Hon. Johanny Ebanks
- Minister for Financial Services, Commerce, Investment, Innovation and Social Development: Hon. Andre Ebanks
- Minister for Health and Wellness: Hon. Sabrina Turner

== Legislative branch ==
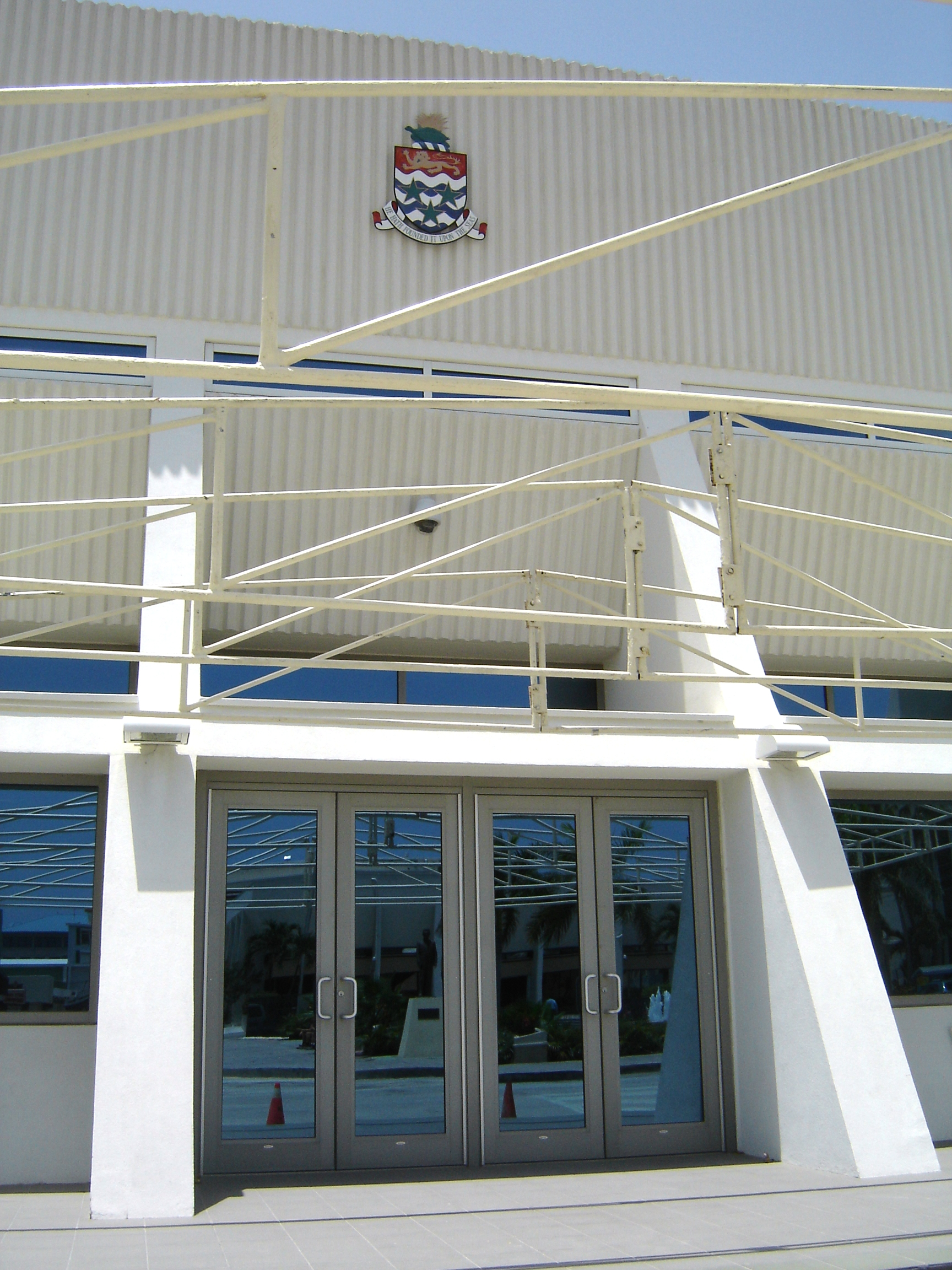
The Legislative Assembly building in George Town

The unicameral Parliament of the Cayman Islands is presided over by an independent Speaker. The Parliament has 19 elected members. Elections are held at the discretion of the Governor at least every 4 years. Members of the Parliament may introduce bills which, if passed, are then approved, returned, or disallowed by the Governor. The British Government also reserves the right to disallow bills approved by the Governor. The Premier is limited to two consecutive terms, after which the individual who was Premier for two terms must sit out a term before being constitutionally eligible to be Premier again. The Premier is Andre Ebanks.

== Judicial branch ==
The four-tiered judicial system is based on English common law, colonial and local statutes. The Cayman Islands Court of Appeal is the highest court in the Islands, but a final appeal may be heard by the Judicial Committee of the Privy Council sitting in London.

The Grand Court, ranking below the Cayman Islands Court of Appeal, was first created in 1877 as a court of special limited jurisdiction by statute. It was established in its present form by the Grand Court Law of 1975, and became a constitutional court in 1984. It is a superior court of record of first instance, having unlimited jurisdiction in both criminal and civil matters, except when it sits as an appellate court from the lower courts or other tribunals. Grand Court judges sit either alone, or with a jury of either seven or, for murder and money laundering trials, 12.

It consists of three divisions:

- Admiralty Division – deals with maritime law
- Family Division – deals with family law, as well as marriage and children
- Financial Services Division

The Grand Court is headed by the Chief Justice of the Cayman Islands, who is appointed by the Governor on advice from the Judicial Service Commission. The current Chief Justice is The Honourable Margaret Ramsay-Hale.

The Financial Services Division of the Grand Court was created in 2009, and is a specialized commercial court track dealing with complex commercial and financial matters.

=== List of Chief Judges of the modern Grand Court ===
Incumbent	Tenure		Notes
Incumbent	Took office	Left office	Notes
Locksley Trevor Moody	1977	1978	First Chief Justice of the Grand Court
Sir John Crampton Summerfield	1978	1988	
Gerald Collet	1988	1990	
Sir Denis Malone	1990	1992	
George Eliot Harre	1993	1998	
Sir Anthony Smellie	1998	2022	
Margaret Ramsay-Hale	2022		

== Administrative divisions ==
Districts: George Town, Bodden Town, West Bay, North Side, East End, Sister Islands (Cayman Brac and Little Cayman)

== International organisation participation ==
Caricom (associate), CDB, Commonwealth Games Federation, Interpol (subbureau), IOC, United Kingdom Overseas Territories Association (UKOTA). The Cayman Islands are part of the Commonwealth of Nations, but it is covered under the U.K.'s membership, as are all other British Overseas Territories.

== History ==
From 2002 to 2005, the Government of the Cayman Islands sent some delinquent youth to Tranquility Bay, a privately operated World Wide Association of Specialty Programs and Schools facility in Jamaica. The government funded the students as they were located in the centre.

== See also ==
- Elections in the Cayman Islands
- Politics of the Cayman Islands
