= Sabrina Turner =

Politician from the Cayman Islands

Sabrina Theresa Syms Turner (née Fennell) is an independent politician from the Cayman Islands. Turner grew up in George Town. She has been the member of the Parliament of the Cayman Islands for Prospect since the 2021 Caymanian general election. During the COVID-19 pandemic in the Cayman Islands, she served as health minister.

== Loan from Wayne Panton ==
In 2023 it became public that Turner had received a CI$1.64 million bridging loan from then-premier Wayne Panton to help her acquire a new home. The agreement was drafted by lawyers and registered with the land registry. Turner declared the loan on the Register of Interests, though without identifying Panton as the lender. Panton stated that he was not required to declare it under the existing legislation.

The loan drew scrutiny from opposition figures and former colleagues due to concerns about the appearance of a conflict of interest. Panton maintained that the arrangement had no political conditions and was unrelated to the post-election negotiations of 2021. Commentators noted that Turner later joined the Cabinet that voted to remove Panton from office, suggesting the loan did not influence her political decisions.
