= Julianna O'Connor-Connolly =

Premier of the Cayman Islands

The Honourable Juliana Yvonne O'Connor-Connolly
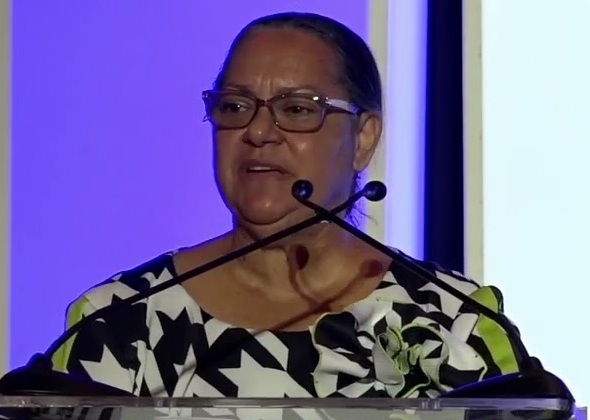
- O'Connor-Connolly in 2024

Premier of the Cayman Islands
- In office 15 November 2023 – 6 May 2025
- Monarch: Charles III
- Governor: Jane Owen
- Preceded by: Wayne Panton
- Succeeded by: André Ebanks
- In office 19 December 2012 – 29 May 2013
- Monarch: Elizabeth II
- Governor: Duncan Taylor
- Preceded by: McKeeva Bush
- Succeeded by: Alden McLaughlin

Speaker of the Legislative Assembly of the Cayman Islands
- In office 29 May 2013 – 24 May 2017
- Monarch: Elizabeth II
- Governor: Duncan Taylor; Helen Kilpatrick
- Preceded by: Mary Lawrence
- Succeeded by: McKeeva Bush
- In office 8 November 2001 – 31 October 2003
- Monarch: Elizabeth II
- Governor: Peter Smith; Bruce Dinwiddy
- Preceded by: Mabry S. Kirkconnell
- Succeeded by: Linford A. Pierson

Member of the Parliament of the Cayman Islands
- Incumbent
- Assumed office November 1996
- Constituency: Cayman Brac East

Personal details
- Born: Juliana O'Connor Cayman Brac, Cayman Islands
- Party: People's Progressive Movement (2013–2021, 2025–present)
- Other political affiliations: United Democratic Party (2001–2012); United People’s Movement (2023–2025)

Juliana Yvonne O'Connor-Connolly is a Caymanian politician who served as Premier of the Cayman Islands from December 2012 to May 2013 and again from November 2023 to May 2025 . She served as Speaker of the Legislative Assembly of the Cayman Islands from November 2001 to October 2003 and again from May 2013 to May 2017.

O'Connor-Connolly was the first-ever female Premier of the Cayman Islands, serving as Premier of from 19 December 2012 until 29 May 2013. Prior to becoming Premier, she was the territory's Deputy Premier serving from November 2009 until December 2012.

Following the 2013 Cayman Islands general election she crossed the floor to join the People's Progressive Movement party and in May 2013 she was appointed as Speaker of the Cayman Islands Legislative Assembly, leaving this post in May 2017. Following the 2017 Cayman Islands general election She is served as Minister of Education, Youth, Sports, Agriculture and Lands.

During debate in the Legislative Assembly, following the same-sex marriage ruling by Chief Justice Anthony Smellie on 29 March 2019, O'Connor-Connolly described the day of the ruling as "black Friday" for the Cayman Islands. She encouraged Caymanians to do what they could to object to the planned wedding between two women, even to the point of interrupting the wedding itself. The Education Minister had used the morning prayer before the debate to refer to "cruise passengers with alternative lifestyles" causing the streets of George Town to resemble Sodom and Gomorrah.

The education minister has been a fervent opponent of the Domestic Partnership Bill and any legislation that supported same-sex couples' right to a private life; describing it as "this evil that is being forced upon us". She was one of two Cabinet ministers who voted against the legislation brought by government in July to address the longstanding breach by the Caymanian authorities of Cayman's Bill of Rights and the European Convention on Human Rights.

Following the 2021 Cayman Islands general election, she again crossed the floor to align with a group of independents to form a government on the morning before Parliament had its first sitting, citing that "her constituents have expressed in no uncertain terms that Cayman Brac and Little Cayman need a Minister in the Government".

In 2023, she founded the United People's Movement and became Premier replacing Wayne Panton.

In March 2025, she rejoined the People's Progressive Movement.

== Footnotes ==
Political offices
Preceded by McKeeva Bush	Premier of the Cayman Islands; 2012–2013	Succeeded by Alden McLaughlin
Preceded by Wayne Panton	Premier of the Cayman Islands; 2023–2025	Succeeded by André Ebanks
