= Wayne Panton =

Caymanian politician

The Honourable Wayne Panton MP
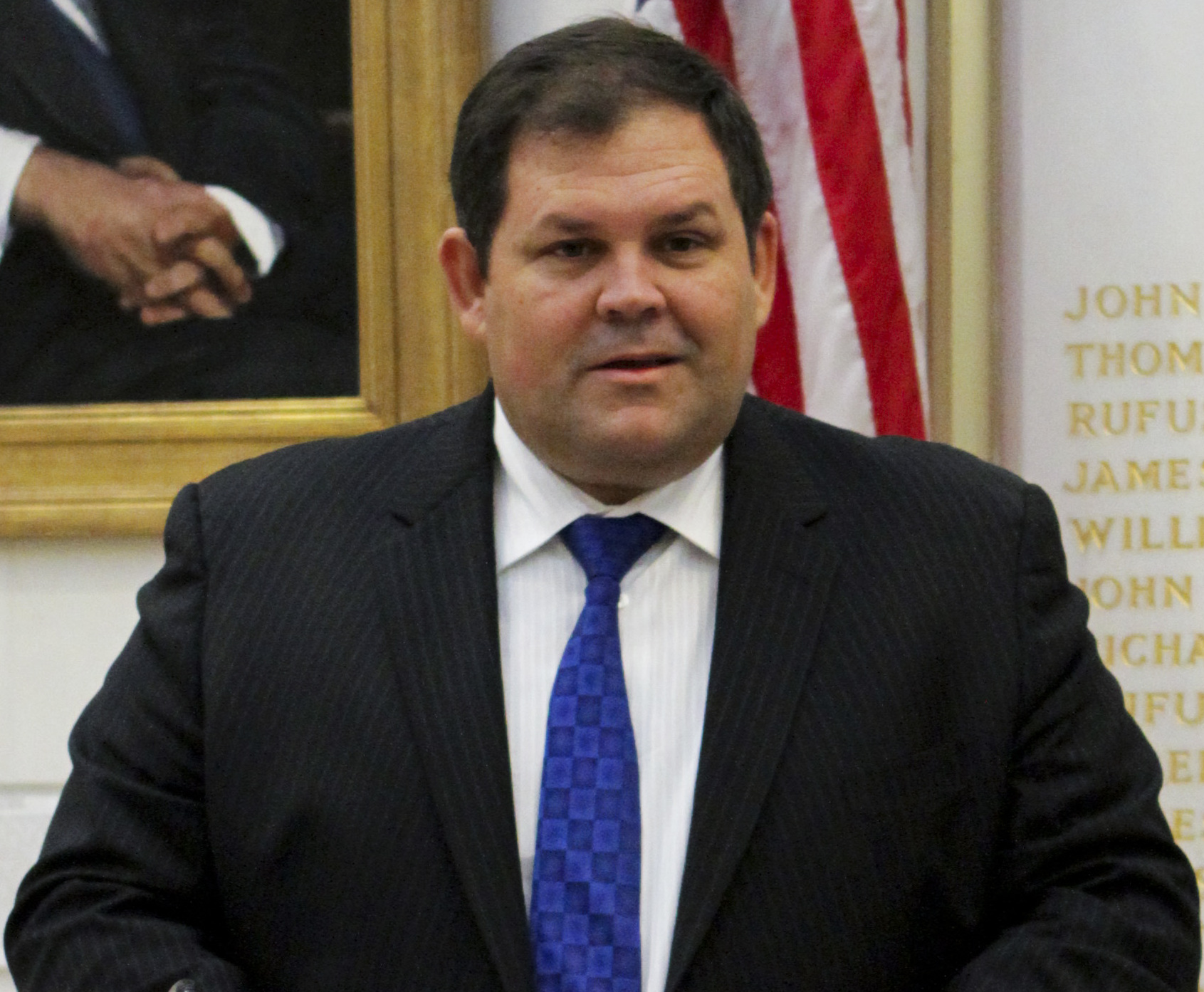
- Panton in 2013

Premier of the Cayman Islands
- In office 21 April 2021 – 15 November 2023
- Monarchs: Elizabeth II; Charles III
- Governor: Martyn Roper; Jane Owen
- Preceded by: Alden McLaughlin
- Succeeded by: Julianna O'Connor-Connolly

Personal details
- Education: Cayman Islands Law School

G. Wayne Panton is a Caymanian politician who served as Premier of the Cayman Islands from 2021 to 2023, and is a member of the Parliament of the Cayman Islands for Bodden Town. Prior to his tenure in parliament he was chair of the law firm Walkers and president of the Caymanian Bar Association. He resigned as premier after surviving a motion of no confidence.

== Early life and education ==
G. Wayne Panton was born in the Cayman Islands, and grew up in Newlands, Cayman Islands. He graduated from Cayman Prep and High School and the Cayman Islands Law School.

== Career ==
Panton joined Walkers in 1988, became a partner in 1997, and later served as its chair. He was president of the Caymanian Bar Association and vice-chair of the National Trust for the Cayman Islands.

Panton was elected to the Legislative Assembly for Bodden Town. From 2013 to 2017, Panton served as Minister for Financial Services, Commerce and Environment and pushed for the passage of the National Conservation Act, the first of its kind for the Cayman Islands.

Panton was selected as Premier of the Cayman Islands on 21 April 2021, one week after the general election. A motion of no confidence against his government failed by a tied vote of 9 to 9 on 14 November 2023, but Panton resigned the next day. He declined to be nominated as Speaker. In 2025, he became a backbencher in order for the cabinet to have one female member.

== Personal life ==
Panton tested positive for COVID-19 in 2022. Panton provided a $1.64 million loan to Sabrina Turner in order for her to buy a house in Patrick's Island in 2023.

== Works cited ==
=== News ===
- "Attorney Wayne Panton Sworn in as Premier in Cayman Islands". The St. Kitts-Nevis Observer. 23 April 2021. Archived from the original on 25 April 2021.
- "Panton takes a back seat to ensure female minister". Cayman News Serive. 12 May 2025. Archived from the original on 2 July 2025.
- Connolly, Norma (15 November 2023). "Panton bids farewell as premier". Cayman Compass. Archived from the original on 2 July 2025.
- Ragoonath, Reshma (4 September 2024). "Panton loaned his health minister $1.64M to buy canal-front home while premier". Cayman Compass. Archived from the original on 2 July 2025.
- Ragoonath, Reshma (21 November 2023). "Wayne Panton declines Speaker's post". Cayman Compass. Archived from the original on 2 July 2025.
- Whittaker, James (5 July 2022). "Premier Wayne Panton tests positive for COVID-19". Cayman Compass. Archived from the original on 2 July 2025.

=== Web ===
- "Hon. G. Wayne Panton, JP, MP". Government of the Cayman Islands. Archived from the original on 2 July 2025.
- "Hon. G. Wayne Panton, JP, MP". Parliament of the Cayman Islands. Archived from the original on 2 July 2025.

Political offices
| Preceded by Alden McLaughlin | Premier of the Cayman Islands; 2021–2023 | Succeeded by Julianna O'Connor-Connolly |
