= Cayman Islands People's Party =

- Leader: Ezzard Miller
- Chairman: Donovan Ebanks
- Secretary: Gilbert Connolly
- Founder: Ezzard Miller
- Registered: November 2020
- Headquarters: 2, 1 Cayman House, North Church Street, George Town
- Ideology: Liberalism
- Political position: Centre
- Colours: Yellow; Blue
- Parliament of the Cayman Islands: 0 / 19

Website
- www.peoplesparty.ky

The Cayman Islands People's Party is a centrist political party in the Cayman Islands currently led by Ezzard Miller.

== History ==
The CIPP was registered with the Cayman Elections Office in November 2020. The CIPP is only the third formal political party in the Cayman Islands and the only one to have achieved non-profit status. The party was founded on the principles of "economic growth, care for the environment, and social well being".

The Cayman Islands People's Party contested in a general election for the first time in 2021 and did not win any seats.

== List of Leaders of the Cayman Islands People's Party ==
- Ezzard Miller (2020 – Present)

== Electoral Performance ==
Election	Leader	No. of votes	Share of votes	Seats	Result
2021	Ezzard Miller	217	1.26%	0 / 19	Extra-parliamentary
