= Premier of the Cayman Islands =

Government position

- Arms of His Majesty's; Cayman Islands Government

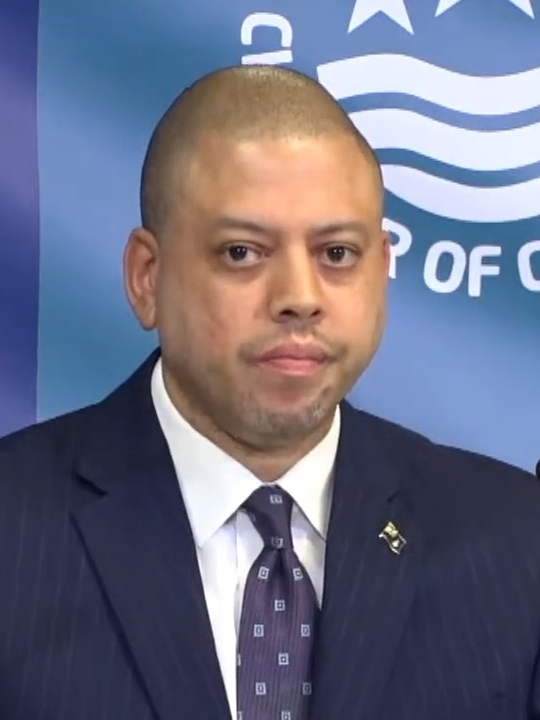
- Incumbent; André Ebanks since 6 May 2025
- Style: The Honourable
- Appointer: Governor of the Cayman Islands
- Term length: At the governor's pleasure
- Formation: 8 November 1992
- First holder: Thomas Jefferson as Leader of Government Business; McKeeva Bush as first official Premier
- Website: Office of the Premier

The Premier of the Cayman Islands is the political leader and head of government. The post of premier in the Cayman Islands is the equivalent to chief minister or prime minister in other British Overseas Territories. It is the highest political level that can be attained within the British overseas territory. Prior to 2009, the position was known as Leader of Government Business.

The premier and Cabinet (consisting of all the most senior ministers) are collectively accountable for their policies and actions to King Charles III, to the Parliament of the Cayman Islands, to their political party and ultimately to the electorate.

The premier earns a salary at Grade A5, the highest, in the Cayman Islands Civil Service Salary Scale, which was CI$239,604 per year (approx. US$287,641) as at 1 September 2022. The premier also receives an executive allowance of CI$5,000 per month, in addition to the constituency allowance of CI$5,000 paid to every MP. Total compensation for the position is therefore CI$359,604 (approx. US$431,700).

The current premier is André Ebanks, since 6 May 2025.

== Constitutional background ==
Until 2003 the position had no official recognition, but it was formalized by a constitutional amendment in June 2003, as the Leader of Government Business along with the Leader of the Opposition. Further constitutional amendments in 2009 modified the name to Premier.

== List ==
(Dates in italics indicate de facto continuation of office)

Independent CDP PPM TCCP
No.	Portrait	Name (Birth–Death)	Term of office			Political party	Elected	Notes
No.	Portrait	Name (Birth–Death)	Took office	Left office	Time in office	Political party	Elected	Notes
Leaders of Government Business (non-statutory) (1992–2003)
1		Thomas Jefferson (1940–2006)	25 November 1992	26 April 1995	2 years, 152 days	Independent	1992	
2		Truman Bodden (born 1945)	26 April 1995	15 November 2000	5 years, 203 days	Independent	1996	
3		Kurt Tibbetts (born 1954)	15 November 2000	8 November 2001	358 days	Independent	2000	First tenure
4		McKeeva Bush (born 1955)	9 November 2001	30 June 2003	1 year, 234 days	Cayman Democratic Party	—	First tenure
Leaders of Government Business (statutory) (2003–2009)
1		McKeeva Bush (born 1955)	30 June 2003	18 May 2005	1 year, 322 days	Cayman Democratic Party	—	
(2)		Kurt Tibbetts (born 1954)	18 May 2005	27 May 2009	4 years, 9 days	People's Progressive Movement	2005	Second tenure
(1)		McKeeva Bush (born 1955)	27 May 2009	5 November 2009	162 days	Cayman Democratic Party	2009	Second tenure
Premiers (2009–present)
1		McKeeva Bush (born 1955)	6 November 2009	19 December 2012	3 years, 43 days	Cayman Democratic Party	—	
2		Julianna O'Connor-Connolly (born 1961)	19 December 2012	29 May 2013	161 days	Independent	—	First tenure
3		Alden McLaughlin (born 1961)	29 May 2013	21 April 2021	7 years, 327 days	People's Progressive Movement	2013; 2017	
4		Wayne Panton (born 1964)	21 April 2021	15 November 2023	2 years, 208 days	Independent	2021	
(2)		Julianna O'Connor-Connolly (born 1961)	15 November 2023	6 May 2025	1 year, 172 days	Independent	—	Second tenure
5		André Ebanks	6 May 2025	Incumbent	1 year, 157 days	Caymanian Community Party	2025	

== See also ==
- List of current heads of government in the United Kingdom and dependencies
- Politics of the Cayman Islands
- Governor of the Cayman Islands
