= Alden McLaughlin =

Caymanian politician

The Honourable Sir Alden McLaughlin KCMG MBE KC JP MP
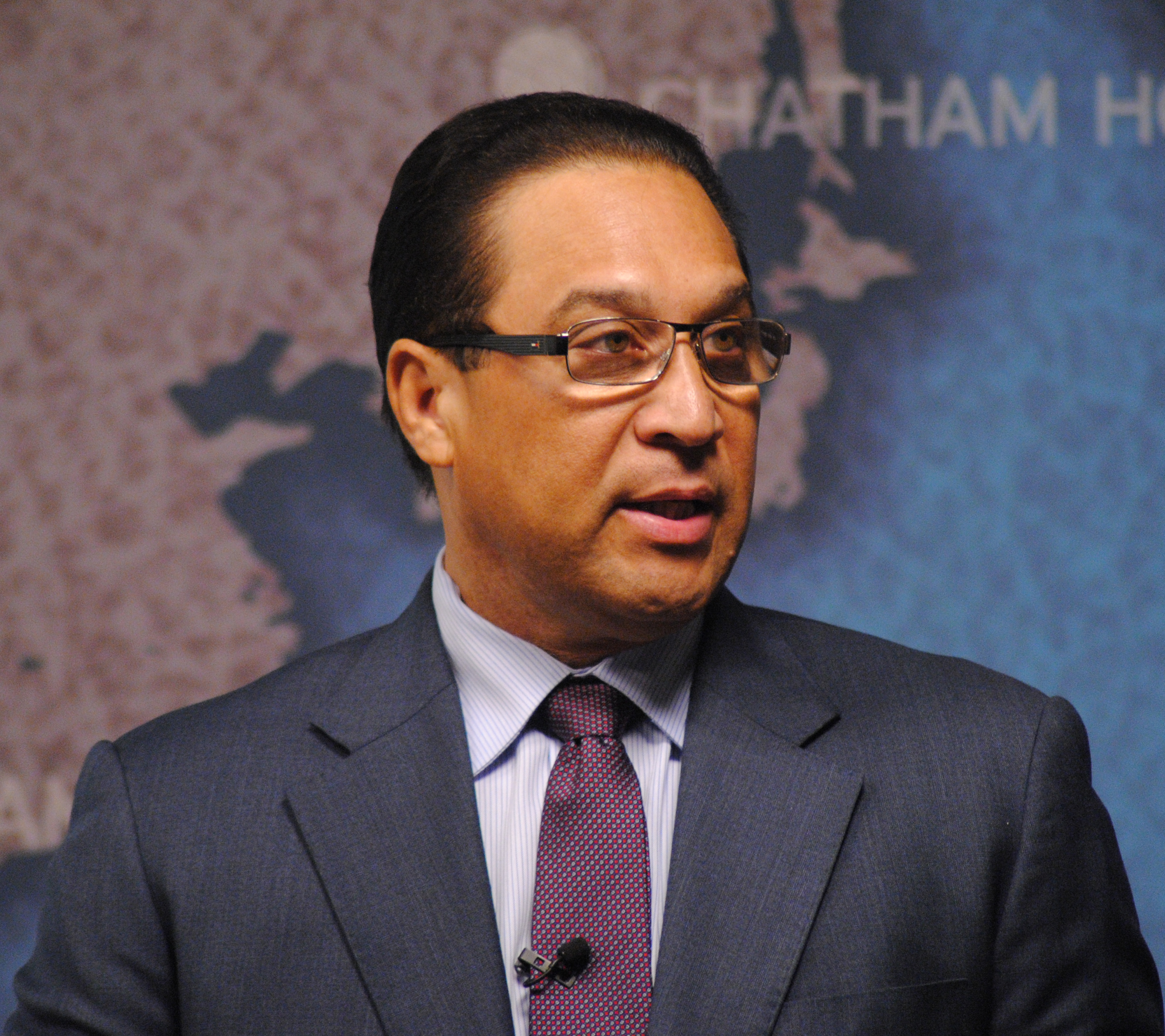

Speaker of the Parliament of the Cayman Islands
- In office 23 November 2023 – 1 March 2025
- Monarch: Charles III
- Governor: Jane Owen
- Preceded by: Katherine Ebanks-Wilks
- Succeeded by: Ezzard Miller

Premier of the Cayman Islands
- In office 29 May 2013 – 21 April 2021
- Monarch: Elizabeth II
- Governor: Helen Kilpatrick; Anwar Choudhury; Martyn Roper
- Preceded by: Julianna O'Connor-Connolly
- Succeeded by: Wayne Panton

Leader of the Opposition
- In office 21 February 2011 – 29 May 2013
- Monarch: Elizabeth II
- Governor: Duncan Taylor
- Preceded by: Kurt Tibbetts
- Succeeded by: McKeeva Bush

Leader of the People's Progressive Movement
- In office 12 February 2011 – 12 March 2021
- Preceded by: Kurt Tibbetts
- Succeeded by: Roy McTaggart

Member of the Parliament of the Cayman Islands
- In office November 2000 – 1 March 2025
- Constituency: Red Bay

Personal details
- Born: 6 September 1961 (age 65) George Town, Cayman Islands
- Party: People's Progressive Movement
- Spouse: Kim McLaughlin

Sir Alden McNee McLaughlin Jr., KCMG MBE KC JP MP (born 6 September 1961) is a Caymanian politician, former Premier of the Cayman Islands and former Speaker of Parliament of the Cayman Islands. McLaughlin previously served as leader of the People's Progressive Movement party from February 2011 to March 2021. McLaughlin was the elected member for the Red Bay Constituency in George Town between 2000 and 2025. McLaughlin decided not to seek re-election in the 2025 General Election.

== Early life and education ==
McLaughlin was born and raised in George Town, Cayman Islands, where he received his early education. He joined the Civil Service in July 1981 as Assistant Labour Officer. He transferred to the Judicial Department, where he was appointed Deputy Clerk of the Court in 1982.

McLaughlin graduated from the University of Liverpool in 1988 with a Bachelor of Laws degree and received a practice certificate from the Cayman Islands Law School. He was called to the bar the same year and joined the firm of Charles Adams & Company as an associate. He became a partner in 1993. He also served as a member of the Legal Advisory Council and the Grand Court Rules Committee and as president of the Caymanian Bar Association. McLaughlin left partnership in the firm in March 2006, committing himself fully to his political responsibilities.

== Political career ==
McLaughlin was first elected to the Legislative Assembly in 2000 and is a founding member of the People's Progressive Movement (The Progressives). The Progressives formed in 2002 and McLaughlin served as the party's General Secretary from 2002 to 2006. In 2005 general elections the Progressives won the majority of seats in Parliament and formed the Government. During May 2005 – May 2009 under the People's Progressive Movement administration, McLaughlin served as Minister for Education, Training, Employment, Youth, Sports and Culture and Second Elected Member for the district of George Town in the Legislative Assembly. As Minister of Education he led the transformation of education in Cayman, laying down the foundation for world class 21st century learning. This included a reform of the administration of education, the first ever national curriculum, a different approach to teaching and learning and special attention to early childhood education and special education needs. He was responsible for the creation of the new Education Modernisation Law and piloted its passage through the Legislative Assembly in early 2009. This new law raised the mandatory age for school attendance from 16 to 17 and set in place the framework for what is now being called the Year 12 programme in the government high-school system. He has also spearheaded the construction of 21st century learning environments with the new Clifton Hunter and John Gray campuses, an initiative for which he has and continues to receive both praise and condemnation.

McLaughlin has represented the Cayman Islands Government at the highest level internationally at forums and conferences and as a member of delegations to London, Washington, D.C., Brussels, Melbourne, Australia, Cape Town, South Africa and a range of other jurisdictions.

He is a proponent of good governance and of the need for open, honest and accountable government. He has been an advocate for more democratic government, freedom of information legislation and for a Bill of Rights for the Cayman Islands.

From as early as 2001, McLaughlin was at the forefront of the constitutional modernisation process for Cayman and during his term as Minister, he led the national discussions regarding constitutional change as well as the negotiations with the UK Government. The result was a new constitution which was approved in the country's first referendum held to coincide with the elections in May 2009.

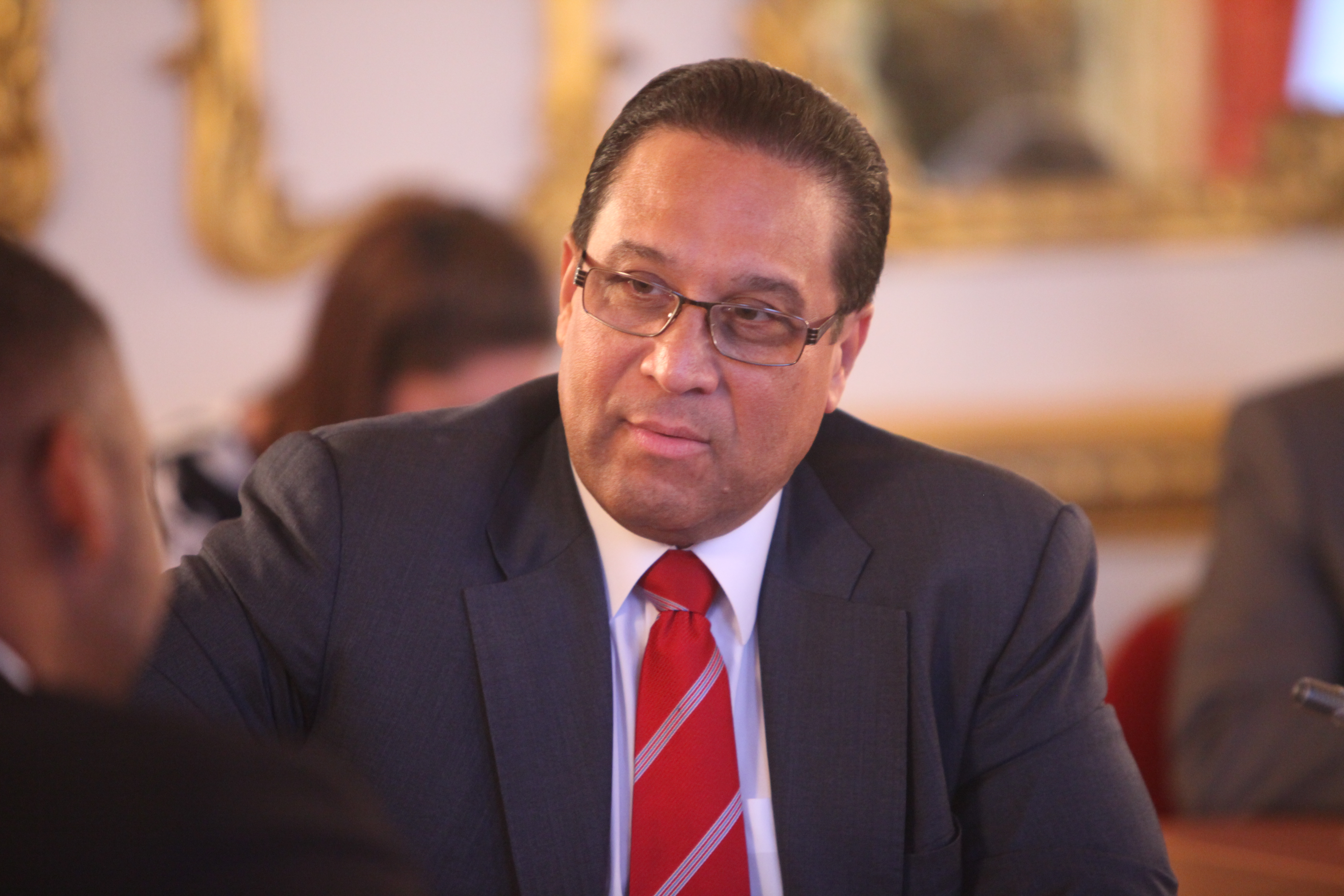
McLaughlin pictured at the Overseas Territories Joint Ministerial Council meeting in London on December 1, 2015.

On 12 February 2011, The People's Progressive Movement made history when it became the first political party in the Cayman Islands to transfer leadership. Kurt Tibbetts the then current leader of the opposition and founder of the PPM, stepped down as Leader of the Opposition and Leader of the People's Progressive Movement at the extraordinary party conference, passing on the party's top job to Alden McLaughlin. McLaughlin was sworn in as Leader of the Opposition on 21 February 2011 in the Legislative Assembly of the Cayman Islands.

McLaughlin led the Progressives to win half of the seats in the 2013 general election. Following the election, outgoing premier Juliana O'Connor-Connolly crossed the floor to join the Progressives giving them a majority and paving the way to McLaughlin becoming premier. McLaughlin also secured the support of all 3 independent members belonging to the Coalition for Cayman parliamentary group, giving him a 13–5 majority. McLaughlin served as Premier and Minister of Home Affairs and Health in the People's Progressive Movement Administration 2013–2017 Administration.

Following the 2017 general election a coalition government between the Progressives, Cayman Democratic Party members and independent members was agreed upon, and McLaughlin once again took office, serving his second term as Premier on 31 May 2017 also serving as Minister of Employment, Border Control, Community Affairs, International Trade, Investment, Aviation and Maritime Affairs.

McLaughlin was appointed Member of the Order of the British Empire (MBE) in the 2010 Birthday Honours for services to constitutional reform, and Knight Commander of the Order of St Michael and St George (KCMG) in the 2022 New Year Honours for services to the people of the Cayman Islands.

On the 23 November 2023, McLaughlin was elected unanimously by the Parliament of the Cayman Islands as the Speaker of the House, after former Premier Wayne Panton declined the role.

== Personal life ==
McLaughlin is an attorney-at-law with 34 years call and is a King's Counsel.

McLaughlin has been a Lion for more than 32 years and is a past president of the Lions Club of Grand Cayman.

An avid cyclist, McLaughlin makes time on his bike and in the gym a regular part of his daily routine. He loves reading, confessing to keeping two or three books going at the same time. He enjoys farming and since demitting office as Premier is now able to spend time developing his farm in East End, known as Company Place Grounds.

McLaughlin also serves as a Justice of the Peace.

McLaughlin is married to Kim and they have two adult sons.

Political offices
Preceded by Julianna O'Connor-Connolly	Premier of the Cayman Islands; 2013–2021	Succeeded by Wayne Panton
