= Ezzard Miller =

Caymanian politician and parliamentary speaker

The Honourable Ezzard Miller JP

Speaker of the Parliament of the Cayman Islands
- Incumbent
- Assumed office 6 May 2025
- Preceded by: Alden McLaughlin

Leader of the Opposition
- In office 31 May 2017 – 2 May 2019

Elected member for North Side
- In office 2009–2021

Elected member for North Side
- In office 1984–1992

Personal details
- Born: Dennison Ezzard Miller; July 14, 1952 (age 73) Cayman Islands
- Spouse: Maicel Amparo Miller
- Children: 2
- Profession: Pharmacist, human resources manager, politician

Dennison Ezzard Miller (born 14 July 1952) is a Caymanian politician who has served as Speaker of the Parliament of the Cayman Islands since 6 May 2025. He previously represented North Side in the Legislative Assembly from 1984 to 1992 and again from 2009 to 2021, served as Minister of Health and Social Services from 1988 to 1992, chaired the Public Accounts Committee from 2009 to 2021, and was Leader of the Opposition from 2017 to 2019.

== Early life and career ==
Miller was born in the Cayman Islands on 14 July 1952. Before entering politics, he worked for six years as a pharmacist at the Cayman Islands Hospital, then owned and managed a pharmacy until 1988. He later worked as a human resources manager for Deloitte Cayman and opened a health care consultancy firm in July 2007.

== Political career ==
Miller was first elected as the member for North Side in 1984. During his second term, from 1988 to 1992, he served as Minister of Health and Social Services. After a period in the private sector, he returned to the Legislative Assembly in 2009 as the independent representative for North Side.

In 2017, Miller was appointed Leader of the Opposition after the general election. He resigned from that role in May 2019 after support among opposition independents broke down. Later that year, he announced the formation of the Cayman Islands People's Party, which was formally launched in 2020 ahead of the 2021 general election.

From 2009 to 2021, Miller chaired the Public Accounts Committee, overseeing parliamentary scrutiny of public expenditure and government accountability.

On 6 May 2025, Miller was sworn in as Speaker of the Parliament of the Cayman Islands.
