= Cayman Democratic Party =

- Leader: McKeeva Bush
- Chairman: Tessa Johnson Bodden
- Founder: McKeeva Bush
- Founded: November 2001
- Dissolved: February 2021
- Ideology: Fiscal conservatism Classical liberalism Neoliberalism
- Political position: Centre to centre-right
- Religion: Christianity
- Colours: Green; Blue

The Cayman Democratic Party, formerly known as the United Democratic Party, was a political party in the Cayman Islands formed in late 2001 and collapsed in February 2021.

== History ==
In the elections of 8 November 2000, with a turnout of 80%, only non-partisans were elected. After the election members of parliament formed the United Democratic Party, currently headed by McKeeva Bush.

The Cayman Democratic Party served as the opposition party in the Legislative Assembly of the Cayman Islands from 2013 to 2017. The party also previously served as opposition from May 2005-May 2009.

After the 2017 election, a coalition government between the Progressives, Democratic Party, and independents was announced where Alden McLaughlin of the Progressives would have remained as premier and Democratic leader Bush would have become speaker. However, a coalition agreement was later reached between the Democratic Party and all independent members apart from one to form a Bush-led “government of national unity;” this Democratic Party-Independent deal later fell through and the initial Progressive-Democratic-Independent deal was re-agreed to.

=== Collapse ===
Before the 2021 election, in December 2020, Democratic leader McKeeva Bush received a two-month suspended jail sentence for assaulting a woman in February 2020 leading to a no-confidence motion against him. Premier McLaughlin asked Governor Martyn Roper to dissolve Parliament on 14 February, triggering early elections instead of having the vote on the motion. In the lead-up to the election, the Democratic Party was described as "[appearing] to be defunct" as figures previously of the party (including Bush) instead contested as independents.

== List of Cayman Democratic Party leaders ==
- McKeeva Bush: (November 2001 – February 2021)

== Electoral performance ==
Year	Leader	No. of votes	Share of votes	Seats
2005	McKeeva Bush	6,062	30.86%	5 / 15
2009	McKeeva Bush	17,299	44.2%	9 / 15
2013	McKeeva Bush	16,816	27.8%	3 / 18
2017	McKeeva Bush	3,786	24.08%	3 / 19

== See also ==
- Category:Cayman Democratic Party politicians
