= Katherine Ebanks-Wilks =

Caymanian politician

Katherine Ebanks-Wilks is a Caymanian politician who is serving as Speaker of Parliament of the Cayman Islands and Parliamentary Secretary to Ministry of Financial Services & Commerce and Ministry of Education.

She is a former Sustainability and Climate Resiliency Minister.
