= Anwar Choudhury =

British diplomat of Bangladeshi origin (born 1959)

- আনোয়ার চৌধুরী
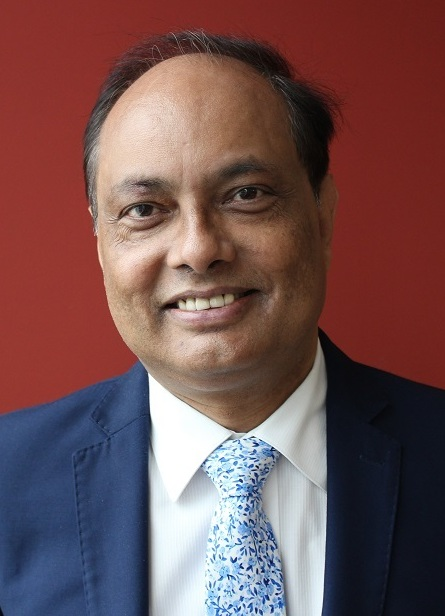
- Official Portrait, 2017

Governor of the Cayman Islands
- In office 26 March 2018 – 20 September 2018
- Monarch: Elizabeth II
- Preceded by: Helen Kilpatrick
- Succeeded by: Martyn Roper

British Ambassador to Peru
- In office 2014–2018
- Monarch: Elizabeth II
- Prime Minister: David Cameron; Theresa May
- Preceded by: James Dauris
- Succeeded by: Kate Harrisson

British High Commissioner to Bangladesh
- In office 2004–2008
- Monarch: Elizabeth II
- Prime Minister: Tony Blair; Gordon Brown
- Preceded by: David Carter
- Succeeded by: Stephen Evans

Personal details
- Born: Anwar Bakht Choudhury; 15 June 1959 (age 67) Jagannathpur, Sylhet District, East Pakistan (now Bangladesh)
- Spouse: Momina Choudhury
- Children: 4
- Education: Durham University
- Profession: Diplomat

Anwar Bakht Choudhury (Bengali: আনোয়ার বখত চৌধুরী; born 15 June 1959) is a British diplomat of Bangladeshi origin. Through his career, he has served as Governor of the Cayman Islands, British Ambassador to Peru, Director of International Institutions at the Foreign & Commonwealth Office and British High Commissioner to Bangladesh. Choudhury has spent much of his life working intimately with the British Bangladeshi community, cementing himself as a respected figure through his many public appearances and charitable work.

== Early life ==
Choudhury was born on 15 June 1959, to a Bengali Muslim family in East Pakistan (now Bangladesh). His family is originally from the village of Prabhakarpur, Patli Union, Jagannathpur, Sunamganj, and moved to the United Kingdom when he was young.

== Education ==
Choudhury followed an unusual route into the Diplomatic Service; in 1985, he attained a BSc in Electrical and Electronic Engineering from the University of Salford. He worked at Siemens Plessey, before entering the Civil Service as an engineering strategist with the Royal Air Force. In 1995, he graduated with a Master of Business Administration from Durham University.

== Career ==
Choudhury was promoted through the Ministry of Defence until 2000, when he was recruited by the Cabinet Office, before being headhunted for the position of High Commissioner to Bangladesh. He was succeeded in 2008 by Stephen Evans. When he was appointed as High Commissioner to Bangladesh in 2004, he became one of the first two British ambassadors from ethnic minority backgrounds to be appointed in modern times (the other being Alp Mehmet, who was appointed Ambassador to Iceland). He was sworn in as Governor of the Cayman Islands on 26 March 2018.

=== Grenade attack ===
On 21 May 2004, Choudhury was targeted in a failed grenade attack, in which he was wounded and two bystanders were killed. The attempted assassination came as he was leaving the Dargah-e-Shah Jalal mosque in Sylhet Division, his home province, following Jumu'ah (Friday prayers). In December 2008, three attackers were sentenced to death and two others to life in prison for the attack.

=== Recall to London ===
Choudhury was recalled to London in June 2018 after unsubstantiated allegations of misconduct. On 20 September 2018 it was announced that he would not be returning to the Cayman Islands despite no criminal actions being found to have been committed Choudhury, widespread popularity, and petitions to reinstate him being circulated by local government officials.

Diplomatic posts
Preceded by David Carter	British High Commissioner to Bangladesh; 2004–2008	Succeeded by Stephen Evans
Preceded by James Dauris	British Ambassador to Peru; 2014–2018	Succeeded by Kate Harrisson
Government offices
Preceded by Helen Kilpatrick	Governor of the Cayman Islands; March 2018– September 2018	Succeeded by Martyn Roper

== Personal life ==
Choudhury is a Muslim. His main interests include folk music of Bengal (baul). He is also passionate about community integration and protection of the UK abroad. He is married to Momina Choudhury and has three daughters. He also has a son from his first marriage. He has three brothers. His hobbies include playing cricket and bridge. He has interest in Bangladeshi cuisine too.

Choudhury has dismissed suggestions of a conflict of loyalty, stating that he would support the English cricket team against the one in Bangladesh.

== See also ==
- British Bangladeshi
- List of British Bangladeshis
- List of high commissioners of the United Kingdom to Bangladesh
- List of diplomats of the United Kingdom to Peru
