= 2017 Caymanian general election =

- 24 May 2017
- 19 of the 21 seats in the Legislative Assembly; 10 seats needed for a majority
| Party | Leader | Vote % | Seats | +/– |
|---|---|---|---|---|
| PPM | Alden McLaughlin | 31.23 | 7 | −2 |
| CDP | McKeeva Bush | 24.08 | 3 | 0 |
| Independents | – | 44.69 | 9 | +7 |
This lists parties that won seats. See the complete results below.
Results by constituency
| Premier before | Premier after |
|---|---|
| Alden McLaughlin; PPM | Alden McLaughlin; PPM |

General elections were held in the Cayman Islands on 24 May 2017. They were the first elections held under the electoral reforms approved in a 2012 referendum, which introduced single-member constituencies.

The People's Progressive Movement remained the largest party, winning seven of the 19 seats. However, independents emerged as the largest group in the Legislative Assembly with nine seats.

== Results ==
| Party | Votes | % | Seats | +/– |
|---|---|---|---|---|
| People's Progressive Movement | 4,909 | 31.23 | 7 | –2 |
| Cayman Democratic Party | 3,786 | 24.08 | 3 | 0 |
| Independents | 7,026 | 44.69 | 9 | +7 |
| Total | 15,721 | 100.00 | 19 | +1 |
| Registered voters/turnout | 21,228 | – | | |
Source: Elections Office

=== By constituency ===
| Constituency | Candidate | Party | Votes |
|---|---|---|---|
| Bodden Town East | Dwayne Stanley Seymour | Independent | 427 |
| Bodden Town East | Robert Anthony Bodden | Cayman Democratic Party | 367 |
| Bodden Town East | Osbourne Vendryes Bodden | People's Progressive Movement | 290 |
| Bodden Town East | Arnold Thomas Berry | Independent | 41 |
| Bodden Town West | Christopher Selvin Saunders | Independent | 380 |
| Bodden Town West | Maxine Bodden-Robinson | People's Progressive Movement | 306 |
| Bodden Town West | Stafford Berry | Cayman Democratic Party | 217 |
| Bodden Town West | Gilbert Allan McLean | Independent | 187 |
| Cayman Brac East | Juliana O'connor-Connolly | People's Progressive Movement | 225 |
| Cayman Brac East | Rudolph Lenbergh Dixon | Independent | 183 |
| Cayman Brac West & Little Cayman | Moses Kirkconnell, III | People's Progressive Movement | 302 |
| Cayman Brac West & Little Cayman | Maxine Avon Moore | Independent | 95 |
| East End | V. Arden McLean | Independent | 272 |
| East End | Issac Rankine | Independent | 246 |
| East End | John B. McLean, Jr. | Independent | 74 |
| George Town Central | Kenneth Vernon Bryan | Independent | 495 |
| George Town Central | Marco Archer | People's Progressive Movement | 460 |
| George Town East | Roy Michael McTaggart | People's Progressive Movement | 410 |
| George Town East | Theresa Elizabeth Bodden | Cayman Democratic Party | 193 |
| George Town East | Sharon Elaine Roulstone | Independent | 192 |
| George Town East | Kenrick Herbert Webster, Dr. | Independent | 106 |
| George Town North | Joseph Hew | People's Progressive Movement | 402 |
| George Town North | Pearlina McGaw-Lumsden | Cayman Democratic Party | 268 |
| George Town North | Karin M. Thompson | Independent | 117 |
| George Town South | Barbara Conolly | People's Progressive Movement | 375 |
| George Town South | Michael Thomas Adam | Cayman Democratic Party | 307 |
| George Town South | Alric Jeremy Lindsay | Independent | 90 |
| George Town South | Catherine Rosita Tyson | Independent | 78 |
| George Town South | Paul Wendell Hurlston | Independent | 72 |
| George Town West | David Charles Wight | People's Progressive Movement | 350 |
| George Town West | Jonathan Bardowell Piercy | Cayman Democratic Party | 334 |
| George Town West | Ellio Anthony Solomon | Independent | 93 |
| George Town West | Dennie Warren, Jr. | Independent | 80 |
| Newlands | Alva Horatio Suckoo, Jr. | Independent | 433 |
| Newlands | Gurney Wayne Panton | People's Progressive Movement | 418 |
| Newlands | Raul Gonzalez, Jr. | Independent | 156 |
| North Side | Ezzard Miller | Independent | 201 |
| North Side | Johany Ebanks | Independent | 179 |
| North Side | Edward Owen Chisholm | People's Progressive Movement | 139 |
| North Side | Justin Ebanks | Independent | 75 |
| Prospect | Austin Harris, Jr. | Independent | 466 |
| Prospect | Lucille Seymour | People's Progressive Movement | 329 |
| Prospect | Matthew Leslie | Independent | 58 |
| Red Bay | Alden McLaughlin | People's Progressive Movement | 478 |
| Red Bay | Denniston Leitch Tibbetts | Cayman Democratic Party | 274 |
| Red Bay | Frank McField | Independent | 92 |
| Savannah | Anthony Eden | Independent | 446 |
| Savannah | Heather Bodden | People's Progressive Movement | 357 |
| Savannah | Kent McTaggart | Independent | 164 |
| West Bay Central | Eugene Ebanks, Capt. | Cayman Democratic Party | 435 |
| West Bay Central | Katherine Ebanks-Wilks | Independent | 342 |
| West Bay North | Bernie Bush | Cayman Democratic Party | 436 |
| West Bay North | Mervin Smith | Independent | 269 |
| West Bay North | Sarah Orrett-ebanks | Independent | 99 |
| West Bay South | Tara Rivers | Independent | 534 |
| West Bay South | John Jefferson, Jr. | Cayman Democratic Party | 350 |
| West Bay South | Burns Rankin | Independent | 56 |
| West Bay South | Laura Young | Independent | 52 |
| West Bay West | McKeeva Bush | Cayman Democratic Party | 605 |
| West Bay West | Paul Desmond Rivers | Independent | 176 |
| West Bay West | Daphne Louise Orrett | People's Progressive Movement | 68 |

== Government formation ==
Initially, a coalition government between the Progressives, Cayman Democratic Party members and independents was announced. Under the arrangement, Alden McLaughlin would have remained as premier and McKeeva Bush would have become speaker. However, an agreement was later reached between the Cayman Democratic Party and all independent members apart from one to form a “government of national unity” in which McKeeva Bush will take office as Premier. In response, Alden McLaughlin suggested the incoming government would be a "train wreck" and that he did not "expect this government to last very long".

It was then revealed that the deal between the CDP and independent members had failed, and that discussions on government formation were ongoing by all parties.

Eventually, the coalition government originally proposed between the Progressives, Cayman Democratic Party members and independent members was agreed upon, and took office with Alden McLaughlin as Premier on 31 May.
