= People's Progressive Movement (Cayman Islands) =

Caymanian Political party

- Abbreviation: PPM
- Leader: Joey Hew
- Chairman: Alden McLaughlin
- Founder: Kurt Tibbetts
- Founded: September 2002; 23 years ago
- Headquarters: Crewe Road, George Town
- Ideology: Economic liberalism
- Colours: Red; Blue
- Parliament of the Cayman Islands: 7 / 19

Website
- theprogressives.ky

The People's Progressive Movement is a major political party in the Cayman Islands currently headed by Joey Hew. As of 2025, it is the longest operating political party in the Cayman Islands, having a presence in national politics since 2002. Since the party’s founding, they have maintained a political stronghold in the capital city George Town, with the party currently filling every seat in all but one of George Town’s electoral districts ahead of the 2025 General Election.

== History ==
The People's Progressive Movement was founded in 2002. The founding members of the Party, which included Parliamentarians Kurt Tibbetts, Alden McLaughlin, Anthony Eden and Arden McLean, together with Lucille Seymour and many other "Movers and Shakers", committed to the ideals of principle-led governance, full participatory democracy, the formulation of a national development plan and a long-term vision of where they wanted to take the country.

Through the Party's internal processes, the members chose the candidates to represent the Party and ultimately the people of the Cayman Islands. The Party got to work and by the next general election in 2005 was able to present a slate of nine candidates all of whom were embraced by the electorate. The first election contested by the party was the 2005 Caymanian general election, which were by the PPM, who took 9 of the 15 seats in the Legislative Assembly. The first PPM Government took office in May 2005, having been joined by independent candidate for Cayman Brac and Little Cayman, Moses Kirkconnell.

At the subsequent 2009 Caymanian general election the party was defeated by the opposition United Democratic Party and stood in opposition from 2009 – 2013. A referendum on a draft constitution was held at the same time.

On 12 February 2011, the People's Progressive Movement became the first political party in the Cayman Islands to transfer leadership. Kurt Tibbetts, the Leader of the Opposition and founder of the PPM, stepped down at the extraordinary conference, passing on the party's top job to Alden McLaughlin.

A cohesive group of candidates representing a broad and complementary set of skills and experience united under the Party's new leader, Leader of the Opposition, Alden McLaughlin in 2011. The Party presented plans for creating jobs, building communities and restoring pride in government and the country. Immediately following the polls, Juliana O'Connor-Connolly joined nine successful Progressives candidates to cement victory for the Party in the 2013 Caymanian general election.

The general election was held on 24 May 2017. This was the first election to be held after electoral reforms were approved in a 2012 referendum which introduced single member constituencies. The Progressives remained the largest party, winning seven of the nineteen seats. However independents emerged as the largest group in the Legislative Assembly with nine seats. Following negotiations, a coalition government between the Progressives, three Cayman Democratic Party members and two independent members was agreed upon and took office with Alden McLaughlin as Premier of the Cayman Islands on 31 May 2017 securing a second term in office.

Before the 2021 election, PPM leader Alden McLaughlin stepped down as he was term-limited from serving another term as Premier with then-Minister of Public Finance and Economic Development Roy McTaggart becoming leader and McLaughlin taking the role of chairman. On election night, there were jubilant scenes at the Progressive watch party as the party maintained its seven seats along with a Progressive-aligned independent winning. Both McTaggart and McLaughlin were confident about pulling over the two independent MPs necessary to form a government; however, in the next week, Wayne Panton of the PACT group formed a majority with ten of the independents before adding PPM MP Juliana O'Connor-Connolly and another independent on the day he was swore in as Premier. McTaggart became Leader of the Opposition with a caucus of six Progressives and one independent.

== List of Leaders of the People's Progressive Movement ==
- Kurt Tibbetts (2002 – 2011)
- Alden McLaughlin (2011 – 2021)
- Roy McTaggart (2021 – 2025)
- Joey Hew (2025 – present)

== Election results ==
Election	Leader	Votes	%	Seats	Result
2005	Kurt Tibbetts	13,199	67.2%	10 / 15	Government
2009	Kurt Tibbetts	11,645	29.8%	5 / 15	Opposition
2013	Alden McLaughlin	21,859	36.1%	10 / 18	Government
2017	Alden McLaughlin	4,909	31.23%	7 / 19	Government
2021	Roy McTaggart	3,380	19.60%	7 / 19	Opposition
2025	Joey Hew	5,044	27.37%	7 / 19	Opposition
