= Helen Kilpatrick =

British civil servant

Helen Kilpatrick CB
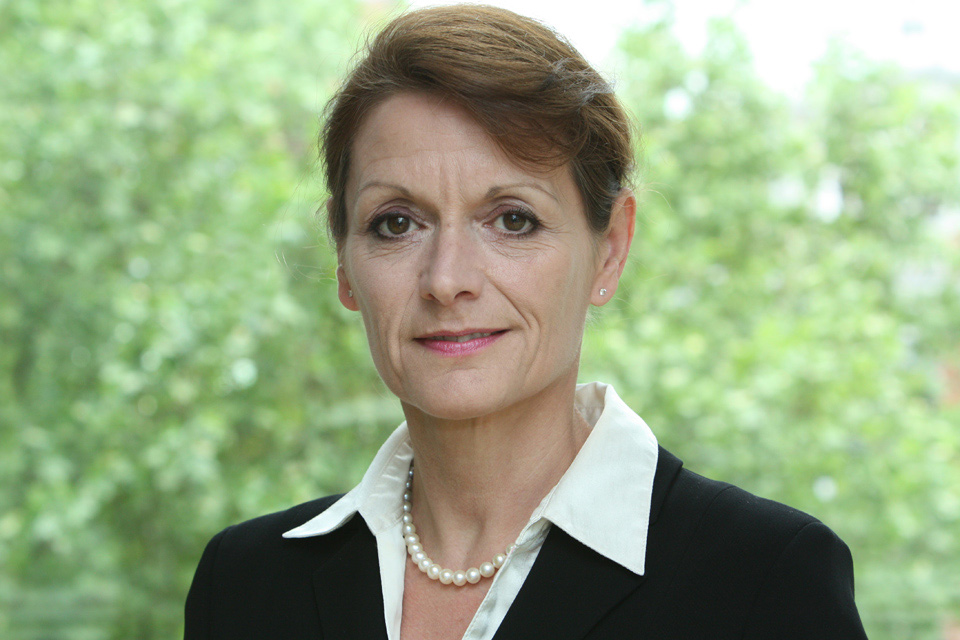

Governor of the Cayman Islands
- In office 6 September 2013 – 5 March 2018
- Monarch: Elizabeth II
- Preceded by: Duncan Taylor
- Succeeded by: Anwar Choudhury

Personal details
- Born: 9 October 1958 (age 67) Guernsey

Helen Marjorie Kilpatrick CB (née Ball) (born 9 October 1958) is a British civil servant. She was Governor of the Cayman Islands between 2013 and 2018.

== Career ==
Kilpatrick was educated at King's College, Cambridge. She began her career in local government in England, qualifying as a Public Finance Accountant. She was appointed Group Auditor at the Greater London Council in 1985, going through various local government positions, including Controller of Financial Services at Greenwich London Borough Council from 1989 to 1995. In 1995 she was appointed to be the County Treasurer of West Sussex County Council, a position she held for ten years. She was also Deputy Chief Executive.

In 2005 she was appointed by the Home Office to be Director General of Finance & Corporate Services. While in this post she was appointed Companion of the Order of the Bath (CB) in the 2010 New Year Honours. During 2012 and into 2013 she served as the acting Home Office Permanent Secretary.

In June 2013 she was announced as the next Governor of the Cayman Islands. Commenting on this, Mrs Kilpatrick said “I am honoured and delighted to be appointed Governor of the Cayman Islands. I look forward to working in a constructive partnership with the newly elected government to ensure a safe, successful and sustainable future for the Cayman Islands”. She left the post in March 2018.

== Offices ==
Government offices
Preceded by Duncan Taylor	Governor of the Cayman Islands; 2013–2018	Succeeded by Anwar Choudhury
