= Martyn Roper =

British diplomat and civil servant

Martyn Roper OBE
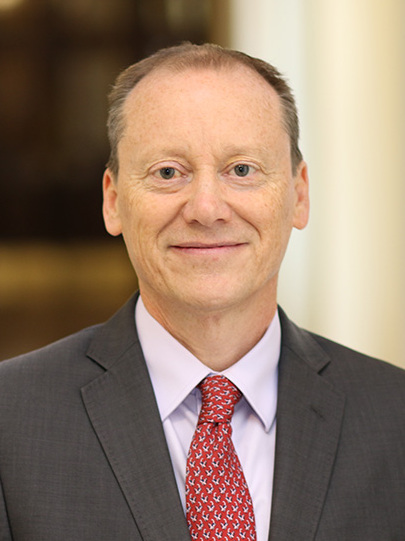

Governor of the Cayman Islands
- In office 29 October 2018 – 29 March 2023
- Monarchs: Elizabeth II; Charles III
- Preceded by: Anwar Choudhury
- Succeeded by: Jane Owen

British Ambassador to Algeria
- In office 2010–2014
- Monarch: Elizabeth II
- Prime Minister: David Cameron
- Preceded by: Andrew Henderson
- Succeeded by: Andrew Noble

Personal details
- Born: 8 June 1965 (age 60) Halifax, West Yorkshire, England

Martyn Keith Roper OBE (born 8 June 1965) is a British diplomat and civil servant who served as Governor of the Cayman Islands between 29 October 2018 and 29 March 2023. Roper was the second longest-serving governor of the Cayman Islands behind Thomas Russell who served a total of 7 years. He was succeeded by Jane Owen as Governor of the Cayman Islands.

Roper was the British Ambassador to Algeria from 2010 to 2014. He was appointed OBE in 2013 "for services to UK interests in Algeria, particularly the UK response to the In Amenas hostage crisis".

Diplomatic posts
| Preceded by Andrew Henderson | British Ambassador to Algeria; 2010–2014 | Succeeded by Andrew Noble |
Government offices
| Preceded by Anwar Choudhury | Governor of the Cayman Islands; 2018–2023 | Succeeded by Jane Owen |
