= Parliament of the Cayman Islands =

British Overseas Territory legislature

- Coat of arms of the Cayman Islands

Type
- Type: Unicameral

History
- Founded: 5 December 1831

Leadership
- Speaker: Ezzard Miller, Independent since 6 May 2025
- Premier: André Ebanks, Caymanian Community Party since 6 May 2025
- Leader of the Opposition: Joey Hew, People's Progressive Movement since 7 October 2024

Structure
- Seats: 19
- Political groups: Government (11): Caymanian Community Party (4); Cayman Islands National Party (4); Independent (3); Official Opposition (8): People's Progressive Movement (7); Independent (1)

Elections
- Voting system: First-past-the-post
- Last election: 30 April 2025
- Next election: 2029

Website
- parliament.ky

The Parliament of the Cayman Islands is the unicameral legislature of the British Overseas Territory of the Cayman Islands. It is composed of 21 members; 19 elected members for a four-year term and two members ex officio.

The Governor may at any time, by Proclamation, prorogue or dissolve the Parliament. The Governor shall dissolve the Parliament at the expiration of four years from the date when the Parliament first meets after any general election unless it has been sooner dissolved. There shall be a general election at such time within two months after every dissolution of the Parliament as the Governor shall, by Proclamation, appoint. The first meeting of every session of the House shall, by Proclamation, be held on such day as the Governor shall appoint. A session usually consists of four meetings. A Meeting comprises several sittings.

In the elections of 8 November 2000, with a turnout of 80% only non-partisans were elected. After the election, conservative members of parliament formed the United Democratic Party. The conservative social democratic People's Progressive Movement formed in response and won the subsequent election. The United Democratic Party has since collapsed, with former members either exiting politics or becoming independents.

On 31 October 2024 Deputy Premier André Ebanks, Ministers Ebanks-Wilks and Turner, and Parliamentary Secretary Heather Bodden resigned from the Government effective immediately. This move raises the prospect of an early general election and questions the ability for the current Government to pass legislation. Such legislation would require support from Elected Members from different parties. Furthermore, the governor would need to sign off on that arrangement.

== History ==
The first meeting to discuss the possible legislative future of the Cayman Islands took place on 5 December 1831 at Pedro St. James Castle, a great house in the fertile area of Savannah on Grand Cayman. This building is the seat of parliamentary beginnings in the Cayman Islands.

By 1909 what got established as the Legislative Assembly of Justices and Vestry was meeting in the Court House on the waterfront in what is now the headquarters of the Cayman Islands National Museum, in front of Hog Sty Bay and the cruise passenger arrival terminal. The building served as the seat of government, the court house and the legislature. Now it is the home of the Cayman Islands National Museum.

The present Parliament building was built on the site of the former Princess Royal Park. The building design was the subject of some controversy when selected as the winner of an international architectural competition. Being the first poured concrete public building in Cayman, modern techniques were not yet in use, so the concrete was mixed on the street and poured pail by pail by a bucket brigade. The cornerstone was laid by Captain Rayal Brazly Bodden, MBE, JP, on 29 September 1971. The building was completed in July 1972.

By 2003, the legislature had outgrown the space and the building was in need of renovating. Repair and refurbishment work on the building began in February 2003, which added more space through reconfiguration, and renovated and refurbished portions of the interior, including the main chamber.

The newly refurbished and expanded building was inaugurated with the opening of the Legislature session on 2 July 2004, two months before Hurricane Ivan, which almost completely devastated Grand Cayman over a two-day period (11–12 September 2004). The LA building withstood the storm with minor damage to its roof.

Nineteen members (Members of the Parliament, MPs) are currently elected on a "one person, one vote" basis, following a Constitution Order in 2015. This replaced the electoral system from the 2009 constitutional amendment (where 18 members were elected from five multi- and two single-member constituencies). The two ex officio (appointed) members, the Deputy Governor and the Attorney-General, are appointed by the Governor of the Cayman Islands.

On 3 December 2020, the Legislative Assembly of the Cayman Islands was renamed the Parliament of the Cayman Islands by the Cayman Islands Constitution (Amendment) Order 2020.

== Official Members ==
- Hon. Franz Manderson, MBE: Deputy Governor; First Official Member, Responsible for External Affairs
- Hon. Samuel Bulgin, JP, KC: Attorney General; Second Official Member, Responsible for Legal Affairs

== Elected members ==
Party key	Independent
Party key	People's Progressive Movement
Party key	Caymanian Community Party
Party key	Cayman Islands National Party

=== Speaker of the Parliament of the Cayman Islands ===
Member	Roles	District
Hon. Ezzard Miller	Speaker of the Parliament	—N/a

=== Cabinet Ministers ===
Member	Roles	District
Hon. André Ebanks	Premier of the Cayman Islands; Minister for Financial Services and Commerce	Elected Member for West Bay South
Hon. Gary Rutty	Deputy Premier and Minister for Tourism and Trade Development	Elected Member for George Town South
Hon. Katherine Ebanks-Wilks	Minister for Health, Environment and Sustainability	Elected Member for West Bay Central
Hon. Rolston Anglin	Minister for Finance and Economic Development and Minister for Education and Training	Elected Member for West Bay North
Hon. Johany Ebanks	Minister for Planning, Lands, Agriculture, Housing and Infrastructure	Elected Member for North Side
Hon. Isaac Rankine	Minister for Social Development and Innovation and Minister for Youth, Sports, Culture and Heritage	Elected Member for East End
Hon. Nickolas DaCosta	Minister for District Administration and Home Affairs	Elected Member for Cayman Brac West & Little Cayman
Hon. Michael Myles	Minister for Caymanian Employment and Immigration	Elected Member for Prospect

=== Backbenchers ===
Member	Roles	District
Hon. Julie Hunter	Parliamentary Secretary responsible for Planning, Lands, Agriculture, Housing and Infrastructure; Education and Training; Culture and Heritage	Elected Member for West Bay West
Hon. Heather Bodden	Parliamentary Secretary responsible for Social Development; Education and Training; Tourism	Elected Member for Savannah
Hon. Wayne Panton	Parliamentary Secretary responsible for Caymanian Employment and Immigration; Infrastructure; Health, Environment and Sustainability; Financial Services and Commerce	Elected Member for Newlands

=== Opposition ===
==== Official Opposition Members ====
Member	Roles	District
Hon. Joseph Hew	Leader of the Opposition	Elected Member for George Town North
Hon. Kenneth Bryan	Deputy Leader of the Opposition	Elected Member for George Town Central
Hon. Pearlina McGaw-Lumsden	Deputy Speaker	Elected Member for George Town West
Hon. Juliana O'Connor-Connolly		Elected Member for Cayman Brac East
Mr. Roy Tatum		Elected Member for Red Bay
Mr. Roy McTaggart		Elected Member for George Town East
Mr. Dwayne Seymour		Elected Member for Bodden Town East
Mr. Christopher Saunders		Elected Member for Bodden Town West

== Results ==
- 2021 Cayman Islands general election

== See also ==
- List of speakers of the Legislative Assembly of the Cayman Islands
