= History by country =

This is a list of articles covering the history of present-day nations, states, and dependencies. Countries are listed in bold under their respective pages, whereas territories and dependencies are not. Disputed and unrecognized countries are italicized.

== A ==
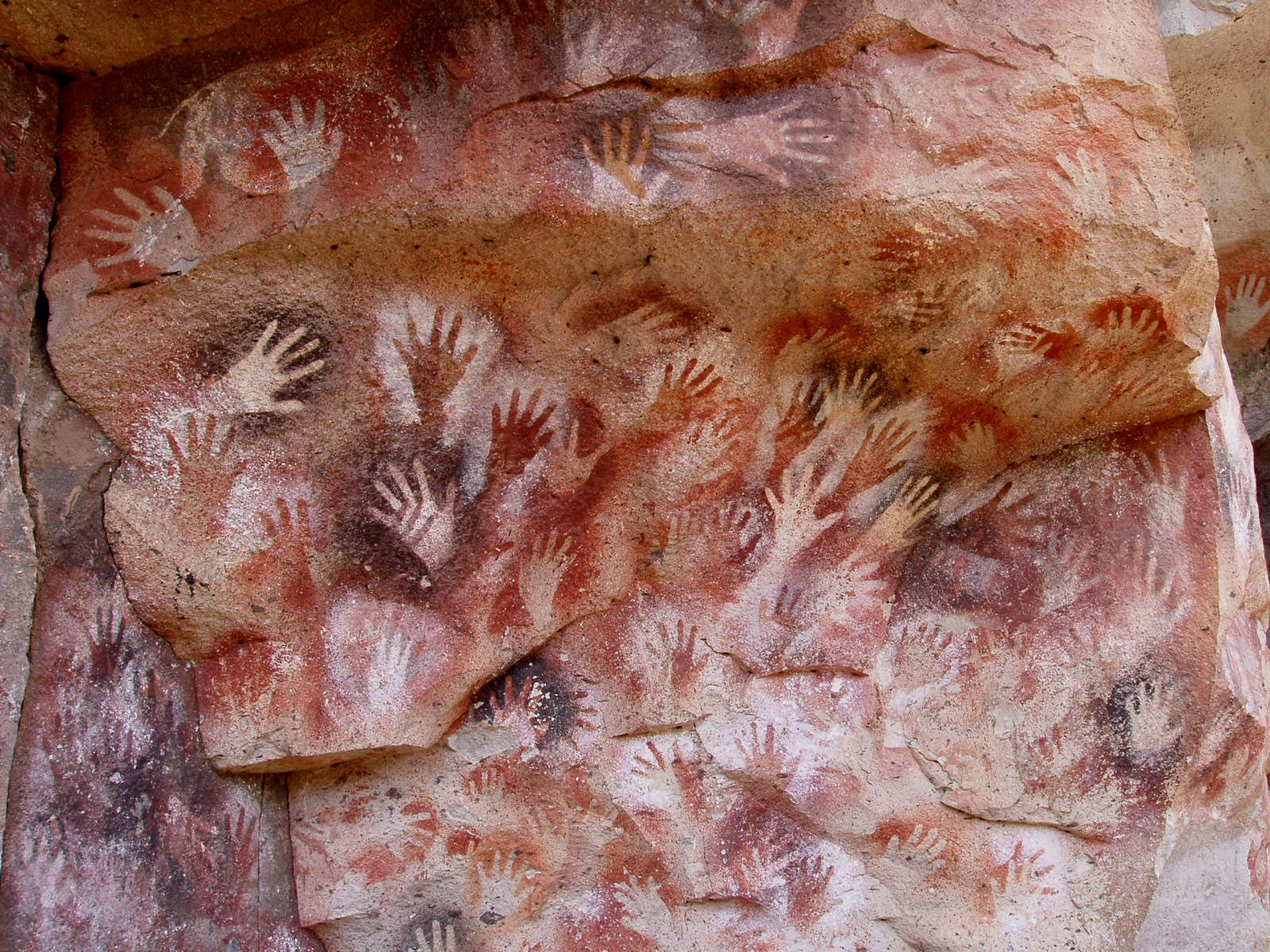
History of Argentina

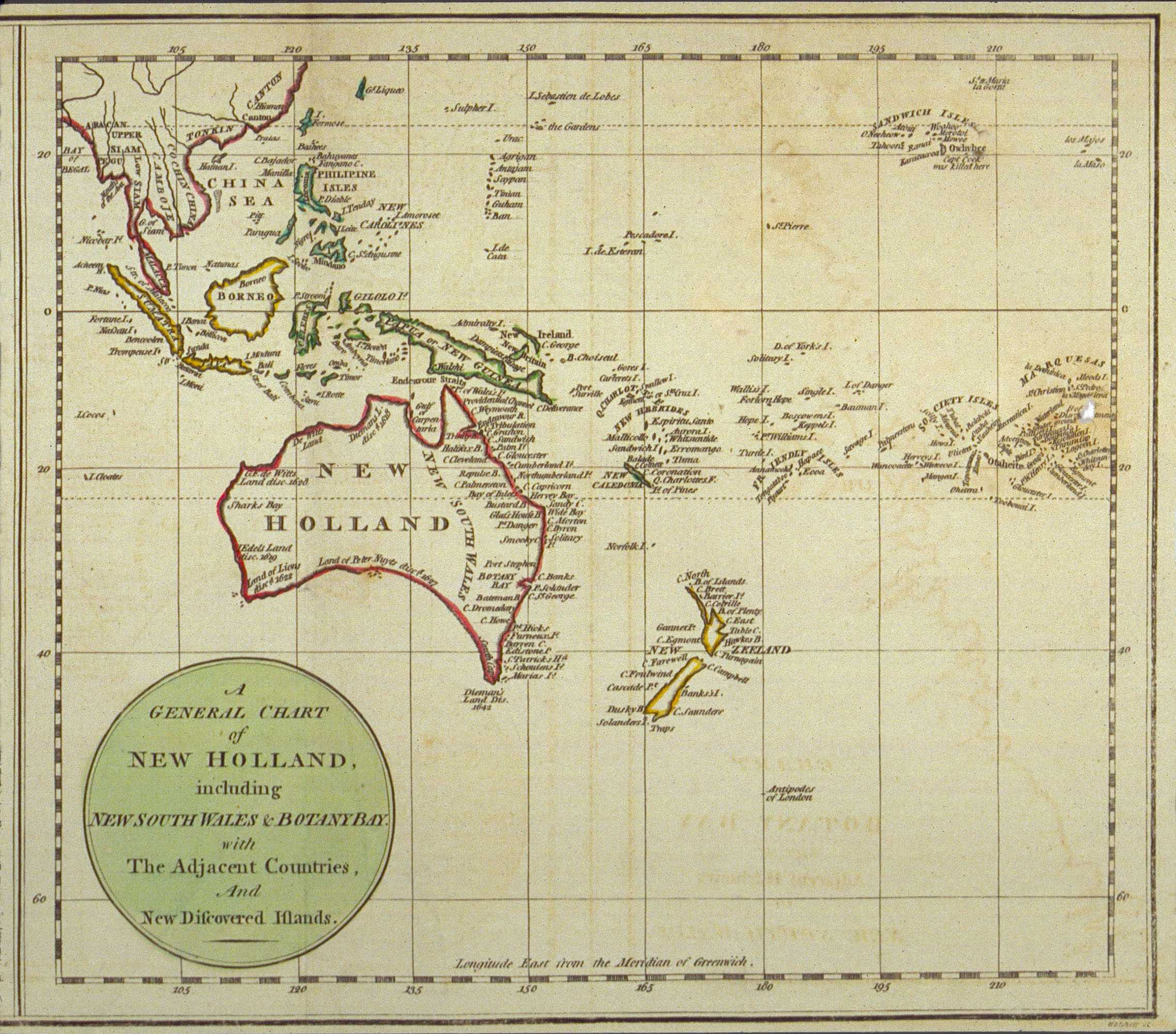
History of Australia

- **History of Afghanistan** – Islamic Republic of Afghanistan
- **History of Albania** – Republic of Albania
- **History of Algeria** – People's Democratic Republic of Algeria
- **History of Andorra** – Principality of Andorra
- **History of Angola** – Republic of Angola
- **History of Antigua and Barbuda** – Antigua and Barbuda
- **History of Argentina** – Argentine Republic
- **History of Armenia** – Republic of Armenia
- **History of Aruba** – Aruba (Dutch crown dependency)
- **History of Australia** – Commonwealth of Australia
- **History of Austria** – Republic of Austria
- **History of Azerbaijan** – Republic of Azerbaijan

== B ==
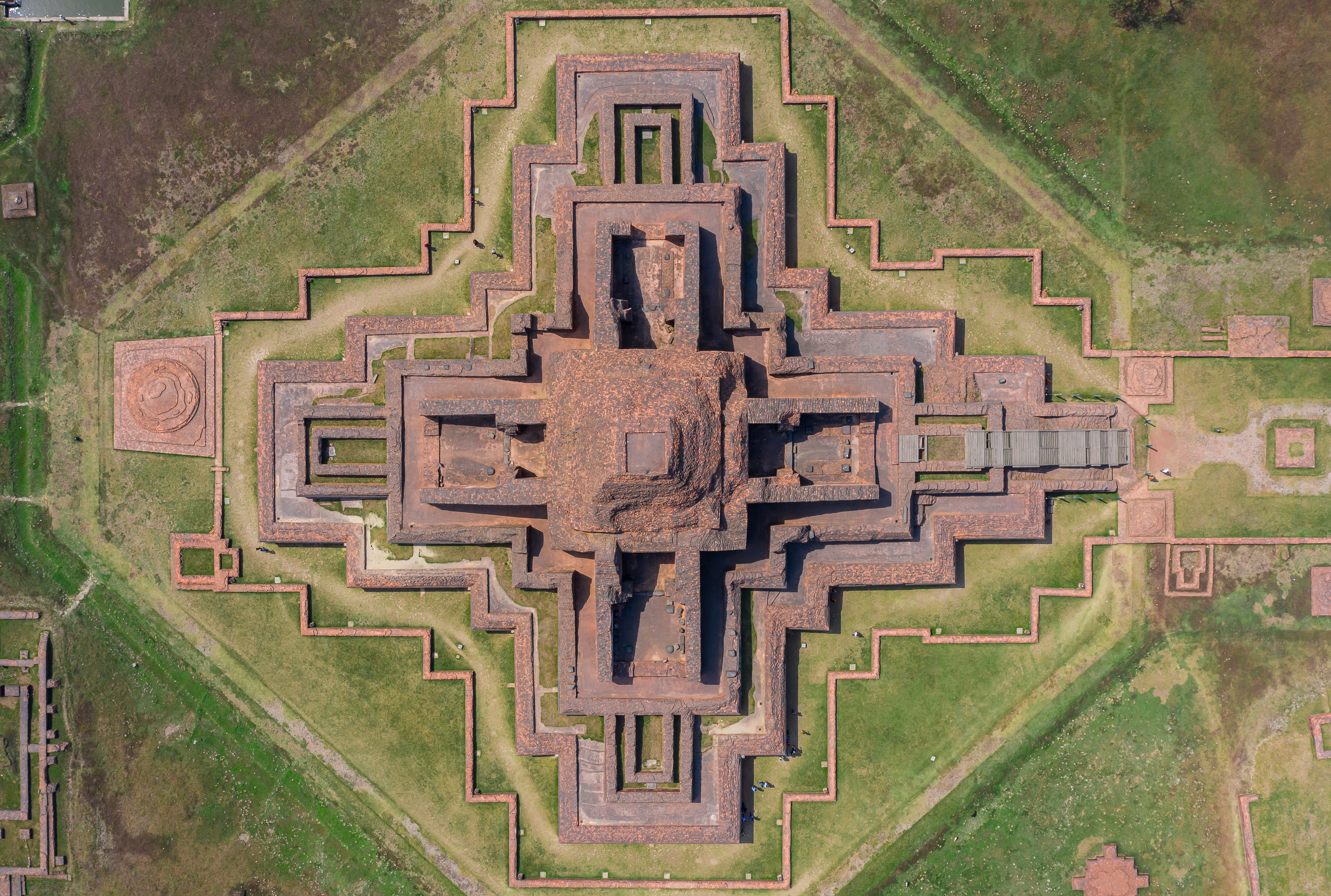
History of Bangladesh

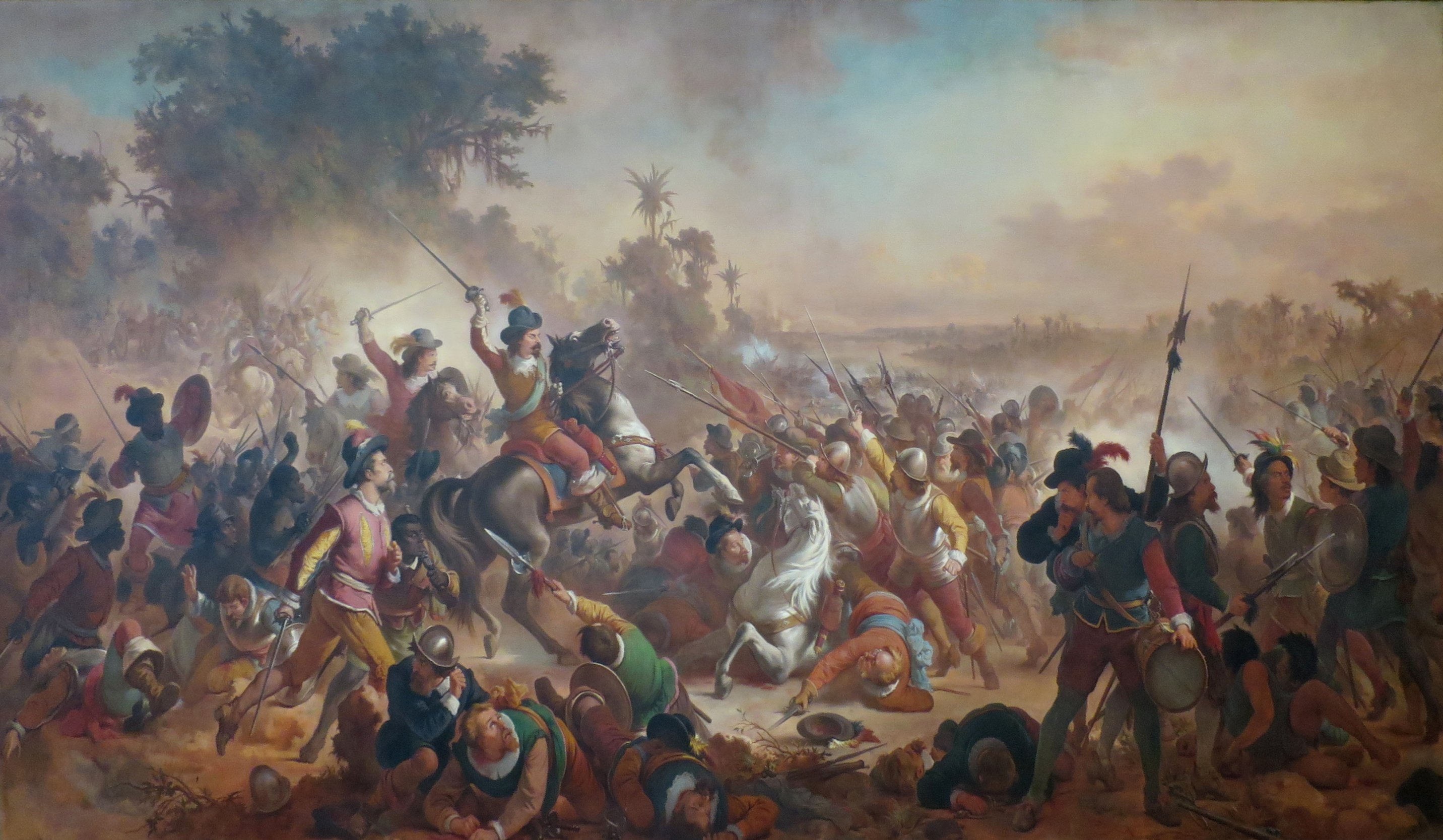
History of Brazil

- **History of the Bahamas** – Commonwealth of The Bahamas
- **History of Bahrain** – Kingdom of Bahrain
- **History of Bangladesh** – People's Republic of Bangladesh
- **History of Barbados** – Barbados
- **History of Belarus** – Republic of Belarus
- **History of Belgium** – Kingdom of Belgium
- **History of Belize** – Belize
- **History of Benin** – Republic of Benin
- **History of Bermuda** – Bermuda
- **History of Bhutan** – Kingdom of Bhutan
- **History of Bolivia** – Plurinational State of Bolivia
- **History of Bosnia and Herzegovina** – Bosnia and Herzegovina
- **History of Botswana** – Republic of Botswana
- **History of Brazil** – Federative Republic of Brazil
- **History of Brunei** – State of Brunei Darussalam
- **History of Bulgaria** – Republic of Bulgaria
- **History of Burkina Faso** – Burkina Faso
- **History of Burundi** – Republic of Burundi

== C ==
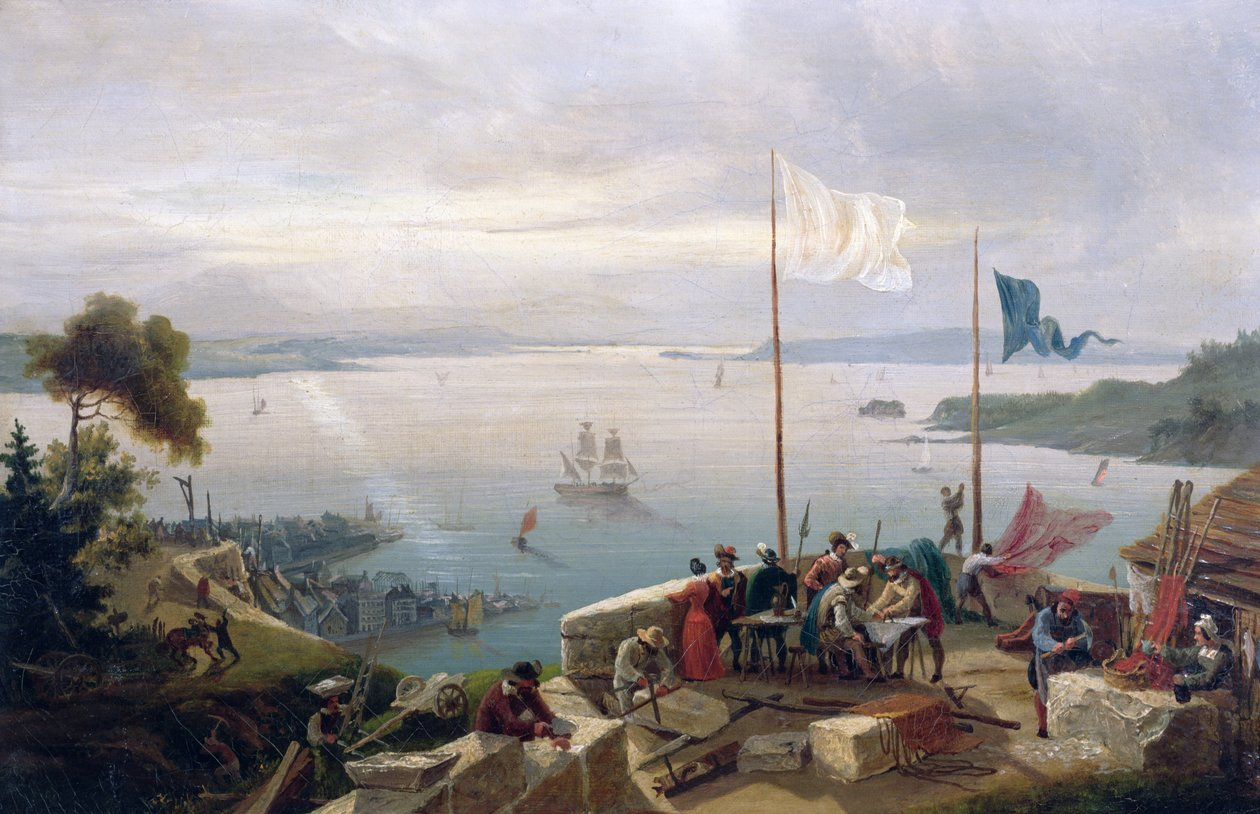
History of Canada

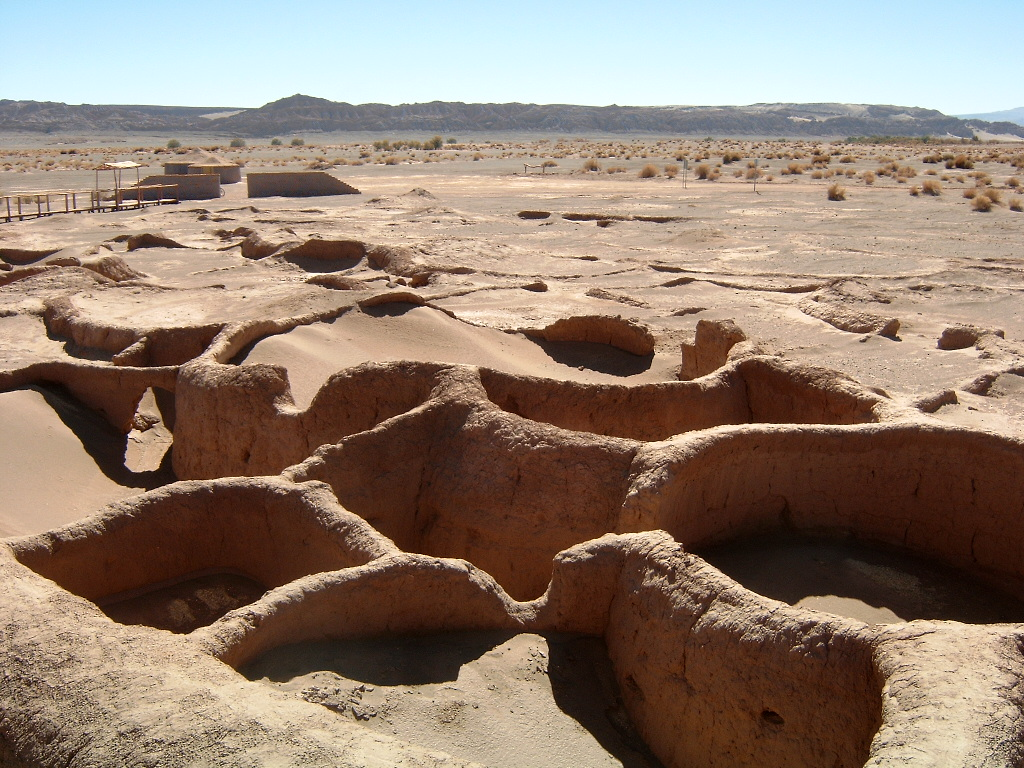
History of Chile

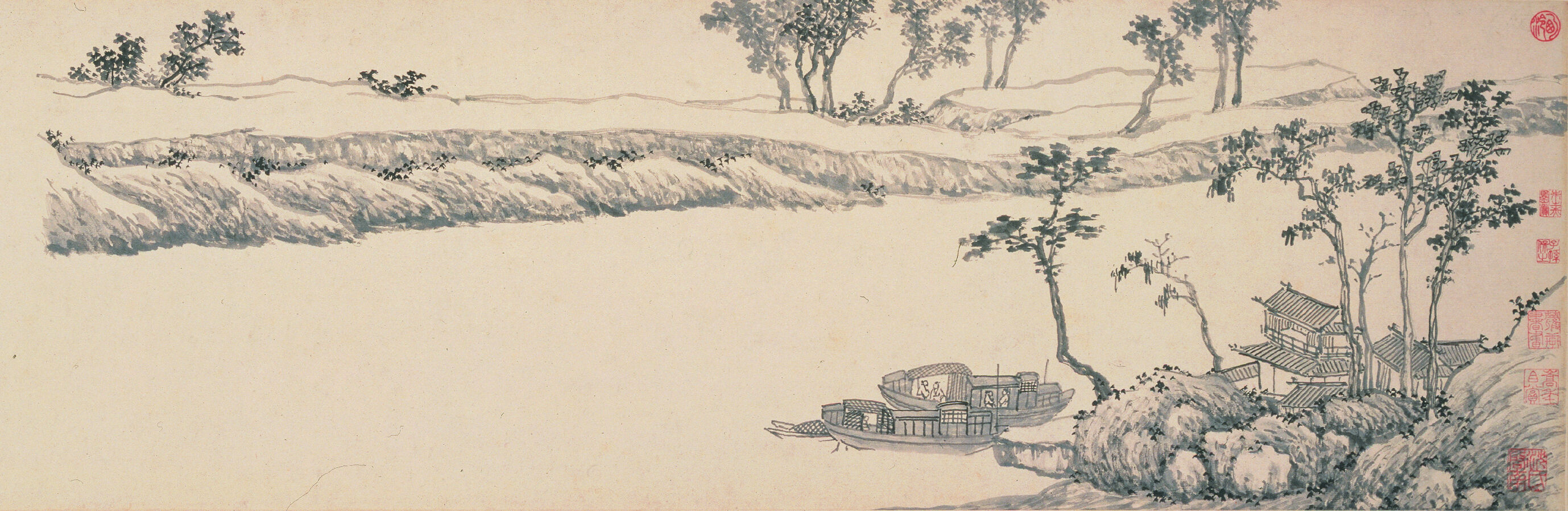
History of China

- **History of Cambodia** – Kingdom of Cambodia
- **History of Cameroon** – Republic of Cameroon
- **History of Canada** – Canada
- **History of Cape Verde** – Republic of Cape Verde
- **History of the Cayman Islands** – Cayman Islands (UK overseas territory)
- **History of the Central African Republic** – Central African Republic
- **History of Chad** – Republic of Chad
- **History of Chile** – Republic of Chile
- **History of China** – People's Republic of China
- **History of Colombia** – Republic of Colombia
- **History of Comoros** – Union of the Comoros
- **History of the Democratic Republic of the Congo** – Democratic Republic of the Congo
- **History of the Republic of the Congo** – Republic of the Congo
- **History of Costa Rica** – Republic of Costa Rica
- (Ivory Coast) **History of Côte d'Ivoire** – Republic of Côte d'Ivoire
- **History of Croatia** – Republic of Croatia
- **History of Cuba** – Republic of Cuba
- **History of Cyprus** – Republic of Cyprus
- **History of the Czech Republic** – Czech Republic

== D ==
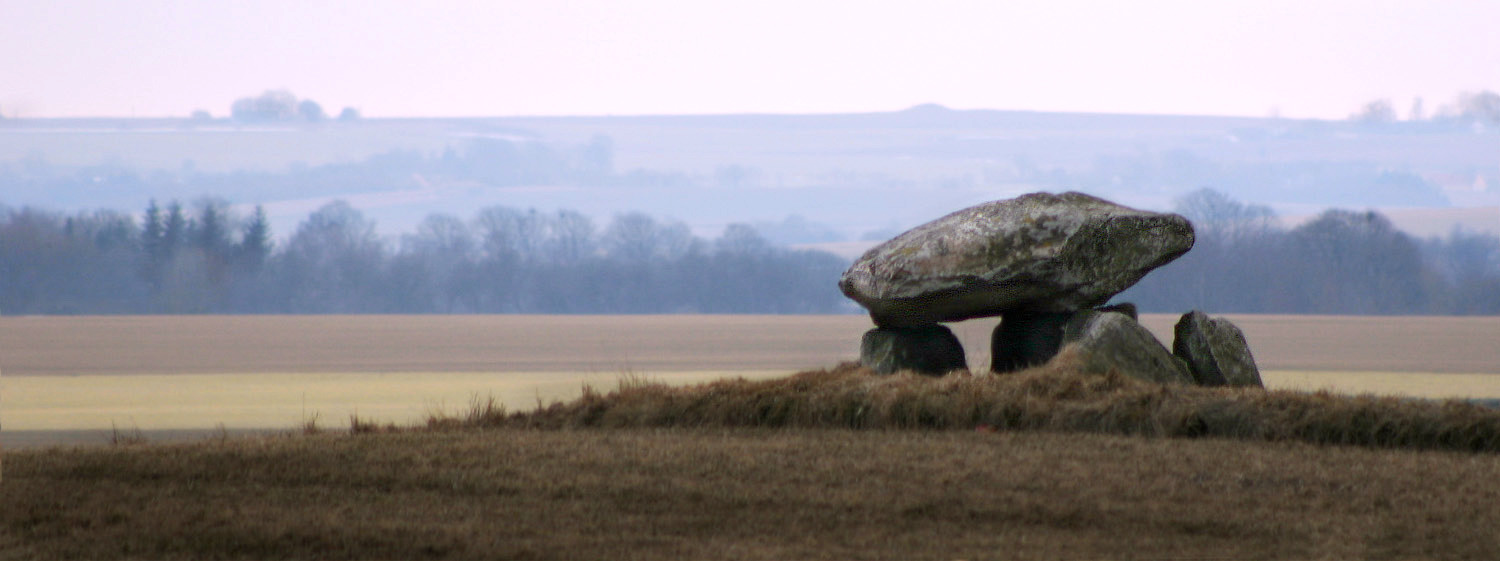
History of Denmark

- **History of Denmark** – Kingdom of Denmark
- **History of Djibouti** – Republic of Djibouti
- **History of Dominica** – Commonwealth of Dominica
- **History of the Dominican Republic** – Dominican Republic

== E ==
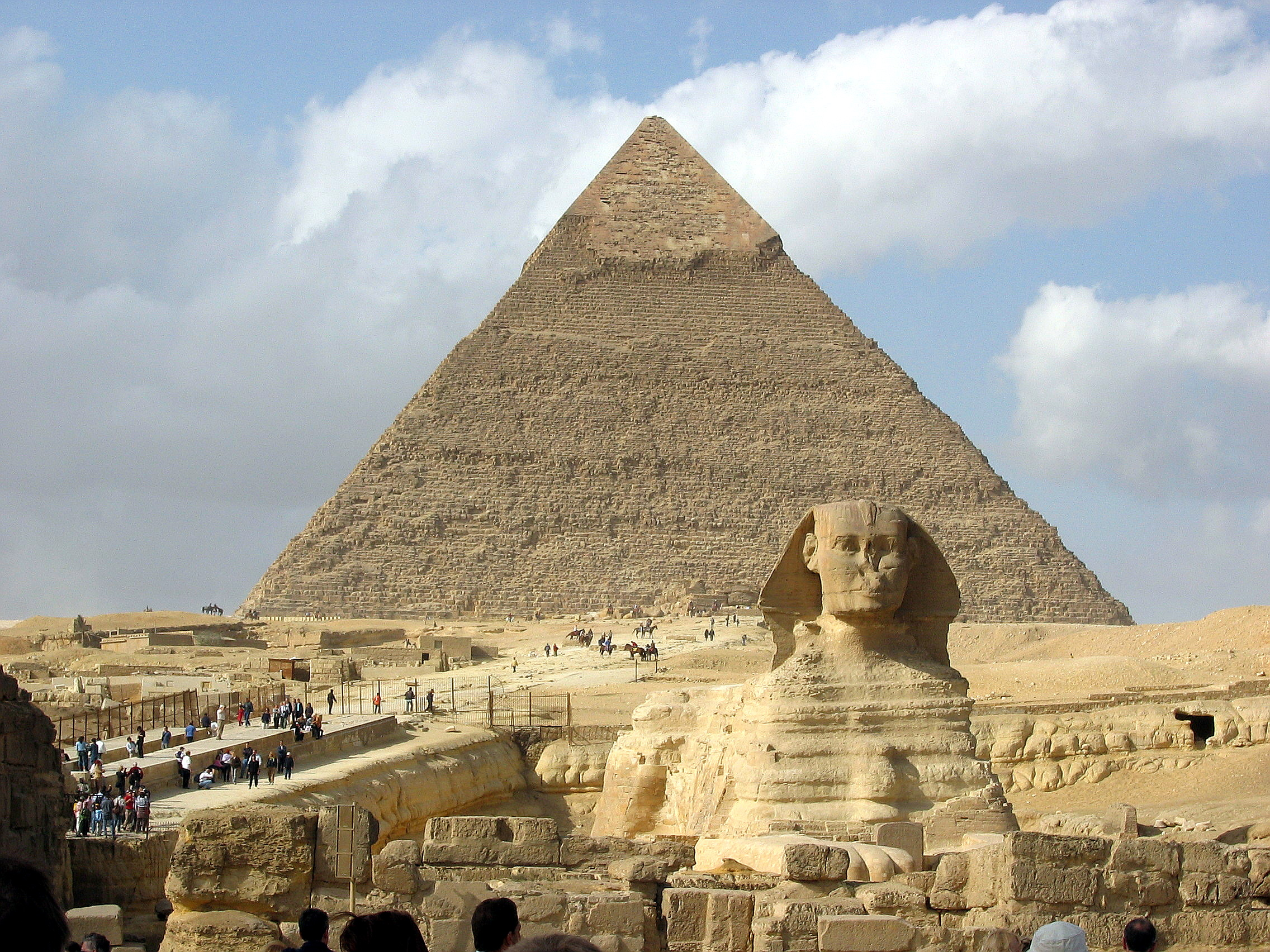
History of Egypt

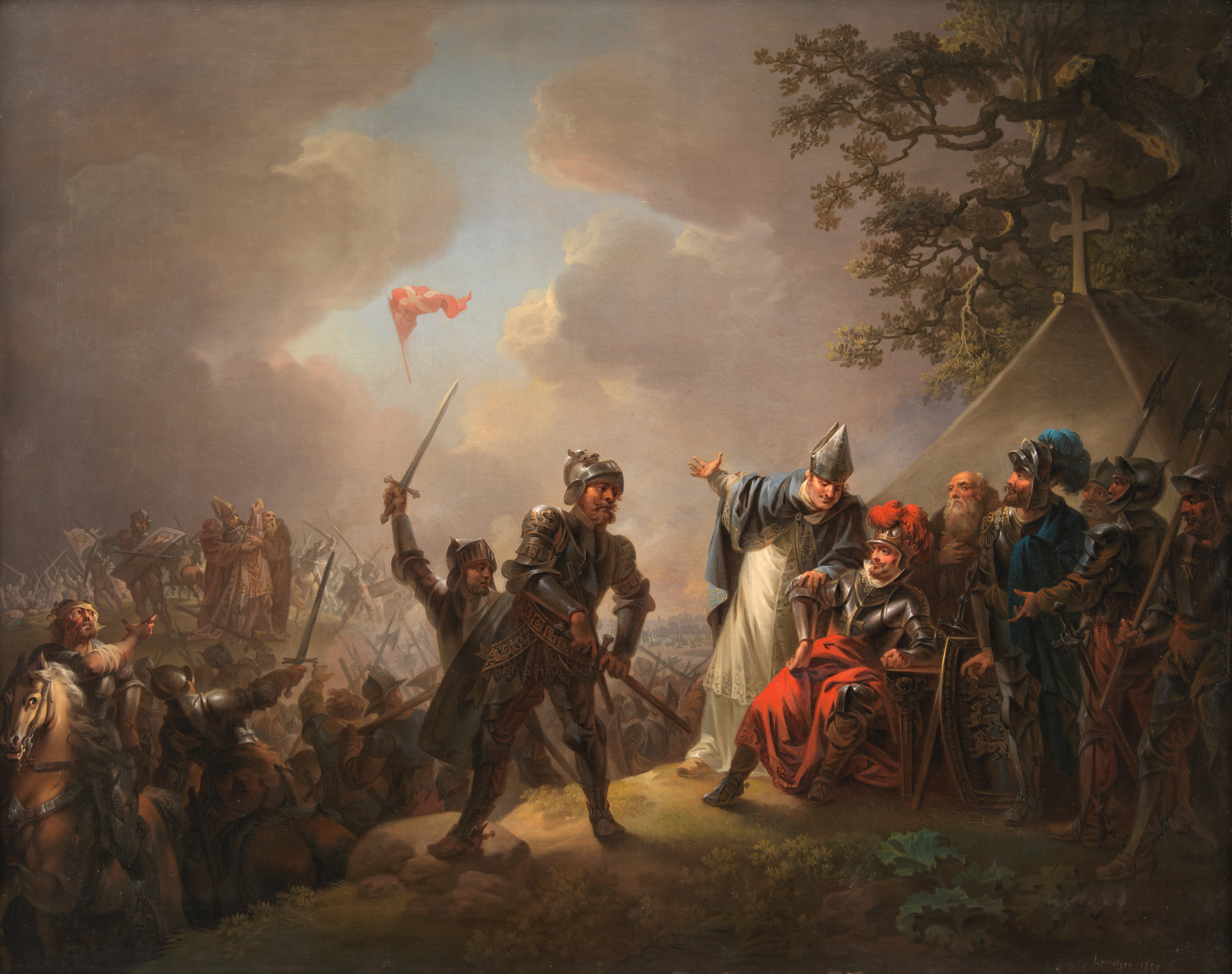
History of Estonia

- **History of Ecuador** – Republic of Ecuador
- **History of Egypt** – Arab Republic of Egypt
- **History of El Salvador** – Republic of El Salvador
- **History of Equatorial Guinea** – Republic of Equatorial Guinea
- **History of Eritrea** – State of Eritrea
- **History of Estonia** – Republic of Estonia
- **History of Eswatini (Swaziland)** – Kingdom of Eswatini
- **History of Ethiopia** – Federal Democratic Republic of Ethiopia

== F ==
History of France

- **History of the Falkland Islands** – Falkland Islands (British overseas territories)
- **History of the Faroe Islands** – Faroe Islands (Self-governing country in the Kingdom of Denmark)
- **History of Fiji** – Republic of the Fiji Islands
- **History of Finland** – Republic of Finland
- **History of France** – French Republic
- **History of French Guiana** – French Guiana (French overseas community)
- **History of French Polynesia** – French Polynesia (French overseas community)

== G ==
- **History of Gabon** – Gabonese Republic
- **History of the Gambia** – Republic of The Gambia
- See History of Palestine for Gaza Strip
- (Georgia (country)) **History of Georgia** – Georgia
- **History of Germany** – Federal Republic of Germany
- **History of Ghana** – Republic of Ghana
- **History of Gibraltar** – Gibraltar (UK overseas territory)
- **History of Greece** – Hellenic Republic
- **History of Greenland** – Greenland (Self-governing country in the Kingdom of Denmark)
- **History of Grenada** – Grenada
- **History of Guadeloupe** – Guadeloupe (French overseas community)
- **History of Guam** – Territory of Guam (US overseas territory)
- **History of Guatemala** – Republic of Guatemala
- **History of Guinea** – Republic of Guinea
- **History of Guinea-Bissau** – Republic of Guinea-Bissau
- **History of Guyana** – Co-operative Republic of Guyana

== H ==
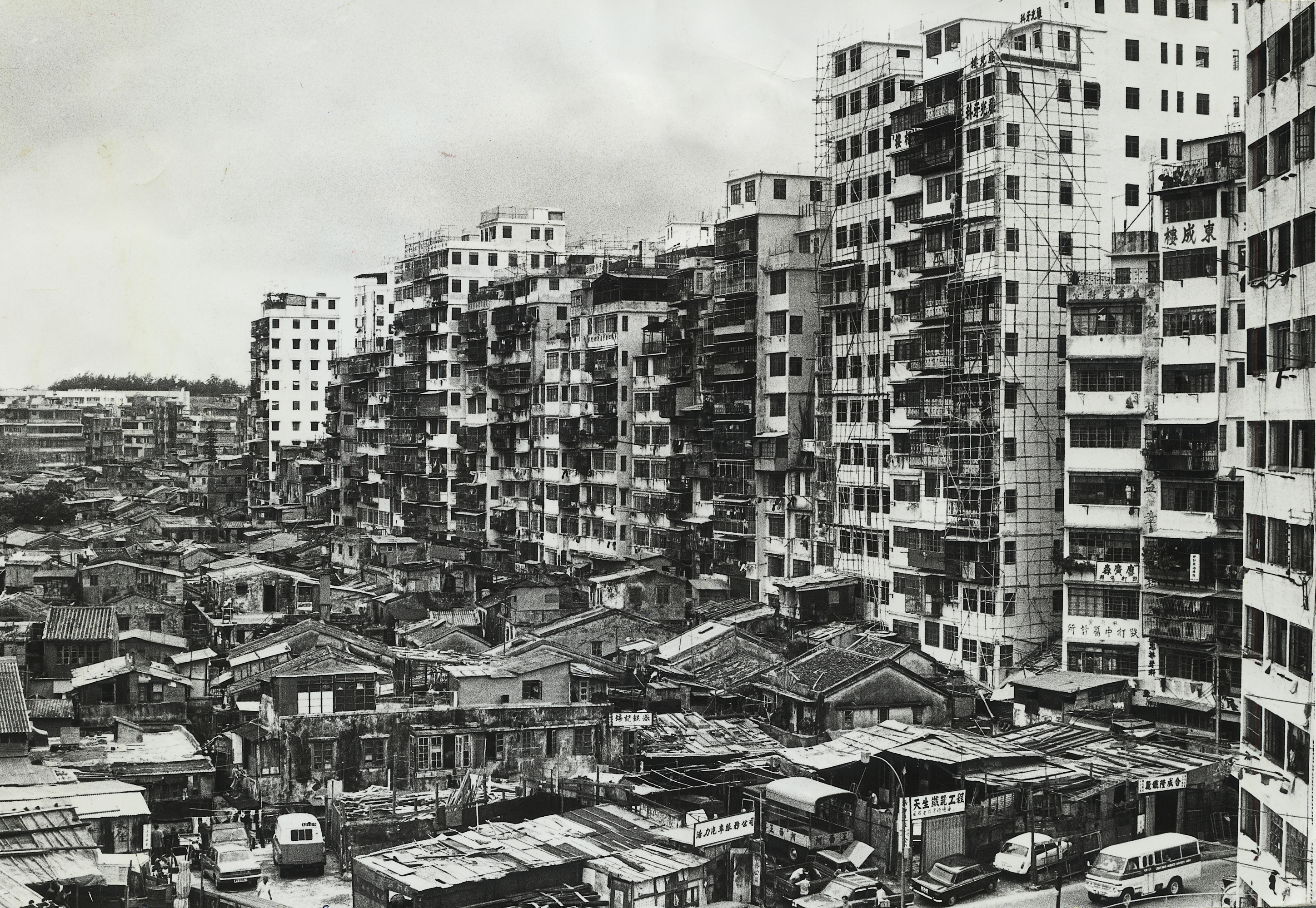
History of Hong Kong

- **History of Haiti** – Republic of Haiti
- **History of Honduras** – Republic of Honduras
- **History of Hong Kong** – Hong Kong Special Administrative Region of the People's Republic of China (Area of special sovereignty)
- **History of Hungary** – Republic of Hungary

== I ==
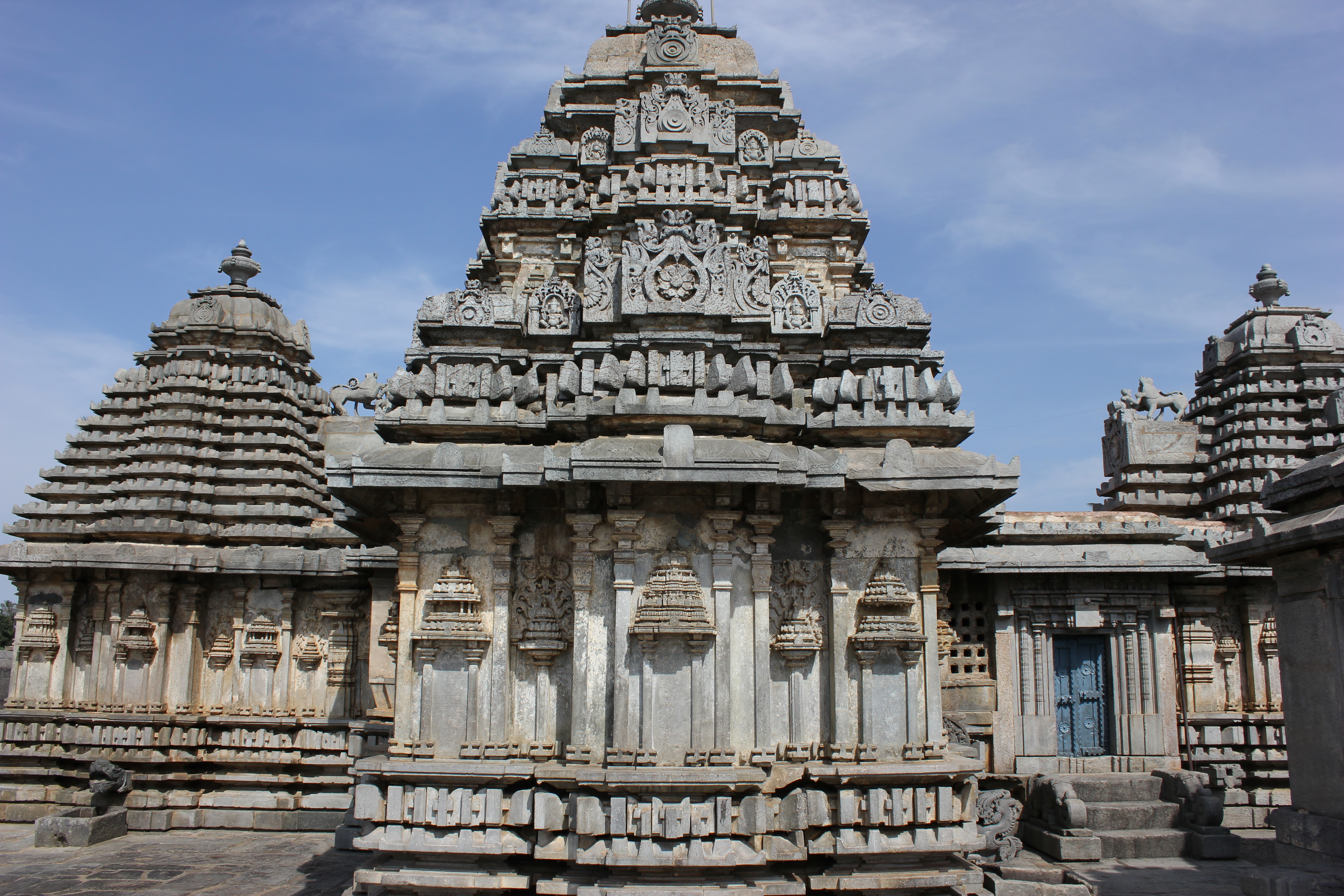
History of India

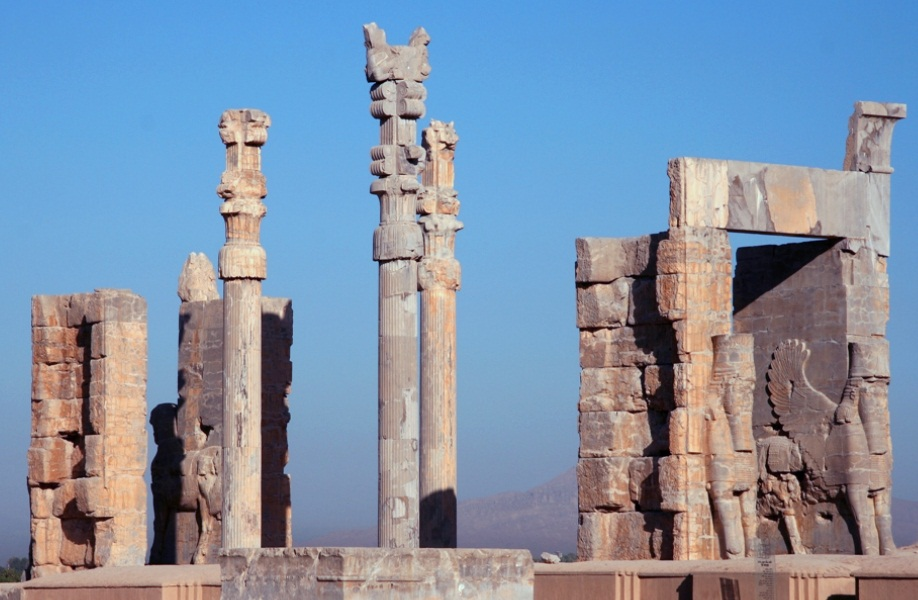
History of Iran

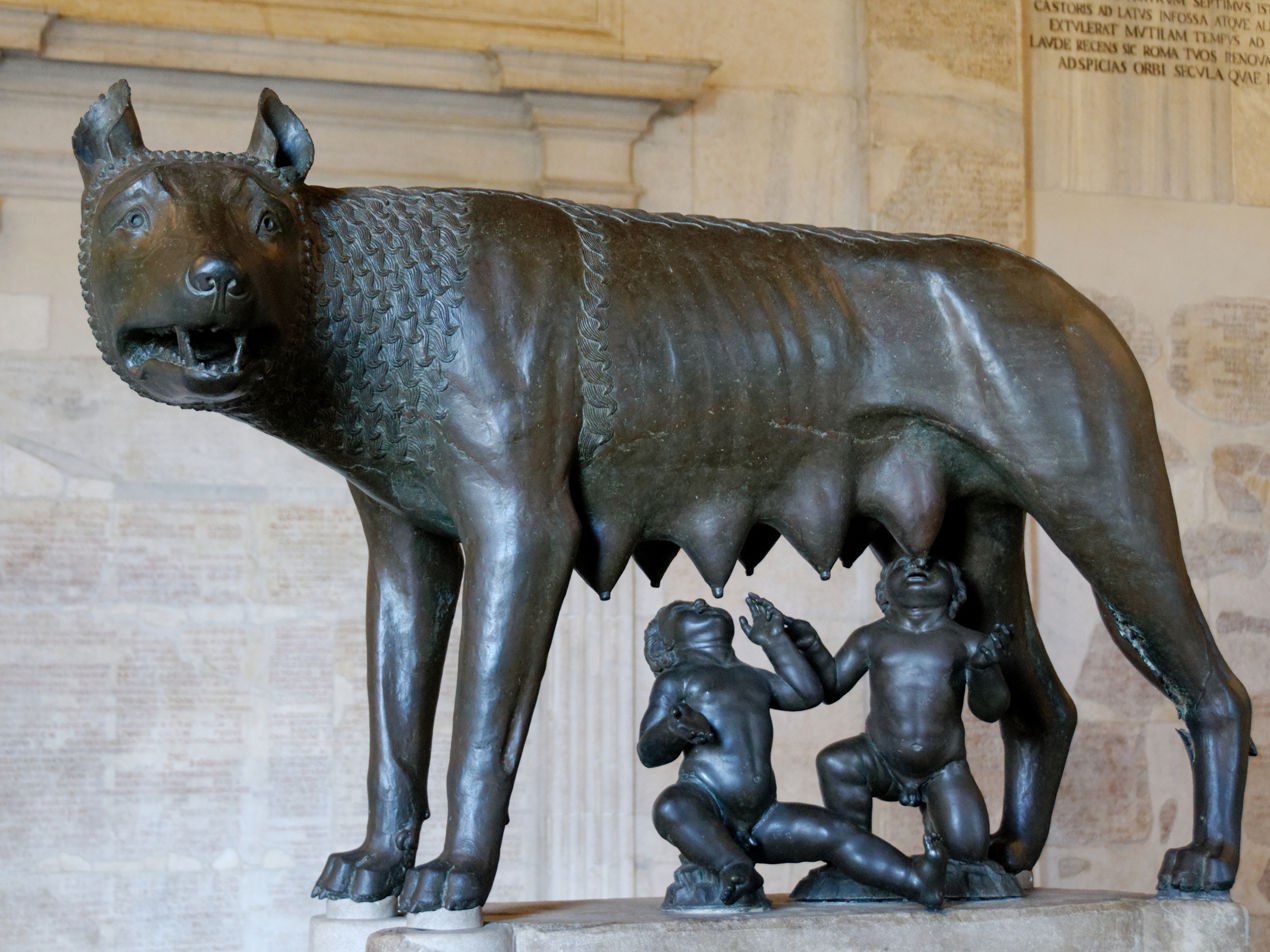
History of Italy

- **History of Iceland** – Republic of Iceland
- **History of India** – Republic of India
- **History of Indonesia** – Republic of Indonesia
- **History of Iran** – Islamic Republic of Iran
- **History of Iraq** – Republic of Iraq
- (Republic of Ireland) **History of Ireland** – Ireland
- See History of the Falkland Islands for Islas Malvinas
- **History of the Isle of Man** – Isle of Man (British Crown dependency)
- **History of Israel** – State of Israel
- **History of Italy** – Italian Republic

== J ==
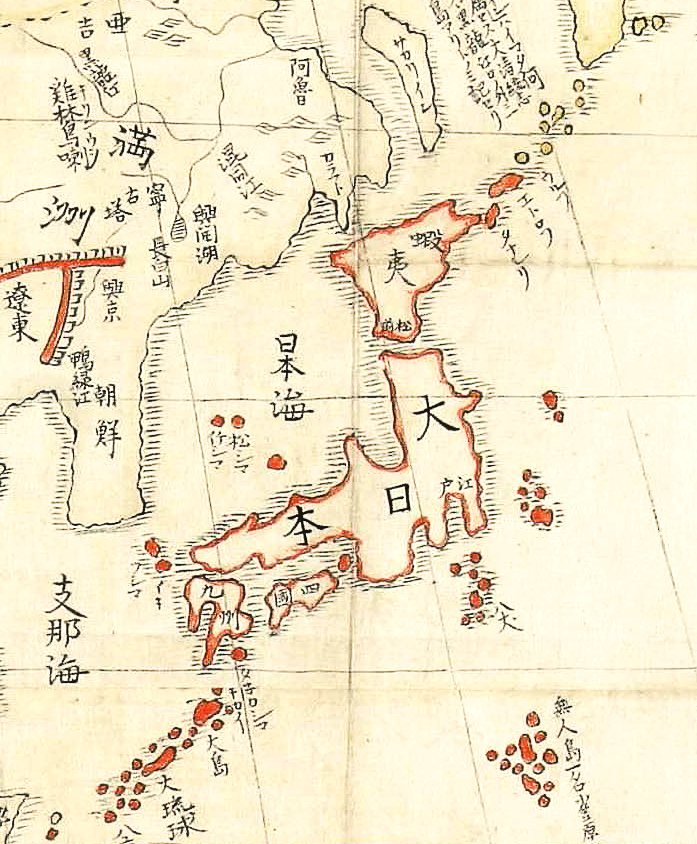
History of Japan

- **History of Jamaica** – Jamaica
- **History of Japan** – Japan
- **History of Jersey** – Jersey (British crown dependency)
- **History of Jordan** – Hashemite Kingdom of Jordan

== K ==
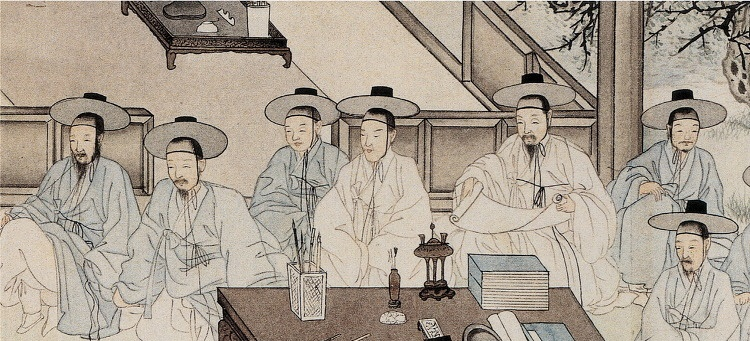
History of Korea

- **History of Kazakhstan** – Republic of Kazakhstan
- **History of Kenya** – Republic of Kenya
- **History of Kiribati** – Republic of Kiribati
- **History of North Korea** – Democratic People's Republic of Korea
- **History of South Korea (Republic of)** – Republic of Korea
- **History of Kosovo** – Kosovo Republic
- **History of Kuwait** – State of Kuwait
- **History of Kyrgyzstan** – Kyrgyz Republic

== L ==
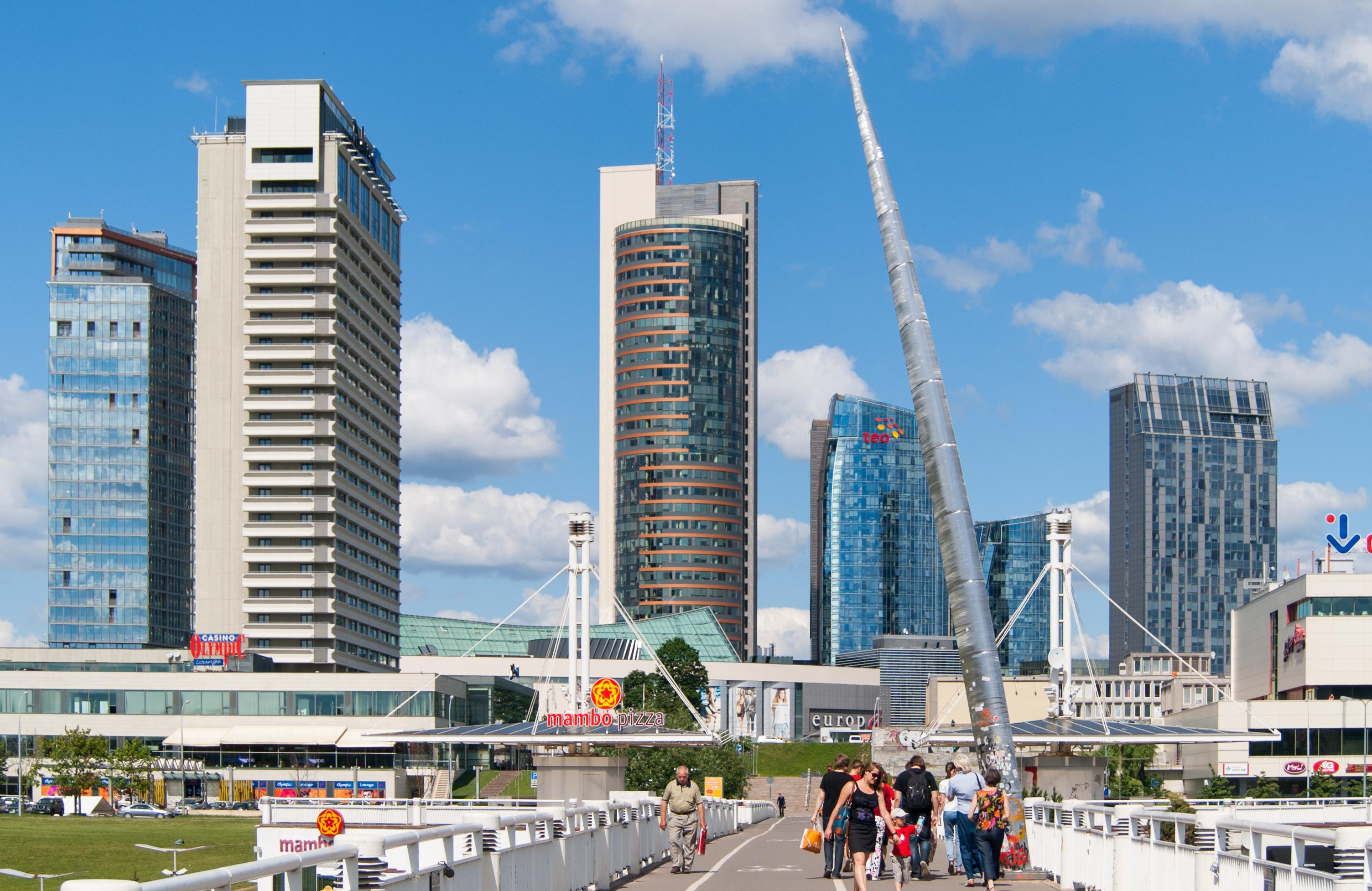
History of Lithuania

- **History of Laos** – Lao People's Democratic Republic
- **History of Latvia** – Republic of Latvia
- **History of Lebanon** – Republic of Lebanon
- **History of Lesotho** – Kingdom of Lesotho
- **History of Liberia** – Republic of Liberia
- **History of Libya** – Great Socialist People's Libyan Arab Jamahiriya
- **History of Liechtenstein** – Principality of Liechtenstein
- **History of Lithuania** – Republic of Lithuania
- **History of Luxembourg** – Grand Duchy of Luxembourg
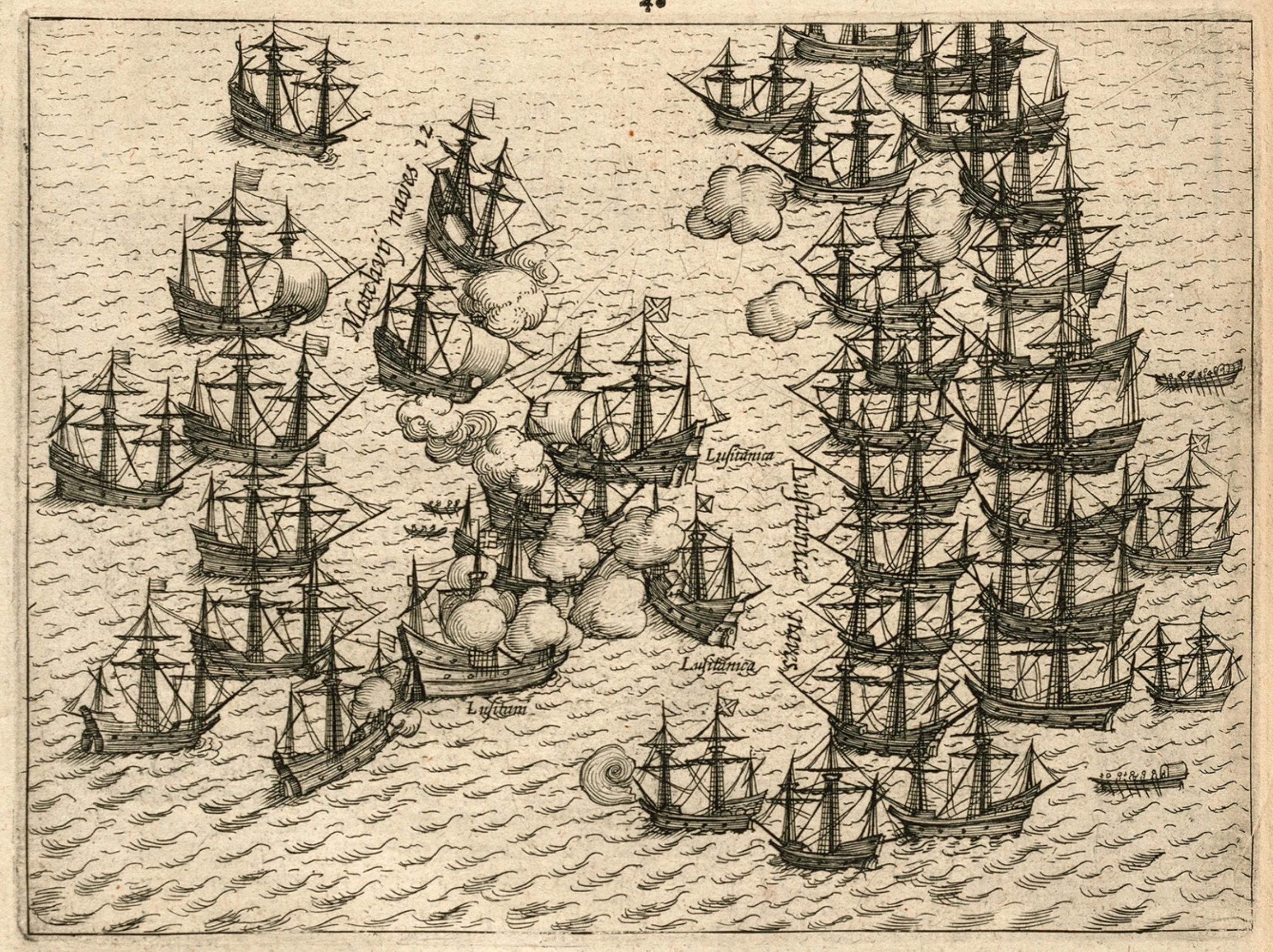
  History of Malaysia

== M ==
History of Mexico

History of Mongolia

- **History of Madagascar** – Republic of Madagascar
- **History of Malawi** – Republic of Malawi
- **History of Malaysia** – Malaysia
- **History of the Maldives** – Republic of Maldives
- **History of Mali** – Republic of Mali
- **History of Malta** – Republic of Malta
- **History of the Marshall Islands** – Republic of the Marshall Islands
- **History of Mauritania** – Islamic Republic of Mauritania
- **History of Mauritius** – Republic of Mauritius
- **History of Mayotte** – Mayotte (French overseas community)
- **History of Mexico** – United Mexican States
- **History of the Federated States of Micronesia** – Federated States of Micronesia
- **History of Moldova** – Republic of Moldova
- **History of Monaco** – Principality of Monaco
- **History of Mongolia** – Mongolia
- **History of Montenegro** – Republic of Montenegro
- **History of Montserrat** – Montserrat (UK overseas territory)
- **History of Morocco** – Kingdom of Morocco
- **History of Mozambique** – Republic of Mozambique
- **History of Myanmar** – Republic of the Union of Myanmar

== N ==
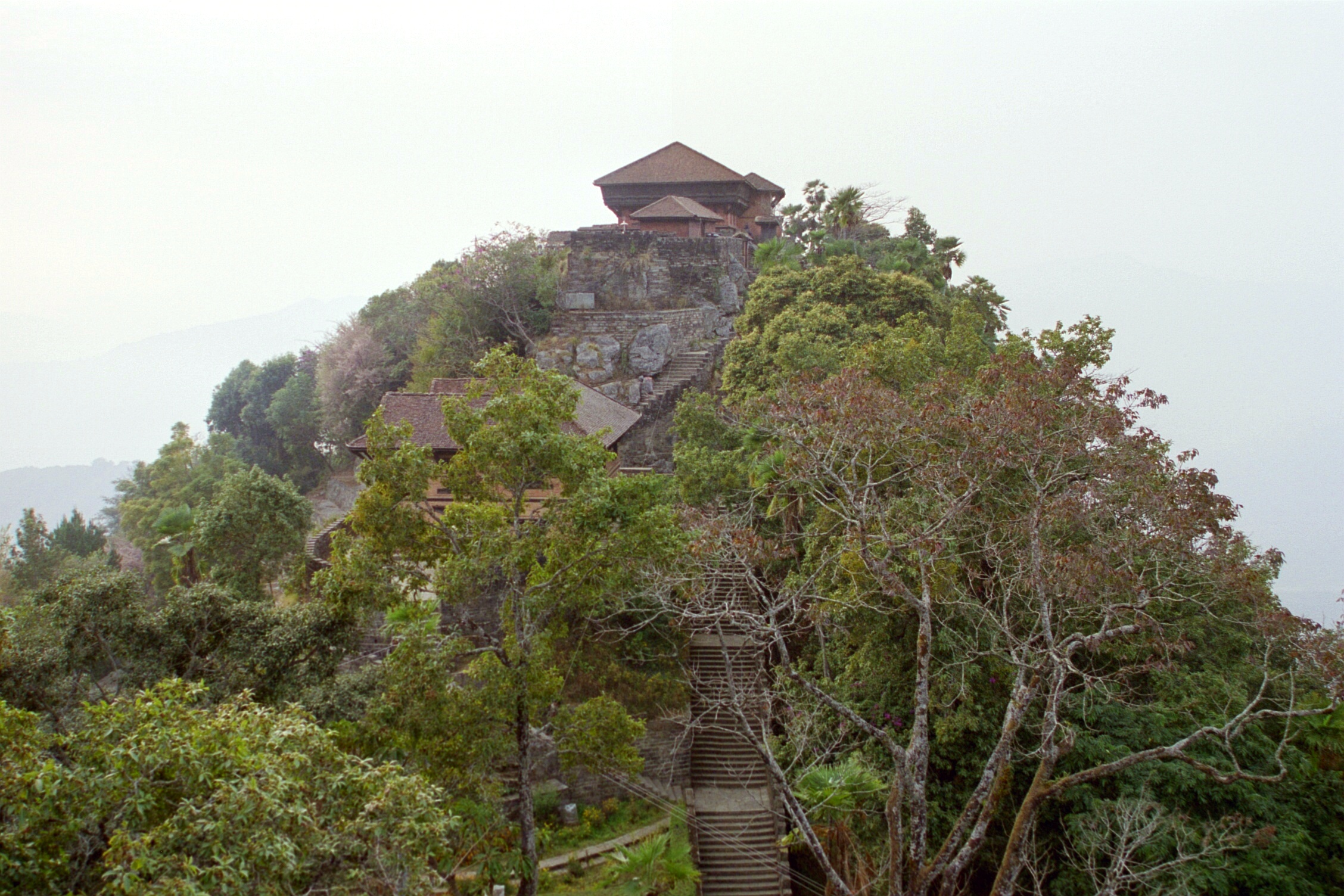
History of Nepal

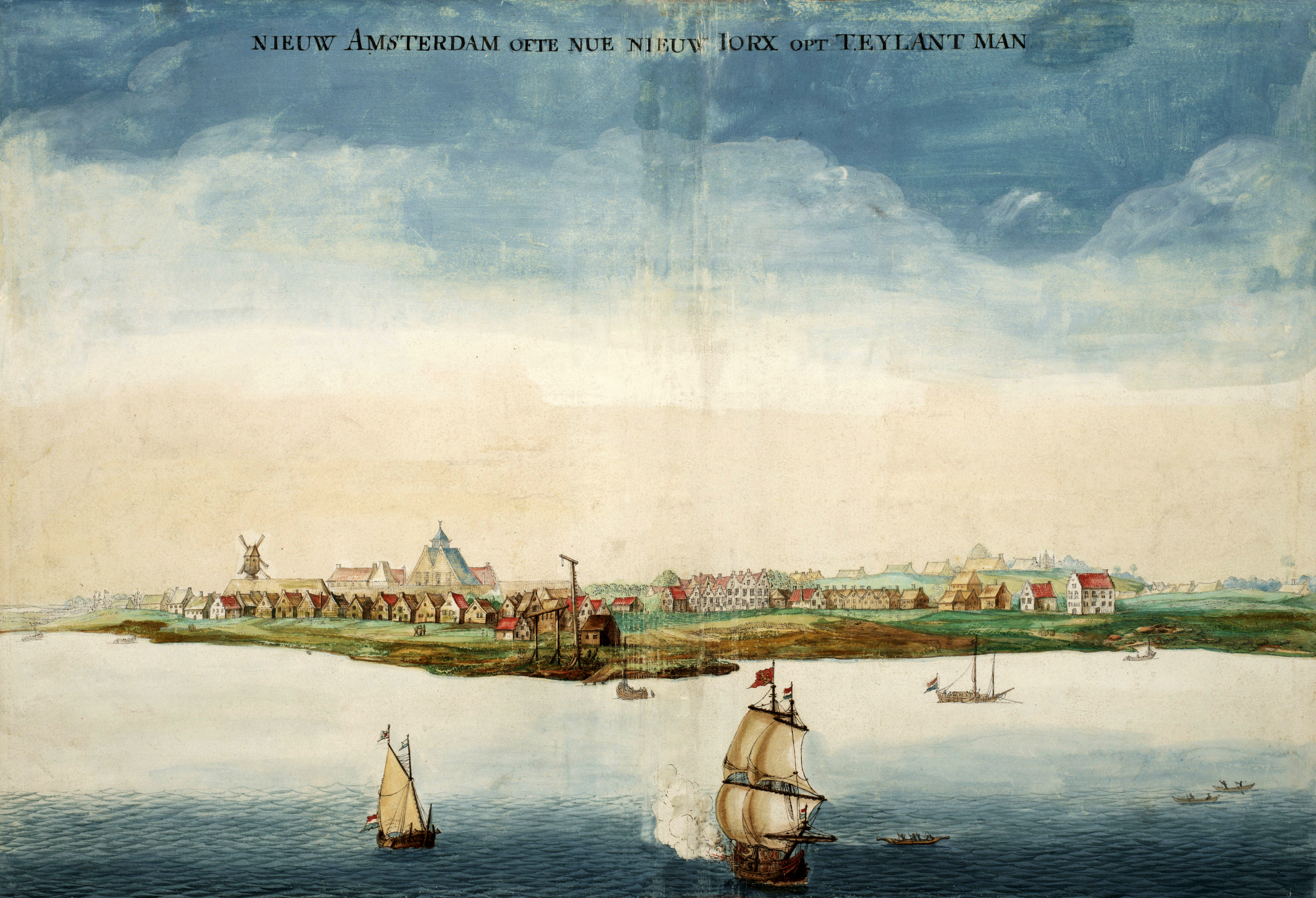
History of the Netherlands

- **History of Namibia** – Republic of Namibia
- **History of Nauru** – Republic of Nauru
- **History of Nepal** – Federal Democratic Republic of Nepal
- **History of the Netherlands** – Kingdom of the Netherlands
- **History of the Netherlands Antilles** – Netherlands Antilles (Self-governing country in the Kingdom of the Netherlands)
- **History of New Caledonia** – Territory of New Caledonia and Dependencies (French community sui generis)
- **History of New Zealand** – New Zealand
- **History of Nicaragua** – Republic of Nicaragua
- **History of Niger** – Republic of Niger
- **History of Nigeria** – Federal Republic of Nigeria
- **History of Niue** – Niue (Associated state of New Zealand)
- **History of Northern Cyprus** – Turkish Republic of Northern Cyprus
- **History of the Northern Mariana Islands** – Commonwealth of the Northern Mariana Islands (US overseas commonwealth)
- **History of North Macedonia** – North Macedonia
- **History of Norway** – Kingdom of Norway

== O ==
- **History of Oman** – Sultanate of Oman

== P ==
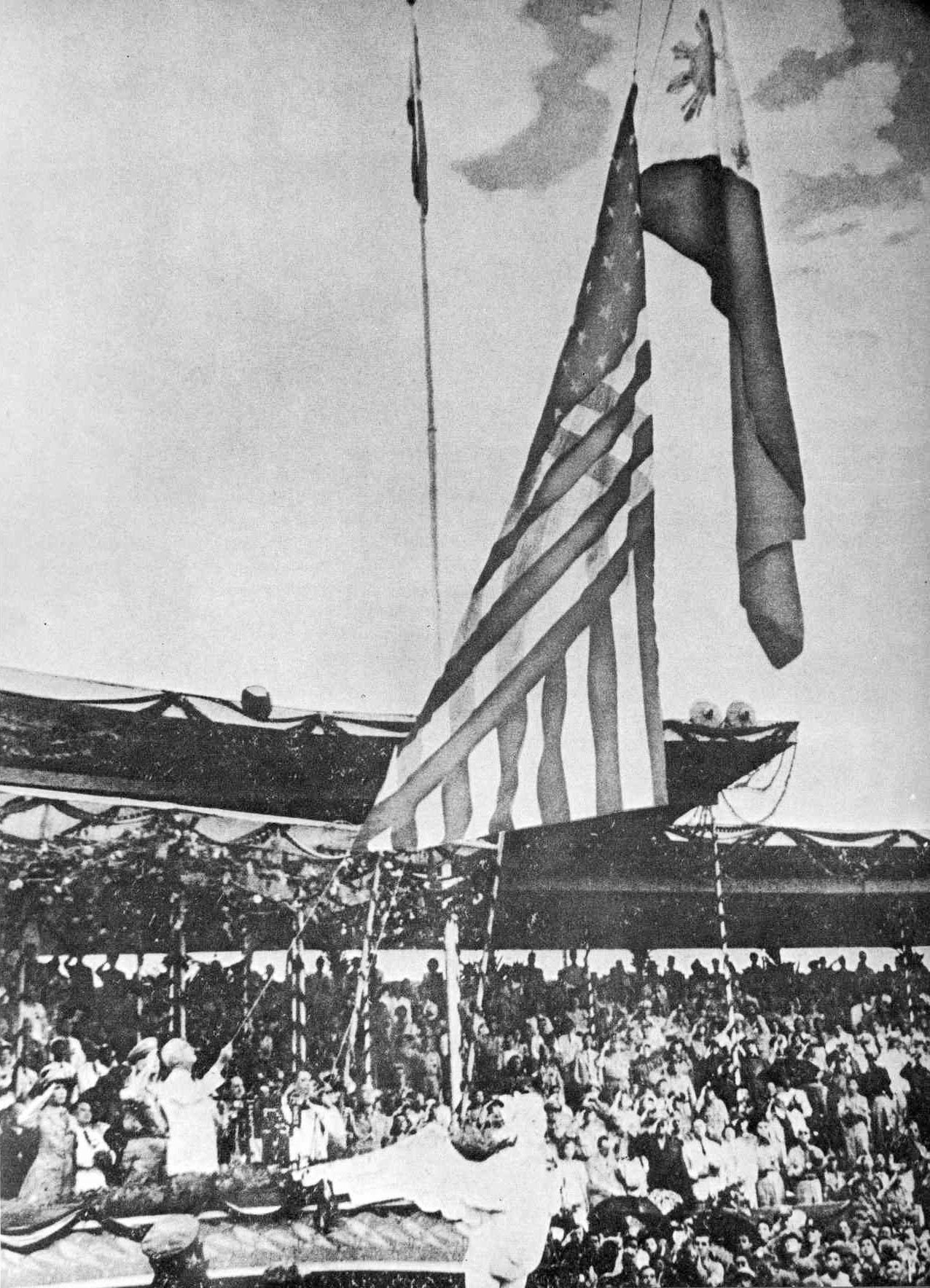
History of the Philippines

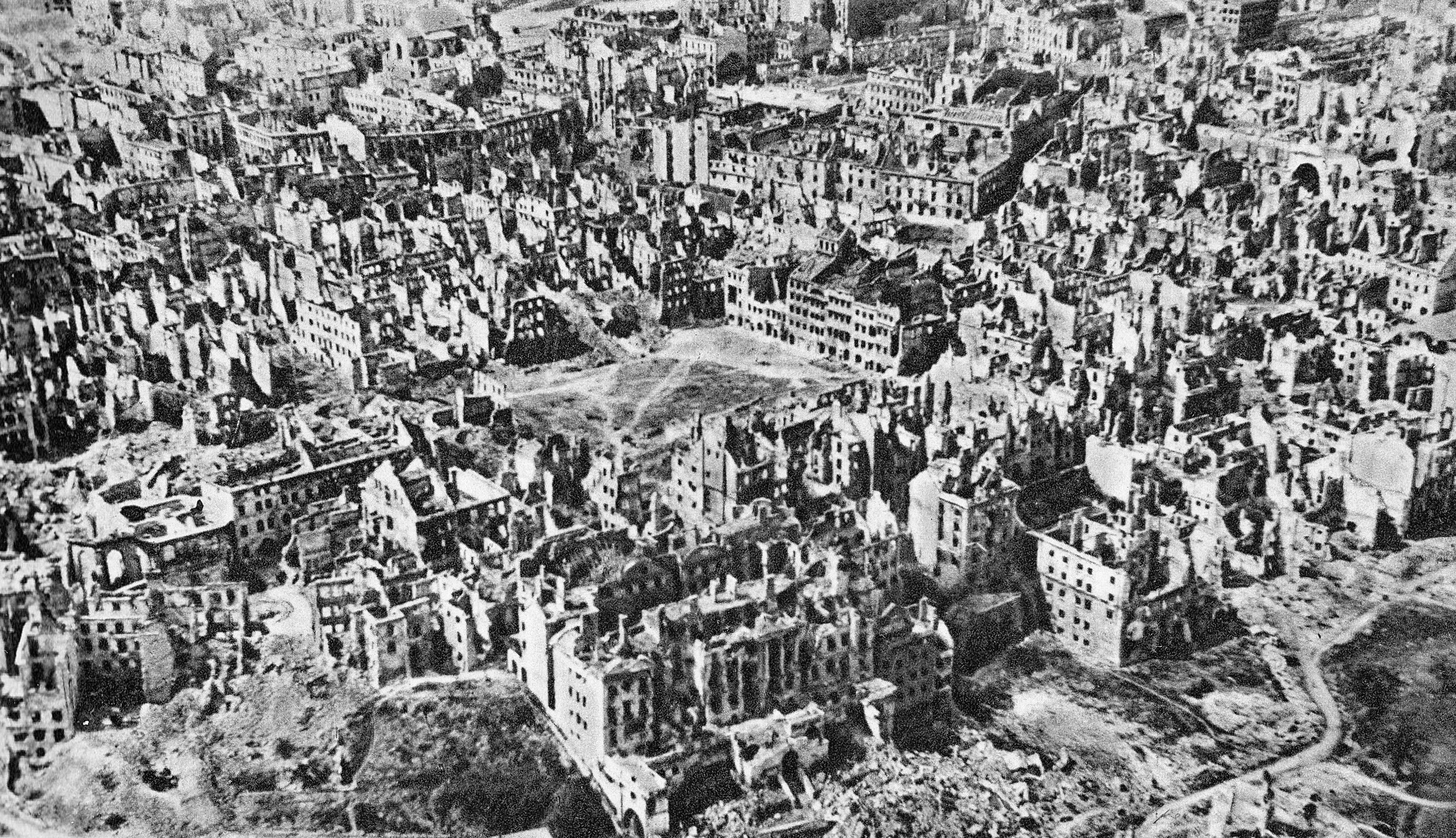
History of Poland

- **History of Pakistan** – Islamic Republic of Pakistan
- **History of Palau** – Republic of Palau
- (Palestinian Authority) **History of Palestine** – State of Palestine
- **History of Panama** – Republic of Panama
- **History of Papua New Guinea** – Independent State of Papua New Guinea
- **History of Paraguay** – Republic of Paraguay
- **History of Peru** – Republic of Peru
- **History of the Philippines** – Republic of the Philippines
- **History of the Pitcairn Islands** – Pitcairn, Henderson, Ducie, and Oeno Islands (UK overseas territory)
- **History of Poland** – Republic of Poland
- **History of Portugal** – Portuguese Republic
- **History of Puerto Rico** – Commonwealth of Puerto Rico (US overseas commonwealth)

== Q ==
- **History of Qatar** – State of Qatar

== R ==
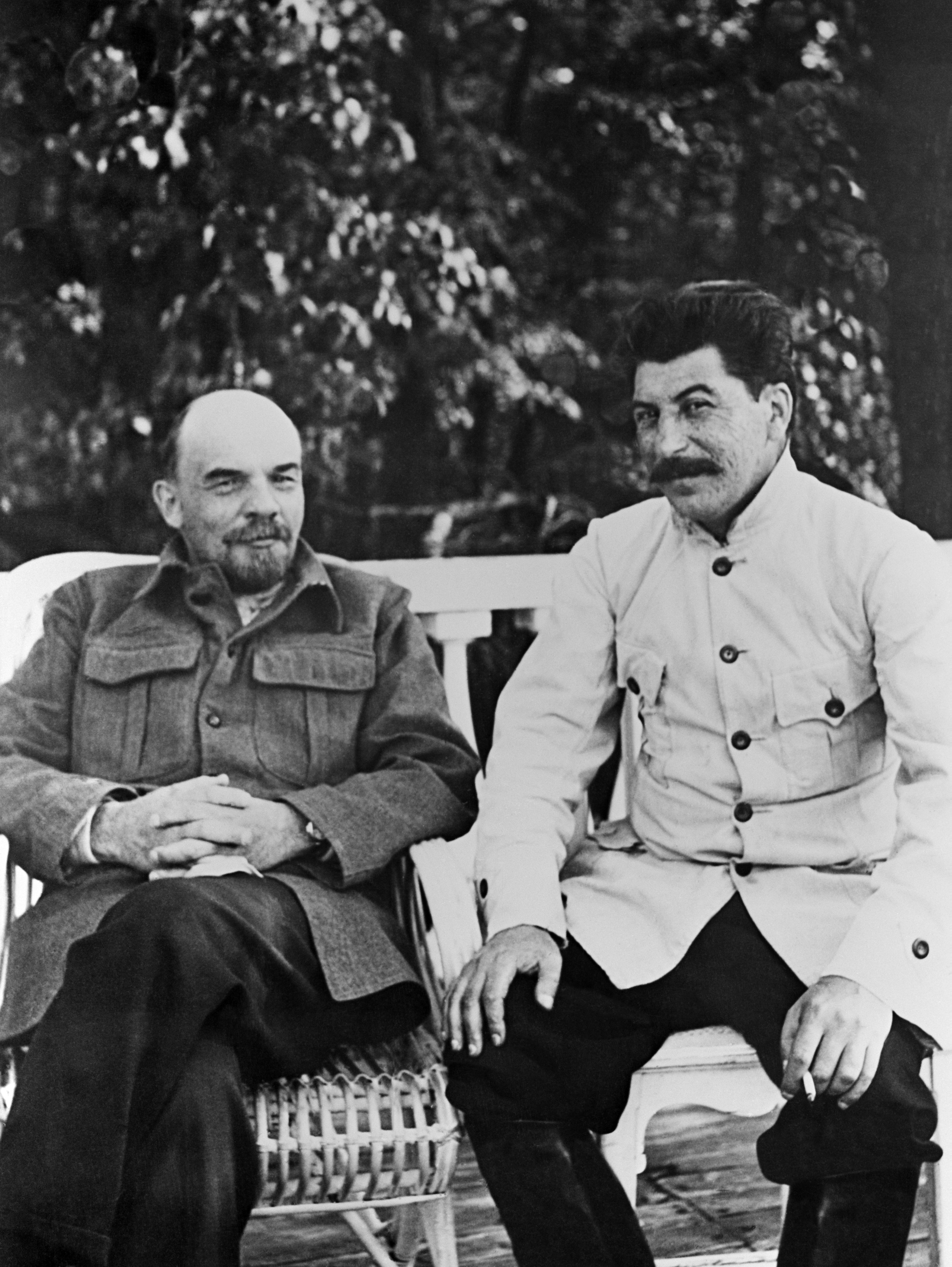
History of Russia

- **History of Romania** – Romania
- **History of Russia** – Russian Federation
- **History of Rwanda** – Republic of Rwanda

== S ==
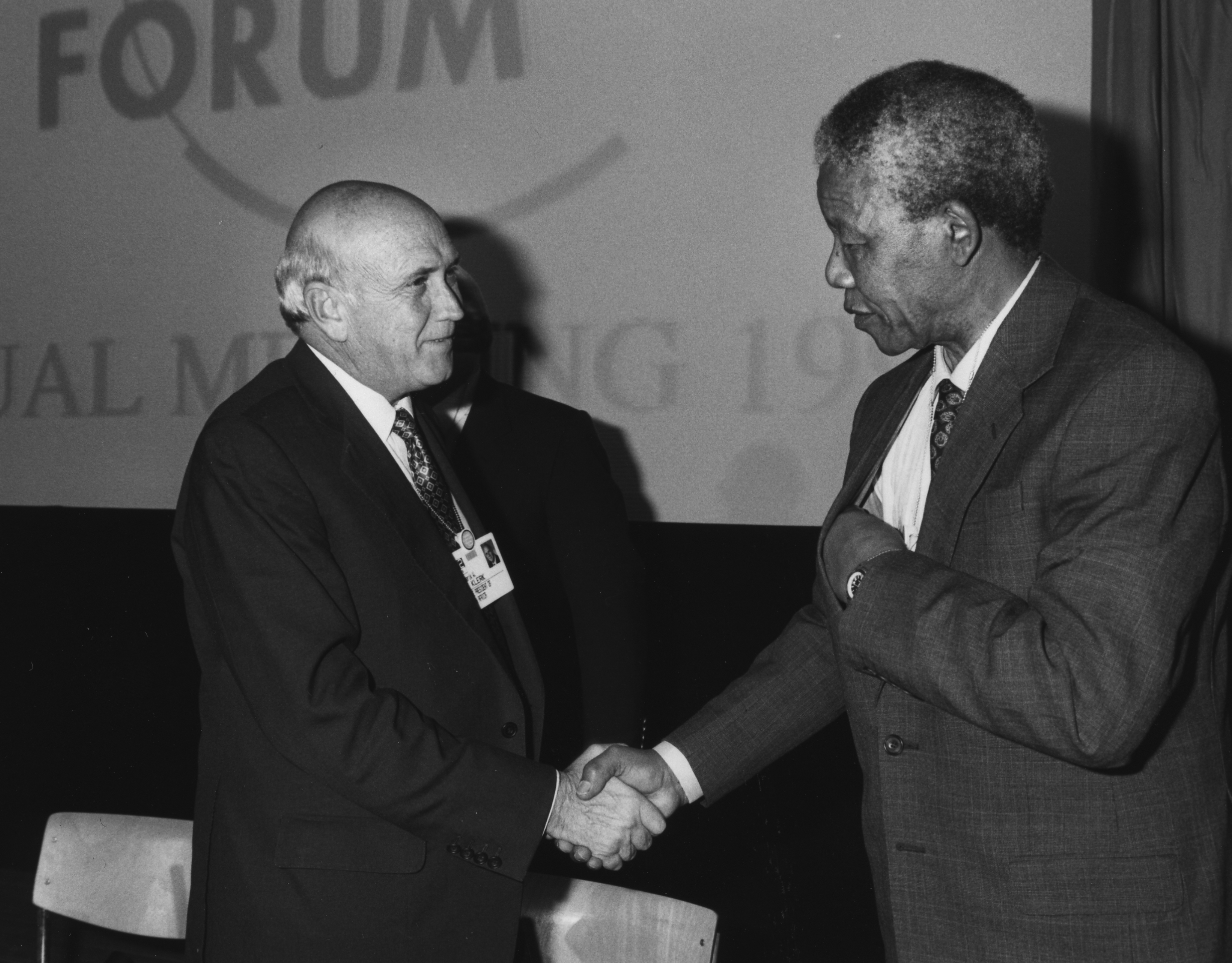
History of South Africa

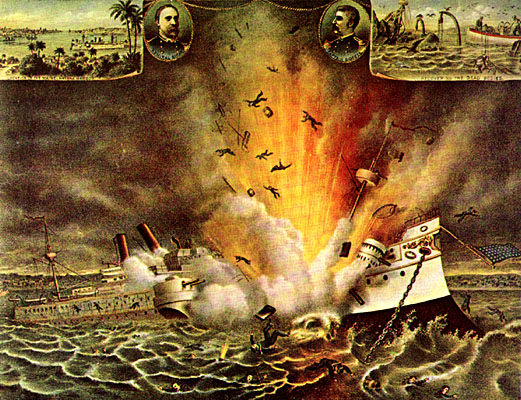
History of Spain

- **History of Saint Kitts and Nevis** – Federation of Saint Christopher and Nevis
- **History of Saint Lucia** – Saint Lucia
- **History of Saint-Pierre and Miquelon** – Saint Pierre and Miquelon (French overseas community)
- **History of Saint Vincent and the Grenadines** – Saint Vincent and the Grenadines
- **History of Samoa** – Independent State of Samoa
- **History of San Marino** – Most Serene Republic of San Marino
- **History of São Tomé and Príncipe** – Democratic Republic of São Tomé and Príncipe
- **History of Saudi Arabia** – Kingdom of Saudi Arabia
- **History of Senegal** – Republic of Senegal
- **History of Serbia** – Republic of Serbia
- **History of Seychelles** – Republic of Seychelles
- **History of Sierra Leone** – Republic of Sierra Leone
- **History of Singapore** – Republic of Singapore
- **History of Slovakia** – Slovak Republic
- **History of Slovenia** – Republic of Slovenia
- **History of Solomon Islands** – Solomon Islands
- **History of Somalia** – Federal Republic of Somalia
- **History of Somaliland** – Republic of Somaliland
- **History of South Africa** – Republic of South Africa
- **History of South Ossetia** – Republic of South Ossetia
- **History of South Sudan** – Republic of South Sudan
- **History of Spain** – Kingdom of Spain
- **History of Sri Lanka** – Democratic Socialist Republic of Sri Lanka
- **History of Sudan** – Republic of the Sudan
- **History of Suriname** – Republic of Suriname
- **History of Svalbard** – Svalbard (Territory of Norway)
- **History of Sweden** – Kingdom of Sweden
- **History of Switzerland** – Swiss Confederation
- **History of Syria** – Syrian Arab Republic

== T ==
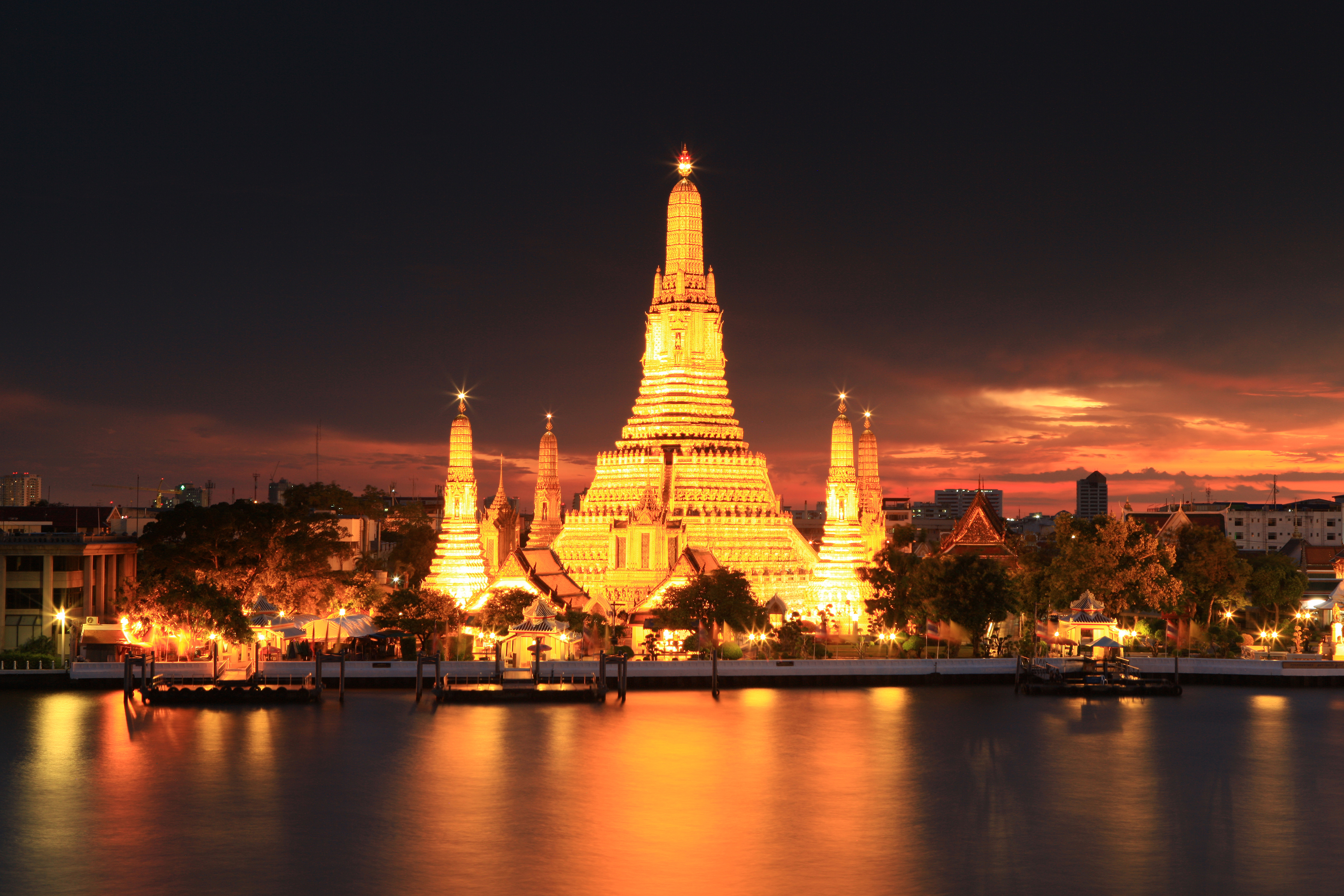
History of Thailand

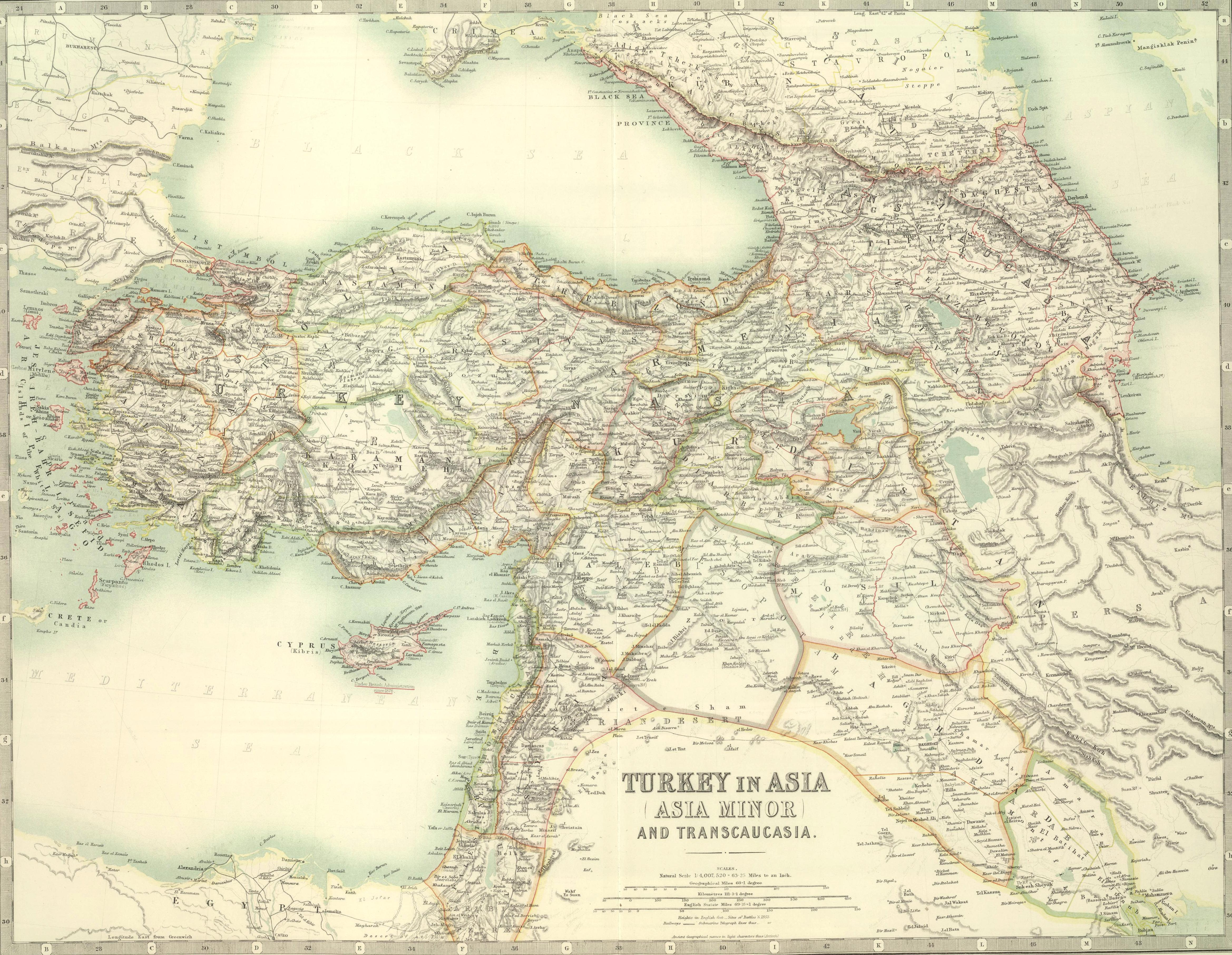
History of Turkey

- **History of Taiwan** – Republic of China
- **History of Tajikistan** – Republic of Tajikistan
- **History of Tanzania** – United Republic of Tanzania
- **History of Thailand** – Kingdom of Thailand
- **History of Timor-Leste (East Timor)** – Democratic Republic of Timor-Leste
- **History of Togo** – Togolese Republic
- **History of Tokelau** – Tokelau (Territory of New Zealand)
- **History of Tonga** – Kingdom of Tonga
- **History of Transnistria** – Pridnestrovian Moldavian Republic
- **History of Trinidad and Tobago** – Republic of Trinidad and Tobago
- **History of Tunisia** – Tunisian Republic
- **History of Turkey** – Republic of Turkey
- **History of Turkmenistan** – Turkmenistan
- **History of the Turks and Caicos Islands** – Turks and Caicos Islands (UK overseas territory)
- **History of Tuvalu** – Tuvalu

== U ==
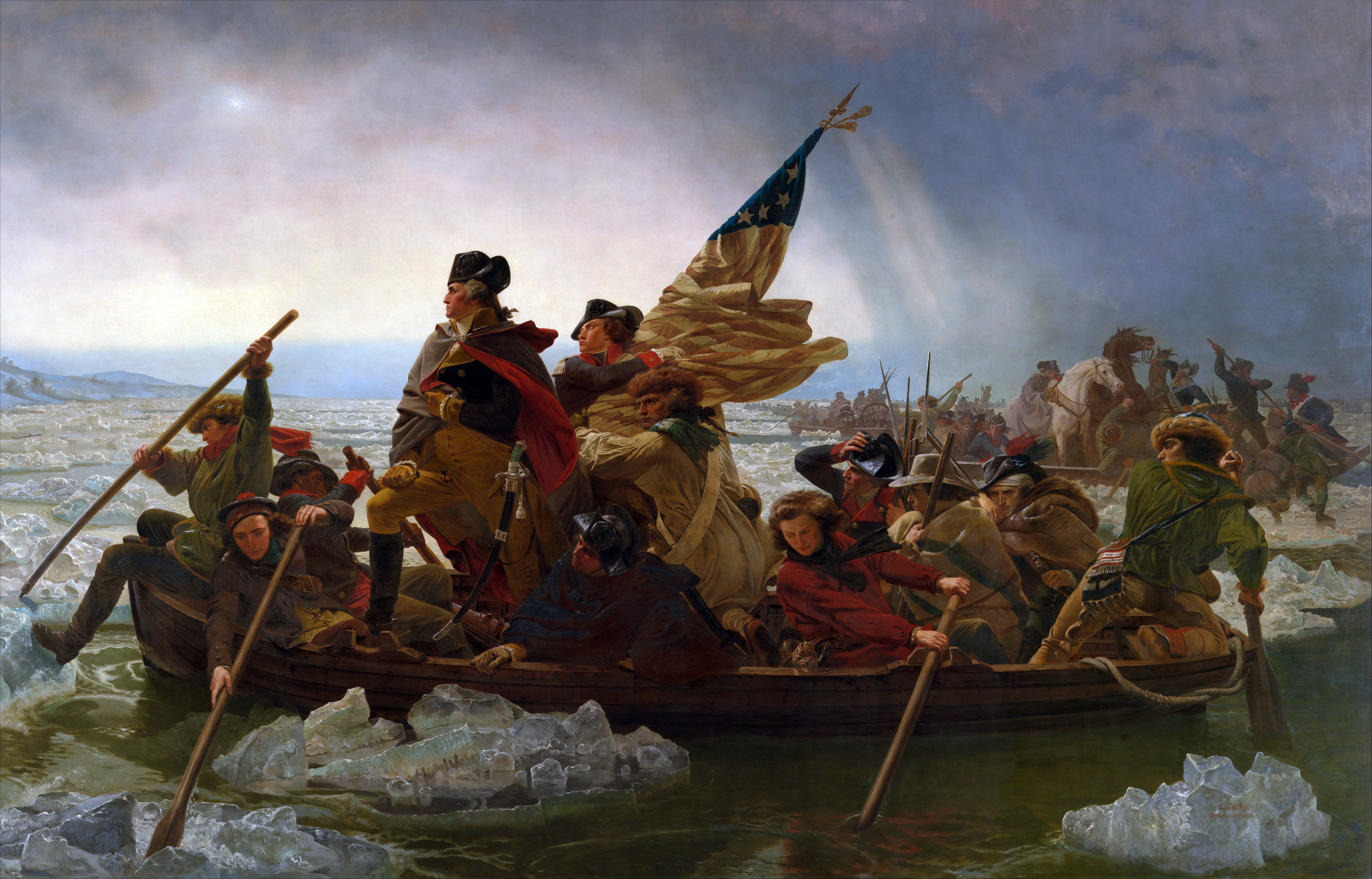
History of the United States

- **History of Uganda** – Republic of Uganda
- **History of Ukraine** – Ukraine
- **History of the United Arab Emirates** – United Arab Emirates
- **History of the United Kingdom** – United Kingdom of Great Britain and Northern Ireland
- **History of the United States** – United States of America
- **History of Uruguay** – Oriental Republic of Uruguay
- **History of Uzbekistan** – Republic of Uzbekistan

== V ==
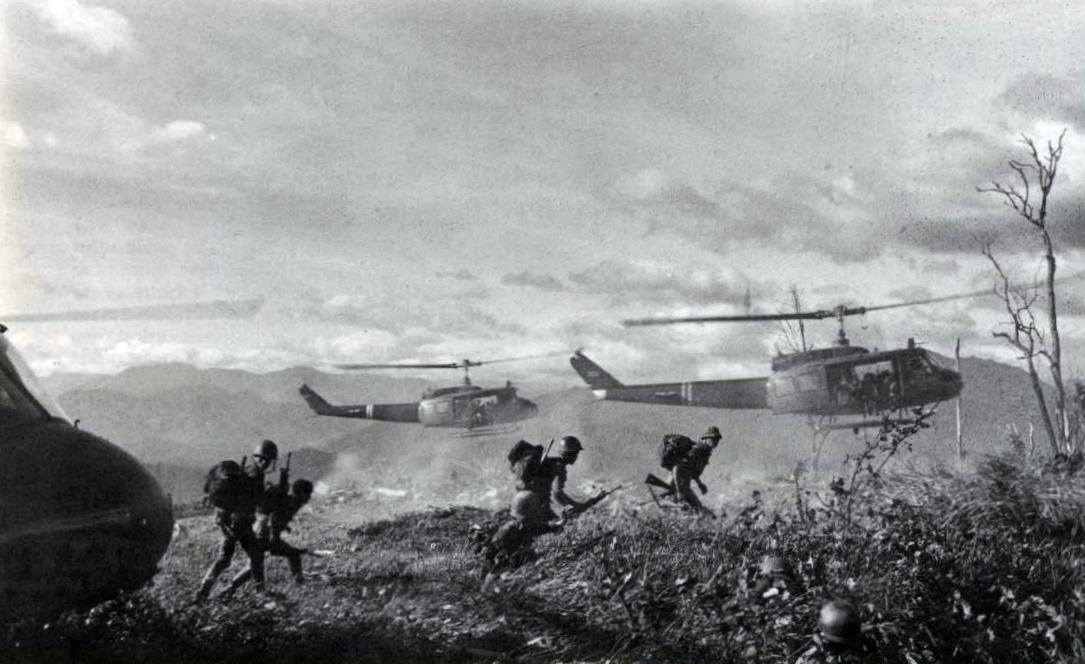
History of Vietnam

- **History of Vanuatu** – Republic of Vanuatu
- **Vatican City**
- **History of Venezuela** – Bolivarian Republic of Venezuela
- **History of Vietnam** – Socialist Republic of Vietnam
- **History of the Virgin Islands** – United States Virgin Islands (US overseas territory)

== W ==
- See History of Palestine for West Bank
- **History of Western Sahara** – Western Sahara

== Y ==
- **History of Yemen** – Republic of Yemen

== Z ==
- **History of Zambia** – Republic of Zambia
- **History of Zimbabwe** – Republic of Zimbabwe

== See also ==
- World history (field)
- Archaeology by country
- Lists by country
- List of countries
