= Savannah, Cayman Islands =

Town in the Cayman Islands

Coordinates: 19°16′22″N 81°17′50″W

- Interactive map of Savannah, Cayman Islands
- Country: Cayman Islands
- Established: 1741
- Time zone: EST

Savannah is a town in the district of Bodden Town, Cayman Islands. With its close proximity to the territory's capital city, George Town, and housing being cheaper than in the capital, many opted to reside there. Savannah is about a 10-minute drive from George Town. The town has one primary school, a post office, and a shopping center with a supermarket. There are also a few restaurants and a café.

Savannah is the location of Pedro St. James Castle, which is the oldest building in the Cayman Islands and is often referred to as the “Birthplace of Democracy” in the islands, as the territory's first legislative body was formed there.
