= Pedro St. James =

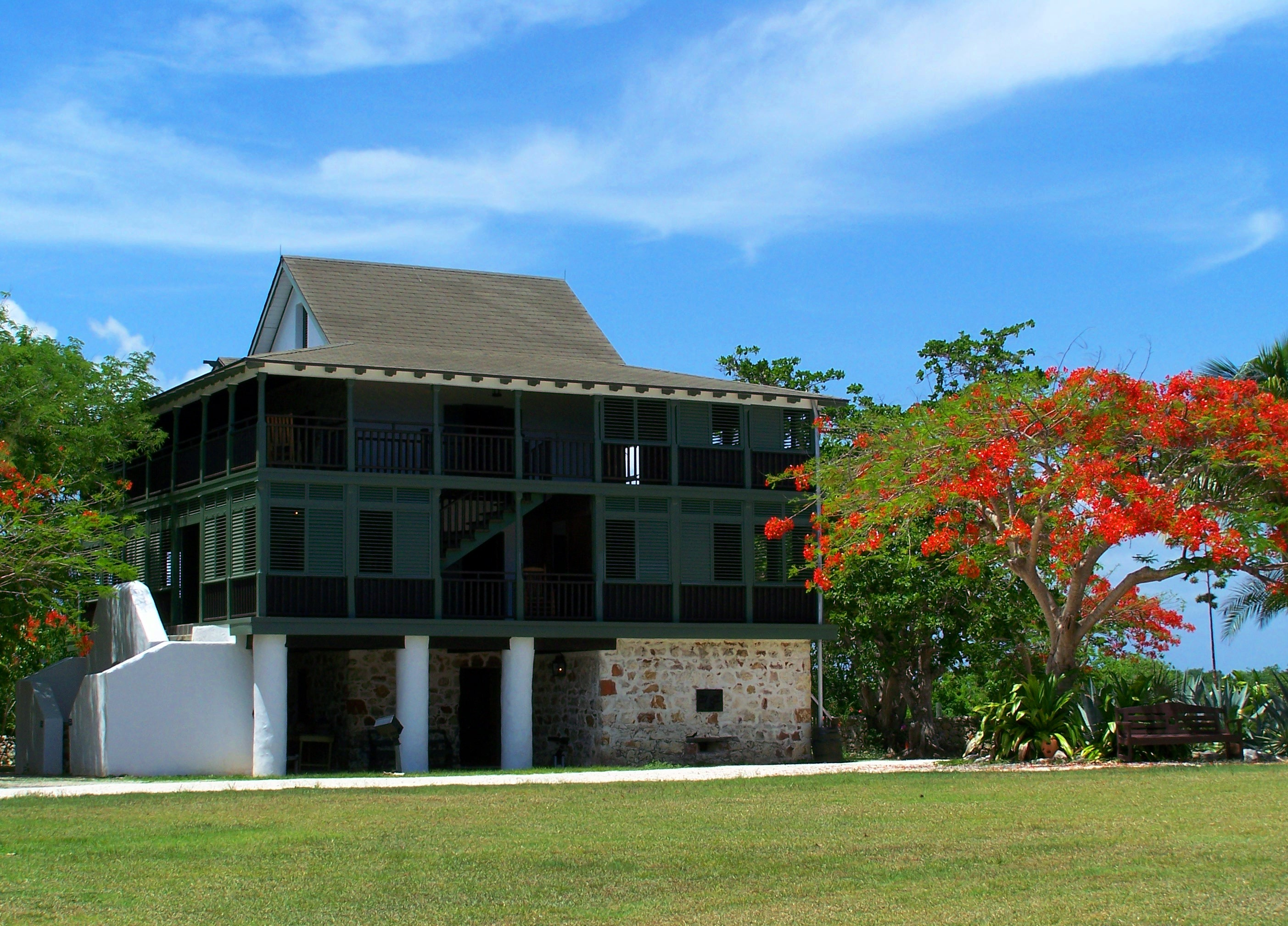
- Pedro St. James Great House after modern restorations

- Location within Cayman Islands
- Alternative names: Pedro's Castle, Birthplace of Democracy
- Etymology: Named for the Pedro district of Grand Cayman

General information
- Status: National Historic Site
- Type: Great House
- Architectural style: Caribbean plantation style
- Location: Savannah; Grand Cayman, Cayman Islands
- Coordinates: 19.2671°N 81.2918°W
- Construction started: 1780
- Completed: 1780
- Renovated: 1991–1998
- Renovation cost: US$8.5 million
- Owner: Government of the Cayman Islands

Height
- Roof: Slate (imported from England)

Technical details
- Material: Coral stone, mahogany
- Floor count: 3
- Grounds: 7 acres

Design and construction
- Architect: Unknown
- Developer: William Eden
- Designations: Cayman Islands National Historic Site
- Known for: Site of the first meeting of the Cayman Islands' elected parliament; proclamation of the abolition of slavery

Renovating team
- Renovating firm: Commonwealth Historic Research Management Limited

Website
- Official Website

Pedro St. James, often referred to locally as Pedro's Castle, is the oldest surviving stone structure and Great House in the Cayman Islands, located on Grand Cayman's southern coast near Savannah.

== History ==
=== Construction (1780) ===
Built in 1780 by Englishman William Eden using enslaved labour, the Great House exemplifies the plantation-style architecture of the era, with coral-rock walls, mahogany verandas, shuttered windows, and a slate roof brought from England.

=== Ownership and uses (19th century) ===
The house passed to James Coe in 1800, who used it for official functions before reverting to Eden in 1822. By 1823–24 it served as a courthouse and jail, and featured cannons for defense against pirates—enhancing its "castle" image.

=== Birthplace of Cayman democracy ===
On 5 December 1831, it hosted the first meeting to form the Cayman Islands' elected parliament, earning the title “Birthplace of Democracy”. On 3 May 1835, the abolition of slavery in the British Empire was announced at the house by government representatives sent from Jamaica.

=== Decline and legends ===
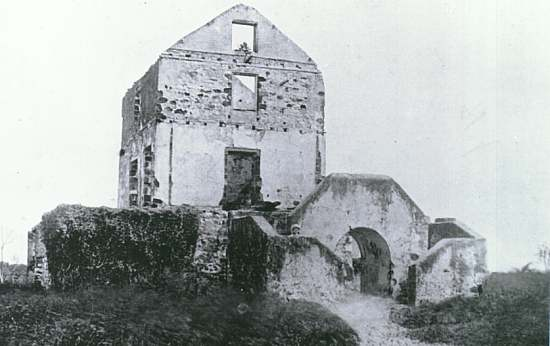
Pedro St. James circa 1910, showing extensive neglect

The house experienced neglect and was widely believed to be haunted after the tragic death of Eden’s granddaughter by lightning in 1877. During the 20th century, the site continued to be privately owned. The building was renovated from a ruinous state by the Hurlston family in 1914, but was abandoned again in 1920. After this, the building was again gradually reduced to ruins. In 1959, the building was purchased by Thomas Hubbell, who renovated the building to look like a castle and lived there until 1963. It was in these modern times that the property became known as "Pedro's Castle". The building was operated as a hotel beginning in 1967 before sustaining a severe fire in 1970. From 1974 until the late 1980s, the house underwent extensive alterations as a tourist attraction and restaurant, before sustaining severe damage both by fire and by Hurricane Gilbert in 1988, leading to the restaurant's closure in 1989.

=== Restoration (1990s) ===
The Cayman Islands government purchased it in 1991 and conducted an extensive restoration to return it to its 18th-century appearance, with work undertaken by the Canadian firm of Commonwealth Historic Research Management Limited. The restoration cost approximately 8 million KYD (8.5 million USD) and reopened in December 1998 as a National Historic Site. In 2004, Pedro St. James and the accompanying visitors centre suffered extensive damage by Hurricane Ivan, causing a closure lasting several months.

== Features and present-day use ==
The redeveloped Pedro St. James has incorporated several additional features, including:

- A multi-sensory 3D theatre presentation that brings early colonial history to life.
- Seven acres of landscaped gardens and panoramic sea views.
- A visitors’ centre, museum exhibits, restaurant/bar (Thatch & Barrel), and rum tastings.
- A venue space for weddings, cultural events, and tours.

== Photo gallery ==
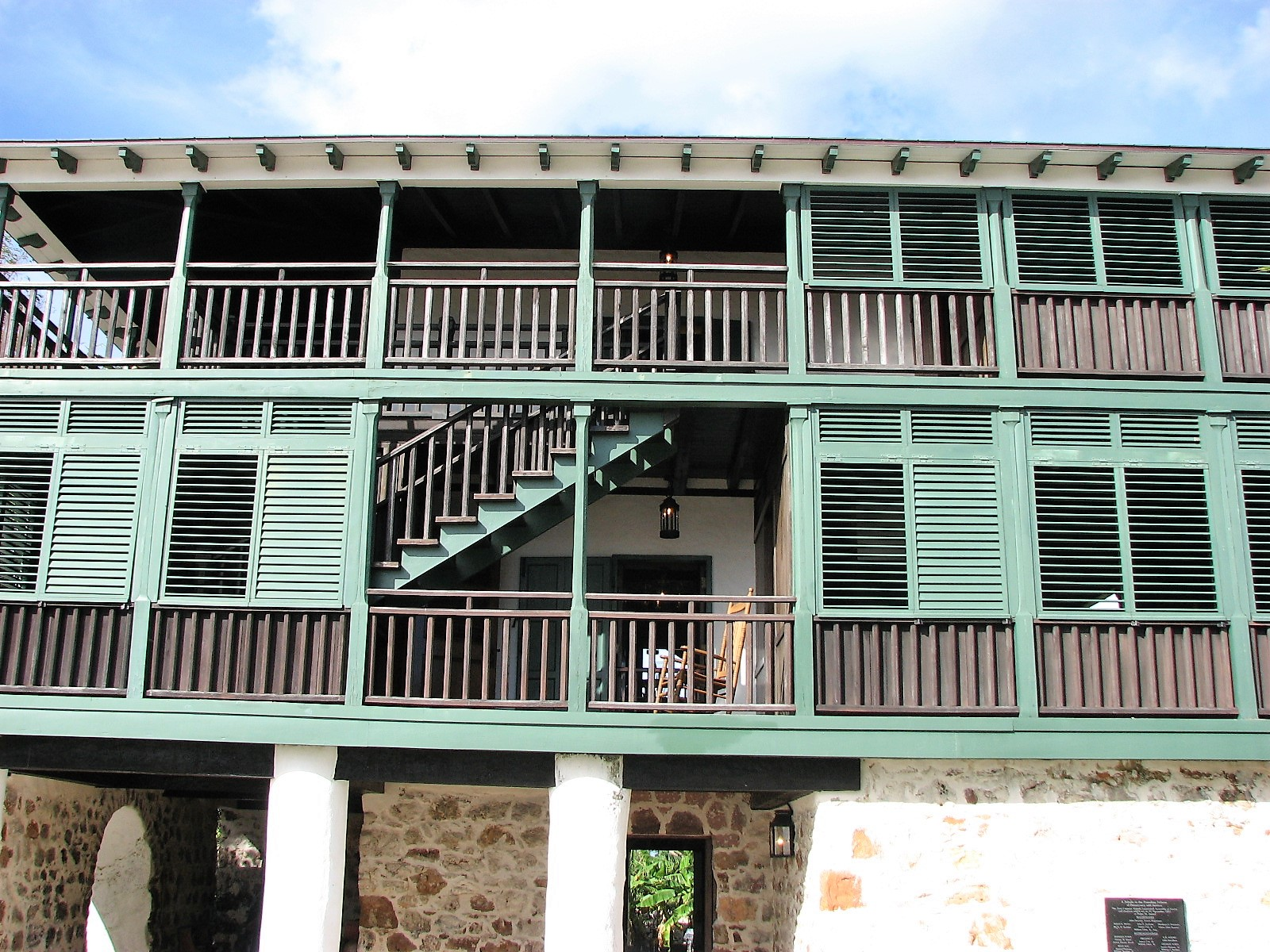
Close-up

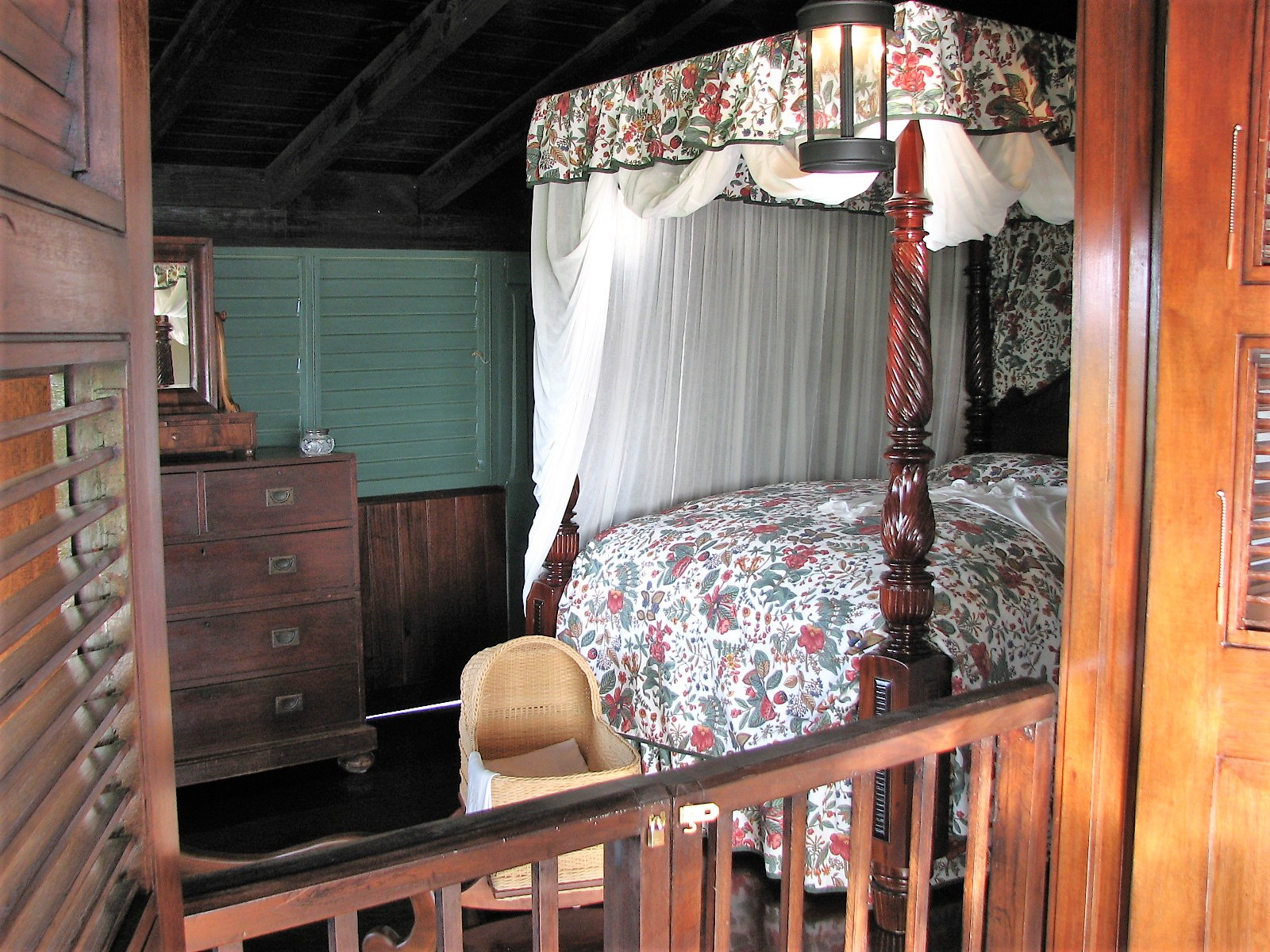
Bedroom - antique mahogany furniture

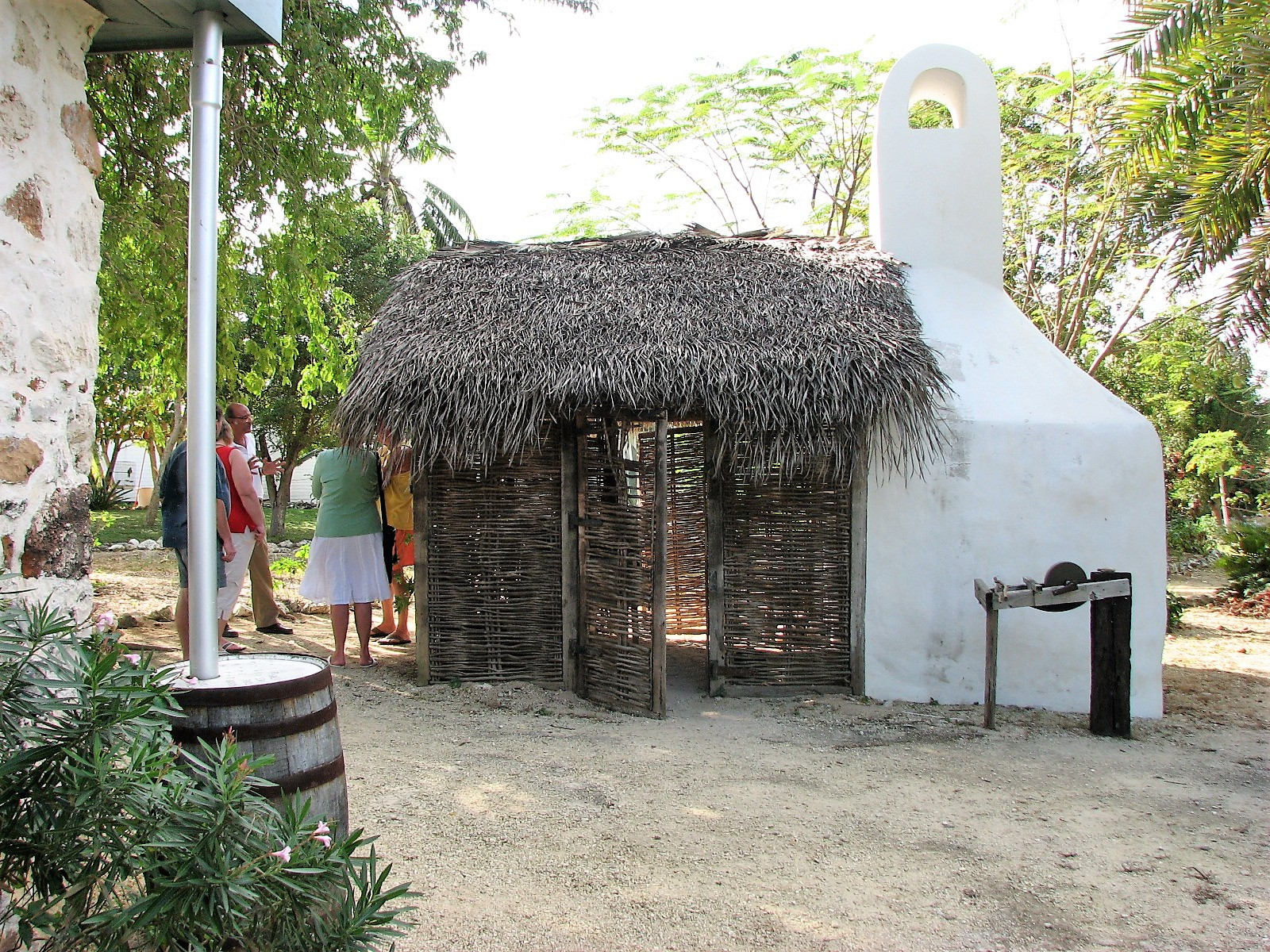
Pedro St. James Cookrum (cook room)

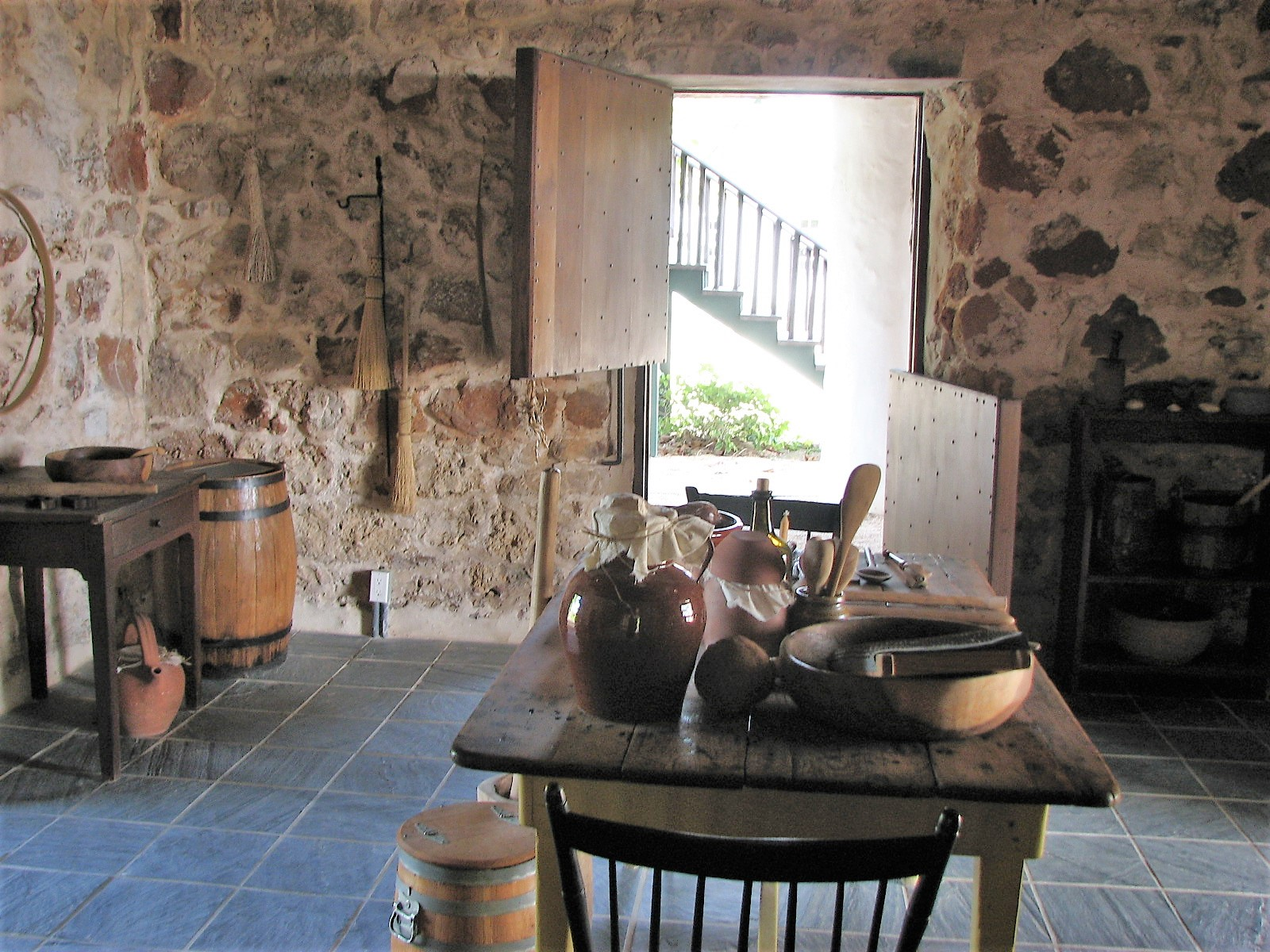
Kitchen interior
