= 2000 Caymanian general election =

General elections were held in the Cayman Islands on 8 November 2000. The elections saw the ruling National Team under Truman Bodden suffer a heavy defeat, with Bodden losing his seat. Following the elections, Kurt Tibbetts of the Democratic Alliance was elected as the Leader of Government Business.

== Campaign ==
Caymananian elections were traditionally contested on a non-partisan basis, with candidates running as independents and or in groupings known as teams. In the August 1991 a grouping known as the Progressive Democratic Party emerged, and constituted the first substantive Cayman political organisation since the 1960s. The party renamed itself as the National Team, and won power in the 1992 elections.

Major issues in the election campaign included the Islands' constitutional status, immigration, housing, and environmental protection.

== Results ==
John McLean, Agriculture Minister, lost his seat to his cousin, Arden McLean.

Party	Votes	%	Seats	+/–
Democratic Alliance and independents			12	–
National Team			3	–6
Total			15	0
Total votes	9,344	–		
Registered voters/turnout	11,604	80.52		
Source: Elections Office

=== By district ===
District	Candidate	Votes	%
Bodden Town	Roy Bodden	1,008	62.96
Bodden Town	Gilbert Allan McLean	788	49.22
Bodden Town	Anthony Eden	759	47.41
Bodden Town	Mary J. Lawrence	658	41.10
Bodden Town	Joseph Ebanks	450	28.11
Bodden Town	Osbourne Bodden	440	27.48
Bodden Town	Heather Dianne Bodden	279	17.43
Bodden Town	Arnold Thomas Berry	232	14.49
Bodden Town	Anthony Scott	185	11.56
Bodden Town	Charles Wesley Watler	135	8.43
Cayman Brac and Little Cayman	Julianna O'Connor-Connolly	590	76.62
Cayman Brac and Little Cayman	Lyndon Leathan Martin	324	42.08
Cayman Brac and Little Cayman	Audley U. Scott	226	29.35
Cayman Brac and Little Cayman	George Eldemire	204	26.49
Cayman Brac and Little Cayman	Maxine Avon Moore-Mccoy	35	4.55
Cayman Brac and Little Cayman	Rupert Kelvin Thompson	30	3.90
East End	Arden McLean	200	37.11
East End	John Bonwell McLean Sr.	175	32.47
East End	Kenross Diaz Conolly	164	30.43
George Town	Kurt Tibbetts	2,753	80.97
George Town	Alden McLaughlin	2,057	60.50
George Town	Frank Swarres McField	1,690	49.71
George Town	Linford Ainsworth Pierson	1,506	44.29
George Town	Lucille Dell Seymour	1,450	42.65
George Town	Truman Murray Bodden	917	26.97
George Town	Berna Thompson Cummins	788	23.18
George Town	Bridget McPartland	554	16.29
George Town	Melba M. Nixon	314	9.24
George Town	A. Steve McField	297	8.74
George Town	Jefford Robert Bodden	114	3.35
George Town	Craig Anthony Brown	78	2.29
George Town	Florence Goring-Nozza	52	1.53
George Town	Rodney Robert Ebanks	36	1.06
North Side	Edna Moyle	249	53.32
North Side	Denison Ezzard Miller	218	46.68
West Bay	McKeeva Bush	1,462	56.95
West Bay	Rolston Anglin	1,030	40.12
West Bay	Eugene Ebanks	929	36.19
West Bay	Cline Glidden	789	30.74
West Bay	Bernie Bush	742	28.91
West Bay	Tara Rivers	671	26.14
West Bay	Thomas Jefferson	539	21.00
West Bay	Leonard Ebanks	533	20.76
West Bay	Sterling Dwayn Ebanks	449	17.49
West Bay	Mario E. Ebanks	354	13.79
West Bay	Mitchell Ebanks	304	11.84
West Bay	Arden B. Parsons	303	11.80
West Bay	Billy Ebanks	300	11.69
West Bay	John Dwight Jefferson	286	11.14
West Bay	Frank Banks	277	10.79
West Bay	James Cyril Parsons Jr.	204	7.95
West Bay	Ina Claire Orr	195	7.60
West Bay	Clarence Bothwell	154	6.00
West Bay	Alice Mae Coe	138	5.38
West Bay	Daphne Ackermon-Orrett	129	5.03
West Bay	Waldo Hilton Parchment	124	4.83
West Bay	Cadian Ebanks	16	0.62

== Aftermath ==
The United Democratic Party (UDP) was formed in November 2001, and would oust Tibbetts as Leader of Government Business that month in a vote of 9 to 5. Tibbett's would be replaced as Leader of Government Business by McKeeva Bush of the UDP. Tibbett's was elected as leader of the new opposition party, the People's Progressive Movement, in May 2002. The party would go on to win the 2005 general election.
