= Kenneth Dart =

Billionaire businessman

Kenneth Bryan Dart
- Born: 1955 (age 70–71); Mason, Michigan, US
- Citizenship: Cayman Islands
- Education: University of Michigan; Cranbrook Kingswood School
- Occupation: Businessperson
- Organization(s): Dart Container; Dart Enterprises; Dart Interests
- Known for: Formerly Michigan's wealthiest person

Kenneth Bryan Dart (born 1955) is a Cayman Islands-based billionaire businessman and investor. His family founded Dart Container, a food and beverage packaging company and is the owner of the Solo Cup Company. Dart owns real estate development and investment companies in the U.S. and Cayman Islands and developed the town of Camana Bay. He maintains a low profile and is known for his focus on privacy.

== Early life and family ==
Kenneth “Ken” Dart was born in 1955 in Mason, Michigan. He was the middle of three sons. In 1976, Dart graduated from the University of Michigan with a degree in mechanical engineering. He then joined the Dart Container Corporation; in 1986 he was named president. In 2001 his brother Robert succeeded him in this role while Kenneth transitioned to the board of directors.

His grandfather, William F. Dart, was an inventor. He founded the Dart Heating and Plumbing Company in 1937. He later founded the Dart Manufacturing Company. The company made metal rulers, military dog tags and a marble game for kids. William F. Dart's wife Ruth Dart had family in Sarasota, FL where the Dart family vacationed and later relocated.

Ken Dart's father, William A. Dart, was William F. and Ruth Dart's only son. He graduated from the University of Michigan with degrees in chemical engineering, metallurgy and mathematics. After serving as a radar technician in the U.S. Navy during World War II, William A. Dart worked for DuPont in New Jersey and met his wife Claire Dart. They moved to Mason, MI in 1951, and William A. Dart joined his father in the family business. In 1960, his family founded Dart Container Corporation, now the world's largest manufacturer of foam cups and containers; by 2006, it had with an estimated $1.1 billion in sales.

William A. Dart and Claire Dart founded the Dart Foundation in 1984. The family foundation has made more than $100 million in donations to organizations focused on community and health services as well as STEM education.

In 1986, Dart's father divided the Dart holdings among trusts set up for his three sons. The eldest son, Tom, received Dart Enhergy; the cup business went to Ken and Robert, the youngest son. In 1986, Ken moved to Sarasota, Florida.

In the mid-1990s Ken renounced his American citizenship and took Caymanian, Belizean and, later, Irish citizenship. Ken moved his residence to the Cayman Islands and in 1994 converted what was the beachfront West Indian club into his home. Ken Dart has three daughters.

In 1994 Dart offered his residence in Sarasota, Florida, to the government of Belize as a consulate with himself as its consul. This would have allowed him to live in the United States full-time as a foreign diplomat, avoiding any actions by the Internal Revenue Service; the State Department rejected the arrangement.

== Businesses ==
Dart is an entrepreneur and investor involved in various industries including real estate and finance. In 2025, Dart received the inaugural Ownership Group of the Year by Forbes Travel Guide and CBRE for its ongoing commitment to excellence over its 20-year history.

=== Dart Enterprises ===
Dart Enterprises is a group of companies that holds Cayman Islands real estate and operates businesses.

=== Dart Interests ===
Dart Interests is Dart's Dallas-based national real estate and development firm in the U.S. The company has projects in multiple states and includes multifamily, hospitality and resort, mixed-use and for-sale condominiums.

=== Dart Real estate ===
==== Cayman Islands ====
In 1995, Dart purchased the Coral Caymanian Hotel and its 236 acres of land, which was developed into the town of Camana Bay. Planning for Camana Bay began in 1996, ground was broken in 2005, Cayman International School opened in 2006, and the first businesses opened in 2007. Camana Bay's master plan includes many phases that will take multiple decades to complete on the 685-acre site close to Seven Mile Beach.

Camana Bay includes retail and commercial space including a cinema, restaurants, a supermarket, a bookstore, banks, and two schools. Residential at Camana Bay includes rentals and for sale units.

As of 2024, Dart was believed to be the largest landowner in the Cayman Islands. Other Dart properties include:

- The Ritz-Carlton, Grand Cayman
- The Kimpton Seafire Resort and Spa
- Palm Heights
- The Cayman Islands Yacht Club
- Regatta Office Park
- Flagship Building
- Hampton by Hilton
- Hotel Indigo
- Island Plaza
- Le Soleil d’Or
- Paradise Villas

==== Anguilla ====
Dart expanded holdings in the Caribbean 2022 with the purchase of the Four Seasons Resort and Residences in Anguilla. As part of a partnership agreement with the government, Dart funded construction of a new Landsome Bowl Cultural Center. Dart acquired Zemi Beach House in 2024.

==== United States ====
Dart Interests developed Evermore Orlando Resort, located next to Walt Disney World, which covers more than 1,100 acres with a 20-acre beach complex and an 8-acre pool called Evermore Bay. Evermore is a new resort category with wholly owned, vacation rental homes that have resort amenities. The $1.5 billion resort opened on January 1, 2024. The 433-key Conrad Orlando is located in Evermore.

In 2023, Dart Interests purchased the Fort Worth Central Library. The city selected Dart Interests from three bidders. The development will include space for a new library. In 2024, Dart Interests acquired the 4.6-acre site next to the library property. The firm also purchased a four-story office building in the area.

In 2018, Dart Interests joined Lowe Enterprises as an investment partner in the Wild Dunes Resort, located in South Carolina. The resort underwent a $150 million renovation, culminating in the opening of the Sweetgrass Inn in 2021.

The New York Times has described Dart as an investor in New York financial district skyscrapers 161 Water Street (formerly addressed as 175 Water Street) and 180 Maiden Lane (also known as the Continental Center).

=== Dart Neuroscience ===
Dart founded Dart Neuroscience in 2008 to pursue scientific research and technologies to develop therapies that could enhance human memory and cognitive abilities. The company created the Extreme Memory Tournament (XMT), in which 16 global memory athletes competed in recall contests; one winner recited 80 random numbers after studying them for 21.01 seconds. Dart invested over $700 million in Dart Neuroscience before closing the business in 2017, citing a lack of progress in memory improvement.

== Investments ==
Dart is known for investments in sovereign debt, concentrated and often contrarian equity positions, and campaigns for minority shareholder rights in emerging economies.

=== Early investments ===
After the Dart Family Trust was restructured in 1986, Dart deployed the available capital into investments through Dart Financial Corporation.

- Freddie Mac: In 1991, Ken Dart invested $300 million in the Federal Home Loan Mortgage Corporation “Freddie Mac”, a 10.8% stake. He also invested in mortgage-backed securities issued by the Federal National Mortgage Association (Fannie Mae). A few years later, he realized a return of more than 300%.
- Salomon Inc.: In October 1991, Ken Dart purchased a 5.74% stake in Salomon Inc, parent company of Salomon Brothers, making Dart the second largest shareholder.

=== Sovereign debt ===
Dart has purchased the debt of numerous countries and participated in debt reconstruction. These include Ecuador, Ivory Coast, Mexico, Nigeria, Peru, Poland, Russia, Ukraine, and Venezuela. These investments did not entail disputes or result in legal action.

==== Brazil ====
Dart began buying Brazilian debt in the 1990s. In 1991 and 1992, Dart was the fourth-largest debt holder of private debt during the final stages of a restructuring packages. Dart's high-risk approach drew attention when Dart signed on the proposed restricting package and selected an option based on uncollateralized bonds instead of U.S. Treasury-back low-interest bonds selected by other creditors. When Brazil amended its proposal to shift 35% of Dart's position into the discount bonds, Dart opposed the revised terms. The dispute was settled, and the restructuring closed, after Brazil agreed to pay a portion of Dart's overdue interest.

==== Greece ====
During the Greek financial crisis, Dart was part of a group of investors that held more than $8.2 billion in bonds and did not participate in a proposed exchange in 2012. Greek officials chose to repay Dart and other creditors in full for a total of €436 million, citing the country's lack of a government following inconclusive elections. Dart received almost 90% of the initial payout.

==== Argentina ====
Argentina entered a deep recession in 1998 and in late 2001 defaulted nearly $100 billion in debt represented by more than 150 types of bonds. Citing unsuccessful attempts to begin negotiation discussion with Argentina's representatives which refused to negotiate for four years, Dart company EM Ltd. filed suit in the Southern District Court of New York in 2003 and was awarded a $700 million judgment for defaulted bonds a week before Argentine bondholders rejected a 25% redemption offer. The Argentine debt restructuring was one of the longest sovereign debt restructuring processes in history followed with EM Ltd. rejecting restructuring proposals in 2005 and 2010. EM attempted to enforce judgements it received in the U.S. courts during that period. In 2013 creditors including EM Ltd. won a decision from the United States Court of Appeals for the Second Circuit in New York that rejected a repayment plan from Argentina, called for repayment to all bondholders and referred to the country as a “uniquely recalcitrant debtor”. The US Supreme Court rejected Argentina's appeals in June 2014. EM accepted an offer Argentina made to six bondholders on February 1, 2016.

=== Other investments ===
==== Russia ====
In 1991, following the collapse of the Soviet Union, Dart was one of the first investors in the independent Russian state. Along with private investments into various sectors, Dart and his firm bought Russian bonds. During the late 90s when Russian stock scandals were dissuading foreign investors, Dart's companies led a group of private investors in a campaign for transparent corporate governance and the rights of minority shareholders. Yukos, the country's second biggest oil company, used stock issues to attempt to skirt creditors and minority shareholders in its subsidiaries.

==== Equity investments ====
Dart owns a 5.9% stake in Imperial Brands, and 7.9% in British American Tobacco. The original investment was disclosed in 2020. By the end of 2024, returns exceeded £3 billion through share buybacks and dividends. Dart's investments reflect his belief in the tobacco sector's resilience.

In 2024, Dart became a shareholder in Swedish online casino developer Evolution AB. In 2025, he became the largest shareholder and increased his exposure to 25.44% through a swap agreement. In September 2025, Dart invested in a 5% stake in sports betting company Flutter Entertainment. Additional investments in October 2025 and January 2026 expanded his exposure to 15%.

== Community involvement ==
=== Kenneth B. Dart Foundation ===
Ken Dart established the Kenneth B. Dart Foundation in 2015 to provide economic support for community projects. These include funding the R3 Cayman Foundation, an expansion of Cayman International School and a three-year partnership with the Jr. NBA for youth sports development.

=== Dart Foundation ===
Ken Dart is vice president of the Dart Foundation. The Foundation is based in Lansing, Michigan and supports causes that foster change at the local level.

In 2025, the Dart Foundation donated $1.25 million to the Michigan State University Federal Credit Union (MSUFCU) Ovation performing arts center located in Lansing, Michigan. This contribution is part of the $28 million development project and will fund the venue's audio and lighting equipment.

The Foundation also made a $500,000 donation to the Boys & Girls Club of Lansing, funding the creation of the Dart Foundation Cafe. This new commercial kitchen provides the club with space and modern equipment to prepare nutritious meals for the children it serves daily.

=== Dart Center for Journalism and Trauma ===
Between 1991 and 2025, through the Dart Foundation and Kenneth B. Dart Foundation, Ken Dart and the Dart Family provided continuous funding for the Dart Center for Journalism and Trauma, the only academic institution devoted to trauma-informed journalism, linking news professionals, scientific researchers, clinicians and victim advocates worldwide. From 1999 to 2009 the Dart Center was based at the University of Washington, and between 2009 and 2025 was a project of Columbia University's Graduate School of Journalism in New York.

=== Cayman International School ===
Cayman International School (CIS) is a private school in Camana Bay for students from nursery through Grade 12. It is independently operated by International School Services. Its original buildings were provided by the William and Claire Dart Foundation. The Kenneth B. Dart Foundation funded a $60 million expansion of CIS that added a new high school in 2021.

=== Dart Scholar ===
Dart Scholar is a STEM-focused scholarship program for Caymanian high school and university students. The William A. Dart Memorial University Scholarship is named after Ken Dart's father. Scholars receive a four-year scholarship to the school of their choice and regular mentoring and work experience at Dart Enterprises. Since inception, there have been 40 Dart Scholars.

=== Minds Inspired ===
Minds Inspired is an education program with an emphasis on STEM. It includes a Math Challenge, a Sustainable Development Goals Challenge, programming skills an interschool robotics initiative and the Cayman Islands National Robotics Team that competes in the FIRST Global Challenge. Every year Minds Inspired offers a summer work experience program, Work-X, to give students experience in fields that include finance, marketing, business innovations, human resources, and IT.

=== R3 Cayman Foundation ===
Ken Dart established the R3 Cayman Foundation to help support recovery after the coronavirus pandemic. It was started with a CI$1 million grant from the Kenneth B. Dart Foundation. The Kenneth B. Dart Foundation has contributed a total of CI $6.5 million in donations and matching contributions. Since its inception in 2020, the R3 Cayman Foundation has contributed more than US$7.7 million to Cayman non-profit organisations and governmental agencies.

In September 2024, the R3 Cayman Foundation made a US$328,663 contribution to support the Royal Cayman Islands Police Service and Cayman Islands Customs and Border Control. The funding will be used to modernize police helicopter radar technology with AI and upgrade cargo scanners at key ports, enhancing search and rescue operations and security measures.
