= 1992 Caymanian general election =

- 19 November 1992
- 15 seats in the Legislative Assembly; 8 seats needed for a majority
Party	Leader	Seats	+/–
National Team	Thomas Jefferson	12	New
Independents		3	−2
This lists parties that won seats. See the complete results below.
Leader of Government Business before	Leader of Government Business after
Thomas Jefferson; Independent	Thomas Jefferson; Independent

General elections were held in the Cayman Islands on 19 November 1992. The result was a victory for the National Team, which won 12 of the 15 seats in the Legislative Assembly.

== Results ==
Three of the four members of the Executive Council stood for re-election (the other retired from politics prior to the elections), but all three lost their seats.

Party	Votes	%	Seats	+/–
National Team			12	New
Independents			3	–2
Total			15	+3
Valid votes	8,873	99.65		
Invalid/blank votes	31	0.35		
Total votes	8,904	100.00		
Registered voters/turnout	10,196	87.33		
Source: Elections Office

=== By district ===
District	Candidate	Votes	%
Bodden Town	Roy Bodden	1,234	87.89
Bodden Town	Anthony Ebanks	1,089	77.56
Bodden Town	Haig Bodden	981	69.87
Bodden Town	Mary J. Lawrence	338	24.07
Bodden Town	George Robert Ebanks	304	21.65
Cayman Brac and Little Cayman	Marby S. Kirkconnell	415	59.03
Cayman Brac and Little Cayman	Gilbert Allan McLean	325	46.23
Cayman Brac and Little Cayman	Julianna O'Connor-Connolly	206	29.30
Cayman Brac and Little Cayman	Keith Parker Tibbetts Jr.	154	21.91
Cayman Brac and Little Cayman	Herbie Martín	148	21.05
East End	John Bonwell McLean Sr.	395	77.00
East End	Arden McLean	100	19.49
East End	Blafour Christian	16	3.12
East End	Carlyle B. McLaughlin Sr.	3	0.58
George Town	Truman M. Bodden	2,211	64.22
George Town	Steve Tomlinson	2,127	61.78
George Town	Berna Thompson Murphy	2,116	61.46
George Town	Kurt Tibbetts	1,488	43.22
George Town	Adrien Bodden Briggs	1,182	34.33
George Town	Linford Ainsworth Pierson	1,041	30.24
George Town	Brian Francis Wight	682	19.81
George Town	John Edlin Hurlstone	578	16.79
George Town	Eldon Rankin	454	13.19
George Town	Rudi D. Evans	374	10.86
George Town	Renard Moxam	224	6.51
George Town	Derrick Ebanks	174	5.05
George Town	Robert Bodden	165	4.79
George Town	James Manoah Bodden	118	3.43
George Town	George Smith	87	2.53
North Side	Edna Moyle	266	58.21
North Side	Ezzard Miller	187	40.92
North Side	Franklin Roosevelt Smith	4	0.88
West Bay	McKeeva Bush	1,954	83.04
West Bay	Thomas Jefferson	1,802	76.58
West Bay	John Dwight Jefferson	1,775	75.44
West Bay	Dalmain Dunstan Ebanks	1,626	69.10
West Bay	Benson Obadiah Ebanks	613	26.05
West Bay	Alice Mae Coe	435	18.49
West Bay	Daphne Louise Orrett	392	16.66
West Bay	John Garston Smith	267	11.35
West Bay	Carlyle Ebanks	165	7.01
West Bay	Waldo Hilton Parchment	135	5.74
West Bay	Burns Rankine	69	2.93
West Bay	Cadian Andhal Ebanks	36	1.53
