= Kurt Tibbetts =

Caymanian politician (born 1954)

The Honourable Kurt Tibbetts OBE

Leader of Government Business
- In office 18 May 2005 – 27 May 2009
- Monarch: Elizabeth II
- Governor: Bruce Dinwiddy; Stuart Jack
- Preceded by: McKeeva Bush
- Succeeded by: McKeeva Bush
- In office 15 November 2000 – 8 November 2001
- Monarch: Elizabeth II
- Governor: Peter Smith
- Preceded by: Truman Bodden
- Succeeded by: McKeeva Bush

Leader of the Opposition
- In office 27 May 2009 – 21 February 2011
- Monarch: Elizabeth II
- Governor: Stuart Jack; Duncan Taylor
- Preceded by: McKeeva Bush
- Succeeded by: Alden McLaughlin
- In office 8 November 2001 – 18 May 2005
- Monarch: Elizabeth II
- Governor: Peter Smith; Bruce Dinwiddy
- Succeeded by: McKeeva Bush

Leader of the People's Progressive Movement
- In office 31 August 2002 – 12 February 2011
- Succeeded by: Alden McLaughlin

Member of the Legislative Assembly of the Cayman Islands
- In office November 1992 – 24 May 2017
- Constituency: George Town

Personal details
- Born: 2 March 1954 (age 72)
- Party: People's Progressive Movement
- Spouse: Shirley Ann Tibbetts
- Children: 3

Darwin Kurt Tibbetts, OBE (born 2 March 1954) is a Caymanian politician and former Leader of Government Business in the Cayman Islands. Tibbetts served as leader of the People's Progressive Movement party from August 2002 – February 2011. Tibbetts served as an elected member for the district of George Town, serving six terms in the Legislative Assembly of the Cayman Islands.

== Early life ==
Tibbetts was born in Jamaica for medical reasons. After his birth, he returned to the family home in Cayman Brac until he was sent away to Jamaica for schooling at age 7, where he attended St. George's College, Jamaica. At age of 19, he moved to Grand Cayman and worked in the CIBC for one year. After this, he worked in a print shop for four years and then started his own printing business, which he had owned and managed for over twenty five years. The Tibbetts family originated in Cayman Brac and even though Tibbetts has spent much of his life in Grand Cayman, he also identifies strongly with the Sister Islands.

== Participation in the community ==
In 1976, at just 22 years of age, he joined the Lions Club of Grand Cayman, serving as President in 1988, 1993 and 1994. His acumen for fund raising helped the club collect hundreds of thousands of dollars that were ploughed back into the community, mostly to augment government welfare programmes. During his tenure as President for the 1993–94 year was the launching of the Big Brothers, Big Sisters movement. He also helped introduce the Lions’ Benzarama fundraisers that brought country music legends Johnny Cash, Charlie Pride, Tanya Tucker, Ronnie Milsap, Don Williams and Ben E. King to the Cayman Islands. Tibbetts gratefully acknowledges the influence his Lions Club seniors had on him and emphasises that he is only one among many like-minded members. He values all the club's accomplishments and particularly the fellowship of its membership. Notably, it was the satisfaction Tibbetts gained from serving others that led to his decision to enter the political arena.

== Political career ==
In 1988 he ran against other George Town politicians and came in fourth behind Truman Bodden at the time there were only three George Town representatives and he was not elected. It was Tibbetts' love for public service that first attracted him to politics. Concerned about constitutional matters and the welfare of the people, he decided to run as a candidate for the district of George Town in 1992. He won the seat with a large majority and has ably and endearingly represented the people of George Town and the Cayman Islands ever since. In 1992, following the creation of a fourth George Town seat, Tibbetts was elected fourth to the Legislative Assembly for the district of George Town.

In November 1996 Tibbetts was elected first to the Legislative Assembly for the district of George Town and has continuously since. Tibbetts has also served on several Government Boards. He was appointed a Justice of the Peace in 1998. During his first two terms in the Legislative Assembly Tibbetts proved to be a good constituency representative, a team player and an effective leader. It was therefore no surprise when he was elected to be the Leader of Government Business in November 2000. From November 2000 to November 2001 he served as the Leader of Government Business, as well as serving on Executive Councils (renamed Cabinet in 2003) as Minister for Planning, Communications and Works.

On November 8, 2001 legislators led by McKeeva Bush voted to oust Tibbetts as Leader of Government Business saying he has not done enough to counter a slowing economy. Nine of the 15 elected legislators voted to remove Tibbetts as Leader of Government Business. Five voted against the motion, and one (Tibbetts) abstained. The vote came after 10 of the 15 elected legislators formed a new party that same day, The legislators, who had been independents, formed the new United Democratic Party, with Mckeeva Bush as their leader. As part of the changes to the Assembly's Executive Council, legislators also removed Tibbetts supporter Edna Moyle as minister of community development and women's affairs. Tibbetts said during debate on the motion that he had no choice but to accept the result of the vote, but said the islands should restructure the system so that the leadership cannot be so easily removed.

From November 2001 until May 2005, Tibbetts served as the Leader of the Opposition. Following the political challenges of 2001, Mr. Tibbetts proved himself to be a statesman by devoting his talents to the task of political modernization of the Cayman Islands. First he assembled an able team and together they systematically went about creating a modern political organization based on widespread consultation and political education. Politics came of age in 2003 when the People's Progressive Movement (PPM) was inaugurated with Tibbetts as Leader of the PPM and Leader of Her Majesty's Opposition. For the first time in caymanian history, the election of May 2005 was keenly contested between two major parties, the PPM and the United Democratic Party.

Following the People's Progressive Movement success in the Cayman Islands general election 2005, Tibbetts returned to serve as the Leader of Government Business and Minister for District Administration, Planning, Agriculture and Housing during the People's Progressive Movement administration from May 2005 to May 2009. Over the past years Tibbetts has openly advocated participatory democracy, governmental transparency, and governmental accountability. Tibbetts' major political accomplishments include the freedom of Information act, which for the first time in the caymanian history grants residents virtually unfettered access to the inner workings of government, the 2009 Cayman Islands Constitution, infrastructure and capital projects that he has been instrumental in creating, such as the construction of the Esterley Tibbetts Highway, The East-West Arterial and the New Government Administration Building. For two terms as an Opposition Member, he consolidated his understanding of the importance of medium- and long-term planning for the Islands, as well as the need for constitutional modernization to strengthen Cayman's democracy. Among his other accomplishments, he spearheaded the passage of the Constitution of the Cayman Islands.

Tibbetts returned to opposition following the Cayman Islands general election, 2009. On 10 November 2010 Tibbetts announced that he would be stepping down as Leader of the Opposition and Leader of the People's Progressive Movement opposition front bench and on 12 February 2011, the People's Progressive Movement made history when it became the first political party in the Cayman Islands to transfer leadership. Tibbetts stepped down as Leader of the Opposition and Leader of the People's Progressive Movement and was replaced by Alden McLaughlin. In June 2010 Her Majesty Queen Elizabeth II bestowed the designation Order of the British Empire OBE for his service to the Islands.

Once again following the People's Progressive Movement success in the 2013 general elections, with the majority the progressives formed a new government. Tibbetts, was returned as first elected member for the district of George Town for the fifth consecutive time. Premier Alden McLaughlin appointed Tibbetts to serve in cabinet as Minister responsible for Planning, Lands, Agriculture, Housing and Infrastructure in the 2013 - 2017 People's Progressive Movement Administration.

In March 2017 Tibbetts announced that after six terms and 25 years in office he would not seek re-election and his retirement from politics in the Legislative Assembly of the Cayman Islands prior to the 2017 general elections.

== Family and personal life ==
He married Shirley-Ann Tibbetts in 1984 and they have three children: daughters Jacynth and Janelle, and son Jared.

Tibbetts was appointed Officer of the Order of the British Empire (OBE) in the 2010 Queen Elizabeth II Birthday Honours for his contributions to politics, his success in business and his community service. Tibbetts also serves as a justice of the peace.

Preceded by Truman Bodden	Leader of Government Business; November 2000 – November 2001	Succeeded by McKeeva Bush
Preceded by McKeeva Bush	Leader of Government Business; May 2005 – May 2009	Succeeded by McKeeva Bush
