= 2005 Caymanian general election =

← 2000	11 May 2005	2009 →
- 15 seats in the Legislative Assembly; 8 seats needed for a majority
Party	Leader	Vote %	Seats	+/–
PPM	Kurt Tibbetts	39.51	9	New
UDP	McKeeva Bush	34.39	5	New
Independent		9.40	1	
This lists parties that won seats. See the complete results below.
Leader of Government Business before	Leader of Government Business after
McKeeva Bush; UDP	Kurt Tibbetts; PPM

General elections were held in the Cayman Islands on 11 May 2005.

They were won by the People's Progressive Movement, which took 10 of the 15 seats in the Legislative Assembly. Following the elections, Kurt Tibbetts was re-elected as the Leader of Government Business.

== Results ==
Party	Votes	%	Seats	+/–
People's Progressive Movement	13,199	39.51	9	New
United Democratic Party	11,487	34.39	5	New
West Bay Alliance	3,449	10.32	0	New
People's Democratic Alliance	2,133	6.38	0	New
Independents	3,139	9.40	1	–
Total	33,407	100.00	15	0
Total votes	10,330	–		
Registered voters/turnout	13,118	78.75		
Source: Elections Office

=== By district ===
District	Candidate	Party	Votes	%
Bodden Town	Anthony Eden	People's Progressive Movement	1,623	73.17
Bodden Town	Charles Clifford	People's Progressive Movement	1,186	53.47
Bodden Town	Osbourne Bodden	People's Progressive Movement	1,140	51.40
Bodden Town	Mark Scotland	United Democratic Party	908	40.94
Bodden Town	Roy Bodden	United Democratic Party	721	32.51
Bodden Town	Gilbert McLean	United Democratic Party	557	25.11
Bodden Town	Mary J. Lawrence	Independent	221	9.96
Bodden Town	Sandra Catron	Independent	131	5.91
Cayman Brac and Little Cayman	Julianna O'Connor-Connolly	United Democratic Party	423	55.73
Cayman Brac and Little Cayman	Moses Ian Kirkconnell	Independent	380	50.07
Cayman Brac and Little Cayman	Lyndon Leathon Martin	United Democratic Party	286	37.68
Cayman Brac and Little Cayman	Audley U. Scott	Independent	137	18.05
Cayman Brac and Little Cayman	Cantrell Scott	Independent	61	8.04
Cayman Brac and Little Cayman	Kelly Thompson	Independent	57	7.51
Cayman Brac and Little Cayman	Maxine Avon Moore-McCoy	Independent	32	4.22
East End	Arden McLean	People's Progressive Movement	344	64.66
East End	John Bonwell McLean Sr.	Independent	188	35.34
George Town	Kurt Tibbetts	People's Progressive Movement	2,529	69.25
George Town	Alden McLaughlin	People's Progressive Movement	2,328	63.75
George Town	Lucille Dell Seymour	People's Progressive Movement	2,125	58.19
George Town	Alfonso Wright	People's Progressive Movement	1,646	45.07
George Town	Dr. Frank Swarre McField	United Democratic Party	875	23.96
George Town	Linford Ainsworth Pierson	People's Democratic Alliance	848	23.22
George Town	Beulah McField	United Democratic Party	700	19.17
George Town	Lloyd Austin Samson	United Democratic Party	659	18.04
George Town	Ellio Solomon	Independent	613	16.79
George Town	Berna Thompson Cummins	People's Democratic Alliance	589	16.13
George Town	John Henry Ebanks	United Democratic Party	567	15.53
George Town	Gary Rankin	People's Democratic Alliance	401	10.98
George Town	Steve Blair	People's Democratic Alliance	295	8.08
North Side	Edna Moyle	People's Progressive Movement	278	56.39
North Side	Alex E Johnson	United Democratic Party	152	30.83
North Side	Bo Miller	Independent	63	12.78
West Bay	McKeeva Bush	United Democratic Party	1,699	63.49
West Bay	Rolston Anglin	United Democratic Party	1,404	52.47
West Bay	Cline Glidden	United Democratic Party	1,296	48.43
West Bay	Eugene Ebanks	United Democratic Party	1,240	46.34
West Bay	Leonard N. Ebanks	West Bay Alliance	1,012	37.82
West Bay	Bernie A. Bush	Independent	964	36.02
West Bay	Mario E Ebanks	West Bay Alliance	940	35.13
West Bay	Dalkeith E. Bothwell	West Bay Alliance	757	28.29
West Bay	Thomas Jefferson	West Bay Alliance	740	27.65
West Bay	John Jefferson Jr.	Independent	152	5.68
West Bay	John Jefferson Sr.	Independent	82	3.06
West Bay	Cadian Ebanks	Independent	58	2.17
