= Governor of the Cayman Islands =

Official post

- Coat of arms of the Cayman Islands

- Standard of the governor of the Cayman Islands

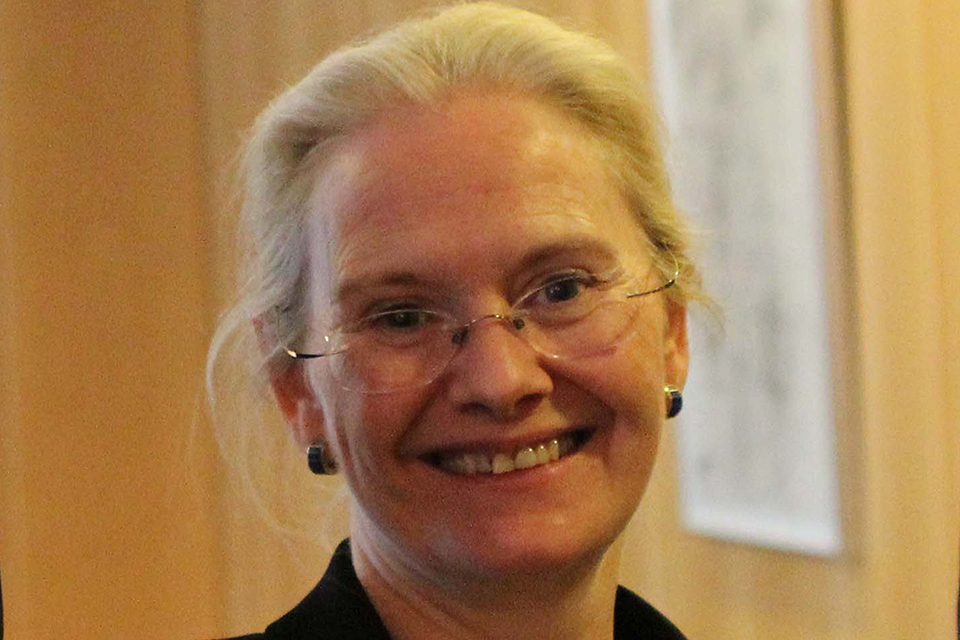
- Incumbent; Jane Owen since 21 April 2023
- Style: His/Her Excellency
- Member of: Foreign, Commonwealth and Development Office
- Residence: Government House, Seven Mile Beach, Grand Cayman
- Appointer: Monarch of the United Kingdom
- Term length: At His Majesty's pleasure
- Formation: 1750
- First holder: William Cartwright
- Deputy: Deputy Governor of the Cayman Islands
- Website: Office of the Governor

Standard of the governor of the Cayman Islands, 1971–99

The governor of the Cayman Islands is the representative of the British monarch in the United Kingdom's overseas territory of the Cayman Islands. The governor, a civil servant who has in modern times typically been a British subject normally resident in the United Kingdom, is appointed by the monarch from the staff of the Foreign Office on the advice of the British government. The role of the governor is to act as the de facto head of state, and is responsible for appointing the premier, who is the leader of the party with a majority of seats in the Legislature.

The governorship has been held by Jane Owen since April 2023.

The governor has her own flag, the Union Flag defaced with the territory's coat of arms. The official residence of the governor is the Government House in Seven Mile Beach, Grand Cayman.

== History ==
Until 1962, the Cayman Islands were administered as a dependency of Jamaica. When Jamaica gained independence, the islands were split and became a separate Crown colony. An administrator was appointed to the islands in 1959. After 1971, the British government appointed a governor. In 2013 Helen Kilpatrick became the Cayman Islands' first female governor. In 2023, Jane Owen became the second female governor.

== List of officeholders ==
Portrait	Name	Tenure
Chief magistrates of the Cayman Islands (1750–1907)
	William Cartwright	1750–1776
	William Bodden	1776–1823
	James Coe the Elder	1823–1829
	John Drayton	1829–1842
	James Coe the Younger	1842–1855
	William Eden	1855–1879
	William Bodden Webster	1879–1888
	Edmund Parsons	1888–1907
Commissioners of the Cayman Islands (1898–1959)
	Frederick Shedden Sanguinetti	1898–1906
	George Stephenson Hirst	1907–1912
	Arthur C Robinson	1912–1919
	Hugh Houston Hutchings	1919–1929
	Captain G. H. Frith	1929–1931
	Ernest Arthur Weston	1931–1934
	Allan Wolsey Cardinall, CMG (later Sir Allan)	1934–1940
	Albert C. Panton Snr, MBE (acting)	1940–1941
	John Perry Jones	1941–1946
	Ivor Otterbein Smith (later CMG, OBE)	1946–1952
	Andrew Morris Gerrard, CMG	1952–1956
	Alan Hillard Donald	1956 – 4 July 1959
Administrators of the Cayman Islands (1960–1971)
	Wing Commander Jack Rose CMG, MBE, DFC	1960–1964
	John Alfred Cumber CMG, MBE, TD	1964–1968
	Athelstan Charles Ethelwulf Long	1968 – 22 August 1971
Governors of the Cayman Islands (1971–present)
	Athelstan Charles Ethelwulf Long	22 August 1971 – 1972
	Kenneth Roy Crook	1972–1974
	Thomas Russell	1974–1981
	George Peter Lloyd	1982 – 10 June 1987
	Alan James Scott	10 June 1987 – 14 September 1992
	Michael Edward John Gore	14 September 1992 – 16 October 1995
	John Wynne Owen	16 October 1995 – 5 May 1999
	Peter Smith	5 May 1999 – 9 May 2002
	Bruce Dinwiddy	19 May 2002 – 28 October 2005
	Stuart Jack	23 November 2005 – 2 December 2009
	Donovan Ebanks	2 December 2009 – 15 January 2010
	Duncan Taylor	15 January 2010 – 7 August 2013
	Helen Kilpatrick	6 September 2013 – 5 March 2018
	Anwar Choudhury	26 March 2018 – 20 October 2018
	Martyn Roper	29 October 2018 – 29 March 2023
	Jane Owen	21 April 2023 – present
