= 2005 general election =

2005 general election may refer to:

- 2005 British Columbia general election
- 2005 Anguillan general election
- 2005 Caymanian general election
- 2005 Central African general election
- 2005 Dominican general election
- 2005 Ethiopian general election
- 2005 Honduran general election
- 2005 Japanese general election
- 2005 Jersey general election
- 2005 Lebanese general election
- 2005 Liberian general election
- 2005 Mauritian general election
- 2005 New Zealand general election
- 2005 Niuean general election
- 2005 Northern Territory general election, in Australia
- 2005 Tanzanian general election
- 2005 Thai general election
- 2005 Tongan general election
- 2005 United Kingdom general election
