= Dart Interests =

American real estate company

- Type: Private
- Industry: Real estate development and investment
- Founded: 2011
- Founder: Kenneth B. Dart
- Headquarters: Dallas, Texas
- Key people: Christopher Kelsey (President)
- Website: dartinterests.com

Dart Interests is a privately held real estate development and investment firm headquartered in Dallas, Texas. Founded in 2011, the company is owned by Kenneth B. Dart, and operates as the domestic real estate platform of the broader Dart family of companies, which includes Dart Container and Dart Enterprises (Grand Cayman).

The firm manages real estate across multiple asset classes including luxury hospitality, mixed-use urban development, multifamily residential, office, and industrial. Projects include Evermore Orlando Resort, adjacent to Walt Disney World; The Treadwell, a residential condominium on Manhattan's Upper East Side; Novel South Capitol, a multifamily community in Washington, D.C.; and Novel RiNo, a mixed-use residential development in Denver's River North Art District.

Dart Interests operates regional offices in Orlando, Florida and Salt Lake City, Utah.

== History ==
Dart Interests was founded in 2011 as the U.S. real estate investment and development arm of Kenneth B. Dart. The firm initially operated in commercial and residential markets across multiple states before expanding its scope to large-scale, capital-intensive projects.

In the mid-2010s, the firm (operating at the time as Third Palm Capital) acquired the former Exxon Chemical office campus in Houston, Texas. The site was later rebranded as Republic Square.

In 2018, Dart Interests expanded into the local condominium market by completing VistaBlue Singer Island, a 19-story oceanfront condominium development in Riviera Beach, Florida.

In 2020, the firm completed a two-year renovation of Republic Square following damage from Hurricane Harvey. Post-renovation, new tenants included Samsung, Gate Energy, and Sparkhound.

Between 2021 and 2024, Dart Interests developed a hospitality property combining centrally owned vacation rental homes with an on-site hotel. The Evermore Orlando Resort, an 1,100 acre property near Walt Disney World opened in January 2024.

In 2022 and 2023, the firm expanded its North Texas presence and acquired the former Fort Worth Central Library property in downtown Fort Worth, which formed the basis for a planned mixed-use redevelopment near Sundance Square.

In 2025, Dart Interests completed the sale of a 1.5-million-square-foot industrial warehouse property in Corsicana, Texas.

== Corporate structure ==
Dart Interests operates as the U.S. real estate investment and development platform of the Dart family of companies. The company is affiliated through common ownership with Dart Enterprises (Grand Cayman) and Dart Container, though each entity operates independently. Dart Interests was previously known as Third Palm Capital.

== Projects ==
=== Hospitality ===
Dart Interests develops and invests in resort and hospitality projects. Its primary portfolio project in this asset class is the Evermore Orlando Resort, a residential hospitality development adjacent to Walt Disney World in Orlando, Florida. It includes vacation homes, a lagoon and beach, the Conrad Orlando hotel, and additional facilities.

Another Dart Interest hospitality project includes the Wild Dunes Resort, developed in partnership with Lowe Enterprises.

=== Residential ===
Dart Interests’ residential development focuses largely on multifamily projects and condominiums. Examples include:

- The Treadwell (Manhattan, New York City): a 66-unit residential condominium tower located next to the Treadwell Farm Historic District; developed in partnership with Zeckendorf Development
- Novel South Capitol (Washington, D.C.): a 539-unit multifamily community; the project is LEED Silver and Fitwell certified
- Novel RiNo (Denver, Colorado): a multifamily development in the arts district
- VistaBlue Singer Island (Riviera Beach, Florida): a 58-unit luxury oceanfront condominium development
- The Leyton (Manhattan, New York City): a 30-story luxury tower developed in partnership with Real Estate Inverlad
- The Clare (Manhattan, New York City): a 19-story condominium

=== Mixed-use and commercial ===
Dart Interests acquires and redevelops various mixed-use and commercial properties, including:

- The Florence/Fort Worth Central Library redevelopment (Fort Worth, Texas): residential, office, retail, and public-oriented spaces
- Republic Square (Houston, Texas): a 35-acre office campus
- Scripps Life Sciences Campus (San Diego, California): a 200,000-square-foot life sciences research campus leased to Fate Therapeutics
- Salt Lake City land holdings (Salt Lake City, Utah): a 2.32-acre site planned for future mixed-use high-rise residential development

=== Divested properties ===
- The Corsicana property: an industrial warehouse facility in Corsicana, Texas, sold in 2024

== See also ==
- Kenneth Dart
