= Edna Moyle =

Caymanian politician (1942–2013)

The Honourable Edna M. Moyle, OBE, JP OBE

Speaker of the Legislative Assembly of the Cayman Islands
- In office 18 May 2005 – 27 May 2009
- Monarch: Elizabeth II
- Governor: Bruce Dinwiddy; Stuart Jack
- Preceded by: Linford Pierson
- Succeeded by: Mary Lawrence

Member of the Legislative Assembly of the Cayman Islands
- In office November 1992 – 27 May 2009
- Constituency: North Side

Personal details
- Born: Edna Marie Miller; 19 January 1942 Grand Cayman, Cayman Islands
- Died: 21 May 2013 (aged 71) Grand Cayman, Cayman Islands
- Party: People's Progressive Movement

Edna M. Moyle, OBE, JP OBE (19 January 1942 – 21 May 2013) was a Caymanian politician who served as the Member of the Legislative Assembly for the district of North Side from 1992 to 2009, including a tenure the Speaker of the Legislative Assembly of the Cayman Islands from May 2005 until May 2009.

== Life ==
Born 19 January 1942, in George Town to William Wilbanks Miller, a North Side builder of homes, hotels and schooners, and Celeste Miller (née Ebanks), she was the youngest of ten children. Her mother died when Edna was only seven and after attending the North Side Town Hall School at the primary level, her father sent her to Jamaica's Knox College. She also completed commercial studies in Jamaica.

Returning to the Cayman Islands, Moyle worked in the private sector until 1966 when she joined government service, holding a range of jobs including personal secretary to the then administrator, John A Cumber, as well as working as deputy clerk of the Legislative Assembly. Then in 1979, she rejoined the private sector.

Moyle first ran for public office in 1984, having been approached by voters in her district. She was elected the Member for North Side on her third attempt in 1992 and remained an MLA until May 2009.

She also served as the House Deputy Speaker for eight years, before becoming the Minister of Community Development, Sports, Women's Affairs and Youth from November 2000 – November 2001, concerns all dear to her. In May 2005, she was elected Speaker of the House, a post she retained until her retirement. She ran a tight ship, maintaining the dignity and decorum of the Legislative Assembly, even in the heat of debate, applying House rules fairly and impartially and upholding minority rights and views as a member of the majority ruling People's Progressive Movement party.

As an MLA, her accomplishments were legion. One cause she championed early in her first term in office was the call to end discrimination against women in the civil service in several respects, including the denial of maternity leave. She was also largely responsible for government establishing a women's affairs office and she was a guiding force in the launching of Cayman's Legal Befrienders Clinic, through which women in need could obtain free legal advice.

Other positive outcomes from Moyle's support of women's causes in the House included the collection of gender-based statistics; the introduction of curriculum education on sex and contraception for teens; the placement of domestic violence on Cayman's public agenda; and addressing the inadequacy of sentences that courts could impose for crimes against women. She also moved a Private Member's Motion that called for a separate family protection police unit to handle family issues with greater sensitivity. Government accepted the motion and the Family Support Unit was established away from police headquarters to handle all family-related matters. She also supported a motion that called for a safe house for battered women and their children. Facilitated by landmark domestic violence legislation, reported domestic abuse incidents had increased; government accepted the motion and Cayman's Crisis Centre was born. As a cabinet minister she had set plans in motion to establish a youth remand facility.

In North Side, Moyle worked diligently on behalf of her district's older residents and she was active in establishing the library, the health centre, the civic centre, police station and community park. She also worked to set up netball and basketball courts and to complete the Old Man Bay playing field.

In 2009 the former legislator and Speaker of the House was made an Officer of the Order of the British Empire (OBE) in the 2009 Queen Elizabeth II Birthday Honours for her contributions to politics in the Cayman Islands.

== Death ==
Hon. Edna M. Moyle, OBE, JP, 71 died on 21 May 2013 around noon surrounded by her family and friends at the Cayman Islands Hospital.
