= George Town, Cayman Islands =

Capital of the Cayman Islands

George Town
- City (Note: George Town technically lacks city status for it to be a city.)
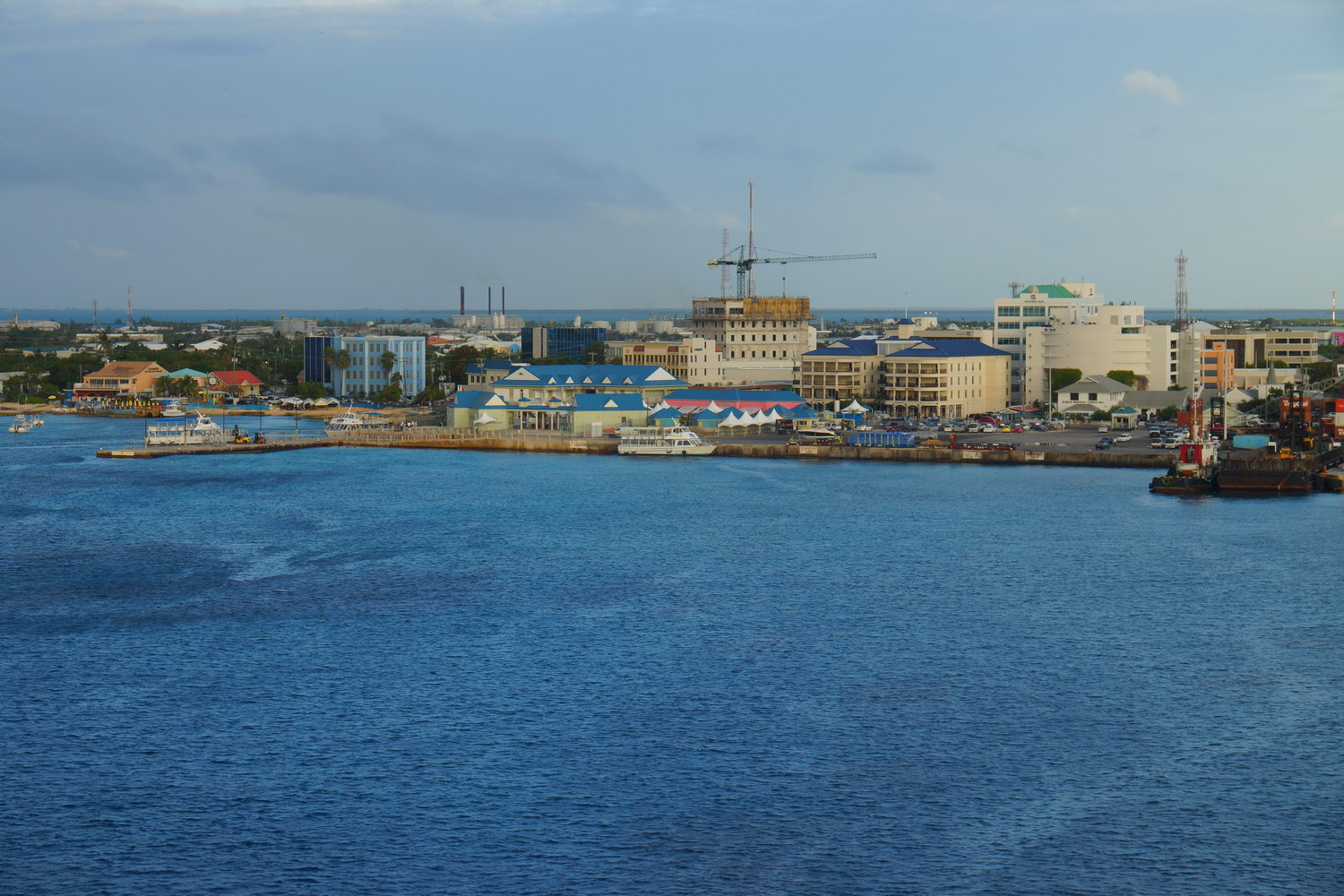
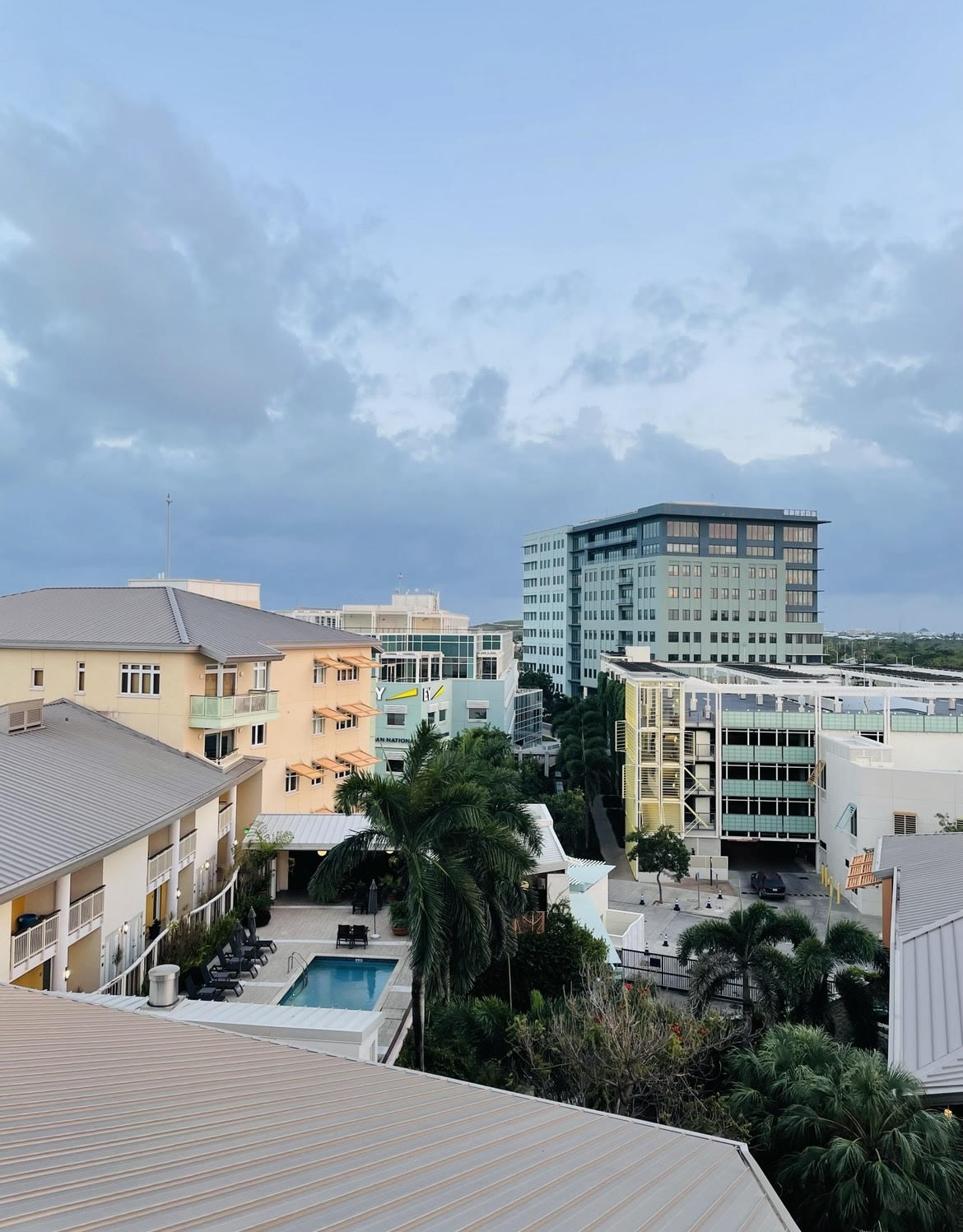
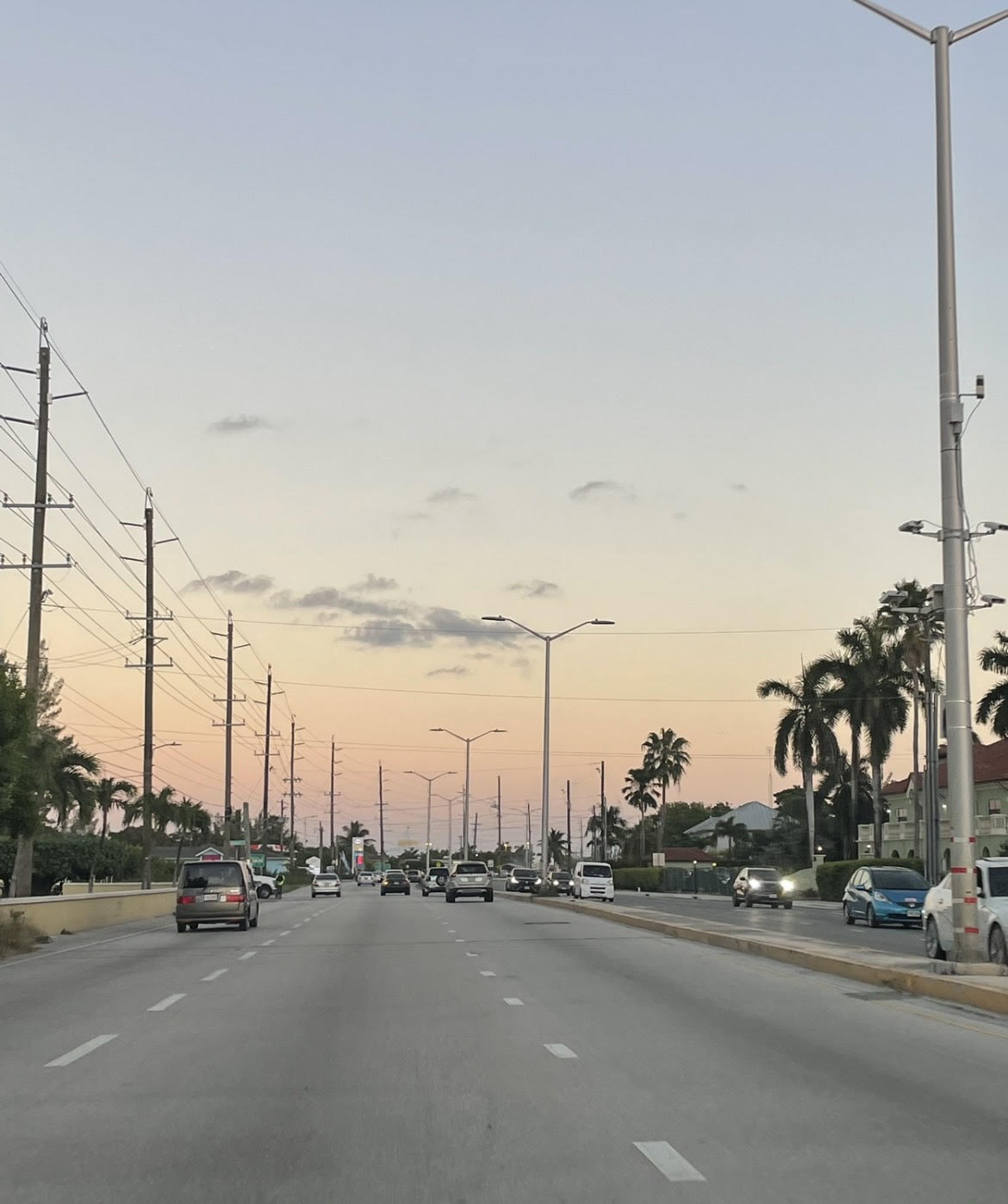
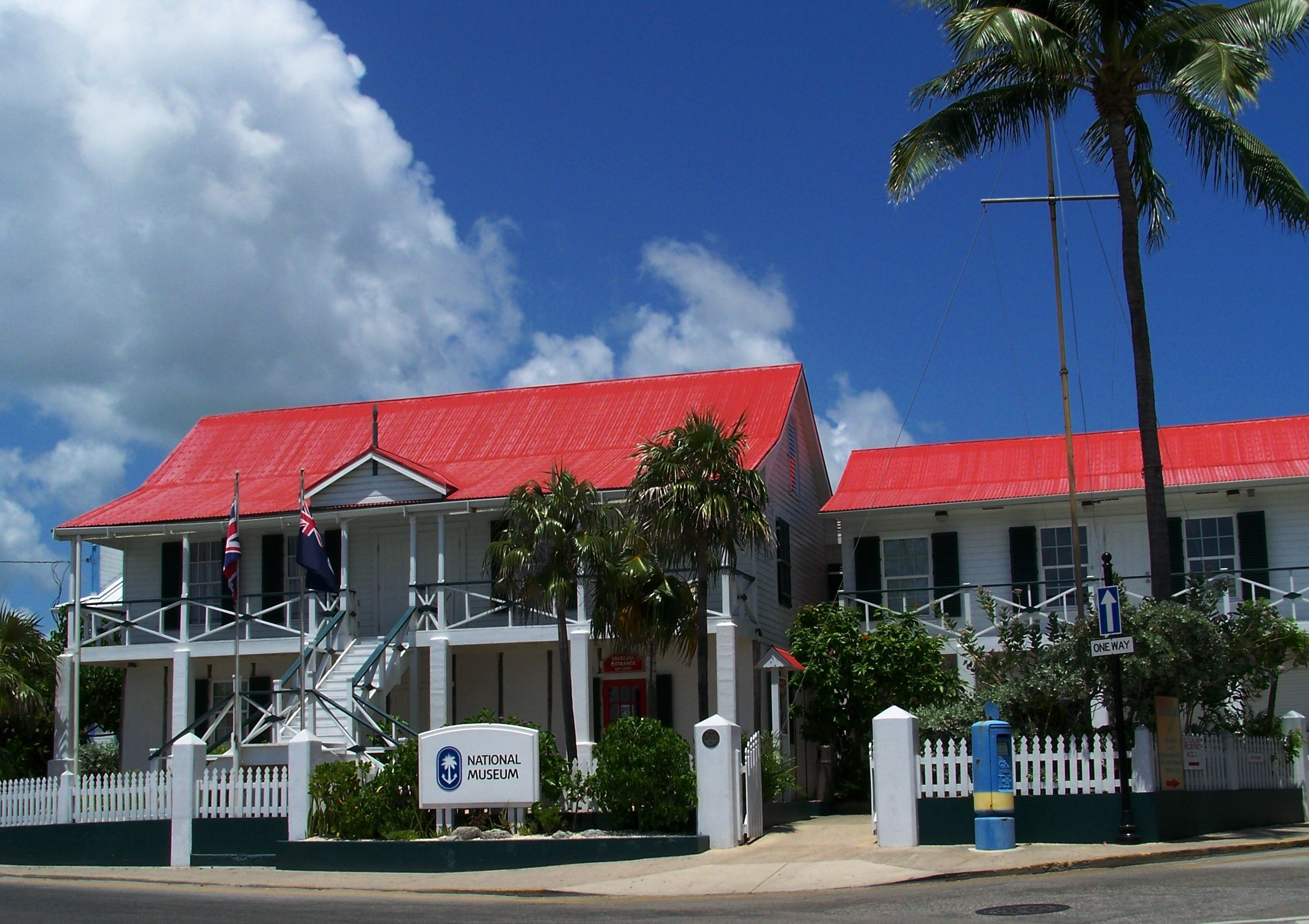
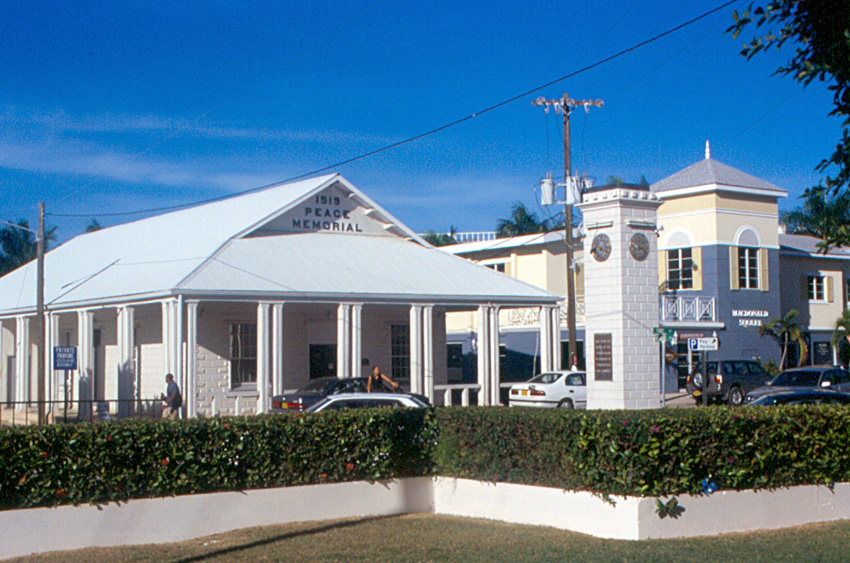
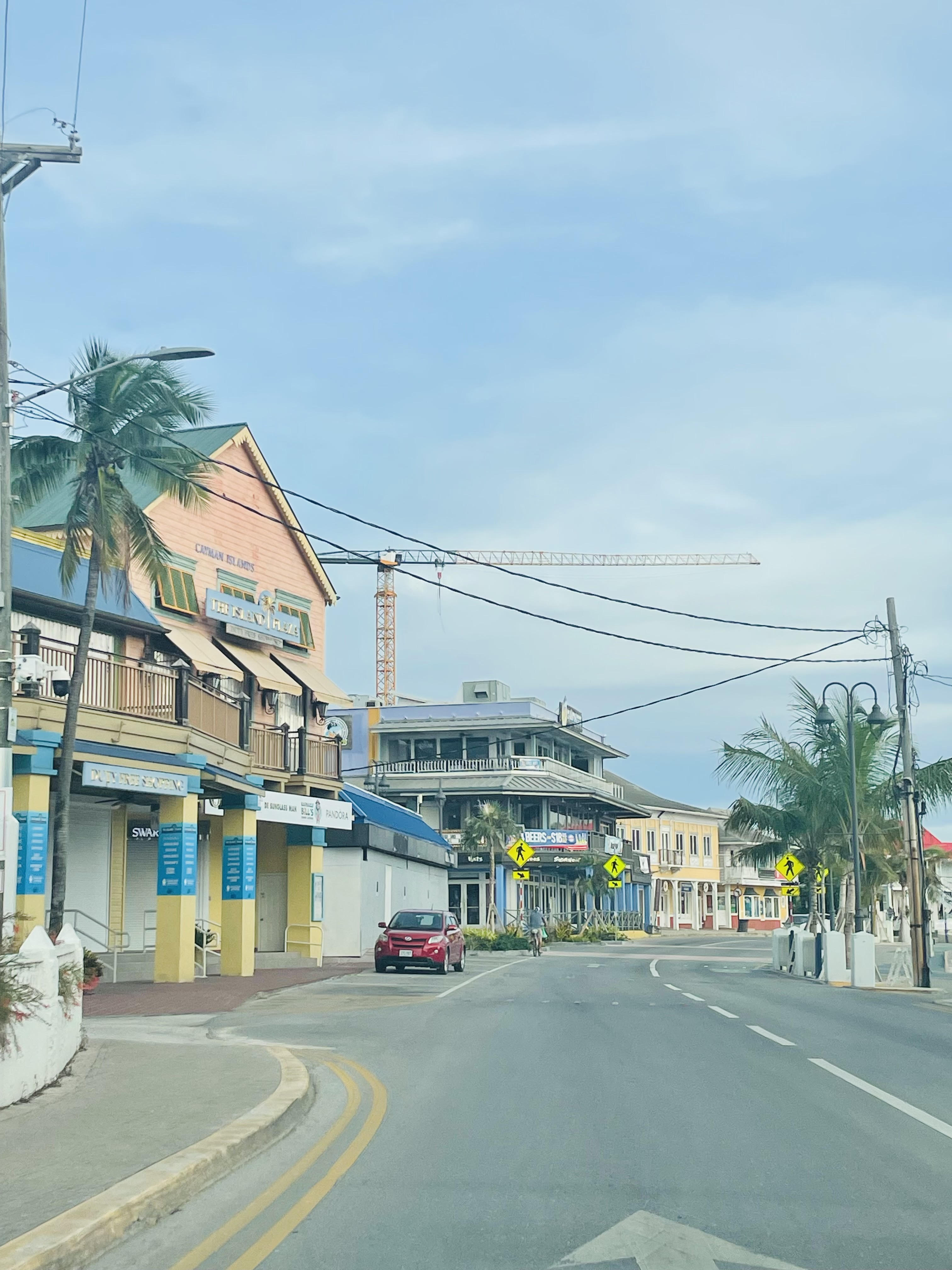
- George Town skyline Camana Bay Esterly Tibbitts Highway National Museum 1919 Peace Memorial South Church Street (George Town Waterfront)

- Location within Cayman Islands Location within North America
- Coordinates: 19°17′47″N 81°22′54″W
- Sovereignty: United Kingdom
- Overseas Territory: Cayman Islands
- Island: Grand Cayman

Area
  - Total: 11 sq mi (29 km^{2})
- Elevation: 9.8 ft (3 m)

Population (2025)
  - Total: 47,009
  - Density: 4,200/sq mi (1,600/km^{2})
- Time zone: UTC−05:00 (EST)
- Area code: +1-345

George Town is the capital and largest city in the Cayman Islands, located on Grand Cayman. It was named after King George III. As of 2025, the city had a population of 47,009, making it the largest city (by population) of all the British Overseas Territories.

The Caymanian government offices are located in the city. According to the Globalization and World Cities Research Network in 2020, George Town is classed as a Beta city.

== Government ==
The Caymanian government offices are located in George Town. These offices include the Parliament of the Cayman Islands, the Court Houses and the Government Administration Building. The Government Administration Building houses the offices of the Premier and other members of Cabinet, the Deputy Governor and his staff as well as other elected officials and civil servants. The former Old Courts Building located at the corner of Shedden Road and Harbour Drive is now the National Museum of Grand Cayman. The building was built more than 150 years ago and has served the Caymanian government not only as a court building but as a jail and the island's first official Post Office.

The Cayman Islands are a British Overseas Territory; however, they are given special autonomy when dealing with domestic affairs. Foreign affairs are the responsibility of the British appointed Governor and the British Government. The British Army will also be called to defend or assist the islands in the event of a natural disaster or military conflict. It is also trusted that the United States would assist the islands in time of need if the UK requests, seeing that the US is closer in proximity to the islands than the UK.

== Politics ==
The politics of George Town is dominated by the People's Progressive Movement, who won 5 out of the 7 electoral districts in the city during the 2021 general election. They believe in introducing a nationwide welfare program, an increased financial presence in the UK, EU and US, reduced interference by the UK in domestic affairs and funding sustainable development projects across the islands.

In 2022, George Town participated in the Platinum Jubilee Civic Honours to gain city status, with it being the first contest open to applicants from the overseas territories. It lost out to another British Overseas Territory capital of Stanley, Falkland Islands.

== Demographics ==
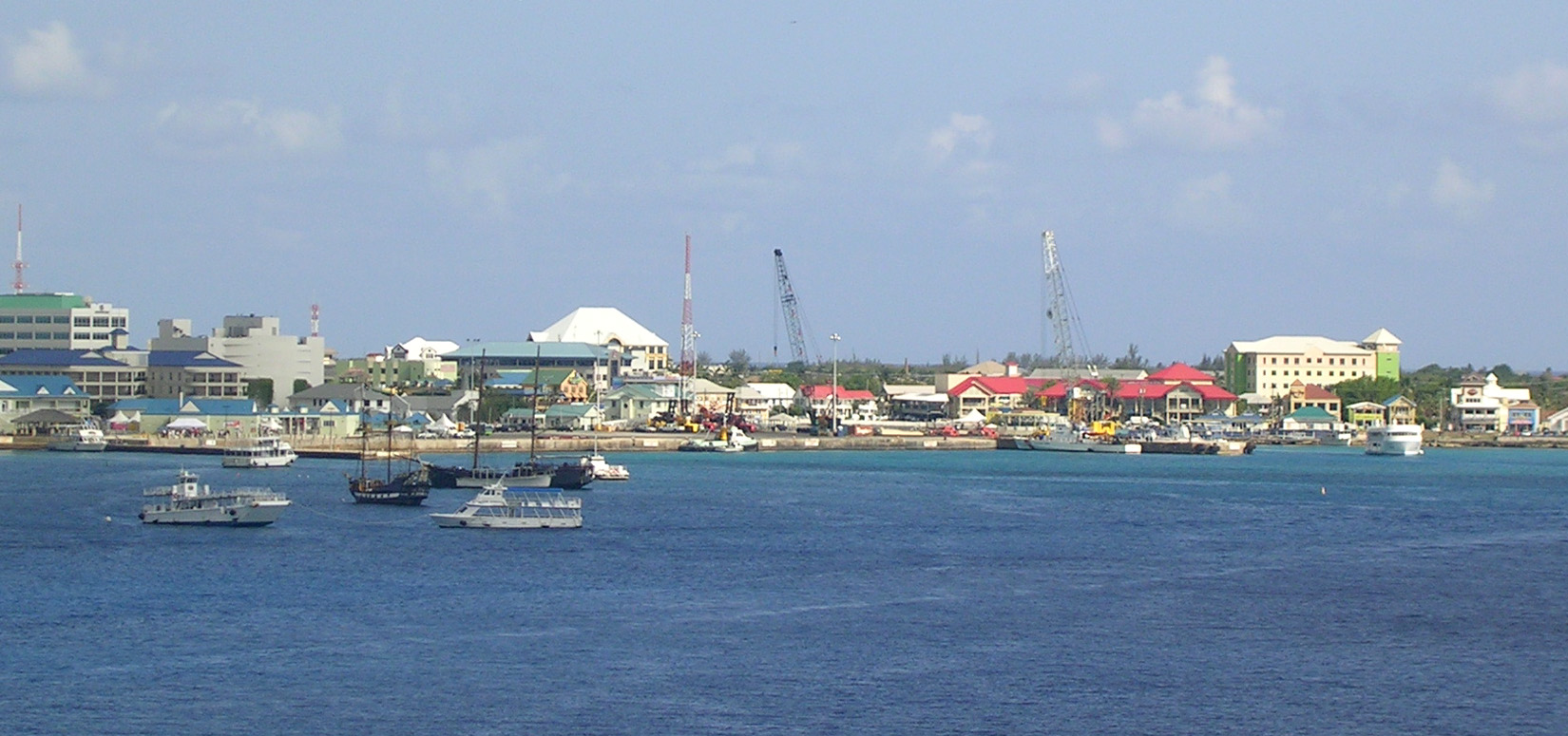
Aerial view of George Town

George Town’s residents by country of origin
Nationalities	percent
Cayman Islands	37.9%
Jamaica	27.0%
The Philippines	8.1%
United Kingdom	7%
United States	5.3%
Canada	4.0%
Honduras	3.5%
India	2.7%
South Africa	1.5%
Nicaragua	1.1%
Ireland	1%
Other	0.9%

49.6% of the Cayman Islands population live in George Town. It has recorded residents from more than one hundred countries. 37.9% of George Town's residents are Caymanian, and 63.8% are immigrants and permanent residents. The vast majority of the city's population are immigrants, mostly hailing from Jamaica, the Philippines, the United Kingdom, the United States, Canada, Honduras and India. There is also a growing South African population.

Christianity is the most followed religion in the city, with most being Protestant with a sizable Roman Catholic population. There is also a Jewish center and Islamic Society in the city.

== Geography ==
George Town's city limits extend from the east at the edge of the South Shore District, north just beyond Owen Roberts International Airport, south to Hog Sty Bay and west to Seven Mile Beach and the West Bay District. George Town's famous Seven Mile Beach is a long crescent of coral-sand beach extending up to the West Bay region of Grand Cayman and is the most popular and populated area for tourists on the island.

=== Climate ===
George Town has a tropical savanna climate (Köppen Aw), with a hot and wet season from May through November, and a very warm and dry season from December through April. As with most tropical climates, there is only a slight variation in monthly mean temperatures during the course of the year.

Climate data for George Town (Owen Roberts International Airport) 1991–2020, extremes 1962–2024
Month	Jan	Feb	Mar	Apr	May	Jun	Jul	Aug	Sep	Oct	Nov	Dec	Year
Record high humidex	39.2	42.6	43.3	43.5	45.4	43.8	45.5	44.8	44.8	44.1	43.1	43.1	45.5
Record high °C (°F)	32.2 (90.0)	31.7 (89.0)	32.2 (90.0)	32.8 (91.0)	34.4 (93.9)	34.4 (94.0)	35.3 (95.5)	35.0 (95.0)	34.7 (94.5)	33.7 (92.7)	33.6 (92.5)	32.2 (90.0)	35.3 (95.5)
Mean daily maximum °C (°F)	28.4 (83.1)	28.7 (83.7)	29.2 (84.6)	30.1 (86.2)	31.0 (87.8)	31.7 (89.0)	32.3 (90.1)	32.3 (90.1)	31.9 (89.4)	31.2 (88.2)	29.6 (85.3)	28.9 (84.0)	30.4 (86.7)
Daily mean °C (°F)	26.0 (78.8)	26.3 (79.3)	26.7 (80.0)	27.7 (81.9)	28.5 (83.3)	29.3 (84.8)	29.7 (85.5)	29.8 (85.7)	29.4 (85.0)	28.6 (83.4)	27.6 (81.7)	26.8 (80.2)	28.1 (82.5)
Mean daily minimum °C (°F)	23.1 (73.6)	22.9 (73.2)	23.1 (73.6)	24.3 (75.7)	25.1 (77.2)	25.8 (78.4)	25.9 (78.6)	26.0 (78.8)	25.7 (78.3)	25.2 (77.4)	24.5 (76.1)	23.6 (74.5)	24.6 (76.3)
Record low °C (°F)	12.2 (54.0)	11.1 (52.0)	12.8 (55.0)	12.2 (54.0)	13.9 (57.0)	16.7 (62.1)	20.0 (68.0)	19.4 (66.9)	20.0 (68.0)	18.9 (66.0)	14.4 (57.9)	14.1 (57.4)	11.1 (52.0)
Average rainfall mm (inches)	54 (2.13)	31 (1.21)	30 (1.17)	34 (1.33)	150 (5.89)	161 (6.34)	135 (5.31)	147 (5.79)	216 (8.52)	244 (9.60)	157 (6.18)	65 (2.57)	1,423 (56.02)
Average rainy days (≥ 0.1mm)	7	6	6	4	10	12	12	14	16	15	12	9	123
Average relative humidity (%)	77	77	76	76	78	79	77	78	80	80	78	78	77
Mean monthly sunshine hours	242.2	224	279	300	279	240	322.9	248	240	248	210	217	3,050.1
Mean daily sunshine hours	7.8	8	9	10	9	8	10.4	8	8	8	7	7	8.4
Average ultraviolet index	8	10	12	12	12	12	12	12	11	10	8	7	11
Source 1: National Weather Service (Cayman Islands)
Source 2: Weather in Cayman Weather Spark Climate-Data

Climate data for George Town
Month	Jan	Feb	Mar	Apr	May	Jun	Jul	Aug	Sep	Oct	Nov	Dec	Year
Average sea temperature °C (°F)	26.6 (79.9)	26.6 (79.9)	26.8 (80.2)	27.7 (81.9)	28.3 (82.9)	28.7 (83.7)	29.2 (84.6)	30.0 (86.0)	29.9 (85.8)	29.3 (84.7)	28.6 (83.5)	28.0 (82.4)	27.9 (82.2)
Source #1: seatemperature.org
Source #2: Weather Atlas

== Economy ==
=== Finance ===
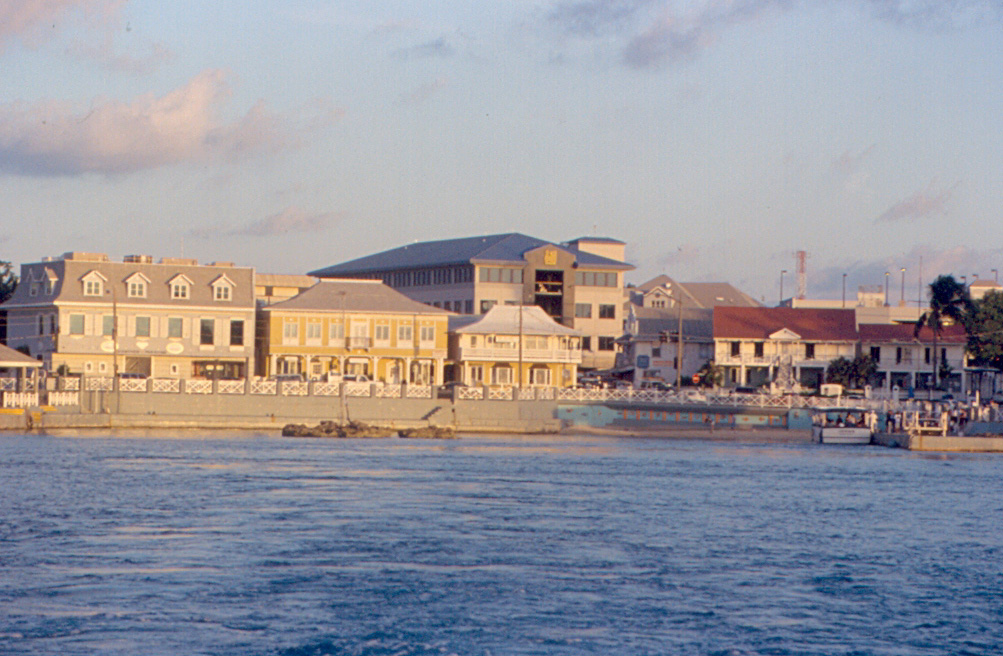
George Town Waterfront

The financial services generated CI$1.2 billion of GDP in 2007 (55% of the total economy), 36% of all employment and 40% of all government revenue. The Cayman Islands ranks fifth internationally in terms of value of liabilities booked and sixth in terms of assets booked. It has branches of 40 of the world's 50 largest banks. The Cayman Islands are the second largest captive domicile in the world with more than 700 captives, writing more than US$7.7 billion of premiums and with US$36.8 billion of assets under management. There are more than 9,500 funds under licence with globally recognised legal, audit/accounting and fund administration services (incl. the Big Four auditors). Major law firms such as Maples and Calder and Ogier (law firm) have established themselves in the Cayman Islands. Similarly, large accounting firms such as KPMG, PwC, Ernst & Young and Deloitte are also present. As a result, the Cayman Islands are a leader in captive domiciles, hedge fund registrations and is considered a major international banking centre.

=== Tourism ===
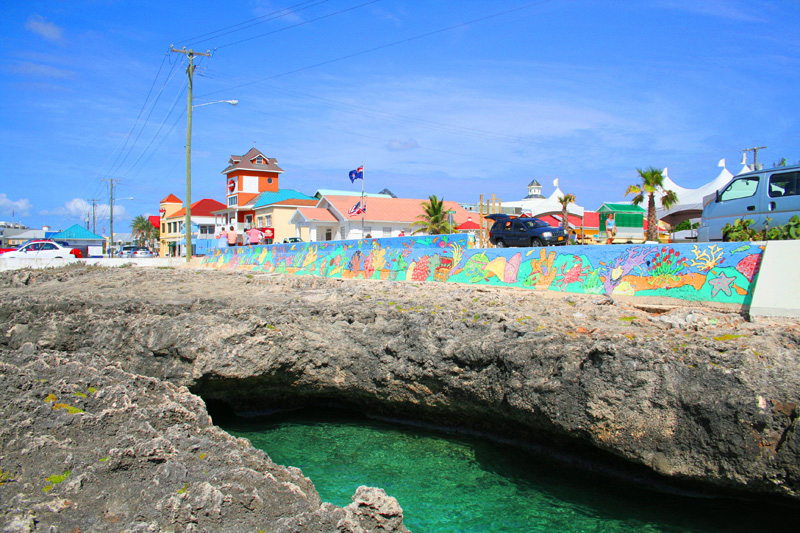
The Waterfront near Harbour House

George Town is a popular port of call for the Caribbean with cruise ships anchoring in George Town Harbour Tuesday through Friday. Cruise ships calling at George Town anchor offshore and ferry their passengers ashore by tenders, also known as shuttle boats. Passengers disembark in George Town, in the centre of the Grand Cayman shopping district and usually remain anchored from early morning until mid-afternoon.

Activities available to tourists in George Town include submarine tours of George Town Harbour, glass-bottom boat tours, snorkelling, scuba-diving, parasailing, charter boat tours, rum distillery tours, art galleries, a historical museum, and of course, shopping and eating. For nightlife, Seven Mile Beach is host to numerous nightclubs and bars. George Town's waterfront is also home to a Harley-Davidson shop, a Jimmy Buffett's Margaritaville franchise, and a Guy Harvey art studio and restaurant. The Kimpton Seafire Resort and Spa and The Ritz-Carlton Grand Cayman are the most expensive hotels on the island.

== Neighbourhoods ==
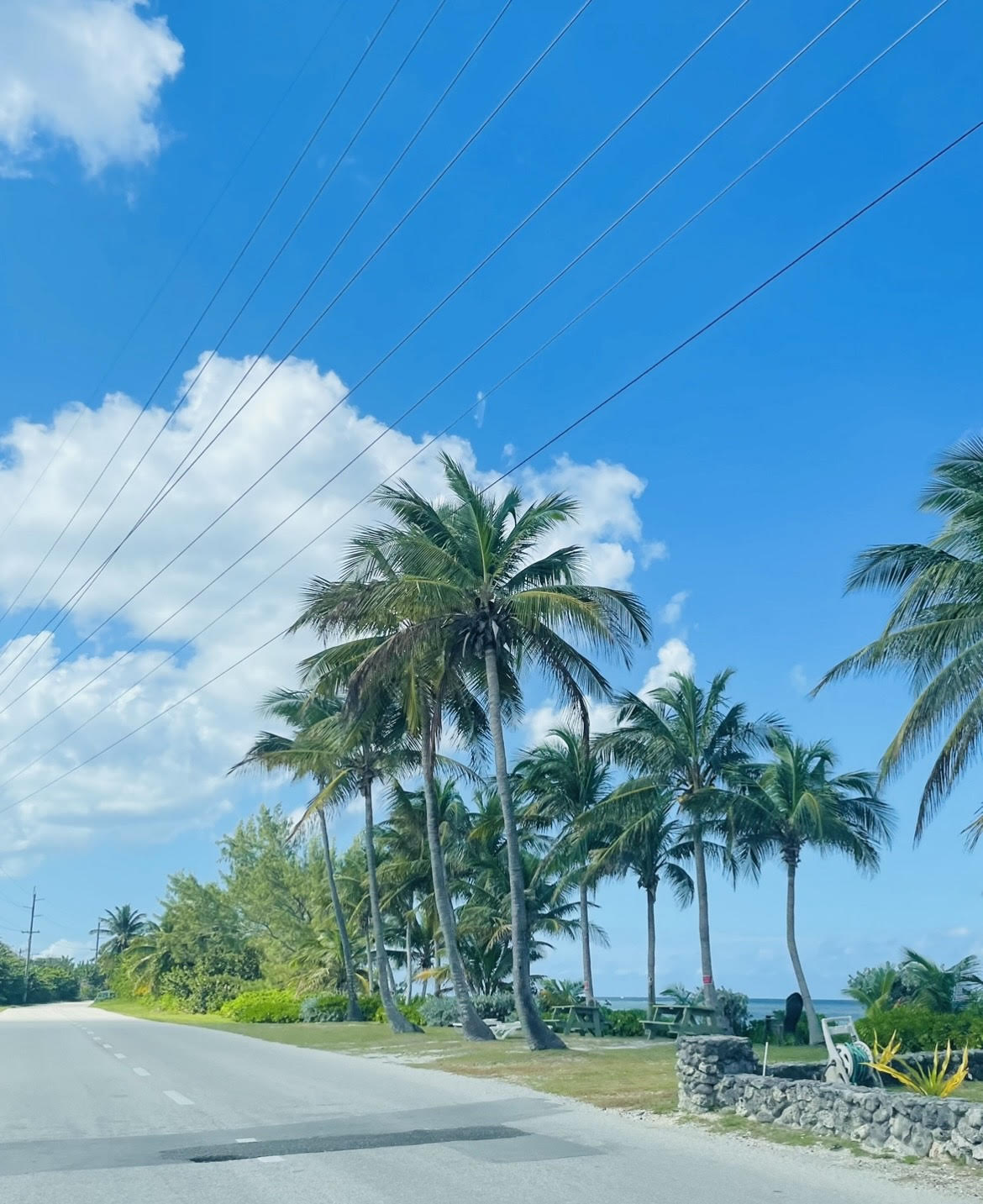
Palm Trees on a Cayman Islands coastline

- Spotts is a residential area south-east of George Town. It is famous for its Spotts Beach.
- Red Bay is a residential area in east George Town. It has one primary school, Red Bay Primary School. George Town’s main highway from the east is located here.
- Prospect is located to the east of George Town, as the city limits end. It is a residential area with one primary school, and a few convenience stores.
- South Sound is a suburb to the south of the city and boasts some of the most expensive homes in the Cayman Islands. There are a few private schools, including St. Ignatius Catholic School, Cayman Prep High School, and Montessori, as well as a Government school, John Gray High School, and the University College of the Cayman Islands.
- Downtown George Town is the center of the city's financial industry, and also houses the Parliament of the Cayman Islands and the main courthouse. With a surplus of banks and law firms, downtown is the center of the territory's business sector. George Town Primary School is also located here.
- Whitehall Estates is a residential area north of Downtown George Town, near Seven Mile Beach.
- Dog City is a residential area nearest to Downtown George Town and has a few shops and amenities.
- Central George Town is the busiest area of the city, where most commuters will go through to get to other areas of the city. It is lined with shopping centers and the Cayman Islands Container Yard, which is operated by the Port Authority.
- Windsor Park is a residential area in Central George Town with a few parks. Triple C School is located near this area.
- Meegan Galeano Estates is a residential area near West Bay Road and is adjacent to Eastern Avenue
- Industrial Park is to the north-east of George Town, where most of the island's factories and Government Ministries are located. Owen Roberts International Airport is operated here.
- Tropical Gardens is a residential area south of Owen Roberts International Airport just off of Crewe Road.
- Half Way Pond is a residential area near South Sound and has one school for both primary and middle school students, First Baptist Christian School.
- Grand Harbour is just off of the main highway entering George Town from the east. It has a shopping center of the same name and an affluent residential area to the north.
- Camana Bay acts as its own town north of George Town, but would still be included as a neighborhood of the city. It is a pedestrianized area with many shops and cafes, including a cinema, as well as apartment and office blocks. It has one private school, Cayman International School.
- Seven Mile Beach is the center of the Cayman Islands tourism industry, and is lined with luxury hotels, condos, bars, clubs, shopping centers and boutiques. It has an overhead pedestrian path to Camana Bay.

== Transportation ==
=== Air ===
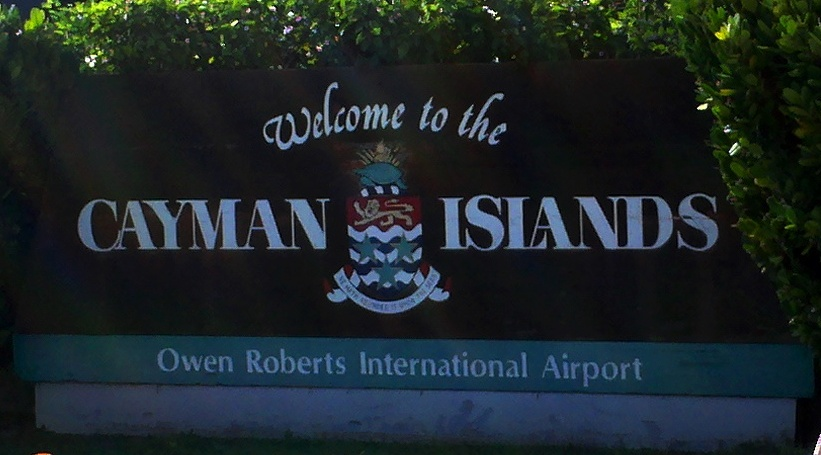
A 'welcome' sign at Owen Roberts International Airport, east of the city

George Town, as well as the rest of Grand Cayman, is served by nearby Owen Roberts International Airport. It is one of the only two entrance points to the Cayman Islands by air, the other being Charles Kirkconnell Airport on Cayman Brac.

There are over 55 weekly flights into the Cayman Islands. Cayman Airways is the National Flag Carrier of the Cayman Islands and features 3 Boeing 737 MAX 8 jets, 2 Saab B+ and two Twin Otters. Non-stop service to Grand Cayman are available from Atlanta, Chicago, Tampa, Newark, London, Toronto, New York, Montego Bay, Washington D.C., Havana, Miami, Panama City, La Ceiba and more.

=== Road ===
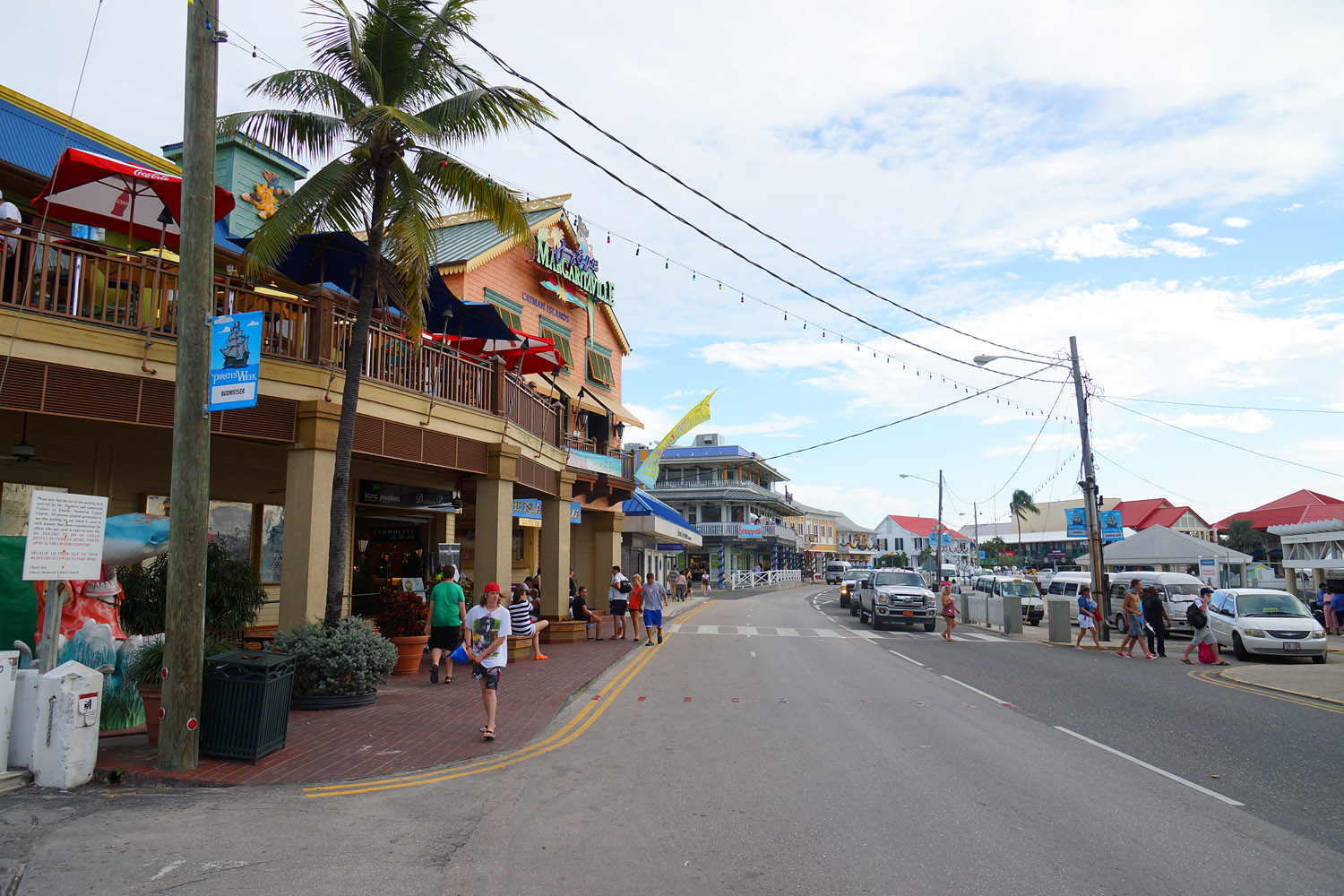
Downtown George Town

The following highways serve the city:

- East/West Arterial
- Linford Pierson Highway
- Esterly Tibbetts Highway
- Maxine Eldermire Way

=== Buses ===
A fleet of share taxi minibuses serve the city.

== Education ==
The Cayman Islands Education Department operates George Town Primary School, Red Bay Primary School, Prospect Primary School, John Gray High School and the University College of the Cayman Islands.

John Gray High is in the former George Hicks High School building since 2012.

Caymanian children are entitled to free primary and secondary education. Various churches and private foundations operate several private schools that offer American and British based studies starting from nursery up to A Levels and College.

Private schools include:

- Cayman International School
- Cayman Prep & High School
- St. Ignatius Catholic School

The Montessori School also operates three schools in George Town. The schools are located on South Church Street, Hind's Way (off Walkers Road) and Prospect Point Road in Red Bay.

St. Matthew's University, a Medical and Veterinary school, is located on the outskirts of George Town.

== Notable people ==
- Alex Andrade (b. 1989) – American politician
- Truman Bodden (b. 1945) – Premier of the Cayman Islands
- Robin Bourne-Taylor (b. 1981) – Olympic rower and British Army officer
- Geoffrey Butler (b. 1995) – Olympic swimmer
- Lara Butler (b. 1994) – Olympic swimmer
- Jordan Crooks (b. 2002) – swimmer
- Tyrell Cuffy (b. 1988) – sprinter
- Mason Duval (b. 2001) – footballer who represented the Cayman Islands national team
- Jonah Ebanks (b. 1996) – footballer who represented the Cayman Islands national team
- Marshall Forbes (b. 1980) – footballer who represented the Cayman Islands national team
- Brett Fraser (b. 1989) – Olympic swimmer
- Shaune Fraser (b. 1988) – Olympic swimmer
- Joshewa Frederick-Charlery (b. 1997) – footballer who represented the Cayman Islands national team
- Cameron Gray (b. 1998) – footballer who represented the Cayman Islands national team
- Kemar Hyman (b. 1989) – sprinter
- Alden McLaughlin (b. 1961) – Premier of the Cayman Islands
- Tuda Murphy (b. 1980) – footballer who represented the Cayman Islands national team
- Anthony Nelson (b. 1997) – footballer who represented the Cayman Islands national team
- D'Andre Rowe (b. 2001) – footballer who represented the Cayman Islands national team
- Elijah Seymour (b. 1998) – footballer who represented the Cayman Islands national team
- Kurt Tibbetts (b. 1954) – Premier of the Cayman Islands
