= Government House, Cayman Islands =

Government House
- Interactive map of the Government House area

General information
- Type: official residence
- Location: Seven Mile Beach, Grand Cayman, Cayman Islands
- Coordinates: 19.340605°N 81.380959°W
- Current tenants: Governor of the Cayman Islands
- Inaugurated: 1964
- Owner: Government of the Cayman Islands

Website
- http://ukincayman.fco.gov.uk/en/about-us/government-house

Government House is the official residence of the governor of the Cayman Islands, located in Seven Mile Beach in Grand Cayman. It is also the official residence of the head of state of the Cayman Islands (currently King Charles III) when staying in the Cayman Islands.

The building was constructed in 1964 as a replacement to the older Government House which was located in George Town (the older Government House burnt down in 1972). The current Government House was constructed specifically as an official residence for the Governors of the Cayman Islands.

Today, Government House is also used for national and ceremonial functions, as well as receptions and meetings with visiting foreign dignitaries and heads of state. Queen Elizabeth II of the United Kingdom (along with her husband Prince Philip, Duke of Edinburgh) visited and stayed at Government House twice, in her capacity as the then head of state of the Cayman Islands.
