= Athelstan Long =

British colonial administrator (1919–2019)

Athelstan Charles Ethelwulf Long CMG CBE (2 January 1919 – 31 July 2019) was a British colonial administrator. He was commissioned into the Royal Artillery on the 24th February 1940. He was the Administrator, then Governor of the Cayman Islands from 1968 to 1972. He was the son of the writer Marjorie Bowen (pseudonym) and her second husband Arthur Leonard Long.
