= St. Ignatius Catholic School (Cayman Islands) =

Location
- 599 Walkers Road; Grand Cayman; Cayman Islands
- Coordinates: 19°16′38″N 81°23′6″W

Information
- Website: st-ignatius.com

St. Ignatius Catholic School is a private co-educational school in George Town, Grand Cayman, Cayman Islands. St Ignatius is known island-wide for its excellent music department and productions. Founded in 1971 by the Franciscan Missionary Sisters, the school provides a Catholic education to students of all denominations, offering classes from early years through to Year 13. Over the decades, St. Ignatius has expanded significantly in response to the territory's growing population, adding a secondary school and new facilities. The school is known for its academic achievement, community spirit, and resilience, particularly in the aftermath of Hurricane Ivan in 2004. The school was rated "Excellent" by the Cayman Islands Office of Education Standards in 2024.

== Location ==
St. Ignatius Catholic School is located in George Town, the capital of the Cayman Islands, located on Grand Cayman.

== History ==
St. Ignatius Catholic School was founded in 1971 by the Franciscan Missionary Sisters with the goal of providing a Catholic education in a welcoming, supportive environment open to students of all denominations. At its inception, the school served a small student population in a rapidly growing Cayman Islands, which had just over 9,000 residents at the time.

In 1972, the school moved to its current location on Walkers Road in George Town. Over the next two decades, the institution continued to grow, and in 1994 it expanded to include a secondary school, marking a significant development in its academic offerings. That same year, the school introduced a new crest and dedicated Loyola Hall, a central space for school gatherings and activities.

The school celebrated its first Year 11 graduation in 1997, followed by its first Year 13 graduation in 1999, highlighting its full secondary education program. Continued growth in enrollment led to further development of the campus, including a new music and administration block in 2003, funded by philanthropist Susan Olde and her family.

In September 2004, after Hurricane Ivan struck the Cayman Islands, St. Ignatius became the first school on the island to reopen, demonstrating its resilience and commitment to education.

Further expansion took place in 2011 with the addition of a dedicated sixth form area, enhancing the school's post-16 educational provision. As student numbers increased steadily over the years, the school launched plans for a dedicated sports hall in 2019.

By 2023, construction of a new multipurpose hall was completed with the support of the wider school community. The facility was officially dedicated in 2024 as the Monsignor John A. Meaney Multipurpose Hall, named in honor of the long-serving parish priest, with the opening led by Arturo Cepeda, auxiliary bishop of the Archdiocese of Detroit.

In 2024, St. Ignatius Catholic School received a rating of "Excellent" from the Cayman Islands Office of Education Standards, following an official inspection, marking a significant milestone in the school's ongoing pursuit of educational excellence.
