= Frederick Sanguinetti =

British colonial administrator

Frederick Shedden Sanguinetti, ISO (13 September 1847 – 25 October 1906) was a British colonial administrator. After serving as Colonial Secretary of the Falkland Islands from 1890 to 1891, he was the first Commissioner of the Cayman Islands from 1898 to 1906.

Born in Jamaica, the son of the sugar planter Moses Sanguinetti, JP, Frederick Sanguinetti was educated at Cheltenham Grammar School. Joining the civil service in Jamaica in 1863, he was Acting Commissioner of the Turks and Caicos Islands in 1883 and 1884. He was Colonial Secretary of the Falkland Islands from 1890 to 1891.

Appointed Commissioner of the Cayman Islands in 1898, Sanguinetti worked to diversify the economy of the islands, but was met with difficulties. Afflicted with cancer, he returned to England for treatment in 1906, dying in Gloucester soon after his arrival.
