= Thomas Russell (colonial administrator) =

British colonial administrator

Thomas Russell, CMG, CBE (27 May 1920 – 5 July 2016) was a British colonial administrator. He was Governor of the Cayman Islands from 1974 to 1981.

The eldest son of Colonel Thomas Russell OBE MC, Russell was educated at Gattonside School, Melrose Grammar School and Hawick High School, before attending the University of St Andrews, where he graduated MA. Enlisting in the British Army in 1940, he fought in North Africa and Italy, being badly wounded and taken prisoner by the Germans in 1944.

Liberated in 1945, Russell left the Army the following year and was appointed to the Colonial Administrative Service, taking a course in colonial administration at Peterhouse, Cambridge. After postings in Fiji and the Solomon Islands, where he was Chief Secretary, he was appointed Governor of the Cayman Islands in 1974, serving until 1981; his term was extended three times, making him the longest-serving governor of the territory.

Returning to England after his retirement, he was appointed representative of the Cayman Islands government in the United Kingdom in 1982, opening an office in London. Russell died in Scotland in 2016; he was praised by Cayman premier Alden McLaughlin as "by far one of the most respected and favoured governors".

Russell was appointed a Companion of the Order of St Michael and St George (CMG) in the 1980 Birthday Honours
