= Michael Edward John Gore =

British diplomat (1935–2022)

Michael, Edward John Gore CVO CBE

Governor of the Cayman Islands
- In office 14 September 1992 – 16 October 1995
- Monarch: Elizabeth II
- Prime Minister: Sir John Major KG CH
- Preceded by: Alan James Scott, CVO, CBE
- Succeeded by: John Wynne Owen, MBE (later CMG)

Personal details
- Born: 20 September 1935 Kingston on Thames, Surrey, England
- Died: 8 July 2022 (aged 86)

Michael Edward John Gore, CVO, CBE (20 September 1935 – 8 July 2022) was a British diplomat who was Governor of the Cayman Islands from 1992 to 1995.

Gore was noted for his strong interest in environmental conservation and biodiversity and played a key role in securing land for what later became the Governor Michael Gore Bird Sanctuary in the Spotts–Newlands area, now managed by the National Trust for the Cayman Islands.
