= Ritz-Carlton Grand Cayman =

Hotel in Georgetown, Cayman Islands

Coordinates: 19°20′10″N 81°22′47″W

The Ritz-Carlton, Grand Cayman is a luxury hotel in Georgetown, Cayman Islands, operated by the Ritz-Carlton Hotel Company. It lies on Seven Mile Beach. The hotel was nominated for the Caribbean's Leading Hotel Residences and the Caribbean's Leading Hotel Suite in 2013 at the 20th World Travel Awards.

The luxury resort hotel is set in an area of 144 acres that extends from Seven Mile Beach, a stretch of pure white sand along the Caribbean waters, to the North Sound. The hotel comprises two buildings set on either side of the boulevard that runs parallel to the Seven Mile Beach. The link between the two wings is provided by a catwalk which is climatically monitored and is sound proof, and the catwalk runs over the busy thoroughfare. The hotel also encompasses a golf course, designed by Greg Norman.

== Architecture and facilities ==
The Ritz-Carlton, Grand Cayman opened on December 15, 2005. According to Bradt travel guide, the hotel was among the largest buildings on Grand Cayman at the time of its construction. The hotel has 363 rooms and suites and 69 residences.

The Ritz-Carlton consists of two main buildings: the Waterway, which contains the lobby, restaurants, spa and guest rooms opposite the lagoon, and a separate a U-shaped complex of residential suites around a pool and restaurants, facing the ocean. The corridor is long and forms the art gallery, featuring display pedestals showing artifacts made by local craftsman. The main Waterway building contains the hotel lobby and concierge, Silver Palm restaurant and Taikun on the 3rd floor. It also contains the Caribbean's first and only Forbest Travel Guide Five-Star restaurant, Blue by Eric Ripert and five-star Ritz-Carlton Spa, a ballroom, and the "Garden View" and "Resort View" rooms. The lagoon and garden is to the east of The Ritz-Carlton Golf Club — a nine-hole course designed by Greg Norman — and four tennis courts, two hard courts and two with the innovative TitanTrax surface. The 9,000-square-foot (840 m^{2}) ballroom can be divided into three smaller rooms. The terrace adjoining it has further space of 4600 square feet, which can accommodate more guests spilling from the ballroom.

The hotel has 24 residential suites, ranging from one to three bedrooms. The largest and most expensive is the 2,400-square-foot (220 m^{2}) Ritz-Carlton Suite overlooking the ocean, which as of 2006 cost $5,000 a night. The Resort View Club Room, with an area of 480 square feet (45 m^{2}), overlooks the North Sound Pool and has a 75-square-foot (7.0 m^{2}) terrace. Ocean Front Club Room, of the same size, overlooks the beach. Many of the rooms are furnished in Italian linens and marble tables, with rattan chairs on the balconies.
