= Donovan Ebanks =

Cayman diplomat (died 2024)

Donovan Ebanks MBE JP

Acting Governor of the Cayman Islands
- In office 2009–2010

Personal details
- Born: 1952
- Died: 2 June 2024 (aged 71–72)

Donovan Ebanks (1952 – 2 June 2024) was a Cayman diplomat who served as the first Deputy Governor of the Cayman Islands and an acting Governor of the Cayman Islands from 2009 to 2010. He also held the title of "Chief Secretary & Head of the Civil Service". Ebanks was later Chairman of Civil Service Appeals Commission, as well as the Records Management Advisory Committee. He was the Cayman Islands' first Deputy Governor. Ebanks was the Cayman Islands' most senior civil servant at the time of his retirement in 2012. His father was politician Craddock Ebanks.

Ebanks died on 2 June 2024, at the age of 72.
