= Evolution AB =

Online gambling software company

- Type: Public
- Traded as: Nasdaq Stockholm: EVO; OMXS30 component
- Industry: Gambling
- Founded: 2006; 20 years ago
- Founders: Jens von Bahr; Fredrik Österberg
- Headquarters: Stockholm, Sweden
- Area served: Worldwide
- Key people: Martin Carlesund (CEO)
- Revenue: ▲€1.798 billion (2023)
- Operating income: ▲€1.142 billion (2023)
- Net income: ▲€1.070 billion (2023)
- Total assets: ▲€4.973 billion (2023)
- Total equity: ▲€4.006 billion (2023)
- Number of employees: 19,221 (2023)
- Website: evolution.com
- Footnotes; Financials as of 31 December 2023

Evolution AB is a Swedish gaming technology company headquartered in Stockholm. It develops and licenses B2B live casino software for online casino operators.

Evolution AB is a publicly traded company and one of the largest iGaming corporations in the world.

In July 2026, the Gambling Commission revealed that it had considered suspending Evolution's UK operating license after the regulator had discovered "significant anti-money laundering failings."

== History ==
Evolution AB was founded in 2006 by Jens von Bahr and Fredrik Österberg.

In 2013, Evolution launched its 100th live table at the Riga studios, becoming the largest single-site casino operation in Europe, and opened a studio in Spain. A studio in Malta opened in 2014.

Evolution was listed on Nasdaq First North Premier, Stockholm, on March 20, 2015, and subsequently opened a studio in Belgium.

In 2017, Evolution was listed on Nasdaq Nordic and later launched Dream Catcher. In the same year, Martin Carlesund was appointed as the CEO of the company, succeeding Jens von Bahr.

In 2018, Evolution acquired Ezugi and expanded with new facilities in Canada, Georgia, and New Jersey, U.S. It also signed agreements to provide Live Casino services to Unibet as well as Hard Rock Hotel and Casino Atlantic City.

In 2019, Evolution introduced Monopoly Live and Deal or No Deal. The same year, new games such as 2 Hand Casino Hold’em were launched.

In 2020, Evolution entered into an agreement with Intralot and acquired NetEnt, NetEnt Casino, and Red Tiger. Later, it launched Speed Blackjack and Crazy Time, and opened new studios in Pennsylvania, USA, and Lithuania. Additionally, it introduced an online live craps game in the same year.

In 2021, Evolution acquired Digiwheel and Big Time Gaming and later opened its third US studio in Michigan.

In November 2021 a report was filed at the New Jersey Division of Gaming Enforcement (DGE) accusing Evolution of operating in jurisdictions either where online gambling was banned or in countries under international sanctions, including Iran, Syria and Sudan. Evolution denied the accusations and claimed that the report was manufactured by a rival. Senior Executives from Evolution testified before the DGE but no further action followed.

In 2022, Evolution launched XXXtreme Lightning Roulette, went live in West Virginia, and opened its fourth US studio in Connecticut. In the same year, the company acquired Nolimit City, introduced Monopoly Big Baller, and went live on the first day of Ontario's gaming market opening, along with launching its second New Jersey studio.

In 2023, Evolution introduced Funky Time, a 70s disco-themed live game show.

In 2024, Kenneth Dart, a billionaire based in Cayman Islands, acquired a 5 percent stake in Evolution AB.

In 2026, Evolution terminated its planned $85 million acquisition of Galaxy Gaming after a two-year pursuit.

In July 2026, Dart raised his stake in the company to 30.02%, which crossed the threshold that requires the launch of a mandatory takeover offer. The company has four weeks to launch a bid for the remaining shares or reduce its holdings below 30% per Swedish takeover rules.

== Games ==
Evolution AB is known for developing internet games such as Balloon Race and Lightning Storm. One of the most successful game of Evolution is Lightning Roulette which was launched in 2018. It is a live casino game that combines a European Roulette wheel with randomly generated multipliers that increase payouts on specific bets.
