= Truman Bodden =

Caymanian politician

The Honourable Truman Bodden OBE

Leader of Government Business
- In office 26 April 1995 – 8 November 2000
- Monarch: Elizabeth II
- Governor: Michael Edward John Gore; John Wynne Owen; Peter Smith
- Preceded by: Thomas Jefferson
- Succeeded by: Kurt Tibbetts

Member of the Legislative Assembly of the Cayman Islands
- In office November 1976 – November 1984
- In office November 1988 – November 2000
- Constituency: George Town

Personal details
- Occupation: Attorney, Politician

Truman Murray Bodden, OBE (born 22 April 1945) is a former Caymanian politician. An attorney at law by profession, he served as Leader of Government Business from April 1995 to November 2000. He was a member of the Legislative Assembly for George Town. When in government he served in the Ministries of Education, Youth, Finance, Civil Aviation, Employment, Tourism, Environment, Investment and Commerce.

He is a founding member and director of Truman Bodden and Company Attorneys-at-Law, Cayman Islands.

The institution, originally established in 1982 as the Cayman Islands Law School, was later renamed in honour of Truman Bodden.

== Education and career ==
Raised in a close-knit family, Bodden began his career helping in his father’s small shop before earning a Bachelor of Laws (Honours) from the University of London. In 1969, he became the first Caymanian barrister admitted to the Bar of England and Wales. Returning home, he served as Crown Prosecutor, Coroner, and Assistant to the Attorney General, later founding his own law firm, Truman Bodden & Company, and co-founding Cayman National Bank.

Bodden entered politics in 1976, representing George Town in the Legislative Assembly for over two decades. As minister and later Leader of Government Business, he oversaw major developments in health, education, and infrastructure, including the Truman Bodden Law School and the Truman Bodden Sports Complex. His leadership and lifelong dedication to the islands have made him one of the most respected figures in Caymanian public life.

== Health and resignation ==
In May 2023, the local news outlet Cayman Marl Road (CMR) reported that Truman Bodden had resigned as Chairman of Cayman National Corporation Ltd. (CNC) for health-related reasons. According to CMR, witnesses expressed concern about his wellbeing after observing what they described as unusual or erratic behaviour during a visit to the Little Cayman agricultural show around 18 May.

CMR further reported that, several weeks earlier, an incident at a local airport had caused additional concern, with bystanders describing his behaviour as "erratic" and noting that he appeared in attire they regarded as inappropriate while attempting to board a flight from Little Cayman. The outlet also alleged that his family sought a protective court order following reports that he had been distributing money to non-family members and covering large personal expenses for others.

== Personal life ==
Bodden is the father of two children.

| Preceded by Thomas Jefferson | Leader of Government Business; 1995–2000 | Succeeded by Kurt Tibbetts |
