= Dart Foundation =

American charitable organization

- Formation: 1984
- Founder: William A. Dart, Claire T. Dart
- Type: Private foundation
- Legal status: 501(c)(3) organization
- Headquarters: Mason, Michigan
- Website: dartfoundation.org

The Dart Foundation is a private foundation founded in 1984 by William A. Dart and Claire T. Dart in Mason, Michigan. It serves as the United States charitable organization of the Dart Family and related business interests. Since its establishment, the foundation has contributed more than $100 million to nonprofit organizations.

The foundation’s grantmaking focuses on STEM education and community health and services, concentrating its funding in communities where businesses connected to the Dart family are located.

== History ==
The Dart Foundation was created in 1984 to support community programs in Mid-Michigan and later expanded its geographic scope to communities across the United States. Co-founder William A. Dart supported STEM initiatives and Claire T. Dart was active in education and youth services, including volunteer work with Highfields, a Michigan nonprofit serving children and families.

== Activities ==
The Dart Foundation provides grants to organizations for capital projects and program support.

=== Mid-Michigan ===
==== STEM education ====
The Dart Foundation has supported STEM education through grants to schools, science centers, youth programs, and workforce training initiatives. This includes funding for the purchase of 2,500 Chromebooks for Mason Public Schools and updates to facilities for engineering and skilled trades at the Wilson Talent Center in Mason.

Since the 1990s, the Dart Foundation has supported multiple expansions, including renovations, childhood spaces, and traveling exhibits for the Impression 5 Science Center in Lansing.

The Foundation has contributed to Lansing's Potter Park Zoo including support for its Animal Health Facility, a veterinary and educational center that opened in 2025.

Community health and services

The Dart Foundation supports community health and human services organizations. Its involvement has included contributions to healthcare, substance use recovery services, hospice care, youth programs, and assistance for families facing economic hardship, primarily through grants for program support and facility improvements.

A 2010 gift established the William and Claire Dart Stroke Center at the University of Michigan Sparrow Hospital.

The Foundation provided funding for the Boys & Girls Club of Lansing, including creation of the Dart Foundation Café, a commercial kitchen serving daily meals to children, as well as additional contributions for the teen center and gym renovations.

Child & Family Charities in Lansing received funding for program and facility improvements including support for Angel House which provides housing, life skills training, and transitional support for youth in foster care.

The Dart Foundation has contributed more than $2 million to Highfields in Onondaga. A 2018 gift established the Dart Family Treatment and Education Center and a 2025 grant funded facility upgrades and updates to the Jean Schultz Center.

The Foundation supported a 2023 service expansion for individuals with substance use disorders at the Mid-Michigan Recovery Services in Lansing.

==== Arts and culture ====
The Dart Foundation supports arts and cultural organizations in local communities including the Ovation Center for Music and Arts and the REACH Studio Art Center.

=== Other investments ===
Beyond its primary focus areas in Mid-Michigan, the Dart Foundation has provided philanthropic support across the United States.

A 2019 grant helped St. Luke's Magic Valley Medical Center in Twin Falls, Idaho open a new clinic in nearby Buhl.

The Foundation has also supported preservation of historic buildings and development of visitor infrastructure at Horse River Cave in Kentucky, including improvements associated with the restoration and reopening of Hidden River Cave.

Additional support has included funding for the Dart Center for Journalism and Trauma, an academic organization focused on trauma-informed journalism that connected journalists with researchers, clinicians, and victim advocates worldwide.
