= Camana Bay, Cayman Islands =

Town in the Cayman Islands

- Master Planned New Urbanism Community
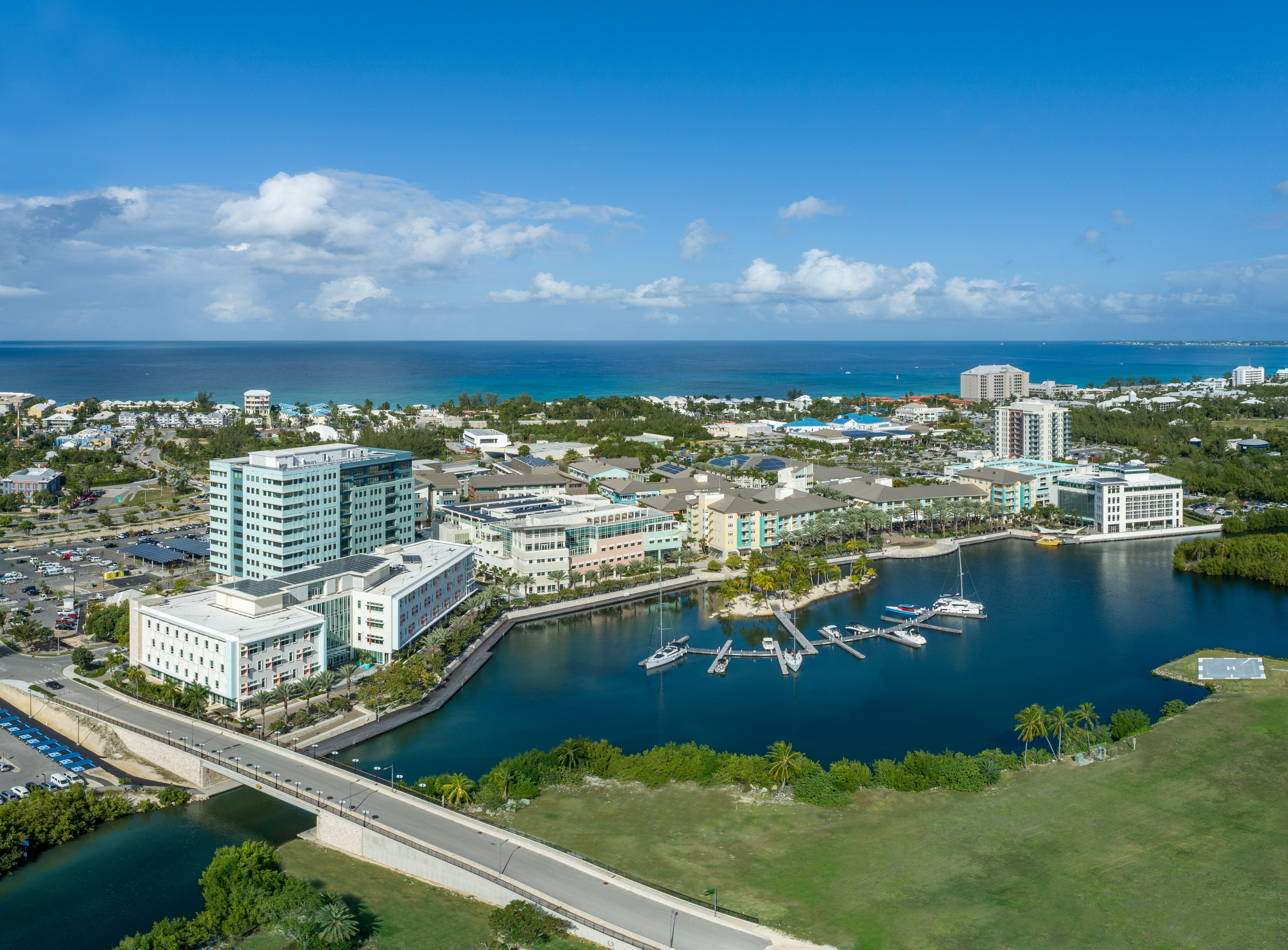
- Country: Cayman Islands
- Overseas Territory: United Kingdom
- Island: Grand Cayman
- Established: 2007

Area
  - Total: 277 ha (685 acres)
- Time zone: EST
- Area code: +1-345

Camana Bay is a master planned waterfront community located near Seven Mile Beach on Grand Cayman, Cayman Islands. Spanning 685 acres the new urbanism development incorporates residential, commercial, educational, and recreational facilities, as well as five courtyards and a 75-foot observation tower that provides views of the island's landscape. The walkable Camana Bay community includes retail stores,restaurants, cafes, cinema, fitness centers, medical facilities, walking trails and a mix of residential options such as apartments, condominiums, townhouses, and duplexes. Camana Bay also includes a harbour and marina offering boat and kayak access to the North Sound area.

== History ==
The concept for Camana Bay began in 1995, led by Cayman Islands-based billionaire businessman and investor Kenneth B. Dart. The initial planning phase lasted approximately ten years and included the cultivation of a plant nursery for the community's landscaping.

Construction of Camana Bay town began in the mid-2000s, with Cayman International School opening in 2006 as the first completed building. The school, a private institution serving nursery through grade 12, expanded in 2015 and again in 2021 through funding from the Kenneth B. Dart Foundation.

The first commercial building in Town, 62 Forum Lane, opened in November 2007, followed by the launch of various retail and entertainment venues. Since its inception, Camana Bay has grown to include a variety of dining, retail, and entertainment establishments.

The development incorporates sustainability features such as solar panels, solar-powered lighting, rainwater cisterns for non-potable uses, LEED-certified air systems, and drought-tolerant landscaping.

In 2018, a residential project known as OLEA was announced. Located south of the town center, OLEA consists of condominiums, townhomes, and duplexes. Additional health infrastructure followed, including a radiotherapy center in 2021 equipped with the region's first Siemens TrueBeam Varian Linear Accelerator, and the 2024 opening of Health City Camana Bay a 70,000-square-foot hospital.

== Accessibility ==
Camana Bay town is accessible by car within approximately 10 minutes from George Town or Owen Roberts International Airport. A pedestrian bridge known as The Rise connects the development with Seven Mile Beach, providing a link from the Caribbean Sea to the North Sound. Boat access available via the Camana Bay Harbour, and a ferry service connects the area to the North Side.

== Recognition ==
In 2010, Camana Bay received Cayman Islands Governor's Award for Design and Construction Excellence. In 2016, 18 Forum Lane received the same award and was recognized as the first commercial building in the Cayman Islands to receive LEED Gold certification.

Several buildings within the Camana Bay community have been recognized with International Property Awards.

In September 2025, Camana Bay was named a finalist for the 2025 Urban Land Institute Southeast Florida/Caribbean Vision Awards – Project of the Year. The nomination highlighted Camana Bay's integrated design of residential, commercial, educational and recreational spaces, with an emphasis on walkability, sustainability, and a Caribbean sense of identity.
