= Cayman International School =

Location
- 95 Minerva Drive; Grand Cayman; Cayman Islands
- Coordinates: 19.3164°N 81.3759°W

Information
- School type: Private/ International
- Opened: October 1994
- Website: caymaninternationalschool.org

Cayman International School (CIS) is a private school offering education from nursery through grade 12, located in Camana Bay, Cayman Islands. The school opened in 2006 and was the first building constructed in the Camana Bay development. CIS is operated by International Schools Services (ISS) and holds accreditation from the Middle States Association of Colleges and Schools in the United States. It is also an International Baccalaureate (IB) World School, offering the IB Diploma Programme.

In addition to its core academic offerings, Cayman International School emphasises STEM education and student engagement in global initiatives. Students participate in international robotics competitions and programs such as LEGO Robotics, the F1 in Schools STEM Challenge, and Girls in STEAM.

== History ==
Faulkner Academy opened in October 1994. ISS purchased the school in 2002, and its name changed to the current one the following year.

The original campus of Cayman International School was established in 2006 through a donation from the William and Claire Dart Foundation. The initial facilities included classrooms, a library, playgrounds, computer labs, an art studio, music rooms, a football pitch, a 25-metre swimming pool, tennis and basketball courts, an amphitheatre, and a multi-purpose hall.

In 2015, the school underwent an expansion that added two primary classrooms, four flexible-use secondary classrooms, two student support centres, and a media room.

Another expansion was announced in 2018, with funding from the Kenneth B. Dart Foundation. This US$60 million project included the construction of an Early Childhood Centre and a three-storey secondary school building with 22 classrooms, including a STEAM (Science, Technology, Engineering, Arts, and Mathematics) lab, four science labs, a technology lab, an art lab, band room, choir room, a black-box theatre, video production room, library, multi-purpose gymnasium, fitness room, faculty offices, open floor spaces, a courtyard, fully-equipped kitchen, and mixed-use classrooms.

== Certifications ==
In 2025, the school became the first international school outside of the United States to earn the National Certificate for STEM Excellence (NCSE) through the National Institute for STEM Education (NISE).
