= Stuart Jack =

British diplomat (1949–2022)

Stuart Duncan Macdonald Jack CVO
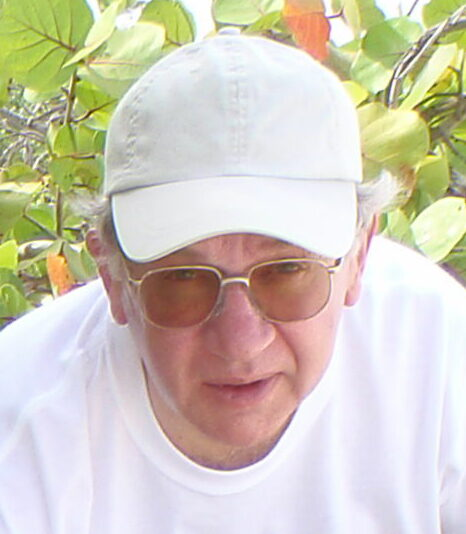

Governor of the Cayman Islands
- In office 2005–2009
- Preceded by: Bruce Dinwiddy
- Succeeded by: Duncan Taylor

Minister, British Embassy, Tokyo
- In office 1999–2003
- Preceded by: Charles Humphrey
- Succeeded by: Martin Hatfull

Director, Research, Foreign and Commonwealth Office
- In office 1996–1999
- Preceded by: Basil Eastwood
- Succeeded by: Richard Lavers

British Consul-General in St. Petersburg
- In office 1992–1995
- Preceded by: Dame Barbara Hay
- Succeeded by: John Guy

Personal details
- Born: June 8, 1949
- Died: February 16, 2022 (aged 72)
- Education: Westcliff High School for Boys; Merton College, Oxford
- Occupation: Diplomat

Stuart Duncan Macdonald Jack CVO (8 June 1949 – 16 February 2022) was a British diplomat, latterly serving as the Governor of the Cayman Islands from 2005 until 2009.

== Education ==
Educated at Westcliff High School for Boys; and then Merton College, Oxford.

== Career ==
Jack joined the Foreign and Commonwealth Office in 1972 after serving with the VSO in the Kingdom of Laos. After joining the Eastern European and Soviet Department, Jack took posts in Tokyo and Moscow. He went on secondment to the Bank of England from 1984 to 1985, and then returning to Tokyo for another four-year posting.

In 1989, Jack served as the FCO's Diplomatic Service Inspector, before being posted to St. Petersburg as Consul-General from 1992 to 1995. He then served as Head of the FCO's Research Analysts cadre from 1996 to 1999, returning to Tokyo as Minister. After a brief spell back in the office in 2003–2004, Jack took his last posting as Governor of the Cayman Islands in 2005, retiring in 2009.

Jack was appointed a Commander of the Royal Victorian Order (C.V.O.) in 1994 after the Queen's State Visit to St. Petersburg.

== Scouting ==
Jack was Chief Scout of The Scout Association of the Cayman Islands from October 2006. In his youth, he was involved in Scouting, including time as a Cub Scout.

== Offices held ==
Diplomatic posts
Preceded by Dame Barbara Hay	British Consul-General in St. Petersburg; 1992-1995	Succeeded by John Guy
Preceded by Basil Eastwood	Director, Research of the Foreign and Commonwealth Office; 1996-1999	Succeeded by Richard Lavers
Preceded by Charles Humfrey	Minister, British Embassy in Tokyo; 1999-2003	Succeeded by Martin Hatfull
Preceded by Bruce Dinwiddy	Governor of the Cayman Islands; 2005-2009	Succeeded by Duncan Taylor

== Death ==
Jack died on 16 February 2022, at the age of 72. A statement was issued by the then Governor Martyn Roper on the 21 February 2022.
