= Seven Mile Beach, Grand Cayman =

Beach and settlement on Grand Cayman, Cayman Islands

Coordinates: 19.3428°N 81.3917°W

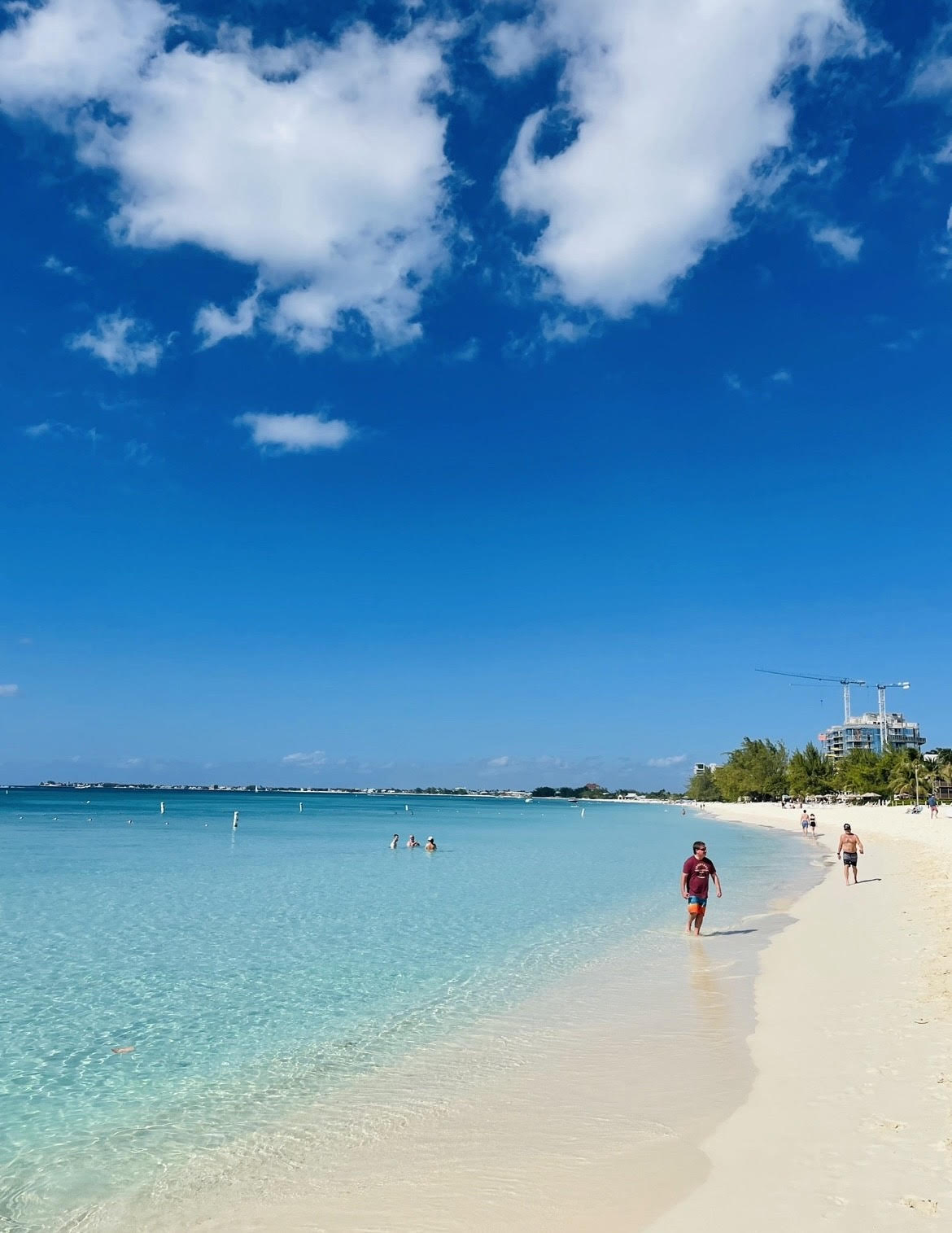
Northern Seven Mile Beach, Grand Cayman.

Seven Mile Beach (SMB) is a long crescent of coral-sand beach on the western end of Grand Cayman island. Seven Mile Beach is known for its beauty, receiving the honor of "The Caribbean's Best Beach" in 2015 from Caribbean Travel and Life Magazine. It is public property and one is able to walk the full length of the beach, regardless of where they are staying. The Seven Mile Beach is the most popular and most developed area of Grand Cayman. It is home to the majority of the island's luxury resorts and hotels.

Despite the name, a generous measurement puts the actual length at just a bit over 6.3 miles (10.1 km) long. A realistic length for the uninterrupted sandy beach is about 6 miles. The beach falls victim to annual erosion, which has reduced its size in some areas, and may have reduced its length at the ends. After Hurricane Helene in 2024, erosion along the beach became much worse, with hardly any sand left in some places. In August of 2025, the Grand Cayman Marriott announced a plan to bring 8,000 cubic yards of sand back to the shoreline and replenish the eroded beach.

== Amenities ==
Restaurants open to the public can be found at most of the resorts, which includes several public beach bars. Some small reefs are located just off shore which offer good snorkelling, most notably by the Marriott hotel (an artificial reef), Government House (the Governor's residence), and just north of Seven Mile Public beach.

Directly to the south of Seven Mile Beach is George Town, the capital city of the Cayman Islands and where the tourists come in, while to the north is the district of West Bay, which features a turtle farm and the limestone formations of Hell. Right across from Seven Mile Beach, is Camana Bay, a small town that also acts as a large shopping and office park. There are many amenities, with restaurants, cafés, and a cinema.

== Recognition ==
Seven Mile Beach was recognized in the 2025 list of World's 50 Best Beaches. In 2024, Seven Mile Beach was named runner-up for Best Caribbean beach by USA Today.
