= Lowe Enterprises =

American real estate investment company

Lowe
- Type: Privately held company
- Industry: Real estate investment, development and management - Commercial office, mixed use, multifamily, hospitality and retail redevelopment
- Founded: 1972; 54 years ago
- Headquarters: Los Angeles, California, U.S.
- Key people: Robert J. Lowe, Sr., Chairman of the Board and Chief Executive Officer; Michael H. Lowe, Co-CEO; Robert J. Lowe, Jr., Co-CEO
- Number of employees: 80
- Website: loweenterprises.com

Lowe is a real estate investment firm based in Los Angeles. Since its founding, the company has acquired, constructed, or managed more than $21 billion in real estate assets. Its subsidiary, Destination by Hyatt, was the third largest hospitality management company in the United States in 2013.

== History ==
Lowe was founded in Los Angeles, California in 1972 by Robert J. Lowe, Sr. and three business partners as a diversified real estate investment, management, and development firm. Since its inception, it has developed, managed or acquired $32 billion in assets. In the early 1970s, Lowe formed Destination Hotels & Resorts to manage hotels and resorts it developed. In the 1980s, the company branched out into "distressed properties", ones whose financial backers were having trouble meeting debt and operating payments.

In 1990, the firm expanded into investment management, forming Lowe Enterprises Investment Management, an SEC registered investment advisor.

As a privately held company, Lowe Enterprises does not report its revenues or profits. However, in 2000, Robert J. Lowe, Sr. told the The Baltimore Sun that the company had "record earnings" in 1997, 1998, and 1999. Lowe also claimed that institutional investors tended to see a return of 20 percent to 25 percent in the 1990s.

In 2002, the National Association of Industrial and Office Parks (NAIOP) named Lowe Enterprises its Developer of the Year.

By 2009, the company had expanded into managing properties for wealthy investors and corporations, and its Lowe Enterprises Investors (formerly LEIM) subsidiary had more than $4 billion in assets under management. Overall, Lowe Enterprises had about 150 employees nationwide that same year. Lowe's sons, Robert Lowe, Jr. and Michael Lowe, joined the firm.

Lowe debuted its 102-acre Terranea Resort at the site of the former MarineLand theme park in Rancho Palos Verdes on the Southern California Coast in 2009. The failure of Corus Bank, the construction lender for the resort, left Terranea in challenging financial condition for its first year of operation. Refinancing in 2010 put the resort on firm financial footing and it has become a popular destination for weddings and conferences along with vacationing guests.

In July 2010, The Guardian Life Insurance Company of America took a "substantial" but non-controlling interest in Lowe Enterprises Investors. The insurance company also agreed to provide Lowe Enterprises with $200 million for investment purposes. Lowe said it would seek to purchase or invest in distressed or undervalued properties in the hotel, industrial, office, and retail sectors. In 2018, Lowe sold its interest in Lowe Enterprises Investors to Guardian and LEI senior executives and LEI rebranded. Lowe continues its own investment activities with joint venture partners.

In 2016, Destination Hotels merged with Commune Hotels & Resorts to form Two Roads Hospitality in partnership with GEOLO Capital, doubling the size of Lowe's hotel and resort portfolio. In late 2018, Lowe and its partner sold Two Roads Hospitality to Hyatt Hotels Corporation for more than $450 million. Lowe also sold its interest in Lowe Enterprises Investors to its partner, The Guardian Life Insurance Company of America.

== Corporate structure ==
Lowe Enterprises generates some funds of its own for real estate investment. However, most of its financing comes from a wide range of sources, such as government entities, real estate investment trusts, other real estate development companies, and institutional investors such as hedge funds and pension funds. The company prefers to rely on a wide range of financial sources to reduce risk. The company tends to invest in large projects with a view to retaining or managing the property in the long term.
