= Bruce Dinwiddy =

British diplomat (1946–2021)

Bruce Harry Dinwiddy CMG

Governor of the Cayman Islands
- In office May 2002 – October 2005
- Monarch: Elizabeth II
- Preceded by: Peter Smith
- Succeeded by: Stuart Jack

Personal details
- Born: February 1, 1946 Epsom, Surrey, England
- Died: April 1, 2021 (aged 75)
- Spouse: Emma Victoria Llewellyn
- Children: 2
- Occupation: Diplomat

Bruce Harry Dinwiddy, CMG (1 February 1946, Epsom – 1 April 2021) was a British diplomat and colonial administrator who served as Governor of the Cayman Islands from 2002 to 2005. Over a Foreign and Commonwealth Office (FCO) career spanning more than three decades, he held senior postings in Europe, Africa, the Middle East, and North America, including appointments as Deputy High Commissioner to Canada, High Commissioner to Tanzania, and non-resident Commissioner of the British Indian Ocean Territory.

== Career ==
After joining the Foreign and Commonwealth Office in 1973, Dinwiddy embarked on a diplomatic career spanning more than three decades, during which he held a wide range of overseas and London-based postings. His early assignments included work in the Central and Southern African Department (1973–1974) and a posting to the UK Mission to the CSCE in Geneva as Second Secretary in 1974.

He later served in the Hong Kong and Indian Ocean Department (1974–1975) before moving to Vienna as First Secretary to the UK Delegation to the MBFR negotiations (1975–1977).

Between 1977 and 1981, Dinwiddy worked in the Permanent Under Secretary's Department at the FCO, followed by a posting to Cairo as Head of Chancery from 1981 to 1983. He then returned to London to serve in the Personnel Operations Department (1983–1984) and as Assistant Head of the Personnel Policy Department (1985–1986). From 1986 to 1988, he was seconded to the Cabinet Office as a counsellor, after which he undertook a career development attachment at the Stiftung Wissenschaft und Politik in Ebenhausen in 1989.

Later that year, he was appointed Counsellor at the British Embassy in Bonn, serving until 1991. He subsequently became Deputy High Commissioner in Ottawa (1992–1995), before returning to the FCO as Head of the Southern African Department and, concurrently, non-resident Commissioner of the British Indian Ocean Territory from 1996 to 1998. Dinwiddy then served as High Commissioner in Dar es Salaam from 1998 to 2001.

After a brief secondment to Standard Chartered Bank (2001–2002), he was appointed Governor of the Cayman Islands and President of the Executive Council, a position he held from 2002 to 2005.

== Personal life ==
He was married to Emma Victoria (née Llewellyn) and has one daughter (b. 1976) and one son (b. 1979).

== Death ==
He died on 1 April 2021 at the age of 75.
