= Peter Smith (diplomat) =

British diplomat (born 1942)

Peter Smith CBE
- Born: 15 May 1942 (age 84)
- Occupation: Diplomat

Peter John Smith, CBE (born 15 May 1942) is a retired British diplomat who was the British ambassador to Madagascar, the British High Commissioner to Lesotho and in his final position was Governor of the Cayman Islands. He held this position from May 1999 until retirement in May 2002.
