= Arden McLean =

Politician from the Cayman Islands

Arden McLean is a politician from the Cayman Islands.

== Biography ==
After attending the Cayman Islands High School, McLean studied at the Seaman's Church Institute in New York.

McLean worked for 18 years at Caribbean Utilities in various capacities, including management. In 2000, he joined the Legislative Assembly and was the Minister of Communications, Works, and Infrastructure from 2005 to 2009. In 2019, McLean was appointed Leader of the Opposition by Governor Martyn Roper.

In February 2025, he became a member of the National Conservation Council.
