= Thomas Jefferson (Caymanian politician) =

Cayman Islands politician (1941–2006)

The Honourable Thomas Jefferson OBE

Leader of Government Business
- In office 25 November 1992 – 26 April 1995
- Monarch: Elizabeth II
- Governor: Michael Edward John Gore
- Succeeded by: Truman Bodden

Member of the Legislative Assembly of the Cayman Islands
- In office November 1992 – November 2000
- Constituency: West Bay

Personal details
- Born: 13 April 1941 Grand Cayman, Cayman Islands
- Died: 29 October 2006 (aged 65) Miami, Florida, U.S.
- Party: Independent
- Education: Vanderbilt University
- Occupation: Politician

Thomas Carrol Jefferson, OBE (13 April 1941 – 29 October 2006) was a Caymanian politician. He was the first Leader of Government Business in the Cayman Islands, serving from 1992 to 1995.

Jefferson whose public positions included Minister, the first Elected Member to be Leader of Government Business, ExCo Member, MLA (West Bay) and Financial Secretary of the Cayman Islands.

In December 1997, an Atlantis Events cruise on Norwegian Cruise Line's MS Leeward was denied permission make a planned February 1998 stop at Grand Cayman. Thomas C. Jefferson wrote to the cruise line that the cruise's passengers would not "uphold the standards of appropriate behavior expected of visitors". The ship docked in Belize instead.

Jefferson received a Master of Arts degree from Vanderbilt University in 1975.

New title	Leader of Government Business; 1992–1995	Succeeded by Truman Bodden
