= Norway–United Kingdom relations =

- Norway: United Kingdom

Diplomatic mission
- Embassy of Norway, London: Embassy of the United Kingdom, Oslo

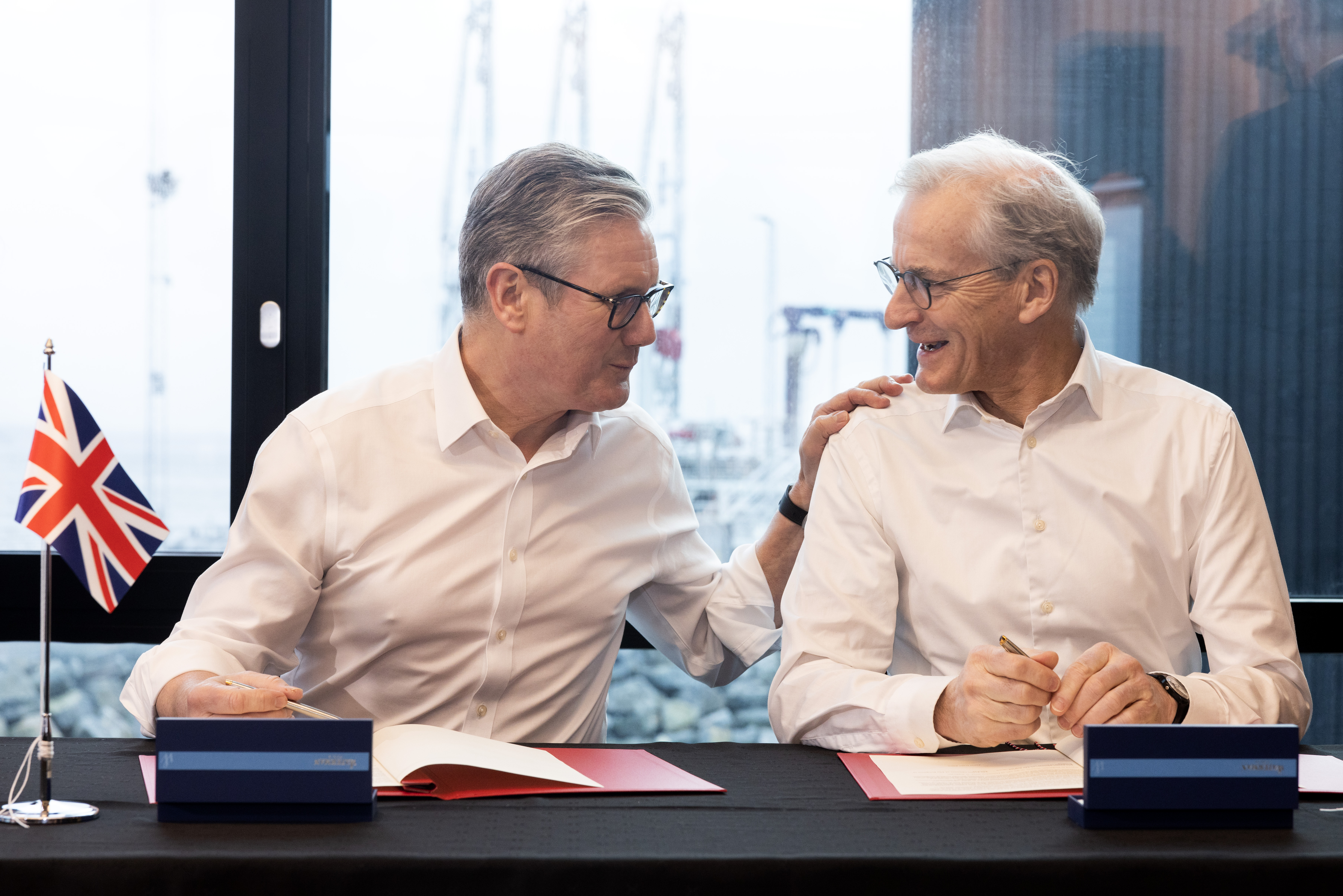
British Prime Minister Keir Starmer with Norwegian Prime Minister Jonas Gahr Støre in Bergen, December 2024.

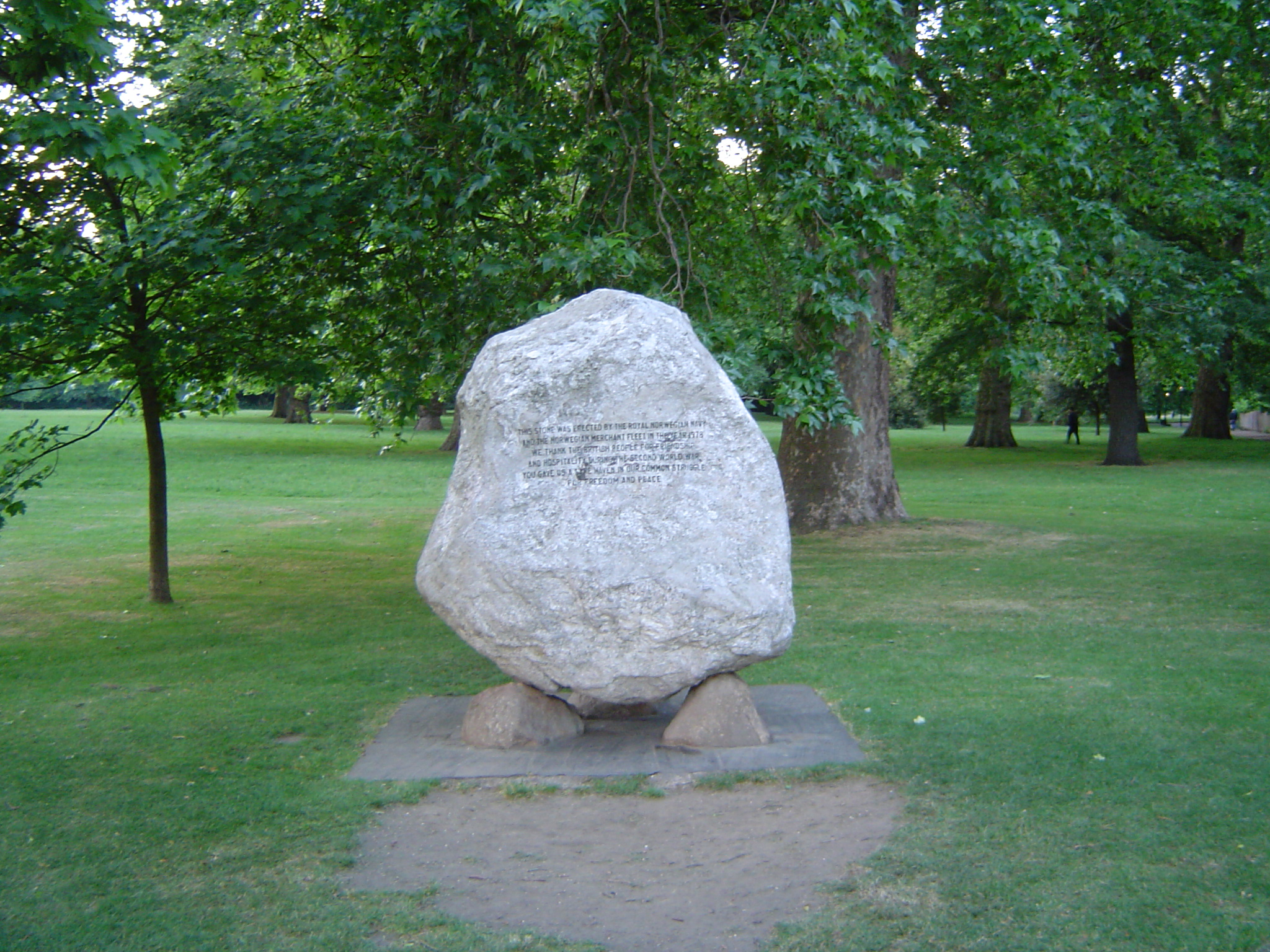
The Norwegian stone in Hyde Park, London

The Kingdom of Norway and the United Kingdom maintain diplomatic, economic, and historical ties. Both countries established diplomatic relations on 6 November 1905.

Both countries share common membership of the Atlantic Co-operation Pact, the Council of Europe, the International Criminal Court, the Joint Expeditionary Force, NATO, the OECD, the OSCE, the United Nations, and the World Trade Organization. Bilaterally the two countries have a Free Trade Agreement, a Green Partnership, and a Strategic Partnership Agreement.

== History ==
=== Historical connections ===
The Norse-Gaelic Kingdom of the Isles in the 12th century

Vikings of Norwegian stock particularly settled in certain areas of modern-day Scotland and Northern England, and to this day many people in these areas carry surnames derived from Old Norse words, such as Ainscough, or are of partial Norwegian descent.

In England, Norwegian Vikings began to arrive along the coast of the North West after being driven out of Ireland around the early tenth century. They are principally known for settling in The Wirral and Chester, but evidence has strongly suggested that this expulsion also led to some settling in nearby West Derby Hundred (today split between Greater Manchester and Merseyside), Amounderness Hundred and Lonsdale Hundred in Lancashire. The Vikings were able to settle comfortably in these areas, as they were sparsely populated at that time. Many place names in this area, such as North Meols, Scholes, Skelmersdale and Grimsargh are of Old Norse origin, as are certain words in Lancashire dialect from this area, such as "skrike". The Cuerdale Hoard and Silverdale Hoard were both discovered within this area. Around the same time, Norwegian Vikings moved on to settle in the area that today is Cumbria.

In Scotland, the islands of Shetland and Orkney have longstanding historical and cultural connections with Norway. Most natives of Orkney and Shetland probably spoke Norn (North Germanic language related to dialects in Norway) as a first language until the late 16th and early- to mid-17th centuries, respectively.

=== 1900s ===
Both countries established diplomatic relations in 1905, after Norwegian independence from Sweden. The UK has an embassy in Oslo, and Norway has an embassy in London. Relations, however, go as far back as the Viking Age when Norse Vikings raided the British Isles, founding permanent settlements in the west of England, the Isle of Man, the Hebrides in Scotland and the islands of Orkney and Shetland. As a result, the English language has been greatly influenced by the Norwegian language. This cultural bond has persisted to this day, resulting in a close cultural relationship between the two countries.

With Norway's complete independence from Sweden, the question arose as to a king for Norway. The choice of Prince Carl of Denmark, who became King Haakon VII, was largely seen as being influenced by two unusual factors: Denmark being a smaller nation meant that the Balance of Power in Europe would not be upset by Norway's instant alliance with the native land of its new king, and Carl's wife, Maud, was a British princess, which would be expected to lead to a close relationship with the United Kingdom, which could give Norway some protection from German hegemony.

During World War I, Norway was neutral. However, due to largely favouring the British over the Germans, Norway came to be known as The Neutral Ally.

=== World War II ===
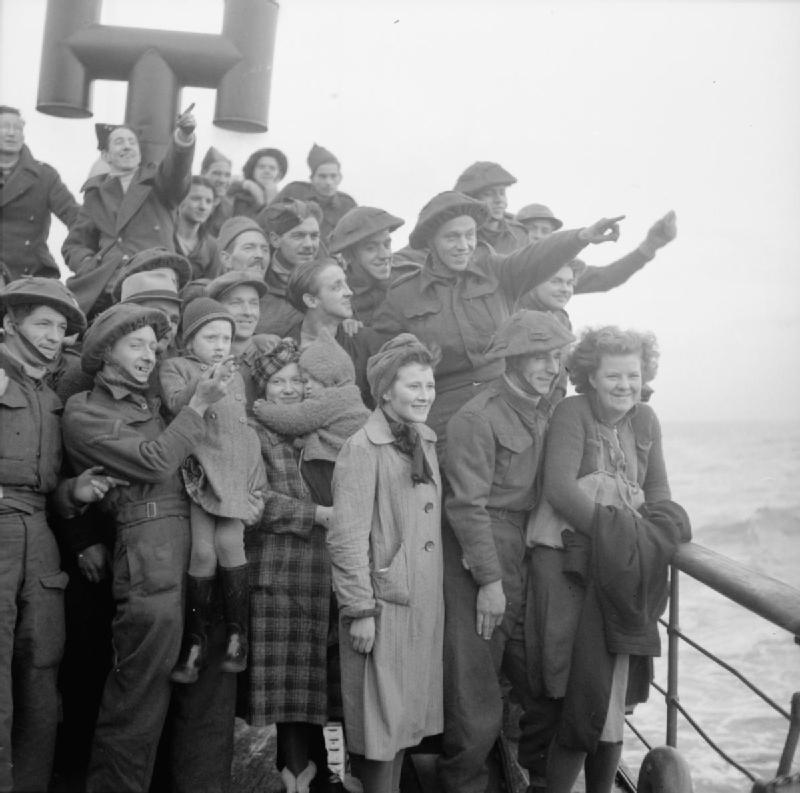
British troops with Norwegian civilians after the Måløy Raid on 27 December 1941

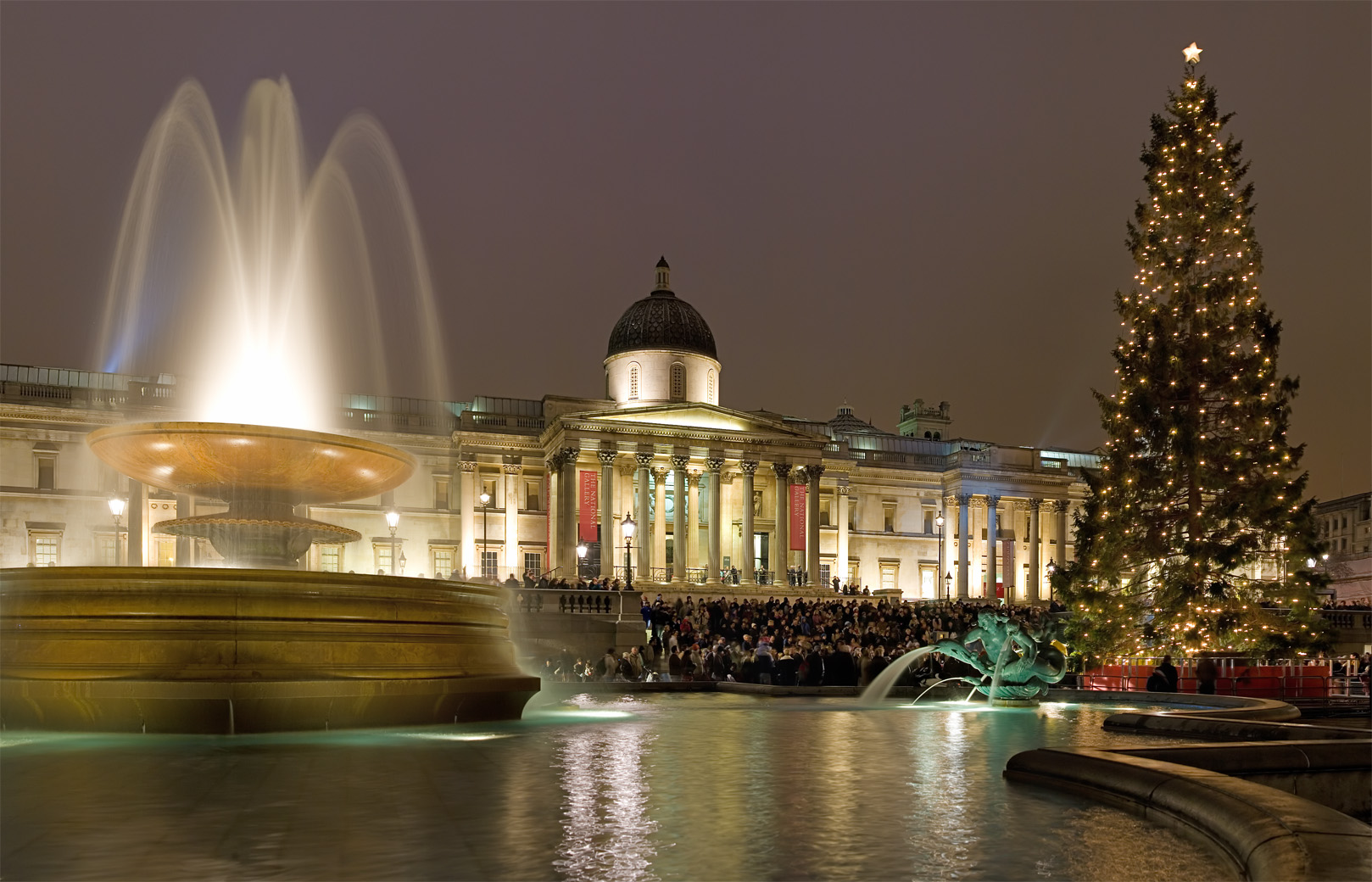
The Trafalgar Square Christmas tree is donated to the people of London by the city of Oslo each year since 1947

During World War II, Norway was invaded and occupied by Germany, forcing the Norwegian king and government to create a government-in-exile in London. The British military also helped train and organise Norwegian commandos to attack Nazi installations in Norway. As a token of appreciation from the Norwegian people to the people of Britain, a Norwegian Christmas Tree is sent every year from Oslo to Trafalgar Square in London.

As part of a decades-long tradition, each year, Newcastle upon Tyne receives a Christmas tree as a gift from the people of Bergen, one of Newcastle's twin cities. The tree, a Norwegian spruce, is decorated white lights.

Norway has also sent a tree to the town of Great Grimsby every Christmas since the end of World War II. In more recent years, the tree has been selected by the people of Sortland.

=== Brexit ===
In January 2020, with the imminent departure of Britain from the European Union, Norway and the UK signed an exclusive Brexit agreement between the two countries that would aim to maintain existing guarantees for citizens of either.

In April 2021, negotiations on a bilateral agreement on fishing rights failed to reach an agreement.

In June 2021, the two countries signed a trade deal.

== Modern relations ==
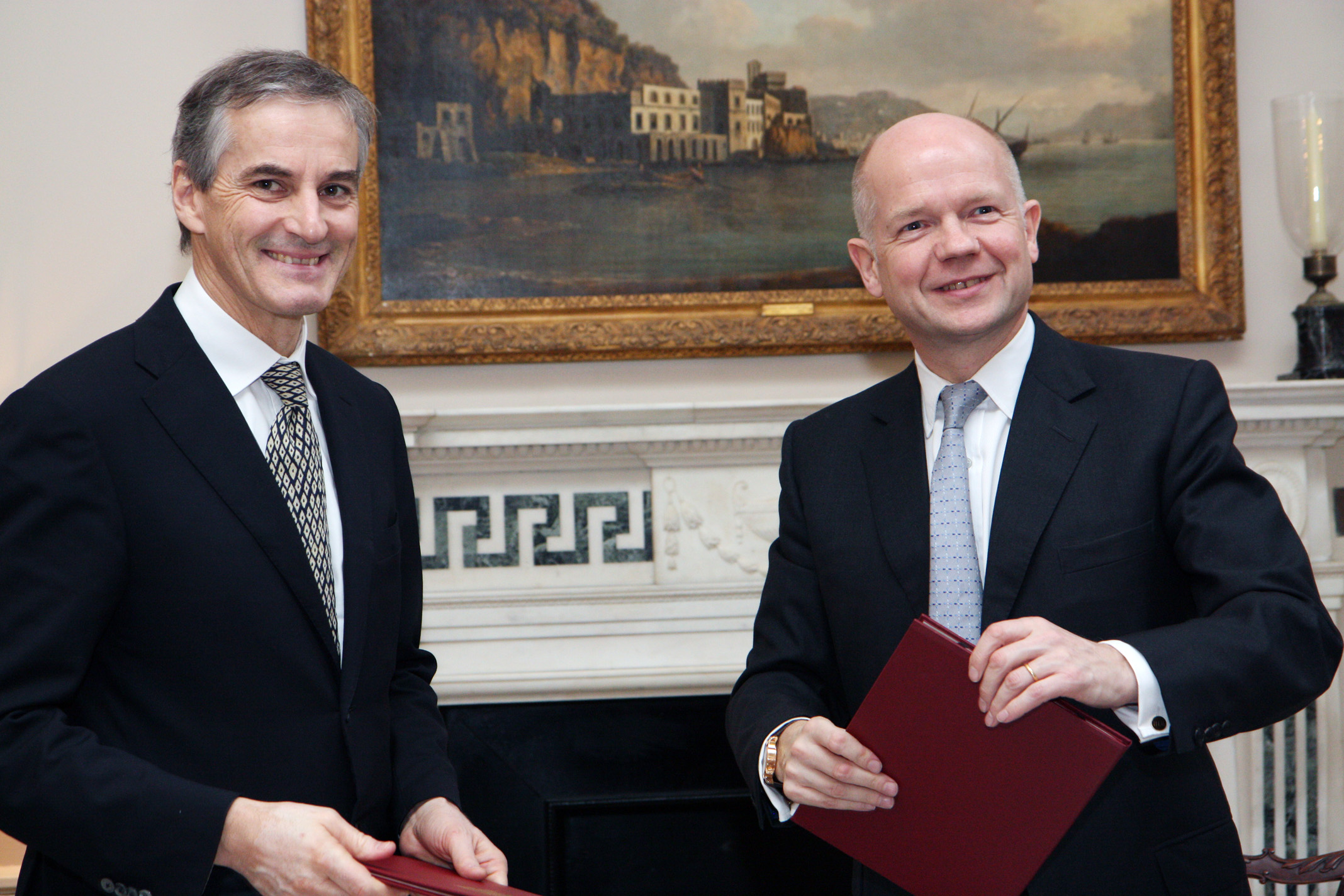
British Foreign Secretary William Hague (right) and Norwegian Foreign Minister Jonas Gahr Støre sign a Memorandum of Understanding on UK-Norway co-operation on polar research and cultural heritage in London, England, on 30 November 2011.

After the English town of Harwich was badly affected by the North Sea Flood of 1953, in which several people were made homeless, the Norwegian Government responded by funding the building of some wooden houses in the town. Despite being considered temporary, the houses still stand in Harwich today.

Norway and the United Kingdom share mutual border boundary lines in Antarctica, and mutually recognise each other's claims as well as those of Australia, France and New Zealand.

Both countries are full members of NATO and of the Council of Europe. There are around 18,000 Norwegians living in the United Kingdom and around 13,395 British people living in Norway. British people are one of the largest immigrant groups in many cities. The cities with the most Britons are Oslo (2,535), Stavanger (1,542), Bergen (1,014), Bærum (716), Trondheim (360), Asker (307), Kristiansand (238), Drammen (144) and Fredrikstad (111).

Queen Elizabeth II made three state visits to Norway during her reign, in 1955, 1981 and 2001, being received by kings Haakon VII, Olav V and Harald V respectively.

== Economic relations ==
On 4 January 1960, Norway and the United Kingdom became founding members of the European Free Trade Association (EFTA); the UK left the EFTA to join the European Economic Community (EEC) on 31 December 1972.

From 1 July 1973 until 30 December 2020 trade between Norway and the UK was governed by the European Union–Norway Trade Agreement, and through the European single market through the European Economic Area from 1 January 1994, while the United Kingdom was a member of the European Union.

Following the withdrawal of the United Kingdom from the European Union, Iceland, Norway and the United Kingdom signed the Iceland–Norway–United Kingdom Trade Agreement on 8 December 2020. The Iceland–Norway–United Kingdom Trade Agreement was a continuity trade agreement, based on the EU free trade agreement, which entered into force on 1 January 2021 however was superseded by a modernised agreement.

On 8 July 2021, Iceland, Liechtenstein, Norway and the United Kingdom signed a modernised free trade agreement; the agreement expanded to cover services in addition to goods. Trade value between Iceland–Norway and the United Kingdom was worth £56,325 million in 2022.

In June 2025, UK energy firm Centrica announced a £20 billion deal to import gas from Norwegian energy giant Equinor until 2035, deepening UK-Norway energy ties.

== Military relations ==
The Royal Marines train annually in Norway, and are integrated into Norway's defence plans. In March 2023, the UK opened a new military base in Norway, named Camp Viking. In August 2024, Norwegian Defence Secretary Bjørn Arild Gram described the UK as Norway's "closest and most important European Ally" and pledged two ships to join the UK Carrier Strike Group during its Pacific deployment in 2025.

In December 2024, Prime Minister Jonas Gahr Støre and Prime Minister Keir Starmer signed a Strategic Partnership between the two countries.

Analyst and journalist Anthony Heron proposed that the UK and Norway should be central to the creation of a North Sea Defence Alliance (NSDA), aimed at enhancing regional security through closer defence collaboration. The two countries are part of the UK-led Joint Expeditionary Force, formed in 2018 with eight other Northern European nations, to respond to emerging crises in Northern Europe.

Recently, the two have collaborated extensively to provide intelligence and arms to Ukraine during Russia's invasion of that country in 2022.

On August, 2025, the UK signed a £10bn deal with Norway, to supply the Norwegian navy with at least five Type‑26 anti submarine warfare frigates. According to the Ministry of Defence, the deal marks Britain's "biggest ever warship export deal by value". In December 2025, the two countries sign a defense pact designed to operate a combined fleet for hunting Russian submarines. This deal comes following a 30% increase in Russian vessels roaming UK water in the past two years.

== Diplomatic missions ==
- Norway maintains an embassy in London, and an honorary consulate general in Edinburgh.
- The United Kingdom is accredited to Norway through its embassy in Oslo.

== Twinnings ==
- (England) Alnwick, Northumberland and (Norway) Time, Rogaland
- (Scotland) Aberdeen, Aberdeenshire and (Norway) Stavanger, Rogaland
- (England) Barnstaple, Devon and (Norway) Harstad, Troms
- (Scotland) Burntisland, Fife and (Norway) Flekkefjord, Agder
- (Scotland) Dunfermline, Fife and (Norway) Trondheim, Trøndelag
- Lerwick, Shetland and (Norway) Måløy, Vestland
- (England) Letchworth Garden City, Hertfordshire and (Norway) Kristiansand, Agder
- (England) Newcastle, Tyne and Wear and (Norway) Bergen, Vestland
- Orkney and (Norway) Hordaland county
- (Scotland) Peterhead, Aberdeenshire and (Norway) Ålesund, Møre og Romsdal

== Gallery ==
Gallery

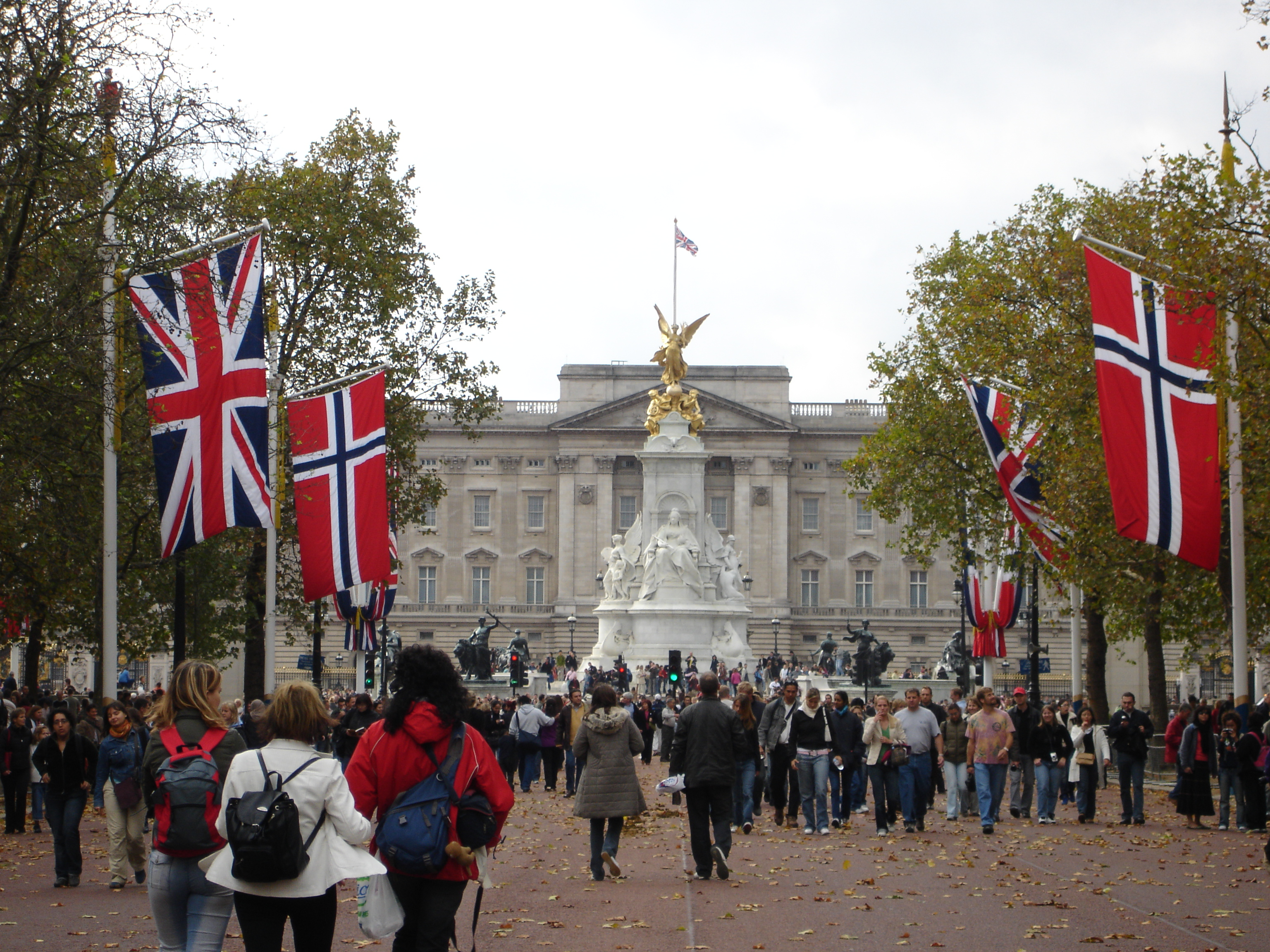
The Norwegian and British flags outside Buckingham Palace

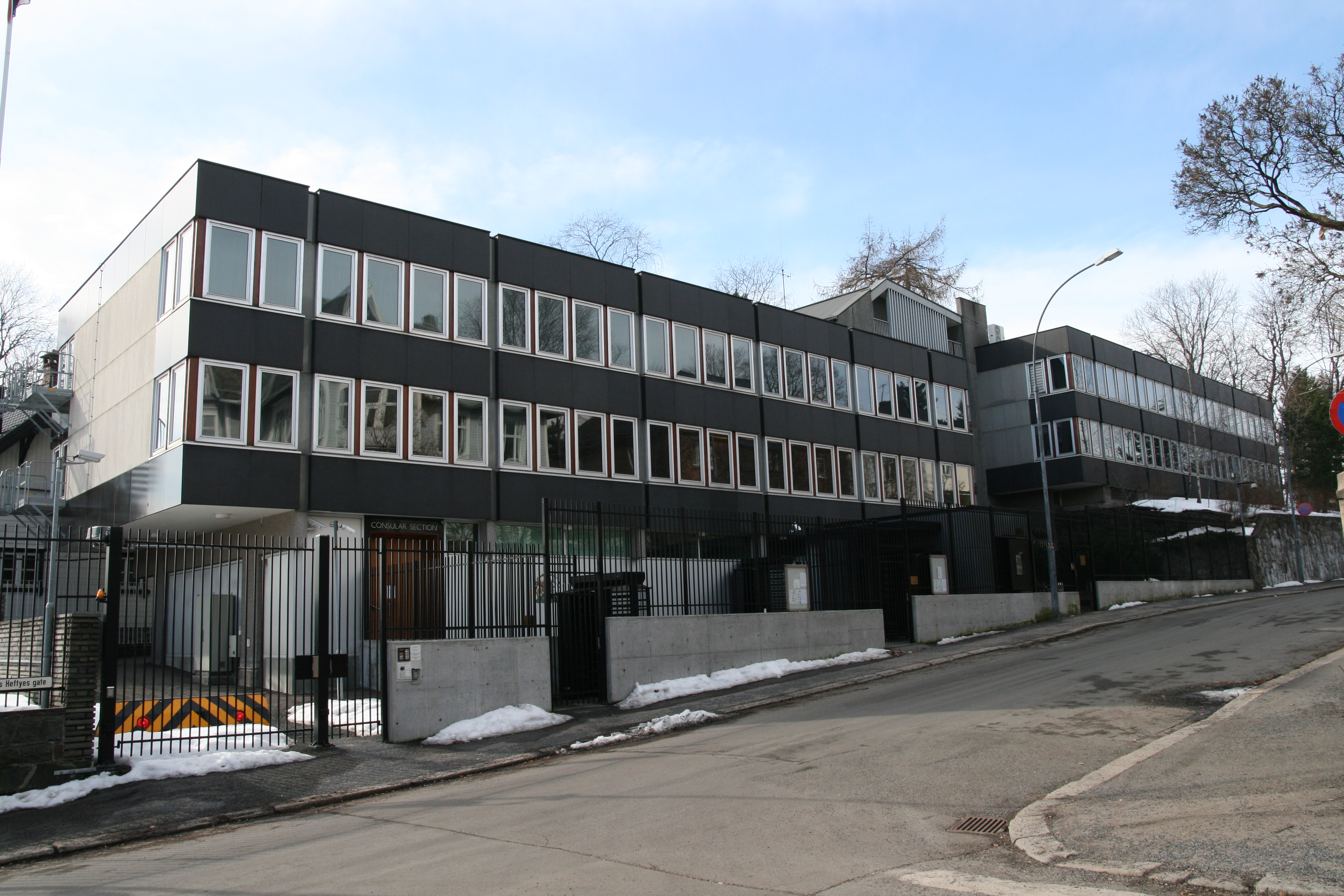
The British embassy in Oslo

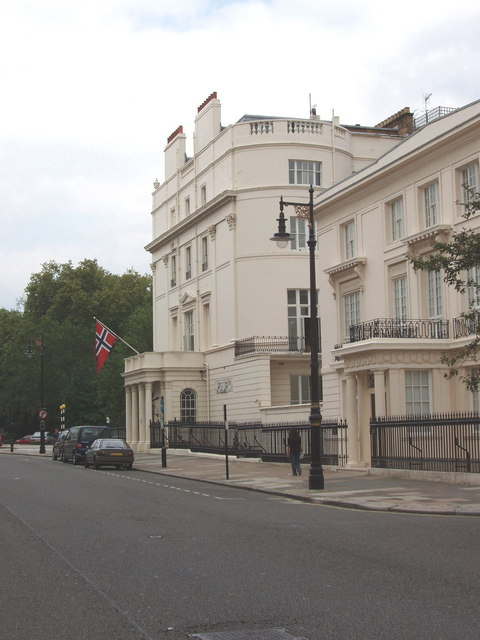
Embassy of Norway in London.

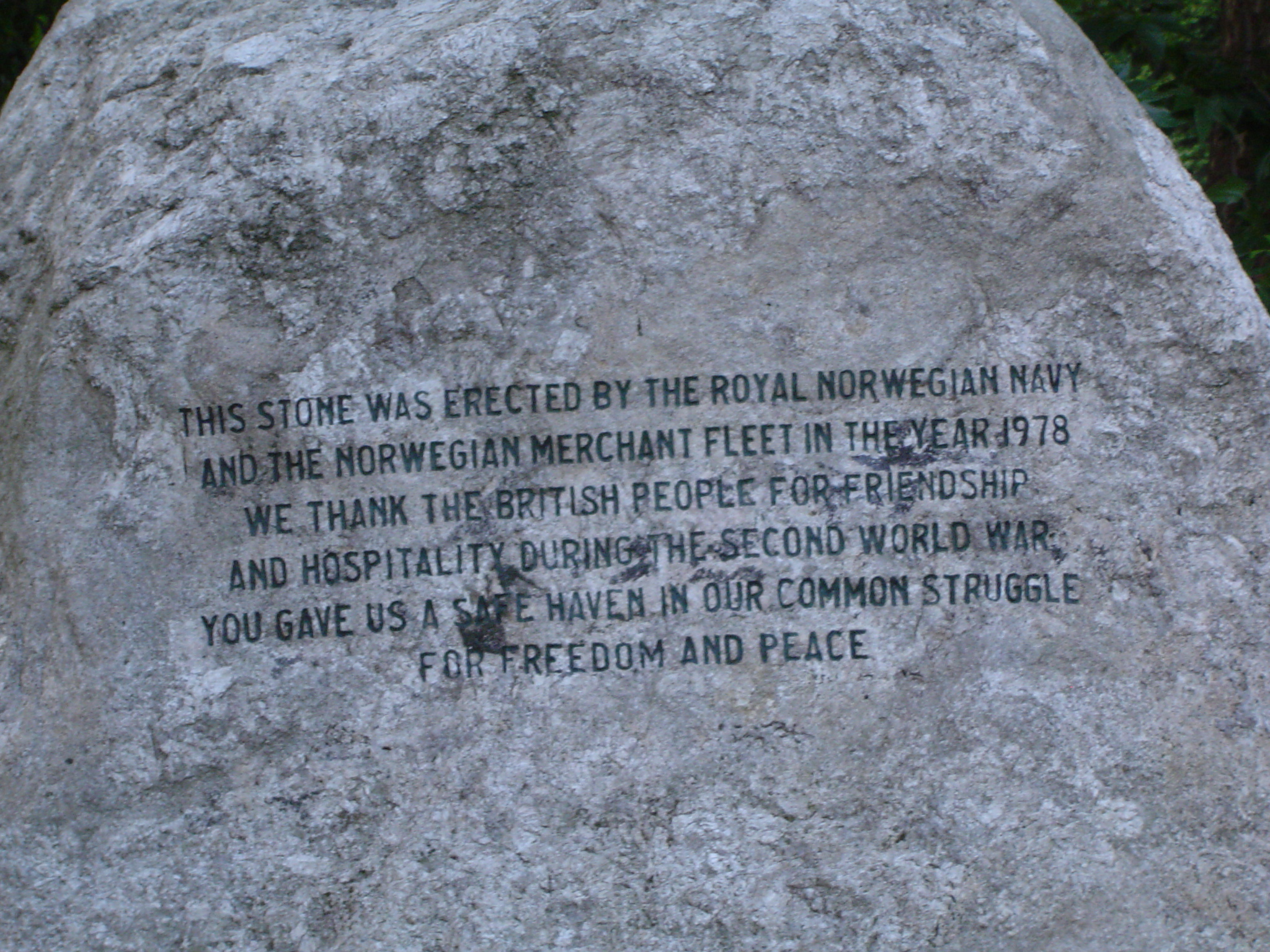
A nearer picture of the Norwegian stone in Hyde Park

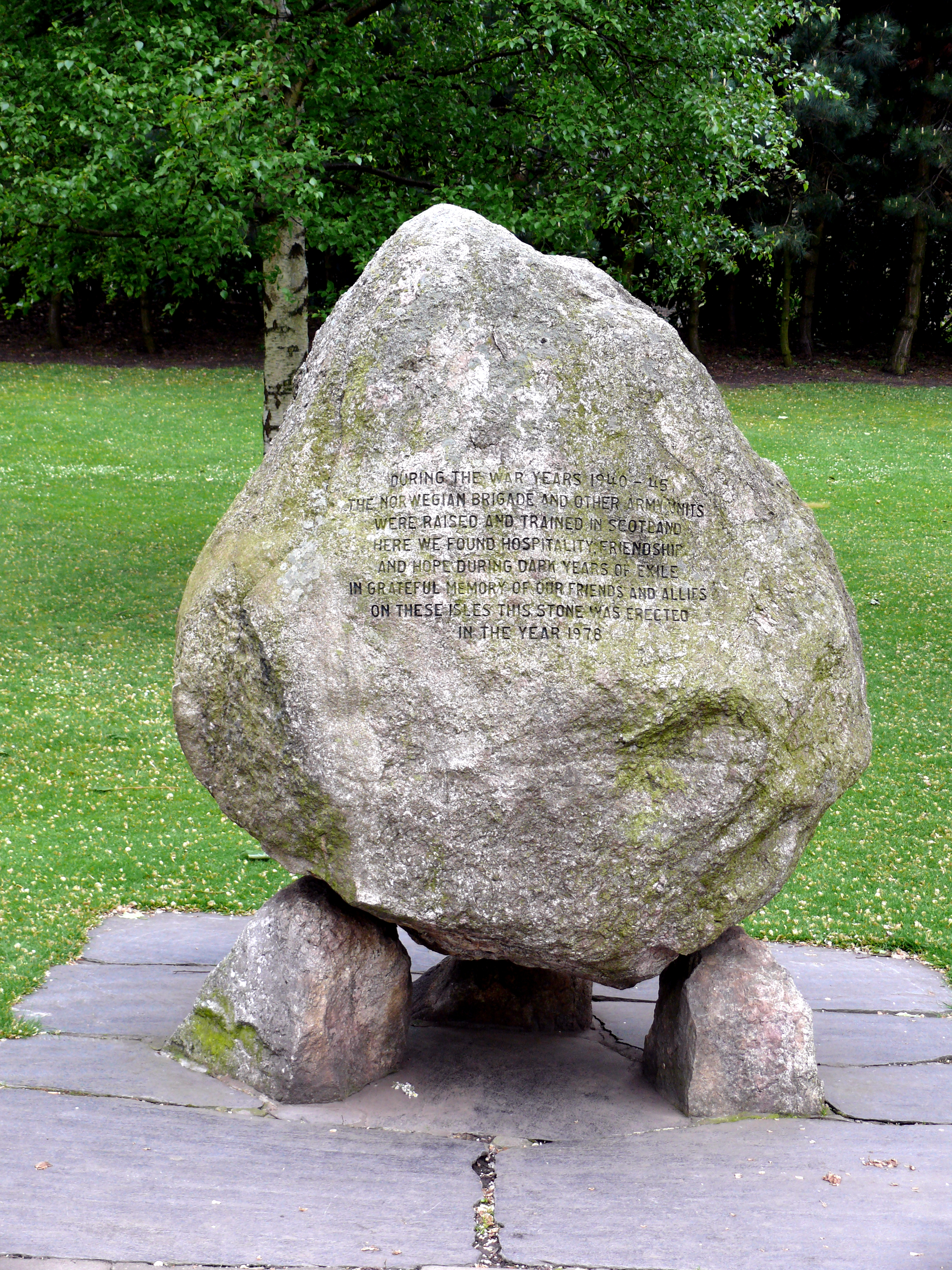
The similar Norwegian stone in Princes Street Gardens, Edinburgh

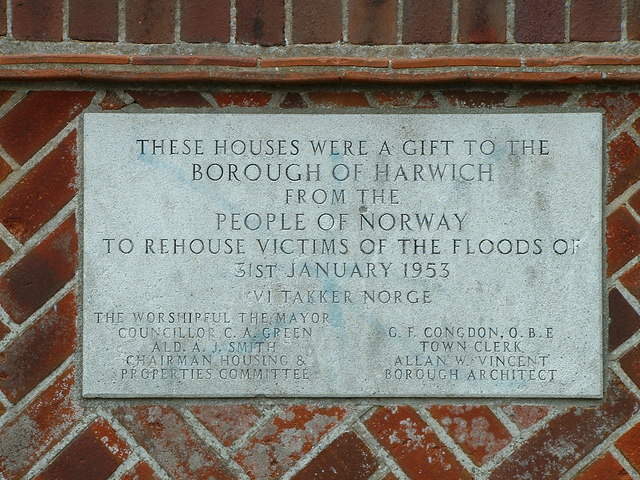
Plaque in Harwich thanking the Norwegian government for the building of new homes

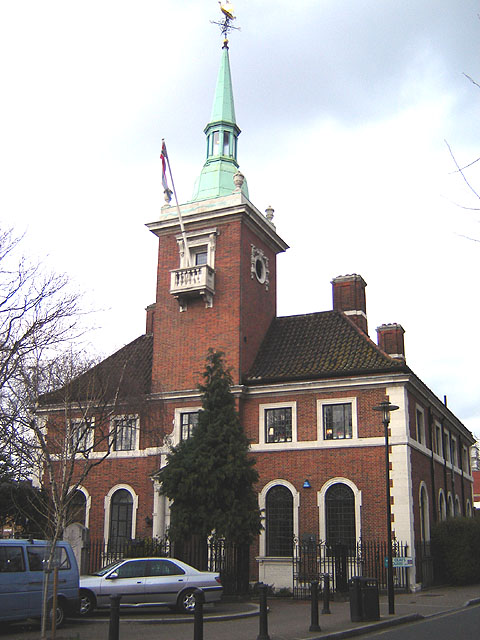
The Norwegian seaman's church in Rotherhithe, London.

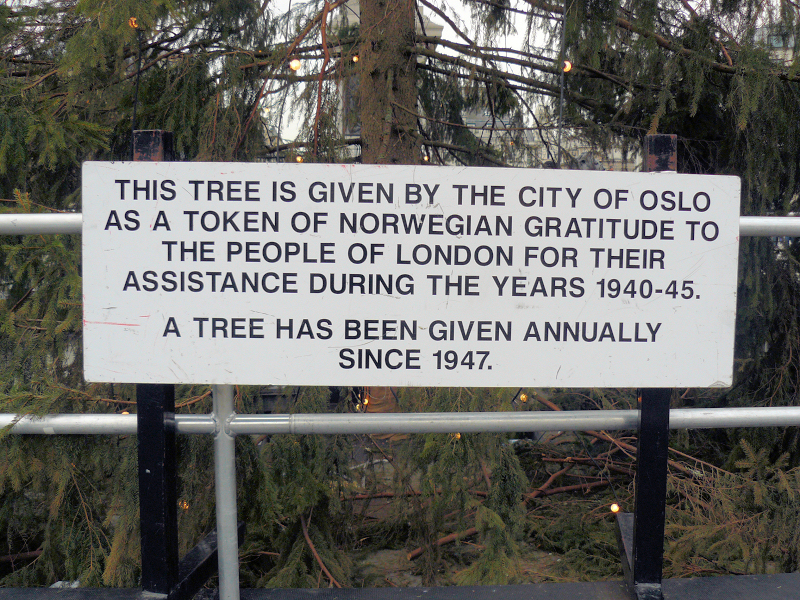
Trafalgar Square Christmas tree

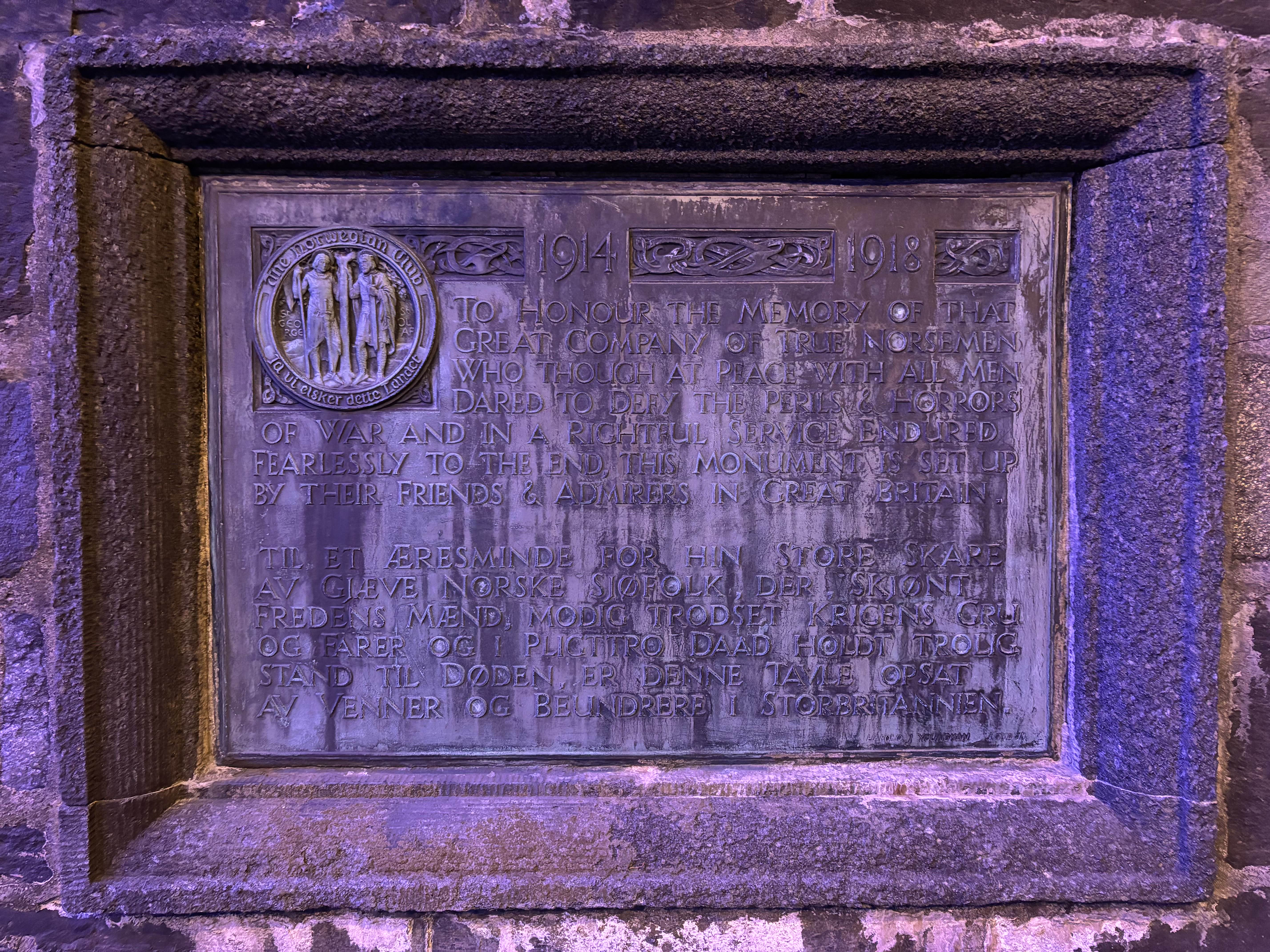
A plaque commemorating Norwegian casualties in the First World War in Bergenhus, Bergen

== See also ==
- Anglo-Norse Society in London – Organization based in England
- Foreign relations of Norway
- Foreign relations of the United Kingdom
- Gunboat War – 1807–1814 war of the Napoleonic Wars
- List of diplomats from the United Kingdom to Norway
- Trafalgar Square Christmas tree – Public tree in London, England
