= List of ambassadors to Norway =

This is a list of ambassadors to Norway. Note that some ambassadors are responsible for more than one country while others are directly accredited to Oslo. Last updated January 24, 2025 - check cited source if uncertain.

== Current Ambassadors to Oslo ==
Sending country	Presentation of the credentials	Location of resident embassy	Ambassador
Afghanistan	January 31, 2025	Oslo, Norway	Najibullah Sherkhan (First Secretary)
Albania	October 10, 2024	Stockholm, Sweden	Albana Dautllari
Algeria	June 1, 2023	Oslo, Norway	Chir Kamel
Andorra	February 13, 2020	Andorra la Vella, Andorra	Rossell Duchamps
Angola	September 11, 2023	Oslo, Norway	Mr Alcino dos Prazeres Isata Francisco da Conceição
Argentina	April 25, 2024	Oslo, Norway	Claudio Alberto Giacomino
Armenia	March 14, 2024	Stockholm, Sweden	Anna Aghadjanian
Australia	February 10, 2022	Copenhagen, Denmark	Kerin Ann Burns Ayyalaraju
Austria	April 28, 2022	Oslo, Norway	Stefan Pehringer
Azerbaijan	March 31, 2022	Stockholm, Sweden	Zaur Rashid Ahmadov
Bahrain	October 19, 2023	Berlin, Germany	Abdulla Abdullatif Abdulla
Bangladesh	March 16, 2023	Stockholm, Sweden	Mehdi Hasan
Barbados		Brussels, Belgium	vacant
Belarus		Stockholm, Sweden	vacant
Belgium	August 31, 2023	Oslo, Norway	Jan Bayart
Benin	December 3, 2015	Paris, France	Eusèbe Agbangla
Bhutan	March 31, 2022	Genève, Switzerland	Tenzin Rondel Wangchuk
Bosnia and Herzegovina	February 10, 2022	Oslo, Norway	Bakir Sadović
Botswana	October 10, 2024	Stockholm, Sweden	Juliana Angela Dube-Gobotswang
Brazil	September 19, 2024	Oslo, Norway	Rodrigo de Azeredo Santos
Brunei	April 13, 2023	Berlin, Germany	Pengiran Hajah Krtini
Bulgaria	August 31, 2023	Oslo, Norway	Dessislava VenelinovaIvanova-Kozleva
Burkina Faso		Copenhagen, Denmark	vacant
Burundi	November 14, 2024	Berlin, Germany	Annonciata Sendazirasa
Cambodia		London, UK	vacant
Cameroon		London, UK	vacant
Canada	September 21, 2023	Oslo, Norway	Amy Lowe Baker
Chad		Berlin, Germany	vacant
Chile	June 10, 2021	Oslo, Norway	Luis Andrés Plaza Gentina
China	January 26, 2023	Oslo, Norway	Yue Hou
Colombia	November 24, 2022	Oslo, Norway	Narda Paola Bernal Rodríguez
Congo		Stockholm, Sweden	vacant
Democratic Republic of the Congo		London, UK	vacant
Costa Rica	April 25, 2024	San José, Costa Rica	Esteban Penrod Padilla
Croatia	October 17, 2019	Oslo, Norway	Andrea Gustović-Ercegovac
Cuba	November 18, 2021	Oslo, Norway	Maité Rivero Torres
Cyprus	March 16, 2023	Stockholm, Sweden	Solon Savva
Czech Republic	January 19, 2023	Oslo, Norway	David Červenka
Denmark	September 23, 2021	Oslo, Norway	Lene Louise Bang Jespersen
Djibouti	March 16, 2023	Brussels, Belgium	Aden Mohamed Dileita
Dominican Republic		Stockholm, Sweden	vacant
Ecuador		Stockholm, Sweden	vacant
Egypt	January 18, 2024	Oslo, Norway	Gamal Abdelrehim Mohamed
El Salvador	January 19, 2023	Stockholm, Sweden	Claudia Beatriz del Carmen
Eritrea		Stockholm, Sweden	vacant
Estonia	August 22, 2024	Oslo, Norway	Piia Mathisen
Ethiopia	October 20, 2022	Stockholm, Sweden	Mehreteab Mulugeta Haile
European Union	November 4, 2021	Oslo, Norway	Nicolas de La Chevardière de La Grandville
Finland	September 22, 2022	Oslo, Norway	Teemu Tanner
France	November 10, 2022	Oslo, Norway	Florence Robine
Gabon		London, UK	vacant
Gambia	April 13, 2023	London, UK	Fatou Bom Bensouda
Georgia	March 16, 2023	Oslo, Norway	Zurab Beridze
Germany	August 25, 2022	Oslo, Norway	Detlef Wächter
Ghana	September 19, 2024	Oslo, Norway	Abigail Naa Adzoko Kwashi
Greece	November 5, 2020	Oslo, Norway	Anna Korka
Guatemala	April 28, 2022	Oslo, Norway	Georges de La Roche Du Ronzet Pilhal
Guinea	November 9, 2023	Berlin, Germany	Aliou Barry
Guyana		Brussels, Belgium	vacant
Holy See	April 27, 2023	Stockholm, Sweden	Julio Murat
Honduras		Brussels, Belgium	vacant
Hungary	May 6, 2021	Oslo, Norway	Eszter Sándorfi
Iceland	August 25, 2022	Oslo, Norway	Högni S. Kristjánsson
India	August 31, 2023	Oslo, Norway	Acquino Vimal
Indonesia	September 21, 2023	Oslo, Norway	Teuku Faizasyah
Iran	June 22, 2020	Oslo, Norway	Alireza Yousefi
Iraq	October 15, 2021	Oslo, Norway	Ali Yassin Mohammed Karim Al-Rahmani
Ireland	August 31, 2023	Oslo, Norway	Claire Buckley
Israel		Oslo, Norway	vacant
Italy	August 25, 2022	Oslo, Norway	Stefano Nicoletti
Jamaica	November 14, 2024	London, UK	Alexander Williams
Japan	March 14, 2024	Oslo, Norway	Akira Sugiyama
Jordan	September 23, 2021	Oslo, Norway	Muhib Mahmoud Ahmad Nimrat
Kazakhstan	February 16, 2023	Oslo, Norway	Adil Tursunov
Kosovo	June 16, 2022	Oslo, Norway	Nita Luci
Kuwait	January 26, 2023	Oslo, Norway	Raed Abdulla S. R. Alrifai
Kyrgyzstan		Berlin, Germany	vacant
Laos		Stockholm, Sweden	vacant
Latvia	September 23, 2021	Oslo, Norway	Mr Mārtiņš Klīve
Lebanon	January 17, 2019	Stockholm, Sweden	Hassan Saleh
Lesotho		Dublin, Ireland	vacant
Liberia	January 17,2019	Berlin, Germany	Youngor Sevelee Telewoda
Libya		Copenhagen, Denmark	vacant
Lithuania	September 22, 2022	Oslo, Norway	Jonas Mažeika
Luxembourg	January 27, 2022	Copenhagen, Denmark	Henri Schumacher
Madagascar		London, UK	vacant
Malawi		London, UK	vacant
Malaysia		Stockholm, Sweden	vacant
Maldives	January 26, 2023	Berlin, Germany	Aishath Shaan Shakir
Mali	March 7, 2019	Berlin, Germany	Oumou Sall-Seck
Malta	November 18, 2021	Valletta, Malta	Marlene Mizzi
Mauritania	June 13, 2024	Brussels, Belgium	Mohamed Mahmoud Ould Brahim Khlil
Mauritius		London, UK	vacant
Mexico	March 14, 2024	Oslo, Norway	Omar Fayad Meneses
Moldova	January 19, 2023	Stockholm, Sweden	Liliana Gutan
Mongolia	December 5, 2024	Stockholm, Sweden	Munkh-Ulzii Tserendorj
Montenegro	January 12, 2019	Podgorica, Montenegro	Mirsad Bibović
Morocco	January 13, 2022	Oslo, Norway	Nabila Freidji
Mozambique	January 17, 2019	Stockholm, Sweden	Florêncio Joel Alberto Sele
Myanmar	August 20, 2015	Oslo, Norway	Maw Maw
Namibia	September 9, 2019	Stockholm, Sweden	George Mbanga Liswaniso
Nepal	October 19, 2023	Copenhagen, Denmark	Ram Swarth Ray
Netherlands	September 19, 2024	Oslo, Norway	G.C. (Ines) Coppoolse
New Zealand	November 9, 2023	Stockholm, Sweden	David Leslie Taylor
Niger	May 5, 2022	Copenhagen, Denmark	Moussa Dourfaye
Nigeria		Stockholm, Sweden	vacant
North Korea	April 10, 2019	Stockholm, Sweden	Won Guk Ri
North Macedonia	October 20, 2022	Oslo, Norway	Driton Kukji
Oman	January 18, 2024	Berlin, Germany	Maitha Saif Majid Al Mahrouqi
Pakistan	January 26, 2023	Oslo, Norway	Saadia Altaf Qazi
Panama		Stockholm, Sweden	vacant
Peru	September 21, 2023	Oslo, Norway	Gustavo Julio Eduardo Francisco Laurie Escandón
Philippines	December 2, 2021	Oslo, Norway	Enrico Trinidad Fos
Poland		Oslo, Norway	vacant
Portugal	March 31, 2022	Oslo, Norway	Pedro Maria Santos Pessoa e Costa
Qatar	January 18, 2024	Stockholm, Sweden	Nadya bint Ahmad Al-Sheebi
Romania	September 2, 2021	Oslo, Norway	Marius-Cristian Bădescu
Russia	November 14, 2024	Oslo, Norway	Nikolay Korchunov
Rwanda	February 10, 2022	Stockholm, Sweden	Diane Gashumba
San Marino	May 5, 2022	San Marino	Federica Bigi
Saudi Arabia	August 22, 2024	Oslo, Norway	Khaled Mohammed I. Badawi H. Alsharif
Senegal		The Hague, Netherlands	vacant
Serbia	September 2, 2021	Oslo, Norway	Dragan Petrović
Seychelles		London, UK	vacant
Sierra Leone		London, UK	vacant
Singapore	June 14, 2019	Singapore, Singapore	Wah YeowTan
Slovakia	November 4, 2021	Oslo, Norway	Roman Bužek
Slovenia	February 16, 2024	Copenhagen, Denmark	Mihael Zupančič
South Africa	June 9, 2022	Oslo, Norway	Delores Camilla Kotzė
South Korea	August 22, 2024	Oslo, Norway	Minjeong Seo
South Sudan	November 24, 2022	Oslo, Norway	Mustafa Lowoh Walla Jabi
Spain	August 22, 2024	Oslo, Norway	Alejandra del Río Novo
Sri Lanka		Stockholm, Sweden	vacant
Sudan		Oslo, Norway	vacant
Suriname	October 10, 2024	The Hague, Netherlands	Rajendre Khargi
Sweden	April 25, 2024	Oslo, Norway	Erik Gustav Mikael Eriksson
Switzerland	September 21, 2023	Oslo, Norway	Nathalie Marti
Syria		Stockholm, Sweden	vacant
Tajikistan	February 13, 2020	Vienna, Austria	Idibek Kalandar
Tanzania	June 9, 2022	Stockholm, Sweden	Grace Alfred Olotu
Thailand	June 13, 2024	Oslo, Norway	Nitivadee Manitkul
Togo		Berlin, Germany	vacant
Trinidad and Tobago		London, UK	vacant
Tunisia	December 17, 2024	Oslo, Norway	Amel Ben Younes
Turkey	February 16, 2023	Oslo, Norway	Gülin Dinç
Turkmenistan	February 11, 2016	London, London	Yazmurad Seryaev
Uganda	April 27, 2023	Copenhagen, Denmark	Margaret Mutembeya Otteskov
Ukraine		Oslo, Norway	vacant
United Arab Emirates	February 19, 2023	Oslo, Norway	Fatema AlMazrouei
United Kingdom	April 27, 2023	Oslo, Norway	Jan Thompson
United States		Oslo, Norway	vacant
Uruguay		Stockholm, Sweden	vacant
Uzbekistan		London, UK	vacant
Venezuela	November 10, 2022	Oslo, Norway	Ramón Antonio Gordils Montes
Vietnam	June 1, 2023	Oslo, Norway	Nho Hung Dinh
Yemen	November 30, 2017	The Hague, Netherlands	Sahar Mohammed Abduljabbar Ghanem
Zambia	January 18, 2024	Stockholm, Sweden	Gladys Lundwe
Zimbabwe	October 20, 2022	Stockholm, Sweden	Priscila Misihairabwi-Mushonga

== See also ==
- Foreign relations of Norway
- List of diplomatic missions of Norway
- List of diplomatic missions in Norway
