= Arthur James Herbert (diplomat) =

British diplomat (1855–1921)

Sir Arthur Herbert KCVO DL

British Envoy to Norway
- In office 1905–1911
- Preceded by: Inaugural holder
- Succeeded by: Sir Mansfeldt Findlay

Personal details
- Born: Arthur James Herbert; 22 August 1855
- Died: 31 August 1921 (aged 66)
- Spouse: Helen Louise Gammell (m. 1892)
- Relations: Ivor Herbert, 1st Baron Treowen (brother); Benjamin Hall, 1st Baron Llanover (grandfather)
- Children: Sir John Herbert
- Parent(s): John Arthur Edward Herbert; Hon. Augusta Hall Herbert
- Education: Christ Church, Oxford

Sir Arthur James Herbert, GCVO (22 August 1855 – 31 August 1921) was a British diplomat who served as the first British envoy to Norway.

== Early life ==
He was the second son of Hon. Augusta Charlotte Elizabeth (née Hall) Herbert and John Arthur Edward Herbert, the High Sheriff of Monmouthshire. Among his siblings were Ivor Herbert, 1st Baron Treowen, Florence Herbert (wife of Joseph Monteith), and Lt.-Col. Edward Bleiddian Herbert of the 17th Lancers (who married Hon. Mary Dalberg-Acton, daughter of John Dalberg-Acton, 1st Baron Acton).

His paternal grandparents were John Jones of Llanarth Court and the former Lady Harriet Plunkett (a daughter of Arthur Plunkett, 8th Earl of Fingall). His mother was the only surviving child of Benjamin Hall, 1st Baron Llanover and the former Augusta Waddington (sister of Frances Bunsen, wife of the Prussian diplomat Baron Bunsen).

Herbert was educated at Christ Church, Oxford, and joined the Diplomatic Service in 1879.

== Career ==
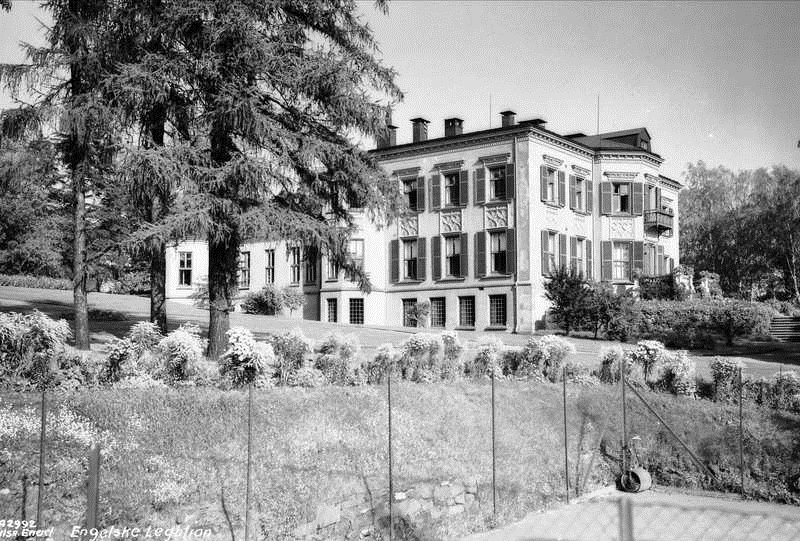
The Villa Frognæs in 1935

In the early years of his service, he was posted at Petrograd, Washington, D.C., Buenos Aires, Tehran, Brussels, Bern, Stockholm and Copenhagen. In August 1902, he was appointed Consul-General at Budapest, and the following year he became chargé d'affaires at Darmstadt (Hesse) and Karlsruhe (Baden). He received official allowances for knowledge of Russian and Persian and spoke five other languages fluently.

After the dissolution of the union between Norway and Sweden in 1905, Herbert was appointed the first British envoy to the newly independent Norway, with the then-customary title of Envoy Extraordinary and Minister Plenipotentiary. He was the first foreign envoy to arrive in Christiania (now Oslo) after the recognition of Norway as an independent state by foreign powers.

Shortly afterwards he bought the Villa Frognæs, built in 1859 for the banker Thomas Heftye and recognized as one of the finest private residences in the city, to be the British Legation. The Foreign Office had strongly recommended a rental property, but Herbert argued that with the new Norwegian king, Haakon VII, married to a British princess, it was imperative for Britain to establish a first-class legation there, and the British Treasury approved the purchase early in 1906. The Villa Frognæs remains the official residence of the British Ambassador, but new offices have been built behind the house, facing Thomas Heftyes gate, to house the embassy.

Herbert was appointed envoy to Mexico in 1911 but did not proceed and instead retired from the diplomatic service. Sir Arthur was Deputy Lieutenant of Monmouthshire.

== Personal life ==
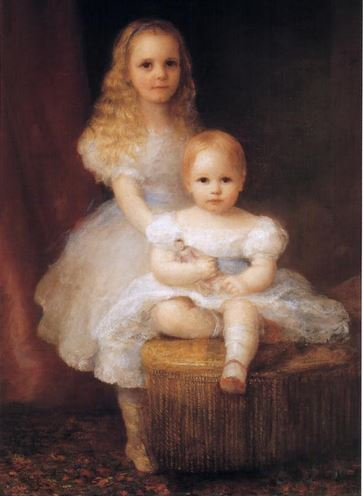
Harriet Ives Gammell, age 6, Helen Louise Gammell, age 3

On 14 December 1892, Herbert married Helen Louise Gammell at Our Lady of the Isle in Newport, Rhode Island with the reception being held at the Gammell cottage known as "Ocean Lawn" there. Together, they were the parents of John Arthur Herbert (1895–1943), an MP for Monmouth and Governor of Bengal.

After his retirement, Sir Arthur and Lady Herbert returned to America and vacationed amongst her family, including at Newport and Tuxedo Park, New York.

Sir Arthur died on 31 August 1921.

=== Honours ===
Herbert was appointed CVO in 1905, knighted KCVO on his appointment to Norway and raised to GCVO in 1908 on the occasion of a state visit by King Edward VII to Norway. He was made a Knight Grand Cross of the Order of Saint Olav by King Haakon VII in 1906.

Diplomatic posts
First	Envoy Extraordinary and Minister Plenipotentiary to His Majesty the King of Norway; 1905–1911	Succeeded by Sir Mansfeldt Findlay
