= Richard Wood (diplomat) =

British diplomat

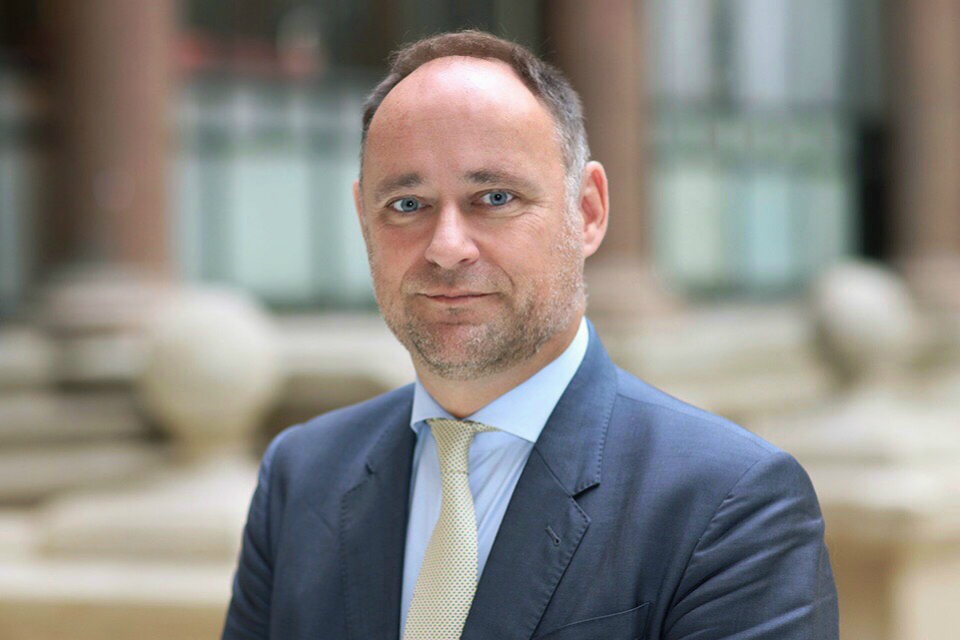

British Ambassador to Norway
- In office 23 August 2018 – April 2023
- Monarchs: Elizabeth II; Charles III
- Prime Minister: Boris Johnson; Liz Truss; Rishi Sunak
- Preceded by: Sarah Gillett
- Succeeded by: Jan Thompson

Personal details
- Born: 27 August 1967 (age 58) Great Yarmouth, Norfolk, England

Richard Wood is a British diplomat, who served as the British Ambassador to Norway from 2018 to 2023.

== Early life ==
Richard John Wood was born on 27 August 1967 in Great Yarmouth in Norfolk, England. Wood is the son of John Michael Wood and Christine Barbara Wood.

Wood was educated at Lynn Grove High School and East Norfolk Sixth Form College. Wood attended Leeds Polytechnic, graduating with a BA (Hons) in European languages and institutions in 1990.

== Career ==
Wood joined the Foreign and Commonwealth Office (FCO) in 1990. His first role was as Desk Officer for the Single Market, European Presidency, and Gibraltar.

His first foreign posting was as the Second Secretary for internal politics in Cape Town and Pretoria. During his first posting Wood was outed as homosexual to the FCO Security Department by colleagues, and was sent back to Britain and told to expect dismissal. He was allowed to keep his job, but said that he faced "years of resentment and fear".

After returning to the UK in 1998, he was press officer for Africa in the FCO news department two years, head of a European Union team for two years, then was posted to the UK mission in New York as first secretary (human rights/social development) from 2002 to 2007. He was back in Cape Town as British Consul General from 2007 to 2011, then briefly served in Basra, Iraq before he returned to the FCO in 2012. An appointment to Washington DC as Counsellor (foreign and security policy) was ended in 2015, when he became head of the FCO Northern and Central Europe Department. He was appointed as British Ambassador to Norway on 23 August 2018 and completed this posting in 2023, when he returned to the Foreign Office.

== Personal life ==
Wood married his husband Xavier Piot in 2008. They have a dog called Hudson. Wood speaks fluent Norwegian.

Diplomatic posts
Preceded by Sarah Gillett	British Ambassador to Norway; 2018–2023	Succeeded by Jan Thompson
