= Alfhild Hovdan =

Norwegian journalist and tourist manager

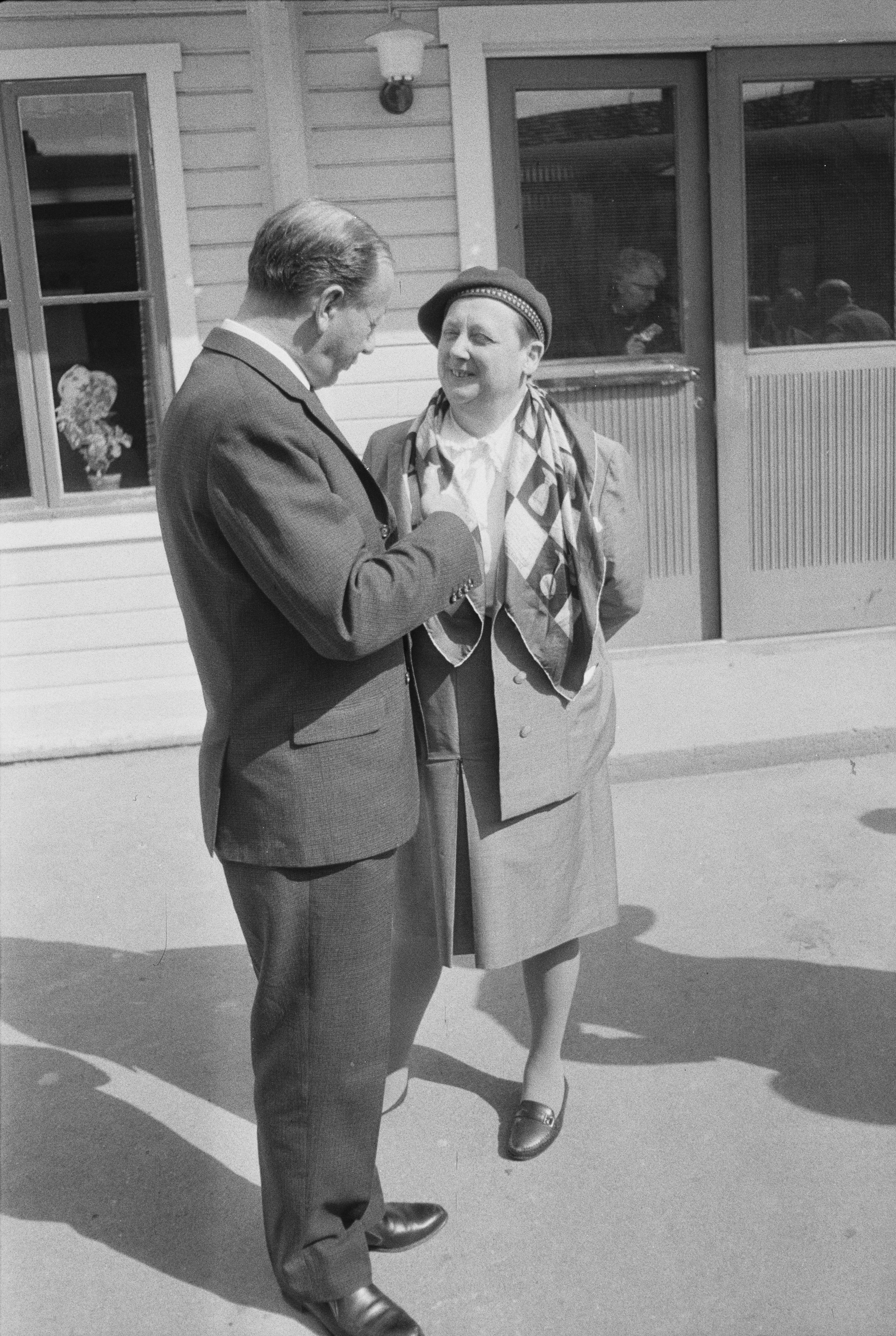
- Born: Alfhild Olsen; 13 September 1904; Kristiania, Norway
- Died: 20 February 1982 (aged 77)
- Occupations: journalist, and later tourist manager for the city of Oslo
- Known for: initiating the tradition of the Trafalgar Square Christmas tree
- Awards: Medal of St. Hallvard (1967)

Alfhild Hovdan (née Olsen; 13 September 1904 – 20 February 1982) was a Norwegian journalist, and later tourist manager for the city of Oslo for more than forty years. She is known for initiating the tradition of the Trafalgar Square Christmas tree, a present from the city of Oslo to the people of London, in recognition of their assistance during World War II.

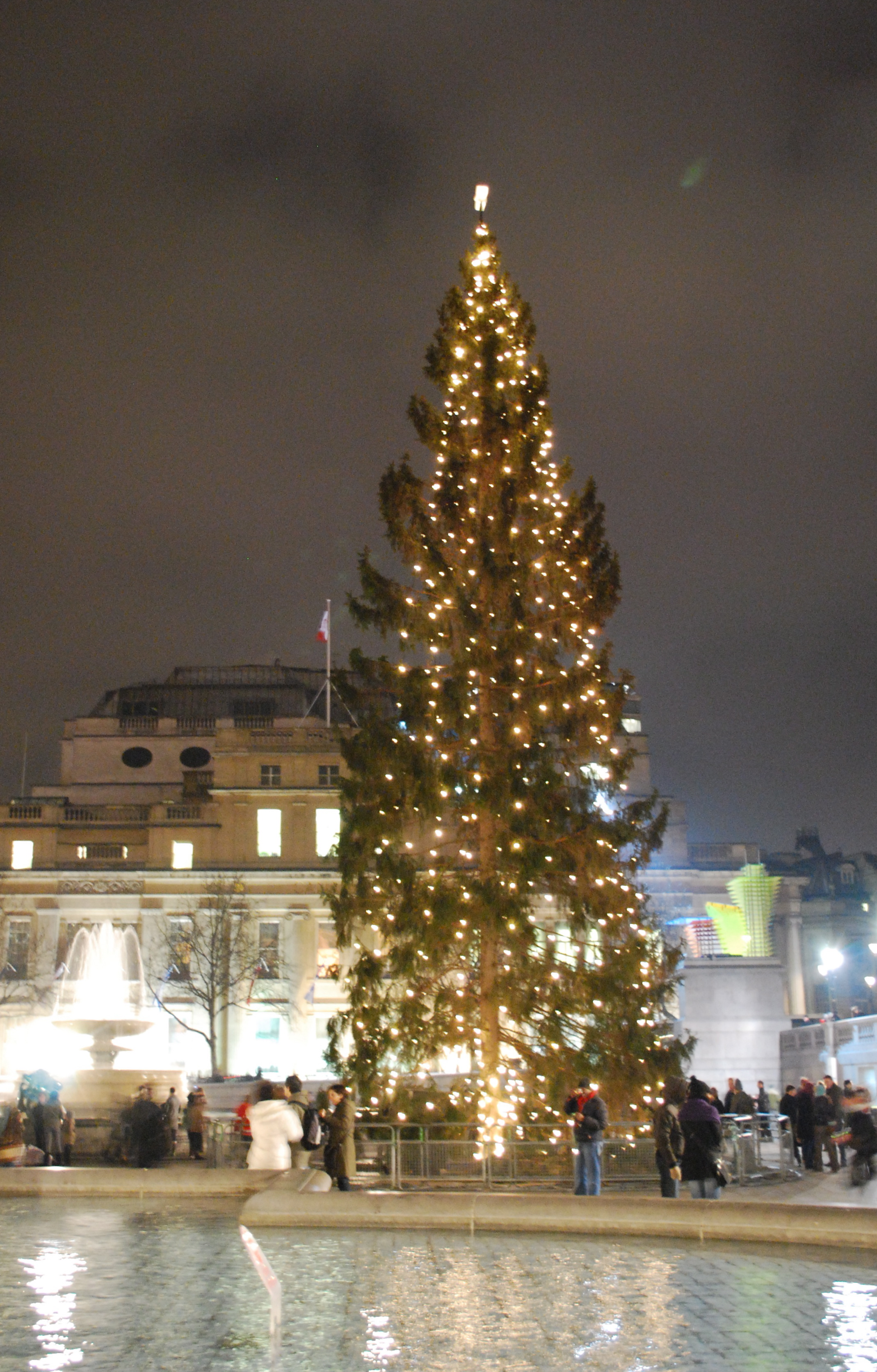
The Trafalgar Square Christmas tree in 2008, a tradition initiated by Alfhild Hovdan in 1947.

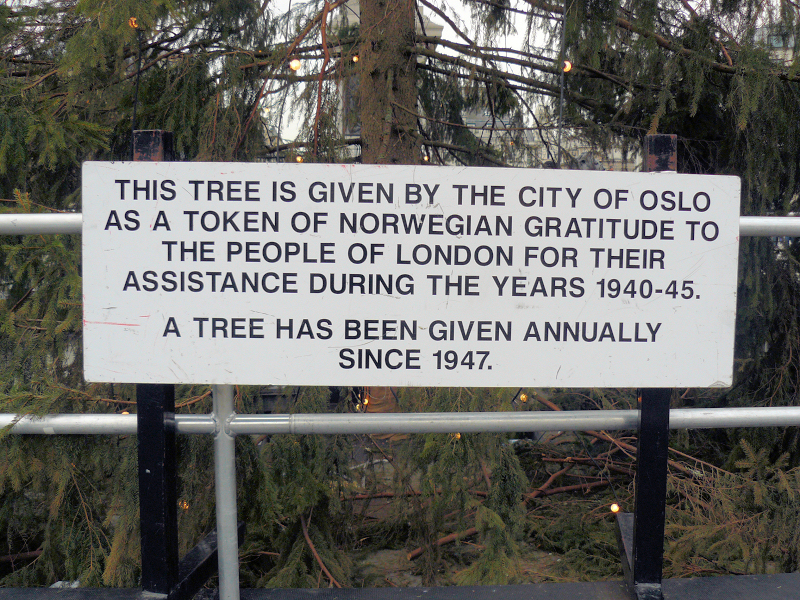
Plaque at the base of the Trafalgar Square Christmas tree (2008).

== Early career ==
Hovdan was born in Kristiania, and grew up in Skien. After examen artium she started a career as journalist. From 1927 she worked for the Swedish newspaper Stockholms Dagblad, and for Oslo Aftenavis and the magazine Film. In 1928 she became famous for walking all the way from Stockholm to Rome, crossing the Alps, including having an audience with the Pope in Rome, while a correspondent for Scandinavian newspapers. She also wrote articles on art, theatre and film for the female magazine Urd.

Hovdan was appointed secretary for Reisetrafikkforeningen for Oslo og Omegn in 1931, and was manager of the organization from 1932 to 1976.

== World War II ==
Hovdan was a member of the Norwegian resistance movement during the German occupation of Norway. She was arrested by the Nazi authorities in June 1941 for propaganda against Germany, incarcerated at Møllergata 19 and Grini concentration camp, and released in October 1941. She was involved with the activist network "2A", supported people hiding from the Nazis and helped them to escape to Sweden. She had to flee to Sweden in April 1942, where she worked at the Norwegian legation in Stockholm, in the "Sports Office" (Norwegian: Idrettskontoret), headed by Harald Gram, which organized underground courier traffic between Sweden and Norway.

While in Sweden, she was among the founders of the theatre group Fri Norsk Scene, which consisted of Norwegian actors residing in Sweden as refugees.

== Post war ==
In 1947 she initiated the tradition of donating a Christmas tree to London, a present from the city of Oslo, in recognition of assistance from the people of London during World War II. In the following years she was always present at the ceremony when the tree was cut down, along with the mayor of Oslo. She continued her work as "Tourist Manager" for Oslo until 1976, and has been characterized as brave, dynamic and controversial, being called names such as "The Shrew" (Norwegian: Rivjernet) and "The Bulldozer".

Hovdan was awarded the Medal of St. Hallvard in 1967.
