= David Ratford =

British diplomat and translator (1934–2025)

Sir David Ratford KCMG CVO

British Ambassador to Norway
- In office 1990–1994
- Monarch: Elizabeth II
- Preceded by: Sir John Robson
- Succeeded by: Mark Elliott

Personal details
- Born: David John Edward Ratford; 22 April 1934
- Died: 2 October 2025 (aged 91)
- Education: Selwyn College, Cambridge

Sir David John Edward Ratford KCMG CVO (22 April 1934 – 2 October 2025) was a British diplomat and translator.

== Early life ==
David John Edward Ratford was born on 22 April 1934 to George Ratford and Lilian Ratford (née Jones).

Ratford was educated at Whitgift Middle School. Ratford attended Selwyn College, Cambridge, graduating with a 1st class Honours degree in Medieval and Modern Languages.

== Diplomatic career ==
Ratford completed his national service in the Intelligence Corps from 1953 to 1955.

=== Ambassador to Norway ===
Ratford was appointed the British Ambassador to Norway in 1990, succeeding Sir John Robson.

He left this appointment in 1994.

== Retirement ==
In April 2004, Ratford signed an open letter to Prime Minister Tony Blair, expressing concern over Blair's policy on the Arab-Israel conflict and the Iraq war.

In December 2004, Ratford signed a further open letter, urging Blair to commission an independent inquiry into the number of civilian casualties in Iraq since the invasion.

== Personal life and death ==
Ratford married Ulla Monica in 1960. He died on 2 October 2025, at the age of 91.
