= East Norfolk Sixth Form College =

Location
- Church Lane, Gorleston-on-Sea; Great Yarmouth, Norfolk, East Anglia, NR31 7BQ; England; 52°34′42″N 1°43′15″E

Information
- Type: Sixth Form College
- Established: 1982
- Local authority: Norfolk
- Principal: Dr. Catherine Richards
- Gender: Co-educational
- Age: 16 to 19 (Adult Ed. also offered)
- Enrolment: 1,631
- Telephone: 01493 662234
- Website: https://www.eastnorfolk.ac.uk

East Norfolk Sixth Form College (commonly abbreviated to EN) is a sixth form college in the Gorleston-on-Sea area of Great Yarmouth, Norfolk, England. The college ranges from about 1,600 students most of whom are between the ages of 16–18. These students enroll from areas across Norfolk and North Suffolk.

== History ==
Opened in 1982 it uses the building of the former Alderman Leach Secondary Modern school to form part of its campus in the centre of Gorleston-on-Sea. The college offers 90 different subjects including A levels, BTEC, GCSE and a number of other pathways in further education. New pathways include T Levels and the Level 4 Foundation Degree programs. The college is also one of only 25 FA Super Hubs and the only local provider with a Combined Cadet Force (CCF). It is also an approved centre for the Duke of Edinburgh Awards.

The college has undergone a £7m expansion and improvement programme. This includes a state of the art 3G pitch, and investment in new classrooms and technology to support the introduction of the T Level program across the country. The college's expansion saw the development of its Cator building, named after Henry Cator OBE, FRICS, FRAgS, DL - the High Steward of Great Yarmouth, who has visited the college on multiple occasions and supported its growth.

== Notable people ==
- Ben Garrod, biologist
- Rob Houchen, actor
- Hannah Spearritt, actress and singer
- Richard Wood, diplomat
- Bimini Bon-Boulash, drag performer
- Sophie McKinna, shot putter
