= Jane Owen =

British diplomat (born 1963)

Her Excellency Jane Owen
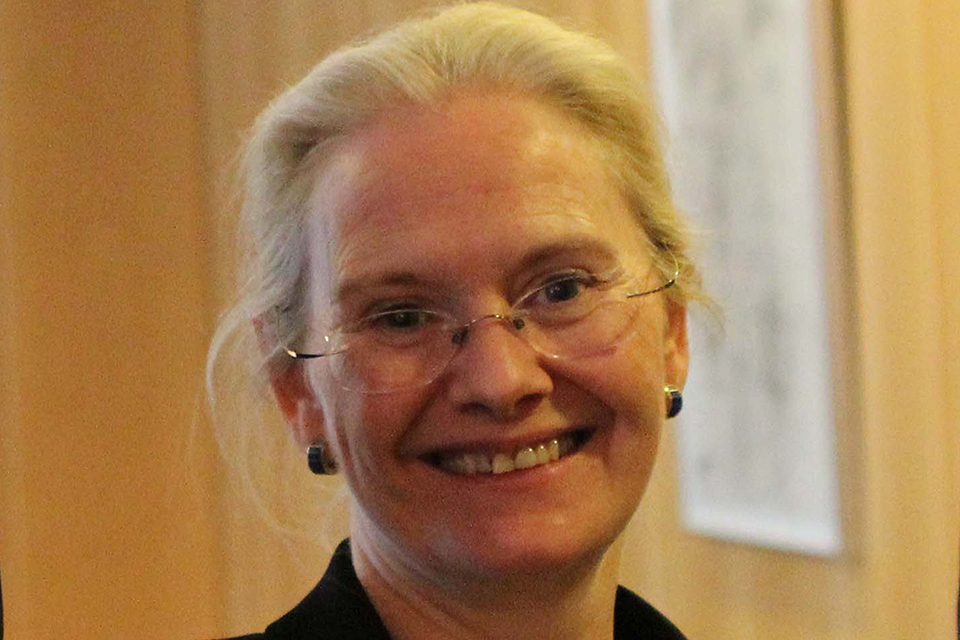

Governor of the Cayman Islands
- Incumbent
- Assumed office 21 April 2023
- Monarch: Charles III
- Premier: Wayne Panton; Juliana O'Connor-Connolly; André Ebanks
- Preceded by: Martyn Roper

British Ambassador to Switzerland and Liechtenstein
- In office 2018–2023
- Monarchs: Elizabeth II; Charles III
- Prime Minister: Theresa May; Boris Johnson; Liz Truss; Rishi Sunak
- Preceded by: David Moran
- Succeeded by: James Squire

British Ambassador to Norway
- In office 2010–2014
- Monarch: Elizabeth II
- Prime Minister: David Cameron
- Preceded by: David Powell
- Succeeded by: Sarah Gillett

Personal details
- Born: Jane Caroline Owen; 15 April 1963 (age 63) Bilston, Staffordshire, England
- Education: Trinity College, Cambridge

Jane Caroline Owen (born 15 April 1963) is a British politician and diplomat. She is the current Governor of the Cayman Islands and the second woman to hold this position. She had previously served as the British ambassador to Switzerland and Liechtenstein and the British ambassador to Norway.

== Career ==
Owen was born in Bilston and educated at Ellerslie School in Malvern (now merged with Malvern College) and Trinity College, Cambridge, graduating with a Batchelor's degree in Russia, French and German. After graduating in 1986, she taught English in Japan as part of the JET Programme. In 1987, she entered the Foreign and Commonwealth Office (FCO).

After Japanese language training in 1988–90, she worked at the Tokyo embassy in 1990–93 and then was seconded to the Department of Trade and Industry as head of the Exports to Japan Unit in 1993–96. She returned to the FCO in 1996–98 and was then posted to Hanoi as deputy head of mission in 1998–2002. She returned to Tokyo as director of trade promotion in 2002–06, then was posted to New Delhi as director of UK Trade and Investment (UKTI) in India in 2006–10. She was British ambassador to Norway 2010–14, chief operating officer of UKTI in London 2014–16, then was appointed ambassador to the Swiss Confederation and concurrently non-resident ambassador to the Principality of Liechtenstein. She was chosen to be the Cayman Islands Governor. She arrived in Cayman and was sworn in on 21 April 2023.

In 2025, the Cayman Islands government projected they would have a CI$80 million deficit for the financial year. Owen's office stated that the Governor would not intervene in asking for British assistance unless the projections became a reality, in which case she would order the government to come up with a three year plan to remedy it.

Diplomatic posts
Preceded by David Powell	British Ambassador to Norway; 2010–2014	Succeeded by Sarah Gillett
Preceded by David Moran	British Ambassador to Switzerland and Liechtenstein; 2017–2023	Succeeded by James Squire
Government offices
Preceded by Jon Harding	Chief Operating Officer, UK Trade and Investment, London; 2014–2016	UKTI replaced by Department for International Trade
Preceded by Martyn Roper	Governor of the Cayman Islands; 2023–present	Incumbent
