= John Arthur Edward Herbert =

Welsh diplomat (1818-1895)

John Arthur Edward Herbert DL, JP
- Born: John Arthur Edward Jones; 12 October 1818
- Died: 18 August 1895 (aged 76)
- Occupations: Diplomat; Deputy Lieutenant for the County of Monmouthshire; High Sheriff of Monmouthshire
- Children: six, including Major General Ivor John Caradoc Herbert
- Relatives: Arthur Plunkett, 8th Earl of Fingall (maternal grandfather)

John Arthur Edward Herbert DL JP (12 October 1818 – 18 August 1895) was Deputy Lieutenant for the County of Monmouthshire. He was also High Sheriff of Monmouthshire in 1849.

== Family ==
John Arthur Edward Jones was born on 12 October 1818. His father was John Jones of Llanarth Court and his mother was Lady Harriet James Plunkett, daughter of Arthur Plunkett, 8th Earl of Fingall.

On 2 October 1848 he changed his surname to Herbert by Royal sign-manual.

On 12 November 1846 he married the Honourable Augusta Charlotte Elizabeth Hall, daughter of Benjamin Hall, 1st Baron Llanover, a prominent Liberal member of Parliament and later a Cabinet Minister and his wife Augusta, a patron of Welsh culture. The children from this marriage were:

- Henrietta Mary Arianwen Herbert (26 July 1848), married the Honourable Walter Constable Maxwell on 24 November 1898
- Florence Catherine Mary Herbert (17 April 1850), married Joseph Monteith
- Ivor John Caradoc Herbert (16 July 1851), became Major General (army), MP, ennobled as 1st Baron Treowen
- Arthur James Herbert (22 August 1855), MA, married Helen Louise Gammell, daughter f William Gammell of Rhode Island, became a diplomat, envoy to Norway
- Edward Bleiddian Herbert (23 January 1858), married the Honourable Mary Elizabeth Dalberg Acton, daughter of John Dalberg-Acton, 1st Baron Acton, became Lieutenant-Colonel (army)
- Stephen Sulien Charles Herbert (18 December 1864)

Honorary titles
Preceded by Edward Harris Phillips	High Sheriff of Monmouthshire; 1849	Succeeded by Crawshay Bailey
