= Mansfeldt Findlay =

British diplomat (1861–1932)

Sir Mansfeldt Findlay GBE KCMG CB JP
- Portrait by Walter Stoneman, 1919

HM Envoy Extraordinary and Minister Plenipotentiary to Norway
- In office 1911–1923

HM Envoy Extraordinary and Minister Plenipotentiary to Bulgaria
- In office 1909–1911

Personal details
- Born: Mansfeldt de Cardonnel Findlay; 7 April 1861
- Died: 31 December 1932 (aged 71)

Sir Mansfeldt de Cardonnel Findlay (7 April 1861 – 31 December 1932) was a British diplomat who had the difficult task of envoy to Norway during World War I.

== Career ==
Findlay was educated at Harrow School and joined the Diplomatic Service as an Attaché in 1885. He served at Stockholm, Constantinople, Vienna, Buenos Aires and Belgrade.

He was Minister Resident at Dresden and Coburg 1907–09, and Envoy Extraordinary and Minister Plenipotentiary at Sofia 1909–11 and at Christiania 1911–23, including the important period of World War I.

Christiania, which up till 1914 was an extremely pleasant post for a Minister who happened to be fond of fishing, became, on the outbreak of the War, one of intense and arduous difficulty. The problem that increasingly dominated Findlay's work was the double problem of the blockade of Germany and the passage of goods in transit to Russia. The normal difficulties of exercising control over the imports into neutral countries so as to ensure that a surplus over and above their own needs did not go on to fatten Germany, a control that was resisted by all the neutrals and took years to perfect, were enormously increased in the Scandinavian countries by the fact, little realized by critics, that pressure by Great Britain was apt to provoke interference in the free transit to Russia of arms, munitions, and other essential war supplies. Findlay in Christiania, like Howard in Stockholm, had to act with the greatest circumspection, and in his multifarious negotiations with the Norwegian Government, trade trusts, and individual firms, had to contrive to get the maximum harm done to German interests with the minimum harm to Russian and Allied interests.
The full effect of his work was understood by few people outside the Contraband Department of the Foreign Office. It was certainly not understood by the general public.
— The Times, 2 January 1933

R. H. Bruce Lockhart described Findlay as "one of the tallest Englishmen in the world and certainly the tallest man in diplomacy. He was a good organiser and, aided by Charles Brudenell-Bruce, ran his huge Legation (Christiania, in peace time a diplomatic backwater, had, owing to the blockade, the largest staff of any Legation or Embassy during the war) with great efficiency."

In October 1914 Sir Roger Casement, an Irish nationalist, travelled to Germany via Norway with a companion named Adler Christensen. Accounts of what happened in Christiania differ. Casement's version was that Christensen was taken to the British legation and that Findlay offered him a reward if Casement was "knocked on the head". However, his version is contradicted by documents released years later by the British security services. British records suggest that Christensen approached the British Legation voluntarily with a plan to betray Casement, was given a small amount of money, and was offered a large amount for information that would lead to Casement's capture.

== Honours ==
Mansfeldt Findlay was appointed a Companion of the Order of St Michael and St George (CMG) in the 1904 Birthday Honours, Companion of the Order of the Bath (CB) in the 1908 Birthday Honours, promoted to Knight Commander of the Order of St Michael and St George (KCMG) in the 1916 Birthday Honours and given the additional knighthood of Knight Grand Cross of the Order of the British Empire (GBE) in the 1924 Birthday Honours on his retirement. The King of Norway awarded him the Grand Cross of the Order of St Olaf.

Diplomatic posts
Preceded by Hugh Gough, 3rd Viscount Gough	Minister Resident at the Courts of Saxony and Saxe-Coburg and Gotha, and Charge d'Affaires at the Court of Waldeck and Pyrmont; 1907–1909	Succeeded by Arthur Grant Duff
Preceded by Sir George Buchanan	Envoy Extraordinary and Minister Plenipotentiary to His Majesty the King of the Bulgarians; 1909–1911	Succeeded by Sir Henry Bax-Ironside
Preceded by Sir Arthur Herbert	Envoy Extraordinary and Minister Plenipotentiary to His Majesty the King of Norway; 1911–1923	Succeeded by Sir Francis Lindley
