= Christopher Lintrup Paus =

British diplomat

Christopher Lintrup Paus CBE
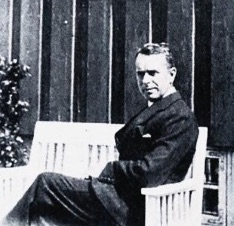

British Consul in Oslo
- In office 1926–1931

Personal details
- Born: 6 November 1881 Chorlton-on-Medlock, England, UK
- Died: 28 May 1963 (aged 81) Grantown-on-Spey, Scotland, UK

Christopher "Kiff" Lintrup Paus CBE (Norwegian: [krɪˈstɔ̀fːər ˈpæʉs]; 6 November 1881 in – 28 May 1963) was a British diplomat, who served at the British Embassy in Oslo for several decades, as commercial counsellor and as the British consul in Oslo and head of the British consular service in Norway. He wrote several published reports on industrial and economic affairs in Norway.

== Early life and education ==
Paus spent his early childhood in Withington and later lived in Bradford. Paus attended Bradford Grammar School. He studied at Jesus College, Oxford (1900–1904), graduating with a master's degree in 1904.

== Career ==
Paus became commercial attaché at the British Embassy in Oslo in December 1914, in succession to Sir Francis Oppenheimer, was promoted to commercial secretary for Norway in May 1919 and served as the British consul in Oslo from 1926 to 1931. In 1939 he was promoted to the personal rank of counsellor of embassy. He retired from His Majesty's Diplomatic Service on 27 April 1941.

== Family ==
A member of the Norwegian Paus family, he was a son of the Norwegian-born businessman Christopher Paus (1843–1919) of Manchester and an English mother, Ellen née Lord (1847–1917). He was a brother of the British businessmen Charles Johan Paus and Rudolph Henrik Paus, co-owners of the Manchester firm Blydt, Paus and Pace, and of the businessman Oscar Lionel Paus (1880–1917), who died as a British lieutenant in the First World War. He was married to Gunda Resch Knudsen, daughter of the Norwegian ship-owner and Member of Parliament Jørgen Christian Knudsen and a niece of Prime Minister Gunnar Knudsen. He was a grandson of Henrik Johan Paus and a first cousin of papal chamberlain, count Christopher Tostrup Paus. His father was a first cousin of playwright Henrik Ibsen.

== Legacy ==
Some of his private papers are owned by the Imperial War Museum.

== Honours ==
- Officer of the Most Excellent Order of the British Empire (OBE), in the 1918 New Year Honours
- Commander of the Most Excellent Order of the British Empire (CBE), in the 1920 New Year Honours
- King George VI Coronation Medal (1937)
