= Sarah Gillett =

British diplomat

Sarah Gillett CMG CVO
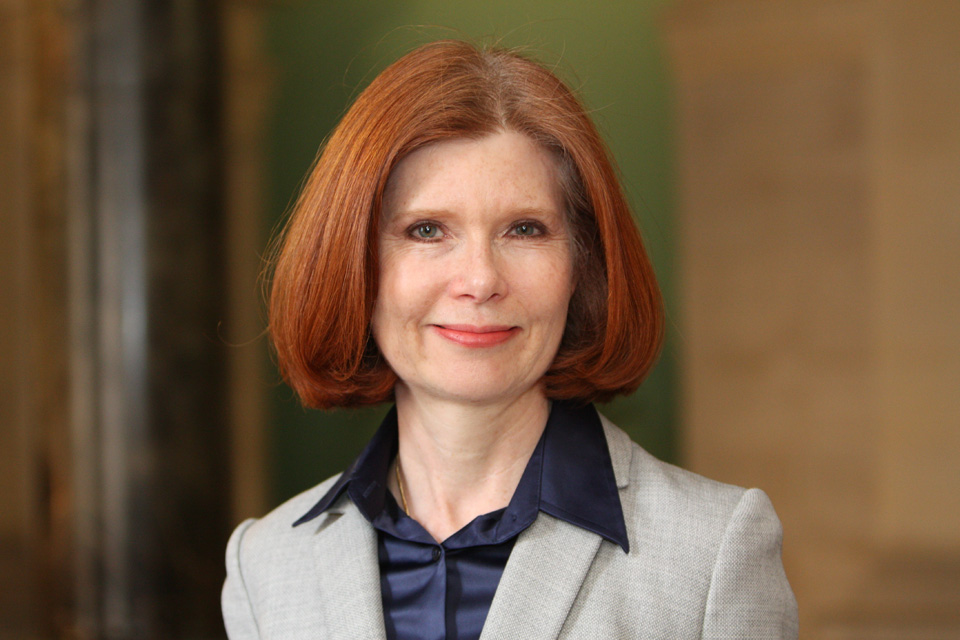

British Ambassador to Norway
- In office July 2014 – 2018
- Monarch: Elizabeth II
- Preceded by: Jane Owen
- Succeeded by: Richard Wood

British Ambassador to Switzerland and Liechtenstein
- In office 2009–2013
- Monarch: Elizabeth II
- Preceded by: John Nichols
- Succeeded by: David Moran

Personal details
- Born: 21 July 1956 (age 70)
- Education: University of Aberdeen

Sarah Gillett CMG CVO (born 21 July 1956) is a British former diplomat who was British Ambassador to Norway from July 2014 to 2018. She previously served as Ambassador to Switzerland and Liechtenstein from 2009 to 2013.

== Early life ==
Gillett is the daughter of diplomat Sir Michael Gillett.

She was educated at St Antony's School, near Sherborne, Dorset (now Leweston School), and Aberdeen University.

== Career ==
She joined the Diplomatic Service in 1976 and served at Washington, D.C., Paris, Los Angeles, Brasília, Montreal and at the Foreign and Commonwealth Office (FCO). She was Vice-Marshal of the Diplomatic Corps and Director of Protocol at the FCO 2006–09, and Ambassador to Switzerland and concurrently to Liechtenstein 2009–13. She was Ambassador to Norway from August 2014 to summer 2018.

== Honours ==
Gillett was appointed MVO in 1986, CMG in the 2009 Birthday Honours and raised to CVO in December 2009 at the end of her appointment as Vice-Marshal of the Diplomatic Corps.

Diplomatic posts
Preceded by John Nichols	Ambassador to Switzerland and Liechtenstein; 2009–2013	Succeeded by David Moran
Preceded by Jane Owen	Ambassador to Norway; 2014–2018	Succeeded by Richard Wood
