= Trafalgar Square Christmas tree =

Public tree in London, England

Coordinates: 51.5082°N 0.1281°W

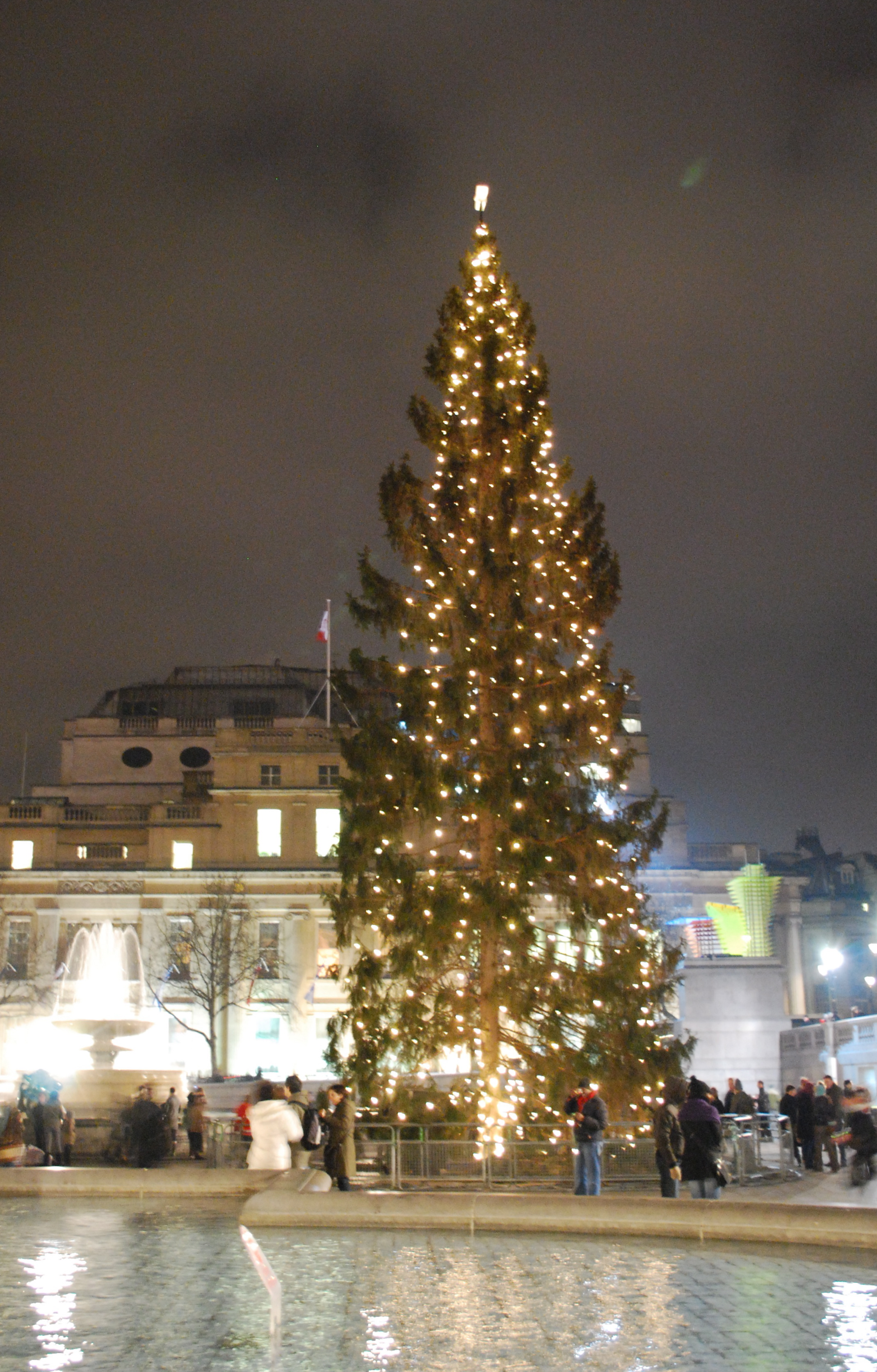
The Trafalgar Square Christmas tree in 2008

The Trafalgar Square Christmas tree is a Christmas tree given to the people of London by the city of Oslo each year since 1947. The tree is prominently displayed in Trafalgar Square from the beginning of December until 6 January.

== History ==
Since 1947, Norway has gifted a Christmas tree for Trafalgar Square as a token of gratitude for British support to Norway during the Second World War. The tree has provided a central focus for the Trafalgar Square traditional carol-singing programme, performed by different groups raising money for voluntary or charitable organisations.

The tree remains until just before the Twelfth Night of Christmas, when it is taken down for recycling. The tree is chipped and composted, to make mulch.

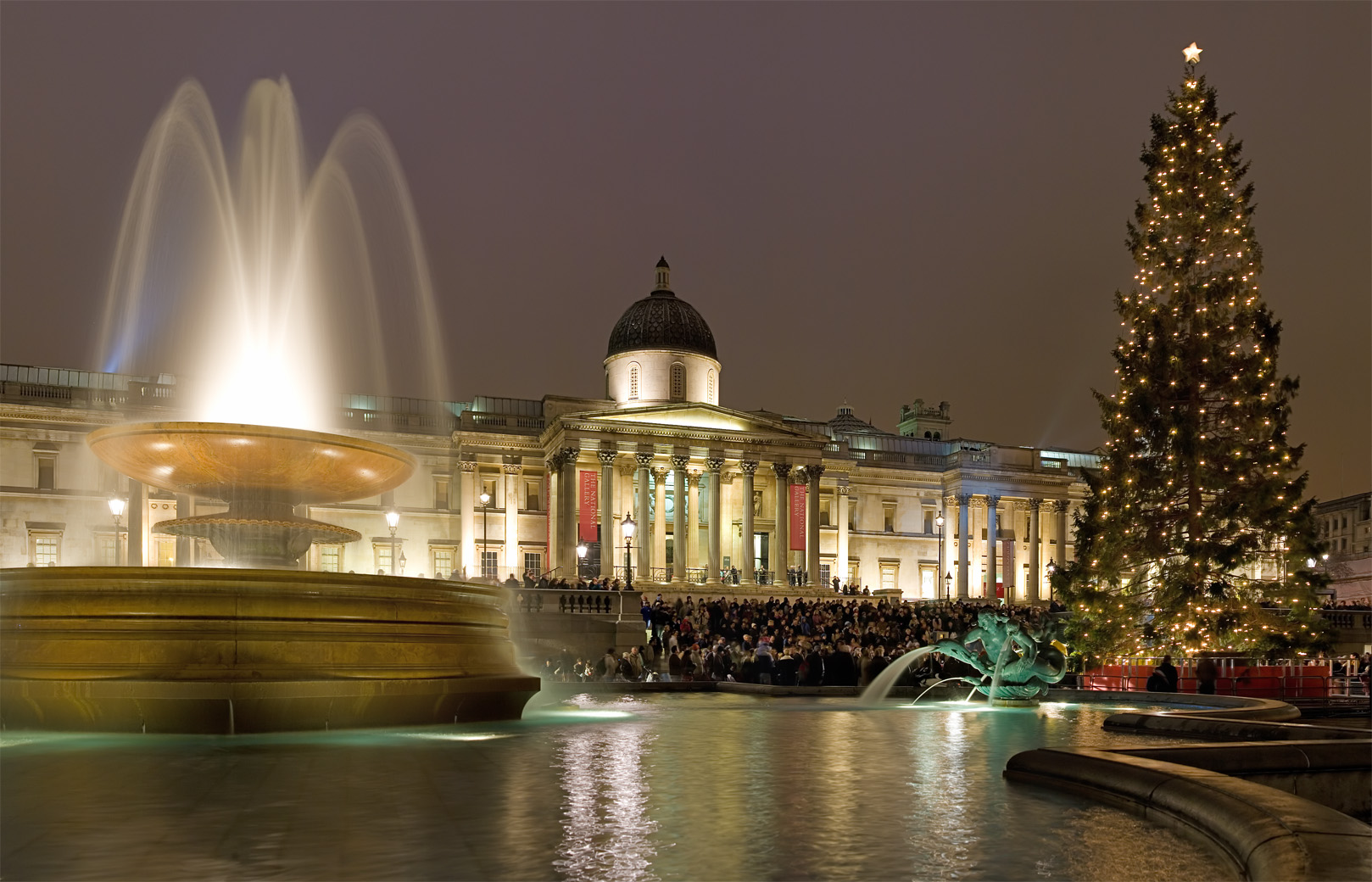
The tree in the square in 2006

The very first Trafalgar Christmas tree from Norway appeared in 1942. A Norwegian commando, Mons Urangsvåg, had arrived in London shortly before Christmas with two spruce trees, felled during a raid on Stord, an island off the west coast of Norway between Bergen and Haugesund. One of the trees was intended as a gift to the Norwegian king, Haakon VII, who was in exile in Britain, but the other was erected in Trafalgar Square by a group of officers from British naval intelligence and a couple of Norwegian commandos after a dinner at the Savoy. One of the naval intelligence officers was Commander Ian Fleming and another was Lieutenant Commander Norman Denning.

== Tree ==
The Trafalgar Square Christmas tree is typically a 50- to 60-year-old Norway spruce, generally over 20 metres (66 ft) tall. The tree is cut in Norway some time in November during a ceremony attended by the British Ambassador to Norway, Mayor of Oslo, and Lord Mayor of Westminster. After the tree is cut, it is shipped to the UK by boat across the sea. At one time it was shipped to Felixstowe free of charge by a cargo ship of the Fred Olsen Line. As of at least 2007, the tree was shipped across the North Sea to Immingham by DFDS Tor Line. As of 2018, it has been the responsibility of Radius Group, to transport, guard and erect the tree in Trafalgar Square.

The Trafalgar Square tree is decorated in a traditional Norwegian style and adorned with 500 white lights. In 2008, the tree used low-wattage halogen bulbs which used 3.5 kW of power.

At the base of the tree stands a plaque, bearing the words:

This tree is given by the city of Oslo as a token of Norwegian gratitude to the people of London for their assistance during the years 1940-45.
A tree has been given annually since 1947.

== Lighting ceremony and carolling ==
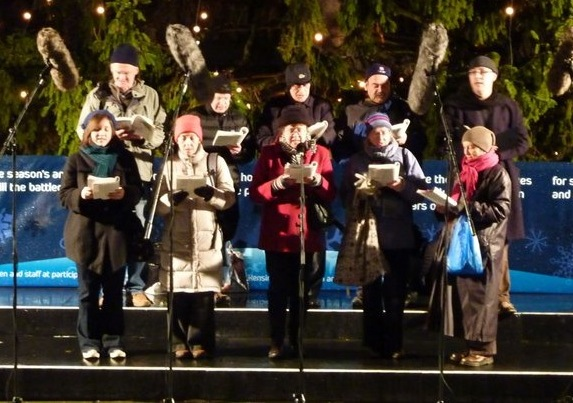
Lewisham Choral Society singing carols in December 2010

The tree lighting ceremony in Trafalgar Square takes place on the first Thursday in December and is attended by thousands of people. The ceremony, led by the Lord Mayor of Westminster, includes a band and choir followed by the switching on of the Christmas lights.

Traditionally, the tree provides a focal point for Christmas carolling groups. For many in London, the tree and the accompanying carolling signals the countdown to Christmas.

Since 2009, the Poetry Society has commissioned new poems annually for display on banners around the base of the tree. In 2010, schoolchildren also performed one of the poems at the lighting-up ceremony.

== Christmas trees given to other cities ==
In addition to the tree sent to London by Oslo, a number of other British cities receive Christmas trees from Norway. Sometimes they are given for similar reasons to the Trafalgar Square tree, or to recognise other long-standing cultural links.

- Lerwick, Shetland. A tree from Maløy is displayed outside Lerwick Town Hall.
- Newcastle upon Tyne. A tree is given by Bergen and is displayed outside Newcastle Civic Centre.
- Sunderland. A tree from comes from Stavanger. In 2015, Stavanger sent a living tree, to eventually take over duties as the permanent Christmas tree
