= Embassy of the United Kingdom, Oslo =

Embassy in Oslo

Coordinates: 59.9146°N 10.7049°E

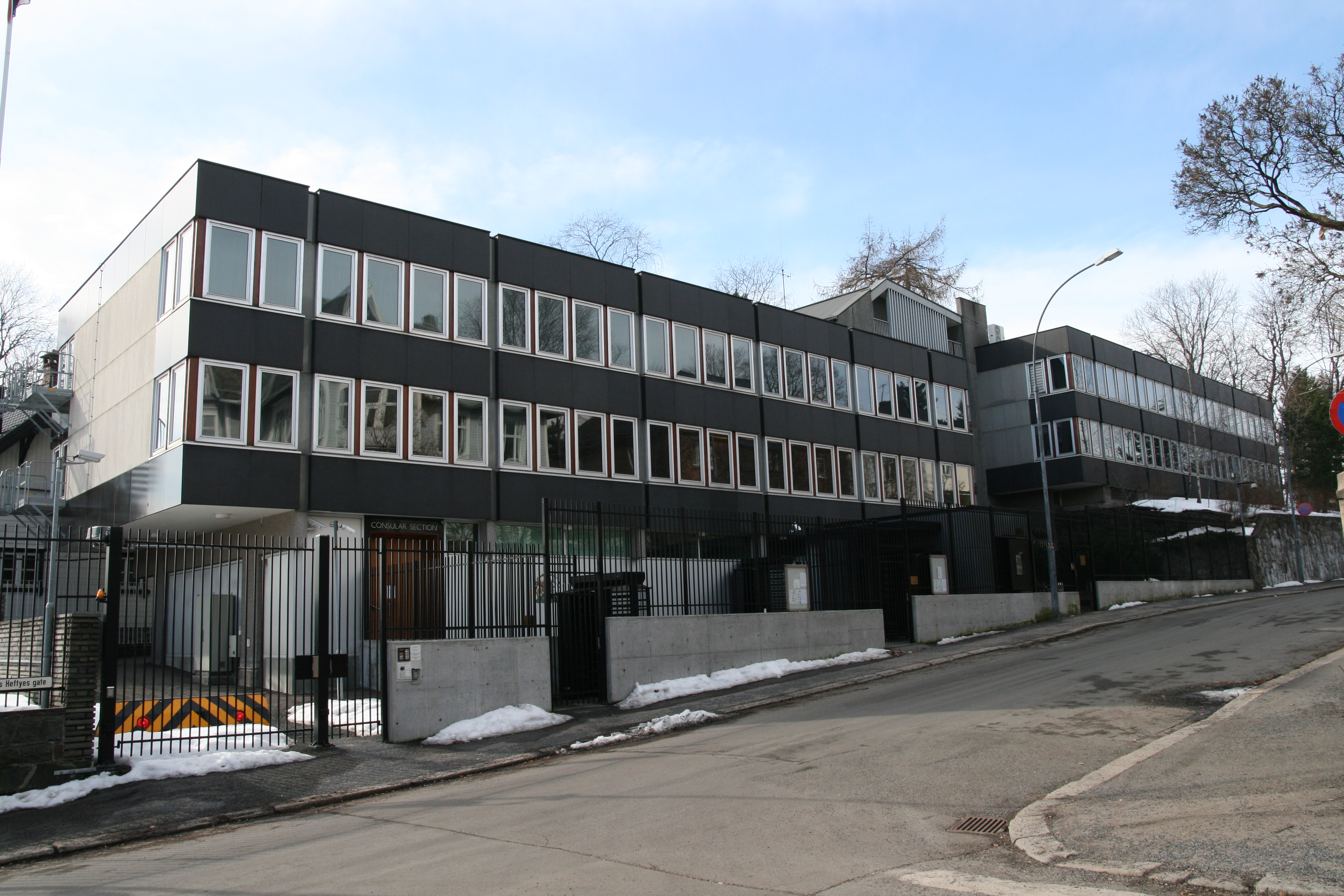
- The Embassy building in Oslo
- Location: Oslo, Norway
- Address: Thomas Heftyes gate 8, 0244 Oslo, Norway
- Ambassador: Jan Thompson
- Website: British Embassy, Oslo

The Embassy of the United Kingdom in Oslo is the chief diplomatic mission of the United Kingdom in Norway. The embassy is located on one of the most expensive streets in Norway, Thomas Heftyes gate, in the Frogner district. The current British ambassador to Norway is Jan Thompson.

== Ambassador's residence ==
The British ambassador's residence in Oslo, Villa Frognæs, is located at Drammensveien 79. Built in 1859, it was designed by Norwegian architects Heinrich Ernst Schirmer and Christian Heinrich Grosch and purchased by the British government in 1906.

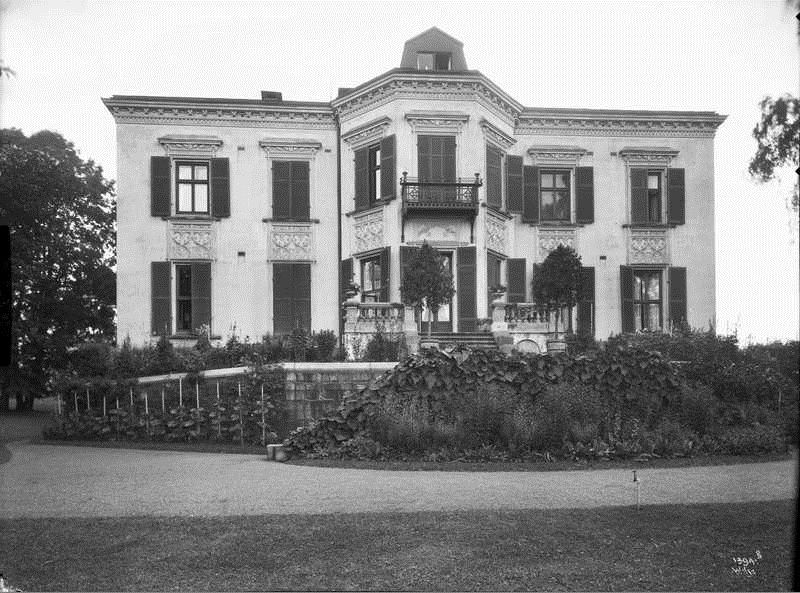
British Ambassador's residence in Oslo, Villa Frognæs, in 1939.

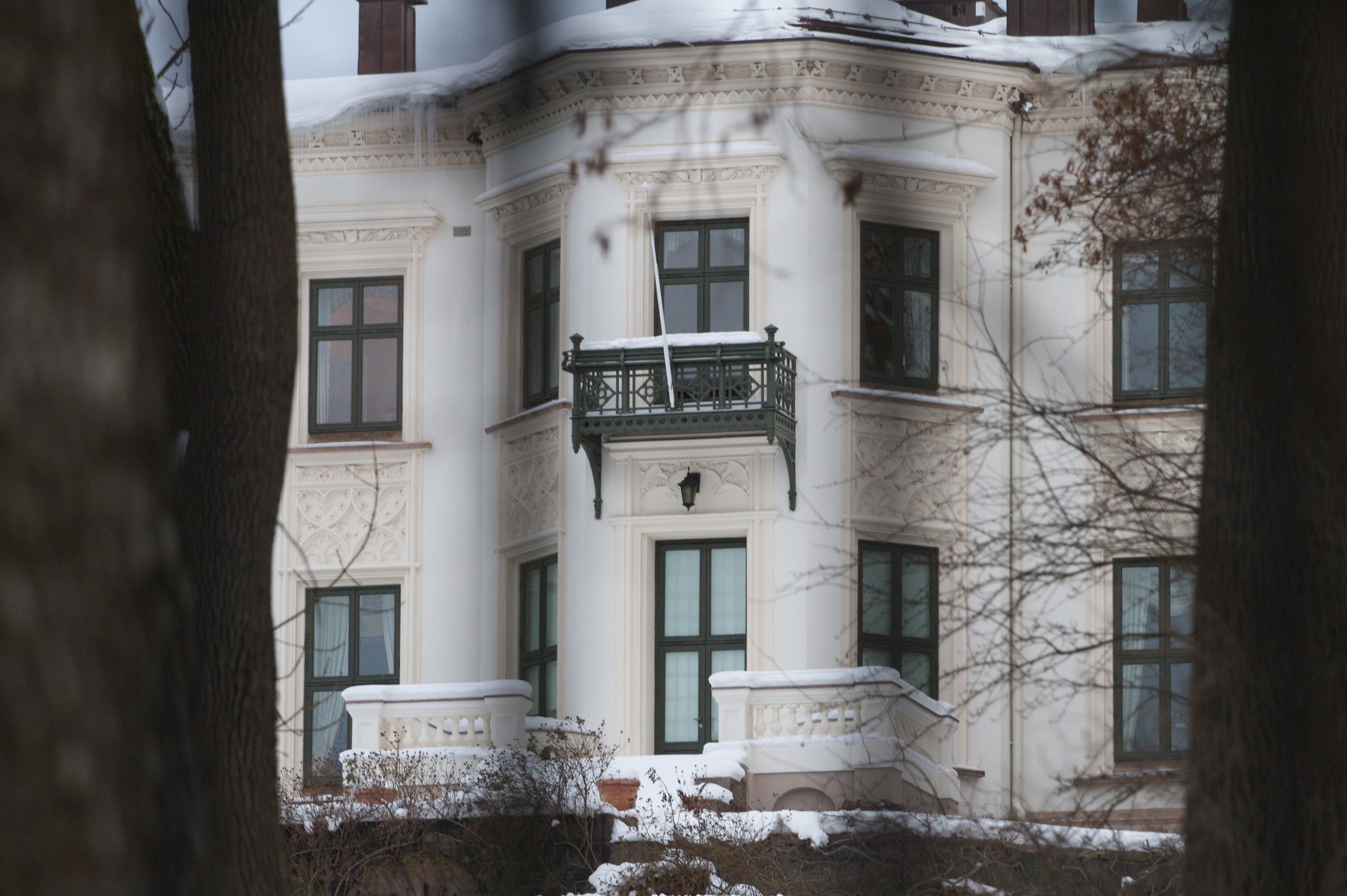
British Ambassador's residence, in 2010.

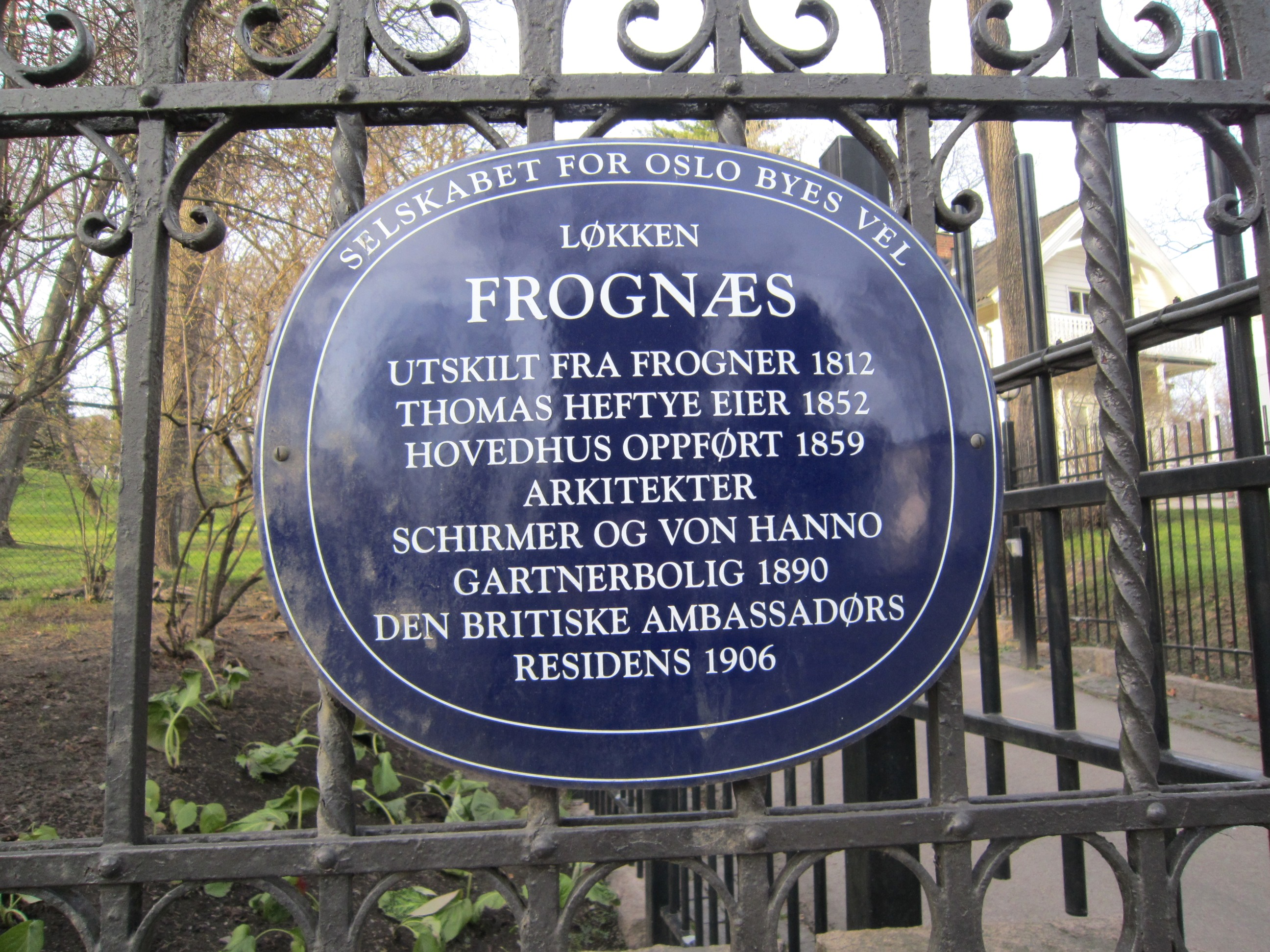
A plaque outside the Ambassador's residence.

== See also ==
- Norway–United Kingdom relations
- List of diplomatic missions in Norway
- List of diplomats of the United Kingdom to Norway
