= List of diplomats of the United Kingdom to Norway =

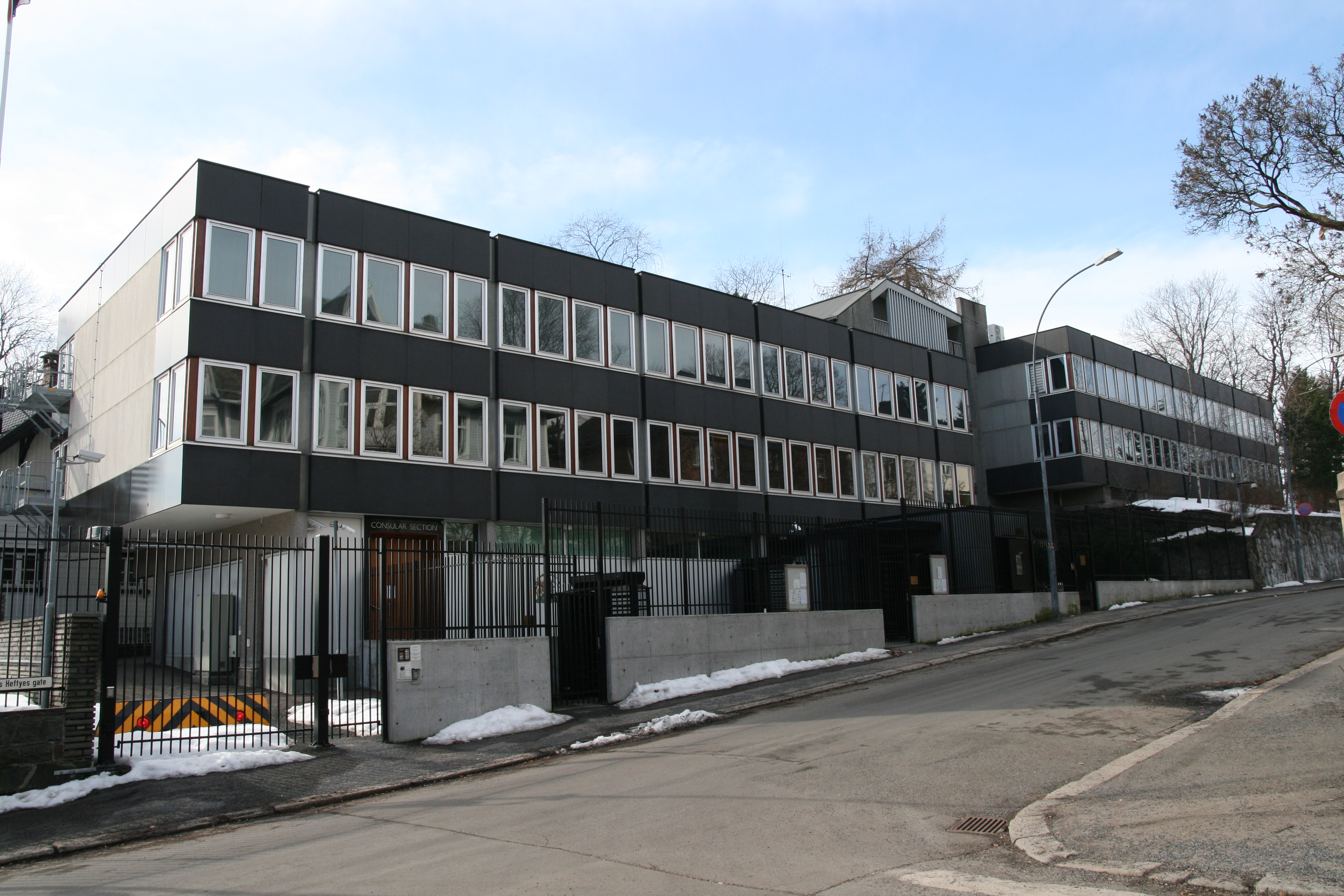
British embassy, Oslo (Thomas Heftyes gate 8)

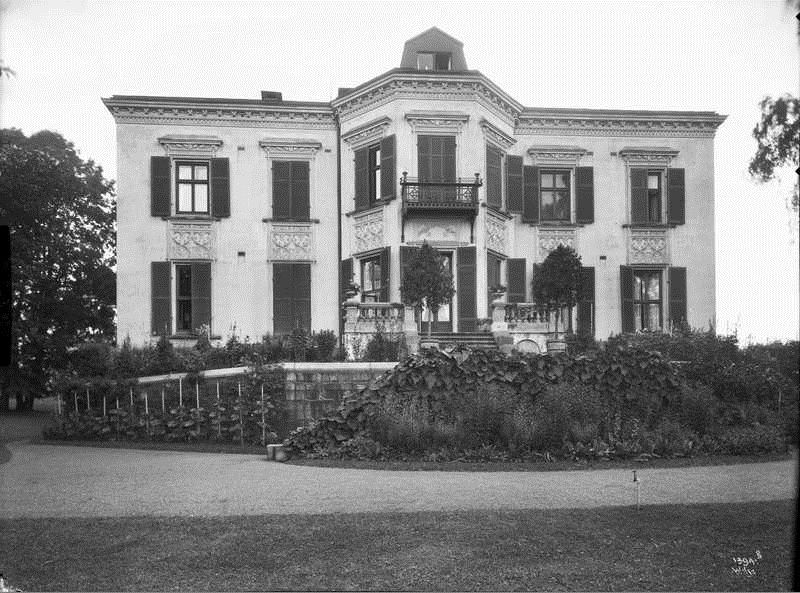
British Ambassador's residence in Oslo, Villa Frognæs, in 1939.

The ambassador of the United Kingdom to Norway is the United Kingdom's foremost diplomatic representative in Norway, and head of the UK's diplomatic mission in Norway. The official title is His Britannic Majesty's Ambassador to the Kingdom of Norway. Norway and the United Kingdom have exchanged diplomats since Norway became independent, when Sir Arthur Herbert was appointed British Minister to Norway on 27 October 1905.

England, and later the United Kingdom, has had a diplomatic and/or consular representation in Norway at least since the 17th century.

== List of heads of mission ==
=== Ministers to Norway ===
- 1905–1910: Sir Arthur Herbert, GCVO
- 1911–1923: Sir Mansfeldt Findlay, GBE, KCMG
- 1923–1929: Rt. Hon. Sir Francis Lindley, GCMG, CB, CBE
- 1929–1934: Sir Charles Wingfield, KCMG
- 1934–1942: Sir Cecil Dormer, KCMG

=== Ambassador to the Norwegian government in exile ===
- 1942–1945: Sir Laurence Collier, KCMG

=== Ambassadors to Norway ===
- 1945–1951: Sir Laurence Collier, KCMG
- 1951–1955: Sir Michael Wright, GCMG
- 1955–1960: Sir Peter Scarlett, KCMG, KCVO
- 1961–1962: Sir John Walker, KCMG
- 1963–1965: Sir Patrick Hancock, GCMG
- 1965–1968: Sir Ian Dixon Scott, KCMG, KCVO, CIE
- 1968–1972: Frank Brenchley, CMG
- 1972–1975: Ralph Selby, CMG
- 1975–1977: Sir Peter Scott, KBE, CMG
- 1978–1980: Sir Archie Lamb, KBE, CMG, DFC
- 1981–1983: Dame Gillian Brown, DCVO, CMG
- 1983–1987: Sir William Bentley, KCMG
- 1987–1990: Sir John Robson, KCMG
- 1990–1994: Sir David Ratford, KCMG, CVO
- 1994–1998: Mark Elliott, CMG
- 1998–2002: Sir Richard Dales, KCVO, CMG
- 2002–2006: Mariot Leslie, CMG
- 2006–2010: David Powell
- 2010–2014: Jane Owen
- 2014–2018: Sarah Gillett
- 2018–2023: Richard Wood
- 2023–present: Jan Thompson, CMG, OBE

== British consuls in Oslo ==
- 1686–? Daniel Butts, honorary
- 1834–1844 George Mygind, honorary
- 1844–? Sir John Rice Crowe (consul-general), honorary
- 1906-1910 Francis Edward Drummond Hay
- 1926–1931 Christopher Lintrup Paus, CBE
