= Adil Tursunov =

Kazakh diplomat (born 1973)

- Әділ Тұрсынов

Ambassador of Kazakhstan to Kingdom of Norway
- Incumbent
- Assumed office 11 January 2023
- President: Kassym-Jomart Tokayev
- Preceded by: Yerkin Akhinzhanov

Deputy Minister of Foreign Affairs of the Republic of Kazakhstan
- In office 8 April 2022 – 11 January 2023
- President: Kassym-Jomart Tokayev
- Preceded by: Akan Rakhmetullin

Advisor to the First President of the Republic of Kazakhstan – Elbasy
- In office June 2021 – April 2022

Advisor to the First President of the Republic of Kazakhstan – Elbasy
- In office March 2019 – June 2021

Personal details
- Born: 5 May 1973 (age 52) Kazakh SSR, Almaty

Adil Kapanuly Tursunov Kazakh: Әділ Кампанұлы Тұрсынов; born 5 May 1973, Almaty) is a Kazakh diplomat, Deputy Minister of Foreign Affairs of the Republic of Kazakhstan. Since January 2023, he has been the Ambassador Extraordinary and Plenipotentiary of the Republic of Kazakhstan to Norway.

== Early life and education ==
Tursunov was born in Almaty in 1973. In 1994 he graduated from the Kazakh State Academy of Management, and in 2001 — the Diplomatic Academy of the Ministry of Foreign Affairs.

== Career ==
From 1994 to 2008, he worked in the structure of the Ministry of Foreign Affairs as a secretary of the Embassy in India and Azerbaijan, a student of the Diplomatic Academy of the Ministry of Foreign Affairs, as well as an adviser-envoy in Singapore.

From 2008 to 2009, he was Deputy Head of the Center for Foreign Policy of the Presidential Administration.

From 2009 to 2016, he worked as Director of the European Department of the Ministry of Foreign Affairs, Adviser-Envoy to Georgia, and later Director of the CIS Department of the Ministry of Foreign Affairs.

From May 2016 to March 2019, he held the position of Head of the Foreign Policy Center of the Presidential Administration of the Republic of Kazakhstan.

On March 28, 2019, to June 2021, he was advisor to Nursultan Nazarbayev, the First President of the Republic of Kazakhstan.

From June 2021 to April 2022, he worked as an assistant to the First President - Head of the Information and Analytical Support Department of the Office.

From April 8, 2022 to January 11, 2023, he was Deputy Minister of Foreign Affairs of the Republic of Kazakhstan.

On January 11, 2023, he was appointed Ambassador Extraordinary and Plenipotentiary of the Republic of Kazakhstan to the Kingdom of Norway.

== Personal life ==
Adil Tursunov's first wife was Aigul Nurieva, divorced. There are two children.

== Awards ==
He was awarded the orders Kurmet and Parasat.
