= Jan Thompson (diplomat) =

British ambassador to Norway (b. 1965)

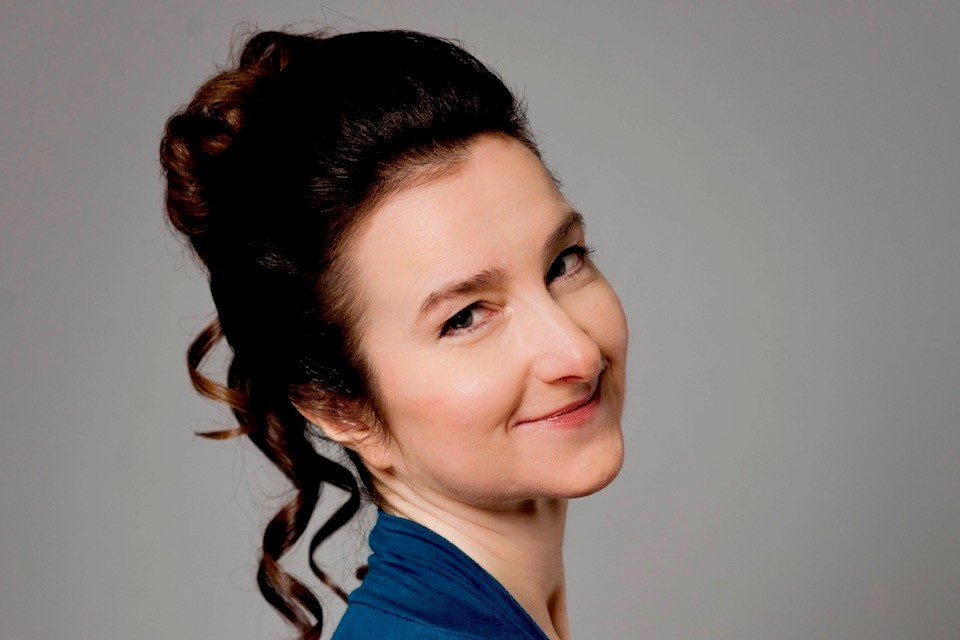
Jan Thompson

Jan Thompson CMG OBE (born 25 August 1965 in Bexleyheath) is a British diplomat, who since April 2023 has served as the British Ambassador to Norway. She served previously as British Ambassador to the Czech Republic from 2013 to 2017, and as British Deputy High Commissioner to India from 2018 to 2023.

== Career ==
Thompson attended Durham University where she studied French and German. She spent two years working for the BBC and then joined the Foreign and Commonwealth Office (FCO) in 1990.

She started her career as desk officer for El Salvador, Honduras and Costa Rica at the Latin America Department, was seconded in 1991 to serve in the German Ministry of Foreign Affairs, and had her first posting as second secretary (political) at the British Embassy in Bonn and Berlin from 1992 to 1994. After a period as head of the Eastern Adriatic Unit at the FCO from 1994 to 1997, she served three years at the UK Permanent Representation to the United Nations New York as First Secretary responsible for the Security Council. Returning to the FCO in 2000, she was deputy head of the United Nations Department (2000–2002), then Head of the Afghanistan Group (2002–2005). A brief spell as head of the British Embassy Office in Phuket, Thailand in 2005 was cut short when she was brought back to help with the 2005 G8 summit in Scotland. She was programme director for the comprehensive spending review at the FCO from 2005 to 2007.

In 2007 she was appointed UK lead negotiator for the International Climate Negotiations leading up to the Poznan 2008 and Copenhagen 2009 United Nations Climate Change Conferences. After briefly leading a strategic defence and security review team at the FCO in 2010, she was head of the Libya unit at the FCO in 2011 (due to the ongoing 2011 Libyan civil war), then project leader for a Future of FCO Climate Diplomacy project.

Thompson was appointed UK Ambassador to the Czech Republic in 2013, serving in Prague until 2018. She was temporarily deputy High Commissioner to Canada in 2018, before she was appointed Deputy High Commissioner to India that year. During her five years in New Delhi, she was acting British High Commissioner for a year.

Thompson was appointed Companion of the Order of St Michael and St George (CMG) in the 2021 New Year Honours for services to British foreign policy.

Diplomatic posts
Preceded by Sian MacLeod	British Ambassador to the Czech Republic; 2013-2017	Succeeded by Nick Archer
Preceded by Richard Wood	British Ambassador to Norway; 2023-present	Succeeded by Incumbent
