= List of equipment of the Royal Cambodian Army =

This is a comprehensive list of the equipment recorded to be in current use by the Royal Cambodian Army - RCA, mothballed equipment will not be included.

== Infantry Equipment ==
=== Personal Gear ===
Family	Image	Color	Manufacturer	Supplier	Status	Notes
Combat Uniforms
BDU			Cambodia		Standard Issue	Produced locally for the RCA. Printed in Woodland for all Commands. Specially printed in Black for the SFC and Armored Command.
BDU		Black	Cambodia		Standard Issue	Produced locally for the RCA. Printed in Woodland for all Commands. Specially printed in Black for the SFC and Armored Command.
PDL			Indonesia		Limited Issue	Donated to the RCA by the TNI-AD. Specially printed in Loreng Darah Mengalir for the SFC.
PDL		N/A	Cambodia		Standard Issue	Produced locally for the RCA. Specially printed pattern for the SFC.
Headgear
Patrol Cap			Cambodia		Standard Issue	Produced locally for the RCA. Printed in Woodland for all Commands.
Boonie Hat			Cambodia		Standard Issue	Produced locally for the RCA. Printed in Woodland for all Commands.
M1		N/A	United States France		Standard Issue	Inherited from the KPRA/CPA. Ceremonial and Training Helmet.
PASGT			United States Cambodia		Standard Issue	Donated to the RCA in 2009. Covered by Helmet Covers printed in Woodland for all Commands. Copies produced locally for the RCA. Covered by Helmet Covers printed in Woodland for all Commands.
MICH 2000		Optional Helmet Cover:	United States Cambodia China			Seen in the 2025 Cambodian-Thai border crisis where RCA troops were seen wearing a Chinese made commercial MICH 2000.
Body Armor
DSS Body Armor			Cambodia		Standard Issue	Produced locally and supplied across Royal Cambodian Armed Forces (RCAF) commands.
Load-bearing vest
Chicom Combat Vest			USSR		Standard Issue	

=== Firearms ===
Family	Image	Variation	Manufacturer	Supplier	Caliber	Status	Notes
Handguns
TT-30		TT-33	USSR		7.62x25mm	Active	Inherited from the KPRA/CPA.
TT-30		Type 54	China		7.62x25mm	Active	Inherited from the KPRA/CPA.
Makarov		PM	USSR		9x18mm	Active	Inherited from the KPRA/CPA.
Makarov		Type 59	China		9x18mm	Active	Inherited from the KPRA/CPA.
QSZ-92		CF-98	China		9x19mm	Active	First seen in use by the RCA during the First Thai-Cambodian Border Dispute.
Semi-Automatic Rifles
SKS		SKS	USSR		7.62x39mm	Active	Inherited from the KPRA/CPA. Ceremonial and Training Rifle.
SKS		Type 56	China		7.62x39mm	Active	Inherited from the KPRA/CPA. Ceremonial and Training Rifle.
Carbines
CQ		CQ-A	China		5.56x45mm	Active	Acquired by the RCA in 2015. Relegated to the SFC and the E-70.
FNC		SS2-V5	Indonesia		5.56x45mm	Active	Donated to the RCA by the TNI-AD. Relegated to the SFC.
K1		K1A	South Korea		5.56x45mm	Active	Acquired by the RCA from between 2007 and 2017. Relegated to the SFC and the E-70.
K2		K2C	South Korea		5.56x45mm	Active	Acquired by the RCA from between 2007 and 2017. Relegated to the SFC and the E-70.
Assault Rifles
CQ		CQ-311	China		5.56x45mm	Limited Use	Inherited from the KPNLAF. Training Rifle.
CQ		CQ-B	China		5.56x45mm	Active	First seen in use by the RCA during the Second Thai-Cambodian Border Dispute.
FNC		Model 2000	Belgium		5.56x45mm	Active	Acquired by the RCA in 1994. Relegated to the SFC.
FNC		SS1-V1	Indonesia		5.56x45mm	Active	Donated to the RCA by the TNI-AD. Relegated to the SFC.
M16		M16A1	United States		5.56x45mm	Active	Inherited from the KPRA/CPA.
M16		M16S1	Singapore		5.56x45mm	Active	Inherited from the KPNLAF.
AK		AK	USSR		7.62x39mm	Active	Inherited from the KPRA/CPA.
AK		AKS	USSR		7.62x39mm	Active	Inherited from the KPRA/CPA.
AK		AKM	USSR		7.62x39mm	Active	Inherited from the KPRA/CPA.
AK		AKMS	USSR		7.62x39mm	Active	Inherited from the KPRA/CPA.
AK		Type 56	China		7.62x39mm	Active	Inherited from the KPRA/CPA.
AK		Type 56-I	China		7.62x39mm	Active	Inherited from the KPRA/CPA.
AK		Type 56-II	China		7.62x39mm	Active	First seen in use by the RCA during the First Thai-Cambodian Border Dispute.
Type 81		Type 81-I	China		7.62x39mm	Limited Use	Donated to the RCA in 2015. Training Rifle.
Machine Guns
RPD		RPD	USSR		7.62x39mm	Active	Inherited from the KPRA/CPA.
RPD		Type 56	China		7.62x39mm	Active	Inherited from the KPRA/CPA.
RPK		RPK	USSR		7.62x39mm	Active	Inherited from the KPRA/CPA.
RPK		TUL-1	Vietnam		7.62x39mm	Limited Use	Inherited from the KPRA/CPA.
Type 81		Type 81 LMG	China		7.62x39mm	Limited Use	First seen in use by the RCA during the Second Thai-Cambodian Border Dispute.
M60		M60	United States		7.62x51mm	Limited Use	Inherited from the KPRA/CPA.
MAG		GPMG	Singapore		7.62x51mm	Limited Use	Inherited from the KPNLAF.
PK		M84	Yugoslavia		7.62x54mmR	Limited Use	Acquired by the RCA in 2010.
PK		PKM	USSR		7.62x54mmR	Active	Inherited from the KPRA/CPA.
PK		Type 80	China		7.62x54mmR	Active	First seen in use by the RCA during the First Thai-Cambodian Border Dispute.
SG-43		Type 57	China		7.62x54mmR	Limited Use	Inherited from the KPRA/CPA.

=== Grenade Launchers ===
Family	Image	Variation	Manufacturer	Supplier	Caliber	Status	Notes
Underbarrel Grenade Launchers
LG2		LG2	China		40mm	Active	First seen in use by the RCA during the First Thai-Cambodian Border Dispute.
M203		M203SG	Singapore		40mm	Limited Use	Inherited from the KPNLAF.
Standalone Grenade Launchers
QLZ-87		Type 87	China		35mm	Active	First seen in use by the RCA during the Second Thai-Cambodian Border Dispute.
LG3		LG3	China		40mm	Active	First seen in use by the RCA during the Second Thai-Cambodian Border Dispute.
LG4		LG4	China		40mm	Active	First seen in use by the RCA during the Second Thai-Cambodian Border Dispute.
LG5		LG5	China		40mm	Active	First seen in use by the RCA during the Second Thai-Cambodian Border Dispute.
M79		M79	United States		40mm	Limited Use	Inherited from the KPRA/CPA.

=== Specialized Weaponry ===
Family	Image	Variation	Manufacturer	Supplier	Caliber	Status	Notes
Heavy Machine Guns
DShK		DShKM	USSR		12.7x108mm	Active	Inherited from the KPRA/CPA.
DShK		Type 54	China		12.7x108mm	Active	Inherited from the KPRA/CPA.
W85		W85	China		12.7x108mm	Active	First seen in use by the RCA during the First Thai-Cambodian Border Dispute.
QJZ-89		QJZ-89	China		12.7x108mm	Active	First seen in use by the RCA during the First Thai-Cambodian Border Dispute.
Anti-Materiel Rifles
LR2		LR2	China		12.7x108mm	Active	First seen in use by the RCA during the Second Thai-Cambodian Border Dispute.
QBU-10		QBU-10	China		12.7x108mm	Active	First seen in use by the RCA during the Second Thai-Cambodian Border Dispute.
Anti-Armor
RPG-2		B-40	North Vietnam		40mm	Active	Inherited from the KPRA/CPA and the KPNLAF.
RPG-2		RPG-2	USSR		40mm	Active	Inherited from the KPRA/CPA and the KPNLAF.
RPG-2		M13 Type 56	China		40mm	Active	Inherited from the KPRA/CPA and the KPNLAF.
RPG-7		ATGL-L	Bulgaria		40mm	Active	Acquired by the RCA in 2010.
RPG-7		RPG-7	USSR		40mm	Active	Inherited from the KPRA/CPA.
RPG-7		Type 69	China		40mm	Active	Inherited from the KPRA/CPA.
PF-89		Type 89	China		80mm	Active	First seen in use by the RCA during the First Thai-Cambodian Border Dispute.

== Vehicles ==
=== Trucks and Support Vehicles ===
Family	Image	Variation	Manufacturer	Supplier	Quantity	Status	Notes
Utility Vehicles
BJ2022		BJ2022	China		30	Active	Donated to the RCA in 2010.
BJ80		BJ80	China		55	Active	Donated the RCA in 2020.
EQ2050		EQ2050	China		20	Active	Donated the RCA in 2020.
K-131		K-131	South Korea		50	Active	Donated to the RCA in 2012 & 2017.
K-311		K-311	South Korea		50	Active	Donated to the RCA in 2012 & 2017.
SsangYong Rexton		KG Mobility Rexton	South Korea		N/A	Active	
Ambulances
NJ2045/2046		NJ2045	China		20	Active	Donated to the RCA in 2010.
NJ2045/2046		NJ2046	China		5	Active	Donated to the RCA in 2010.
Cargo Trucks
EQ2162		EQ2162N	China		50	Active	Donated to the RCA in 2015.
EQ5118		EQ5118XZS6D16	China		200	Active	Donated to the RCA in 2010.
Genlyon		Genlyon C100	China		80	Active	Acquired by the RCA in 2020.
Genpaw		Genpaw	China		170	Active	Acquired by the RCA in 2020.
KamAZ-4310		KamAZ-4310	USSR	Russia	N/A	Active	Inherited from the KPRA/CPA.
KamAZ-43114		KamAZ-43114	Russia	Russia	N/A	Active	Acquired by the RCA in 2011 for Peacekeeping Operations
M35		K-511	South Korea		200	Active	Donated to the RCA in 2012 & 2017.
M35		M35A2	United States		67	Active	Donated to the RCA in 2008 & 2009.
M39		K-711	South Korea		50	Active	Donated to the RCA in 2010.
M809		M813	United States		N/A	Active	Donated to the RCA in 2000.
M809		M814	United States		N/A	Active	Donated to the RCA in 2000.
Mighty		EX8	South Korea		230	Active	Acquired by the RCA in 2023.
Tatra 815		T-815 VVN	Czechoslovakia	Czechia	N/A	Active	Acquired by the RCA in 2012. First seen transporting BVP-1s.
Ural-4320		Ural-4320	USSR		N/A	Active	Inherited from the KPRA/CPA.
ZIL-131		ZIL-131	USSR		N/A	Active	Inherited from the KPRA/CPA.
Prime Movers
HOWO A7		HOWO A7	China		N/A	Active	Donated to the RCA in 2010.
M809		M818	United States		N/A	Active	Donated to the RCA in 2000.
MAZ-537		MAZ-537G	USSR	Bulgaria Poland	3	Active	2 were acquired by the RCA in 2010. 1 was acquired by the RCA in 1994.
Armored Recovery Vehicles
BTS		BTS-4A	USSR		4	Active	Inherited from the KPRA/CPA.
BTS		Type 73	China		2	Active	Donated to the RCA in 2015. Training Vehicles.
WZT		WZT-1	Poland	Poland	2	Active	Acquired by the RCA in 1994.
WZT		WZT-2	Poland	Poland	2	Active	Acquired by the RCA in 1994.

=== Armored Fighting Vehicles ===
Family	Image	Variation	Manufacturer	Supplier	Quantity	Status	Notes
Main Battle Tanks
T-54/T-55		T-54M	USSR		100	Active	Inherited from the KPRA/CPA.
T-54/T-55		T-55A	Czechoslovakia Poland	Serbia	60	Active	Acquired by the RCA in 2010.
T-54/T-55		T-55A	Poland	Poland	50	Active	Acquired by the RCA in 1994. Mistaken for T-55AM-2s.
T-54/T-55		T-55AM1	Czechoslovakia	Czechia	40	Active	Acquired by the RCA in 1994. Mistaken for T-55AM-2s.
T-54/T-55		Type 59	China		5	Active	Donated to the RCA in 2015. Training Vehicles.
T-54/T-55		Type 59D	China		+39	Active	Acquired by the RCA in 2026. Roughly 93 to 96 are planned to be delivered in total.
Light Tanks
PT-76		PT-76A	USSR		N/A	Limited Use	Inherited from the KPRA/CPA.
PT-76		PT-76B	USSR		N/A	Limited Use	Inherited from the KPRA/CPA.
Infantry Fighting Vehicles
BMP-1		BMP-1	USSR		10	Active	Inherited from the KPRA/CPA.
BMP-1		BVP-1	Czechoslovakia	Czechia Slovakia	61 8	Active	Acquired by the RCA in 2012.
Armoured Reconnaissance Vehicles
BB-60		BB-60	Cambodia		1	Limited Use	Built by a Vietnamese mechanic in 2014 for the E-70 as well as fixing Brigade's BRDM-2s and BTR-60PBs. The origins of the name "BB-60" given to this vehicle is not known.
BRDM-2		BRDM-2	USSR	USSR	30	Active	Inherited from the KPRA/CPA.
BRDM-2		BRDM-2	USSR	Bulgaria	4	Active	Acquired by the RCA in 2010.
Armored Personnel Carriers
BTR-60		BTR-60PB	USSR	USSR	40	Active	Inherited from the KPRA/CPA.
BTR-60		BTR-60PB	USSR	Bulgaria Ukraine	40 40	Active	Acquired by the RCA in 2010.
BTR-152		BTR-152	USSR		2	Limited Use	Inherited from the KPRA/CPA.
OT-64		OT-93	Czechoslovakia	Czechia	26	Limited Use	Inherited from the GRK. in the 2000s. Mistaken for OT-64s.
Type 63		Type 63	China		4	Active	Donated to the RCA in 2015. Training Vehicles.
ZFB-05		ZFB-05A	China		15	Active	Donated to the RCA in 2019. Mistaken for Tigr. Relegated to the E-70.

== Artillery ==
=== Close Fire Support ===
Family	Image	Variation	Manufacturer	Supplier	Caliber	Status	Notes
Recoilless Rifles
M20		Type 56	China		75mm	Active	Inherited from the KPRA/CPA.
B-10		Type 65-I	China		82mm	Active	Inherited from the KPRA/CPA.
B-10		Type 78	China		82mm	Active	Donated to the RCA in 2020.
Mortars
Mle 1935		Type 63	China		60mm	Active	Inherited from the KPRA/CPA.
PP89		Type 89	China		60mm	Active	Donated to the RCA in 2015.
PP93		Type 93	China		60mm	Active	Donated to the RCA in 2015.
Mle 27/31		BM-37	USSR		82mm	Limited	Inherited from the KPRA/CPA.
Mle 27/31		BM-41	USSR		82mm	Active	Inherited from the KPRA/CPA.
W87		Type W87	China		82mm	Active	Donated to the RCA in 2015.
Type 71		Type 71	China		100mm	Active	Donated to the RCA in 2015.
W86		Type W86	China		120mm	Active	Donated to the RCA in 2015.

=== Towed Artillery ===
Family	Image	Variation	Manufacturer	Supplier	Caliber	Quantity	Status	Notes
Anti-Tank Guns
M-1943		ZiS-2	USSR		57mm	N/A	Active	Inherited from the KPRA/CPA. Training Piece.
M-1942		ZiS-3	USSR		76.2mm	N/A	Active	Inherited from the KPRA/CPA. Training Piece.
D-44		D-44	USSR		85mm	N/A	Active	Inherited from the KPRA/CPA. Training Piece.
D-44		Type 56	China		85mm	N/A	Active	Inherited from the KPRA/CPA. Training Piece.
Howitzers
M101		M101A1	United States		105mm	N/A	Limited Use	Inherited from the KPRA/CPA. Ceremonial Piece.
M-1938		M-30	USSR		122mm	N/A	Limited Use	Inherited from the KPRA/CPA. Training Piece.
M-1938		Type 54	China		122mm	N/A	Limited Use	Inherited from the KPRA/CPA. Training Piece.
D-30		D-30A	USSR		122mm	N/A	Active	Inherited from the KPRA/CPA.
D-30		Type 96	China		122mm	N/A	Active	Donated to the RCA in 2015.
M-1954		M-46	USSR		130mm	N/A	Active	Inherited from the KPRA/CPA.
M-1954		Type 59-I	China		130mm	N/A	Limited Use	Inherited from the KPRA/CPA.
M-1955		D-20	USSR		152.4mm	N/A	Limited Use	Inherited from the KPRA/CPA.
M-1955		Type 66	China		152.4mm	N/A	Limited Use	Donated to the RCA in 2015.

=== Self-Propelled Artillery ===
Family	Image	Variation	Manufacturer	Supplier	Caliber	Quantity	Status	Notes
Self-Propelled Howitzers
SH-1		SH-1	China		155mm	18	Active	Acquired by the RCA in 2022.
Self-Propelled Rocket Launchers
BM-21		BM-21	USSR		122mm	8	Active	Inherited from the KPRA/CPA.
BM-21		RM-70	Czechoslovakia	Czechia Slovakia	122mm	20 5	Active	Acquired by the RCA in 2012.
BM-21		Type 81	China		122mm	8	Active	Donated to the RCA in 2015.
BM-21		Type 90B	China		122mm	8	Active	Acquired by the RCA in 2022.
PHL-03		AR-2	China		300mm	6	Limited Use	Acquired by the RCA in 2022.

== Air Defense ==
=== Anti-Air Autocannon System ===
Family	Image	Variation	Manufacturer	Supplier	Caliber	Status	Notes
Autocannons
ZPU		ZPU-1	USSR		14.5mm	Active	Inherited from the KPRA/CPA.
ZPU		ZPU-2	USSR		14.5mm	Active	Inherited from the KPRA/CPA.
ZU-23-2		ZU-23-2	USSR		23mm	Active	Inherited from the KPRA/CPA.
M-1939		Type 55	China		37mm	Active	Inherited from the KPRA/CPA.
M-1939		Type 65	China		37mm	Active	Some were inherited from the KPRA/CPA. Some were donated to the RCA in 2015.
S-60		Type 59	China		57mm	Limited Use	Inherited from the KPRA/CPA.

=== Anti-Air Missile System ===
Family	Image	Variation	Manufacturer	Supplier	Quantity	Status	Notes
Surface to Air Missiles
HQ-12		KS-1C	China		1 Battery	Active	Acquired by the RCA in 2023. 4 Launchers.

== Sources ==
- Jones, Richard D.; Ness, Leland S. (2010). Jane's Infantry Weapons 2010–2011 (36th ed.). Surrey: Jane's Information Group. ISBN 978-0-7106-2908-1.
- International Institute for Strategic Studies (2025). The Military Balance 2025. London: Routledge. ISBN 978-1-003-63076-0.
