= Jungle warfare =

Warfare in jungles, forests, or similar environments

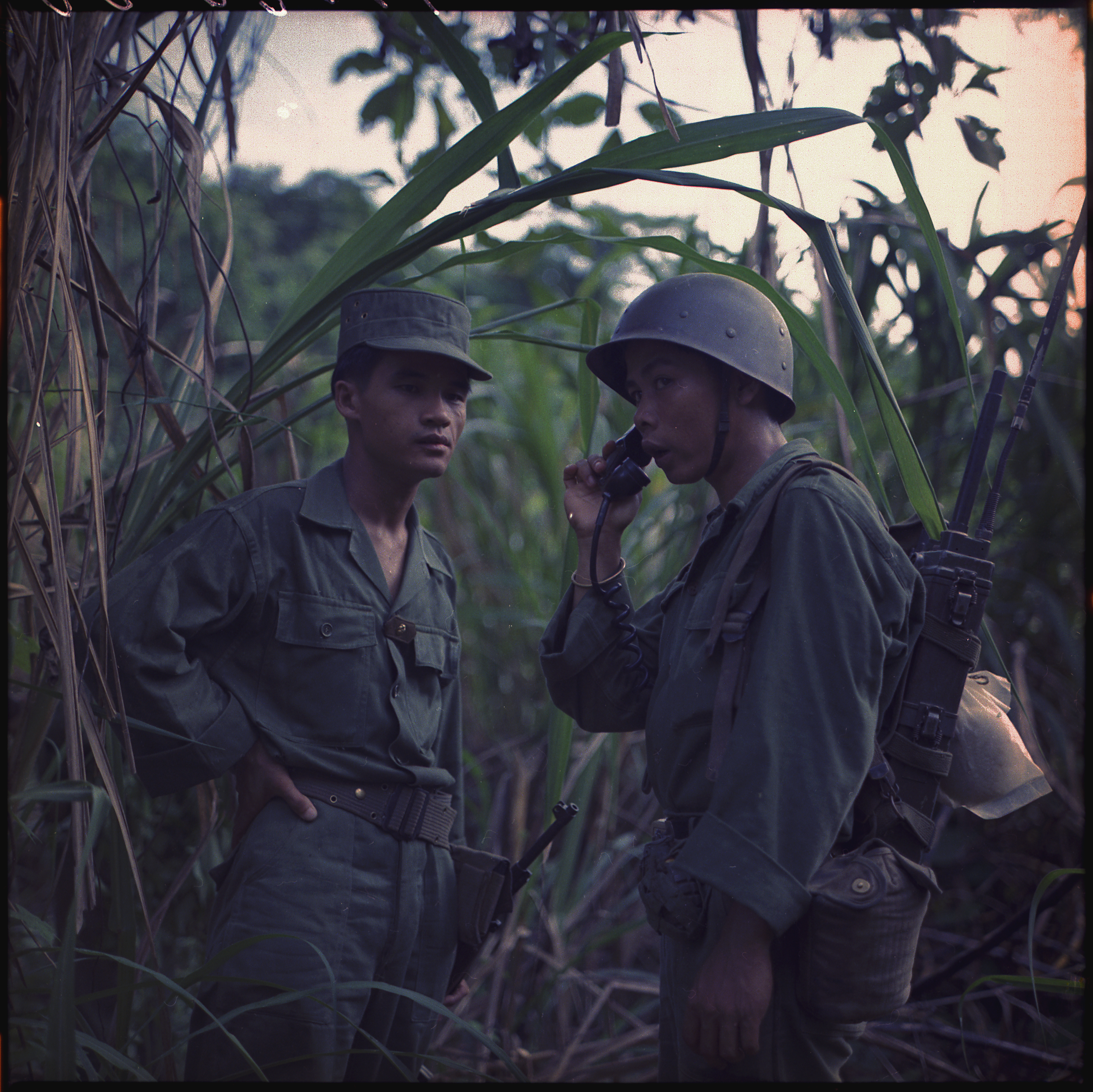
Army of the Republic of Vietnam soldiers training in the jungles of South Vietnam during the Vietnam War in 1962

Jungle warfare or woodland warfare is warfare in forests, jungles, or similar environments. The term encompasses military operations affected by the terrain, climate, vegetation, and wildlife of densely wooded areas, as well as the strategies and tactics used by military forces in these situations and environments.

The jungle has a variety of effects on military operations. Dense vegetation can limit lines of sight and arcs of fire, but can also provide ample opportunity for camouflage and plenty of material with which to build fortifications. Jungle terrain, often without good roads, can be inaccessible to vehicles and so makes logistical supply and transport difficult, which in turn places a premium on air mobility. The problems of transport make engineering resources important as they are needed to improve roads, build bridges and airfields, and improve water supplies. Jungle environments can also be inherently unhealthy, with various tropical diseases that have to be prevented or treated by medical services. The terrain can make it difficult to deploy armoured forces, or any other kind of forces, on a large scale. Successful jungle fighting emphasizes effective small unit tactics and leadership.

Jungle warfare has been the topic of extensive study by military strategists, and was an important part of the planning for both sides in many conflicts, including World War II, the Vietnam War, and the Nicaraguan Revolution.

== History ==
=== Pre-modern ===
Throughout world history, forests have played significant roles in many of the most historic battles. For example, in the Battle of the Teutoburg Forest between the Romans and the Germanic tribes in 9 AD, the Germans used the forest to ambush the Romans. In ancient China, the Chinese Empire planted forests on its strategic borderland to thwart nomadic attacks. For example, the Northern Song dynasty (960–1127) constructed and maintained an extensive defensive forest in present-day Hebei.

In the Amazon rainforest, there were fighting and wars between the neighboring tribes of the Jivaro. Several tribes of the Jivaroan group, including the Shuar, practised headhunting for trophies and headshrinking.

=== World War II ===
==== Conventional jungle warfare ====
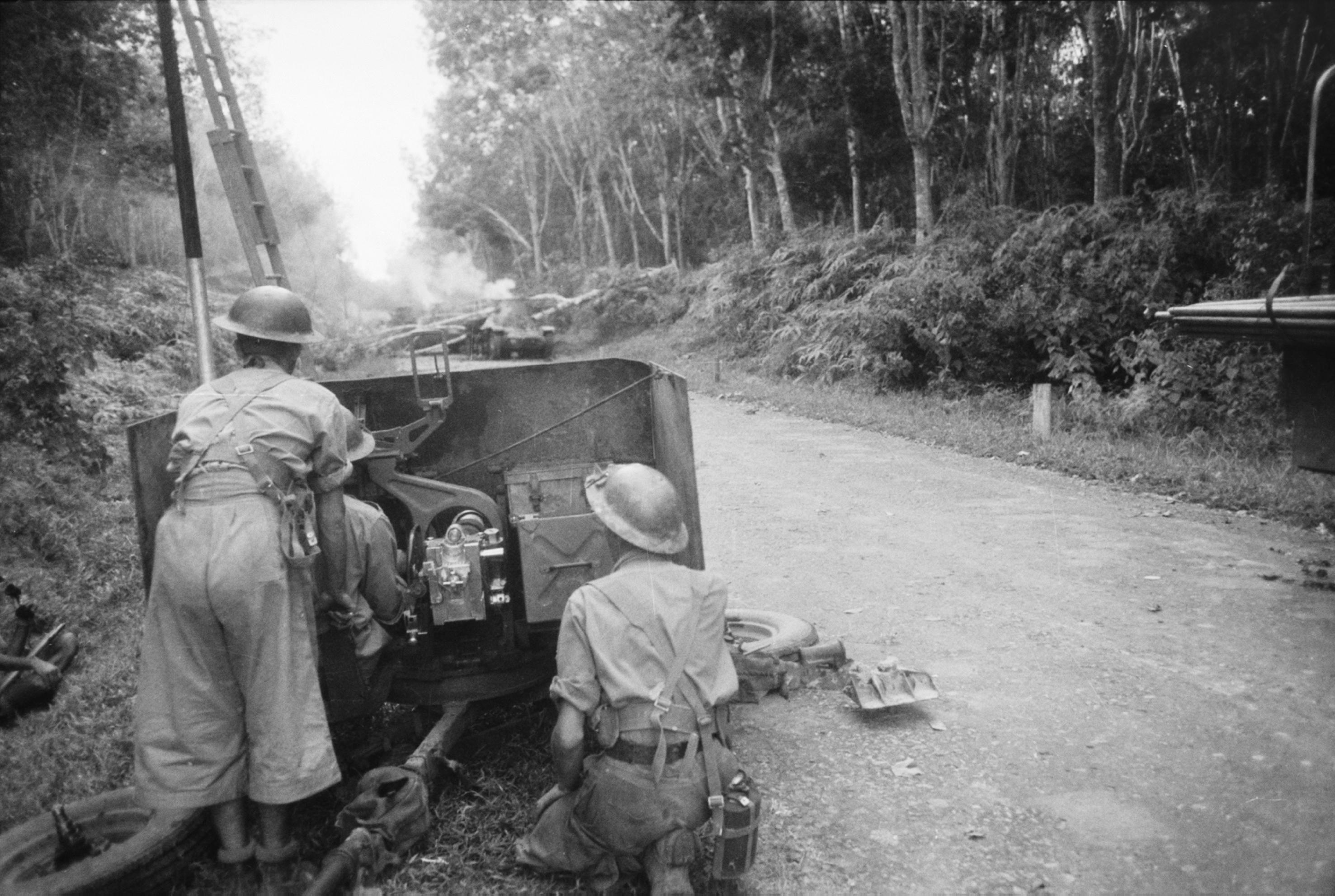
Australian 2-pounder anti-tank gunners firing on Japanese tanks during the Malayan campaign

At the start of Pacific War in the Far East, the Japanese Imperial Forces were able to advance on all fronts. In the Malayan Campaign, time and again they infiltrated through the jungle to bypass static British positions based on road blocks so that they could cut the British supply line and attack their defences from all sides.

In early 1942, the fighting in Burma at the start of the Burma Campaign took on a similar aspect and resulted in one of the longest retreats in British military history. Most members of the British Indian Army left Burma with the belief that the Japanese were unstoppable in the jungle.

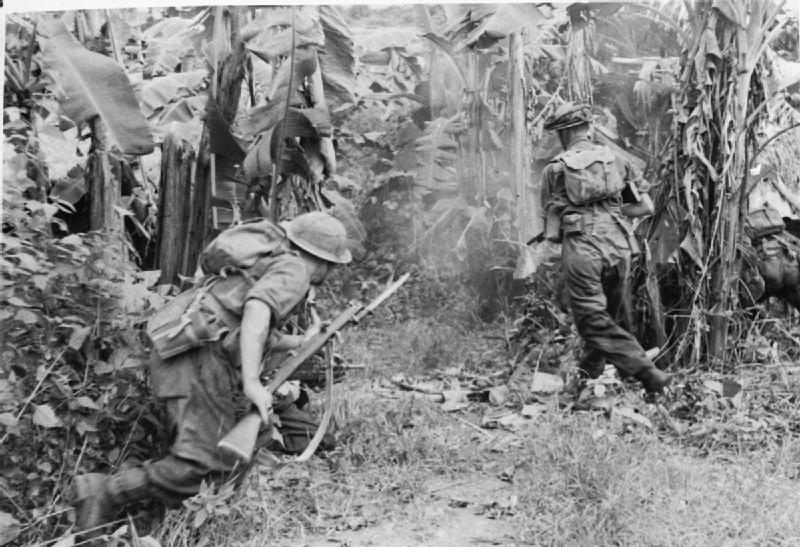
British troops in the 1944 Burma campaign

The Chindits were a special force of 3,500 that in February 1943 launched a deep penetration raid, code-named Operation Longcloth, into Japanese occupied Burma. They went in on foot and used mules to carry supplies. The operation was not a military success but was a propaganda boost for the Allies because it showed that Allied forces could successfully move and fight in jungle terrain well away from roads. On the back of the propaganda success, Orde Wingate, the eccentric commander of the Chindits, was given the resources to increase his command to divisional size and the USAAF supplied the 1st Air Commando Group to support his operations. The availability of air transport revolutionized Wingate's operational choices. In February 1944, Operation Thursday was launched, and air transport support supplied 1st Air to allow the Chindits to set up air supplied bases deep behind enemy lines from which aggressive combat patrols could be sent out to interdict Japanese supply lines and disrupt rear echelon forces. That in turn forced the Japanese 18th Division to pull frontline troops from the battle against X Force, which was advancing through Northern Burma, to protect the men building the Ledo Road. When the Japanese closed on a base and got within artillery range, the base could be abandoned and then set up in another remote location. The ability to sustain the bases that relied totally on air power in the coming decades would prove a template for many similar operations.

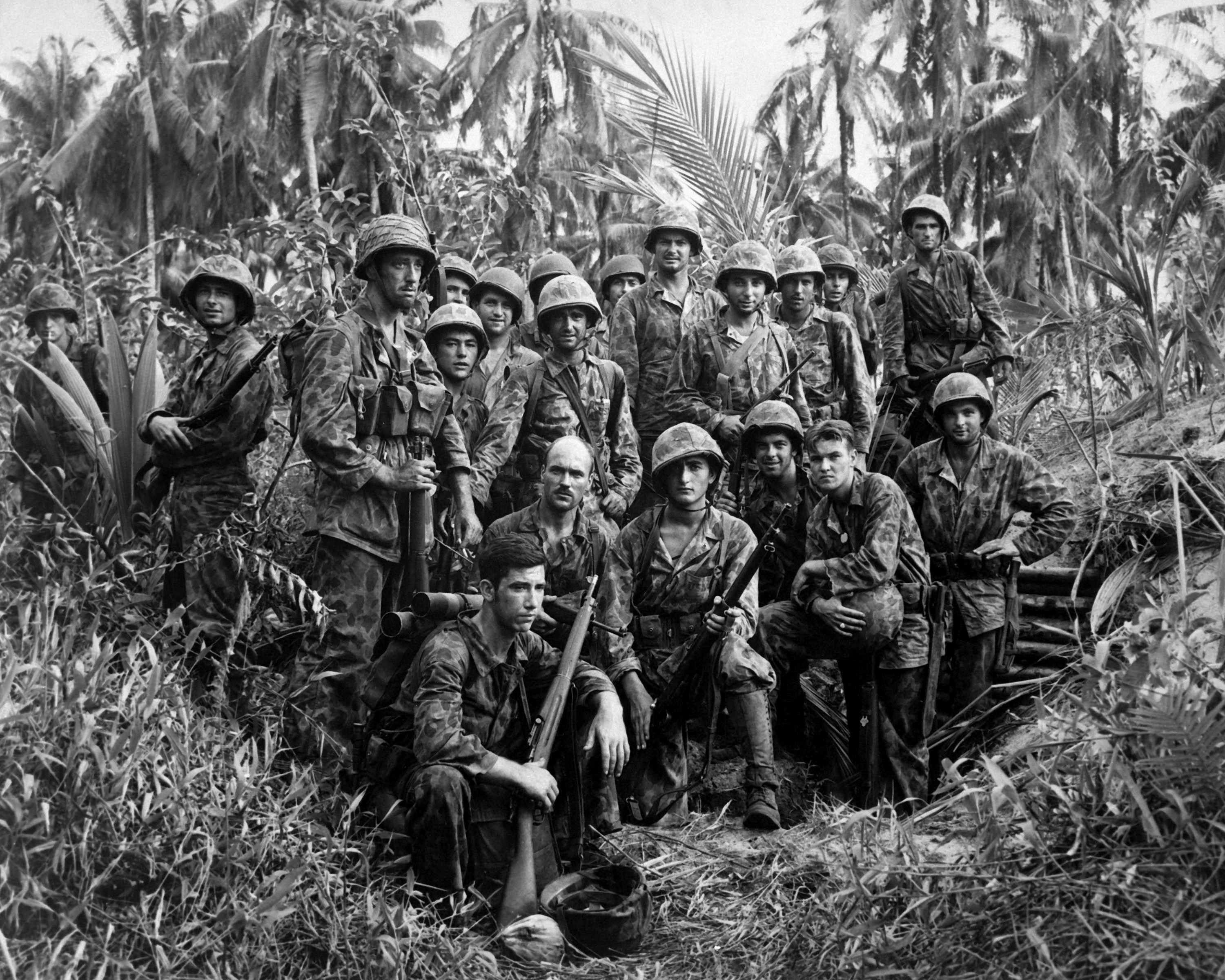
U.S. Marine Raiders in front of a Japanese dugout on Cape Totkina, Solomon Islands during the Bougainville campaign

After the first Chindits expedition, thanks to the training the regular forces were receiving and the example of the Chindits and new divisional tactics, the regular units of the Fourteenth Army started to get the measure of both the jungle and the enemy. Under General Slim, the attitude of training was that the jungle was not another enemy but could be used to their advantage. Comprehensive protection against disease particularly malaria, was instigated. There was also a change in the attitude to the weather; previously both sides stopped operations in the monsoon season but the Commonwealth troops were now expected to move and fight during the wet season.

When the Japanese launched their late 1943 Arakan offensive they infiltrated Allied lines to attack the 7th Indian Infantry Division from the rear, overrunning the divisional HQ. Unlike previous occasions on which this had happened, the Allied forces stood firm against the attack and supplies were dropped to them by parachute. The Japanese travelled lightly intending to resupply from captured material. In the Battle of the Admin Box from 5 February to 23 February, the Japanese were unable to comprehensively break into the heavily defended box that contained the divisional supplies while the defenders were able to resupply and bring tanks into operation. The Japanese switched their attack to the central front, but again, the British fell back into defensive box of Imphal and the Kohima redoubt. In falling back to the defensive positions around Imphal, the leading British formations found their retreat cut by Japanese forces, but unlike previously, they took that attitude that the Japanese who were behind them were just as cut off as the British. The situation maps of the fighting along the roads leading to Imphal resembled a slice of marble cake, as both sides used the jungle to outflank each other. Another major change by the British was that use of air support both as an offensive weapon to replace artillery and as a logistical tool to transport men and equipment. For example, the 5th Indian Infantry Division was airlifted straight from the now-quieter Arakan front up to the central front and were in action within days of arriving. By the end of the campaigning season, both Kohima and Imphal had been relieved, and the Japanese were in full retreat.

The lessons learned in Burma on how to fight in the jungle and how to use air transport to move troops around would lay the foundations of how to conduct large-scale jungle campaigns in future wars.

==== Unconventional jungle warfare ====
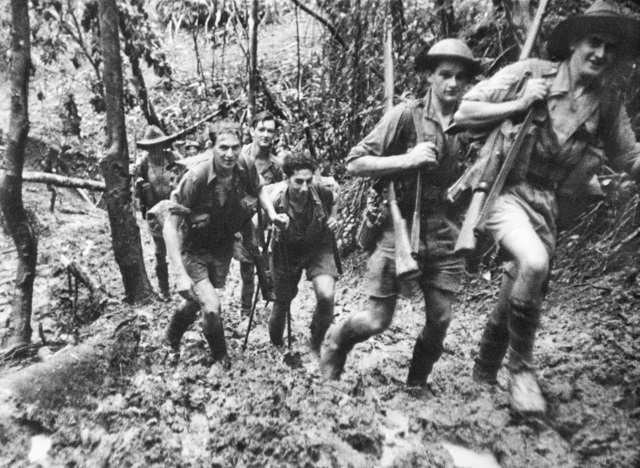
Australian forces fighting the Japanese along the Kokoda Trail in the jungles of New Guinea

Immediately after the fall of Malaya and Singapore in 1942, a few British officers, such as Freddie Spencer Chapman, eluded capture and escaped into the central Malaysian jungle, where they helped to organize and train bands of lightly armed local ethnic Chinese communists into a capable guerrilla force against the Japanese occupiers. What began as desperate initiatives by several determined British officers probably inspired the subsequent formation of the above-mentioned early jungle-warfare forces.

The British and the Australians contributed to the development of jungle warfare as the unconventional, low-intensity, guerrilla-style type of warfare understood today. V Force and Force 136 were composed of small bodies of soldiers and irregulars, equipped with no more than small arms and explosives but were rigorously trained in guerrilla warfare-style tactics, particularly in close-quarters combat, and fought behind enemy lines. They were joined in Burma by American led Kachin guerrillas were armed and coordinated by the American liaison organisation, OSS Detachment 101, which led, armed, and co-ordinated them.

Another small force operating in the Far East was the Australian-led Z Special Unit, which carried out a total of 81 covert operations in the South West Pacific theatre, some of which involved jungle warfare.

=== Cold War ===
==== British experience during Malayan Emergency ====
After the war, early skills in jungle warfare were further honed in the Malayan Emergency, when in 1948 guerrilla fighters of the Malayan Communist Party (MCP) turned against the Commonwealth. In addition to jungle discipline, field craft, and survival skills, special tactics such as combat tracking (first using native trackers), close-quarter fighting (tactics were developed by troopers who were protected only with fencing masks and stalked and shot each other in the jungle training ground with air rifles), small team operations (which led to the typical four-man special operations teams) and tree jumping (parachuting into the jungle and through the rain forest canopy) were developed from Borneo's native Iban people to actively take the war to the Communist guerrillas, instead of reacting to incidents that were initiated by them.

Of greater importance was the integration of the tactical jungle warfare with the strategic "winning hearts and minds" psychological, economic, and political warfare as a complete counter-insurgency package. The Malayan Emergency was declared over in 1960, as the surviving Communist guerrillas were driven to the jungle near the Thai border, where they remained until they gave up their armed struggle in 1989.

==== Portuguese Colonial War ====
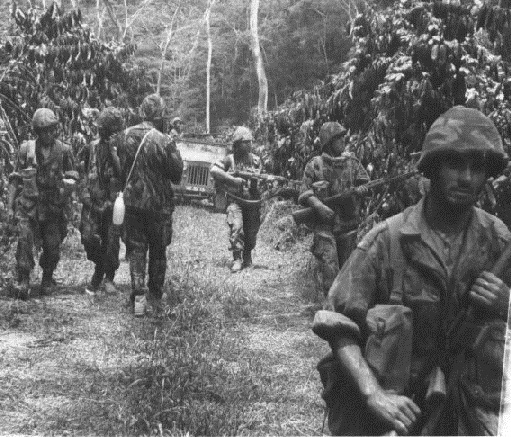
Portuguese Army special caçadores advancing in the African jungle during the Angola War of Independence

In the 1960s and early 1970s, Portugal was engaged in jungle warfare operations in Africa against the independentist guerrillas of Angola, Portuguese Guinea and Mozambique. The operations were part of what is collectively known as the "Portuguese Colonial War". In fact, there were three different wars: the Angolan Independence War, the Guinea-Bissau War of Independence and the Mozambican War of Independence. The situation was unique in that small armed forces, those of Portugal, conducted three large-scale counterinsurgency wars at the same time, each in a different theatre of operations and separated by thousands of kilometres from the others. For those operations, Portugal developed its own counterinsurgency and jungle warfare doctrines. In the counterinsurgency operations, the Portuguese organized their forces into two main types, the grid (quadrilha) units and the intervention units. The grid units were each in charge of a given area of responsibility in which they were responsible to protect and keep the local populations from influence from the guerrillas. The intervention forces, mostly composed of special units (paratroopers, marines, commandos etc.) were highly-mobile units that were used to conduct strategic offensive operations against the guerrillas or to temporary reinforcing grid units under heavy attack.

==== Vietnam War ====
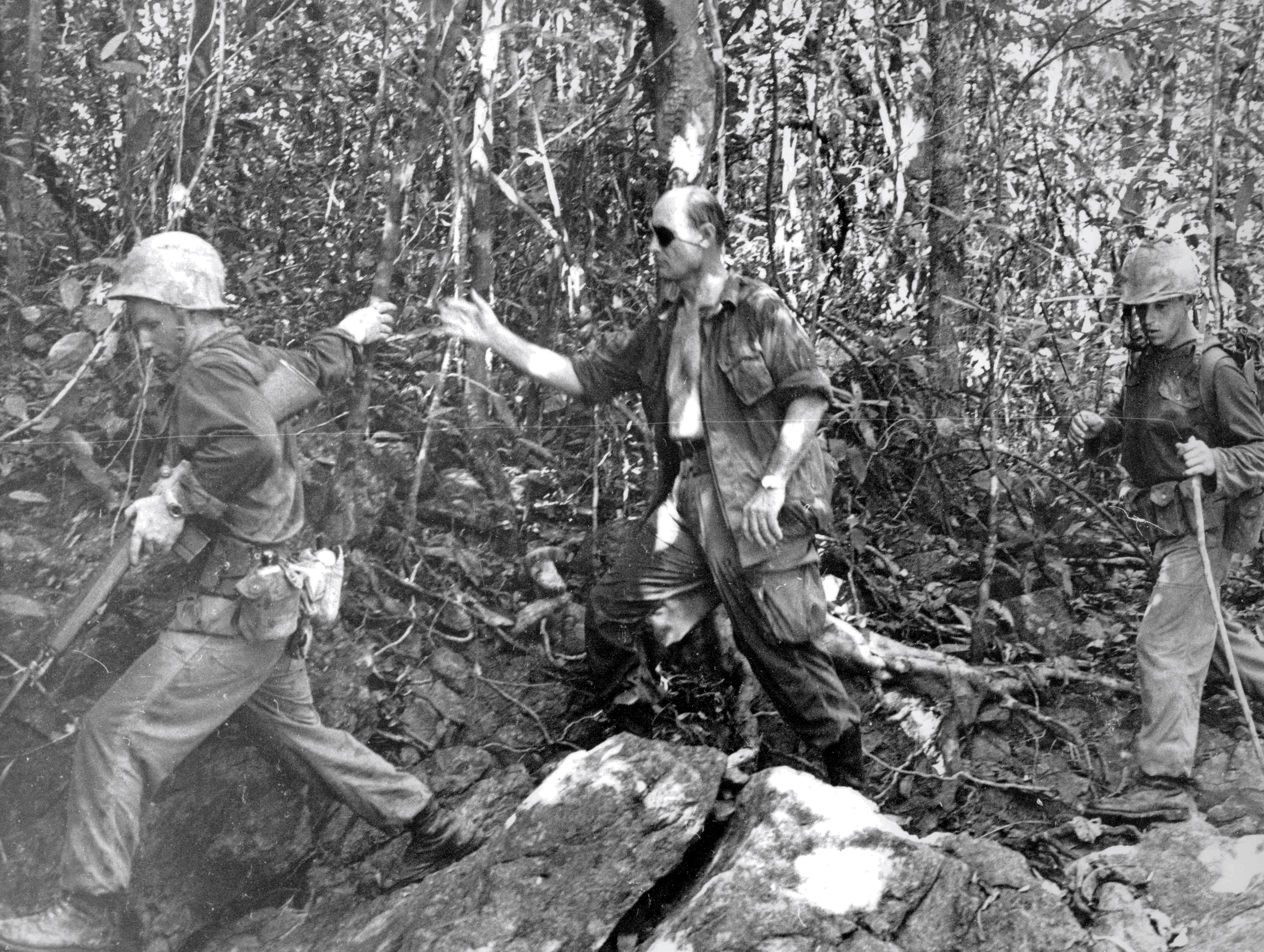
Moshe Dayan on patrol in the jungle as an observer with members of the US Marine Corps

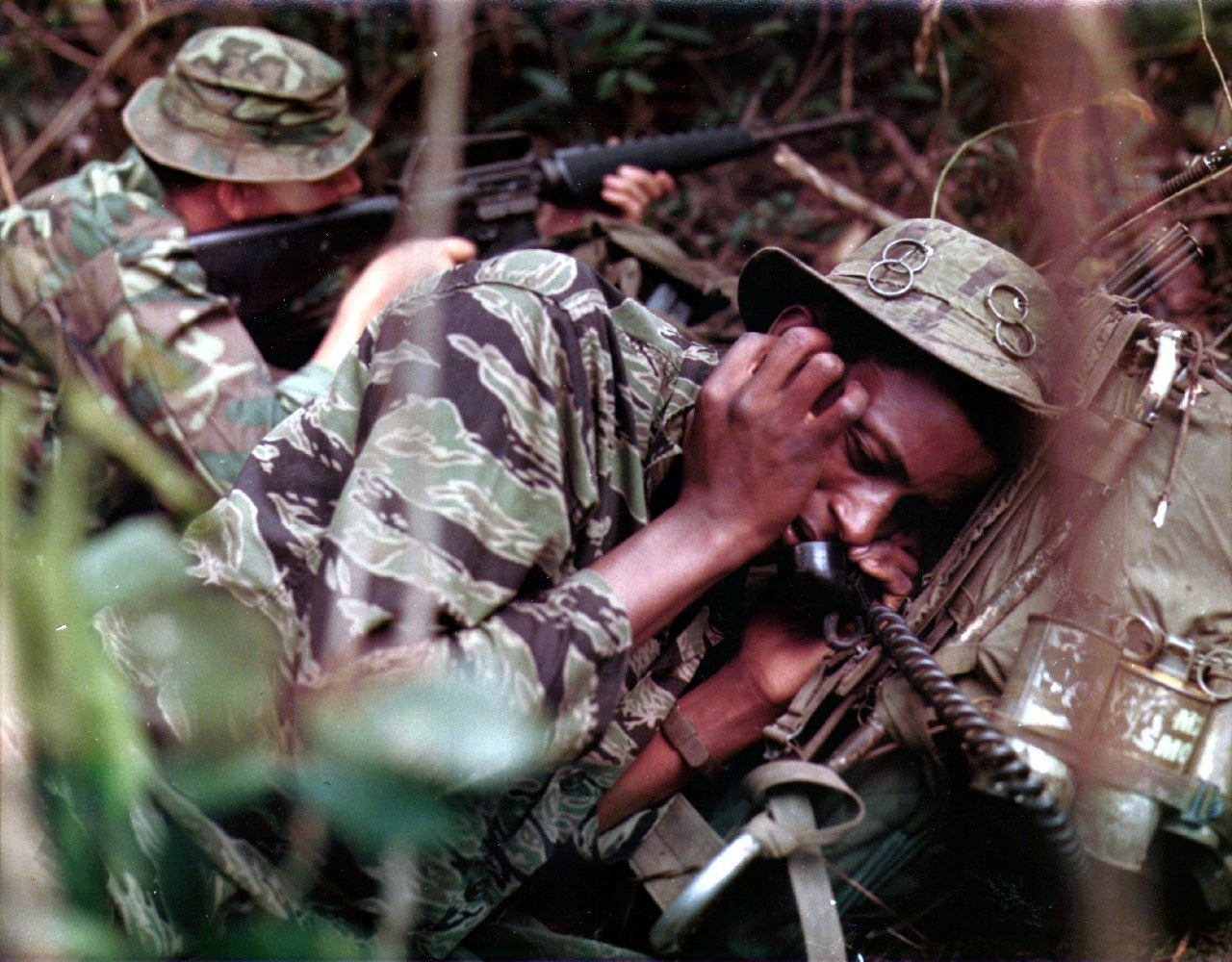
A pair of United States Army soldiers engaging targets in a jungle in 1969, during the Vietnam War

The British experience in counterinsurgency was passed onto the Americans during their involvement in the Vietnam War, where the battlegrounds were again the jungle. Much British strategic thinking on counterinsurgency tactics in a jungle environment was passed on through BRIAM (British Advisory Mission) to South Vietnam headed by Sir Robert Thompson, a former Chindit and the Permanent Secretary of Defense for Malaya during the Emergency.

The Americans further refined jungle warfare by the creation of such dedicated counterinsurgency special operations troops as the Special Forces (Green Berets), Rangers, Long Range Reconnaissance Patrols (LRRP), and Combat Tracker Teams (CTT).

During the 8 years of active U.S. combat involvement in the Vietnam War (1965–1973), jungle warfare became closely associated with counter insurgency and special operations troops.

However, although the American forces managed to have mastered jungle warfare at a tactical level in Vietnam, they were unable to install a successful strategic program in winning a jungle-based guerrilla war. Hence, the American military lost the political war in Vietnam for failing to destroy the logistics bases of the Viet Cong and the Vietnamese People's Army along the Ho Chi Minh Trail.

With the end of the Vietnam War, jungle warfare fell into disfavor among the major armies in the world, namely, those of the U.S.-led NATO and the Soviet-led Warsaw Pact, which focused their attention to conventional warfare with a nuclear flavor that was to be fought on the jungleless European battlefields.

American special operations troops that were created for the purpose of fighting in the jungle environment, such as LRRP and CTT, were disbanded, and other jungle-warfare-proficient troops, such as the Special Forces and Rangers, went through a temporary period of decline until they found their role in counterterrorism operations in the 1980s.

=== Post-Cold War ===
U.S. Marines training in the jungle

The end of the Soviet Union in the early 1990s marked the beginning of the end of a number of proxy wars that had been fought between the superpowers in the jungles of Africa, South America, and Southeast Asia. In the euphoria at the end of the Cold War, many Western nations were quick to claim the peace dividend and reinvested resources to other priorities.

Jungle warfare was reduced in scope and priority in the regular training curriculum of most conventional Western armies. The nature of major military operations in the Middle East and Central Asia saw the need to put an emphasis upon desert warfare and urban warfare training in both the conventional and the unconventional warfare models.

== Jungle units and training schools ==
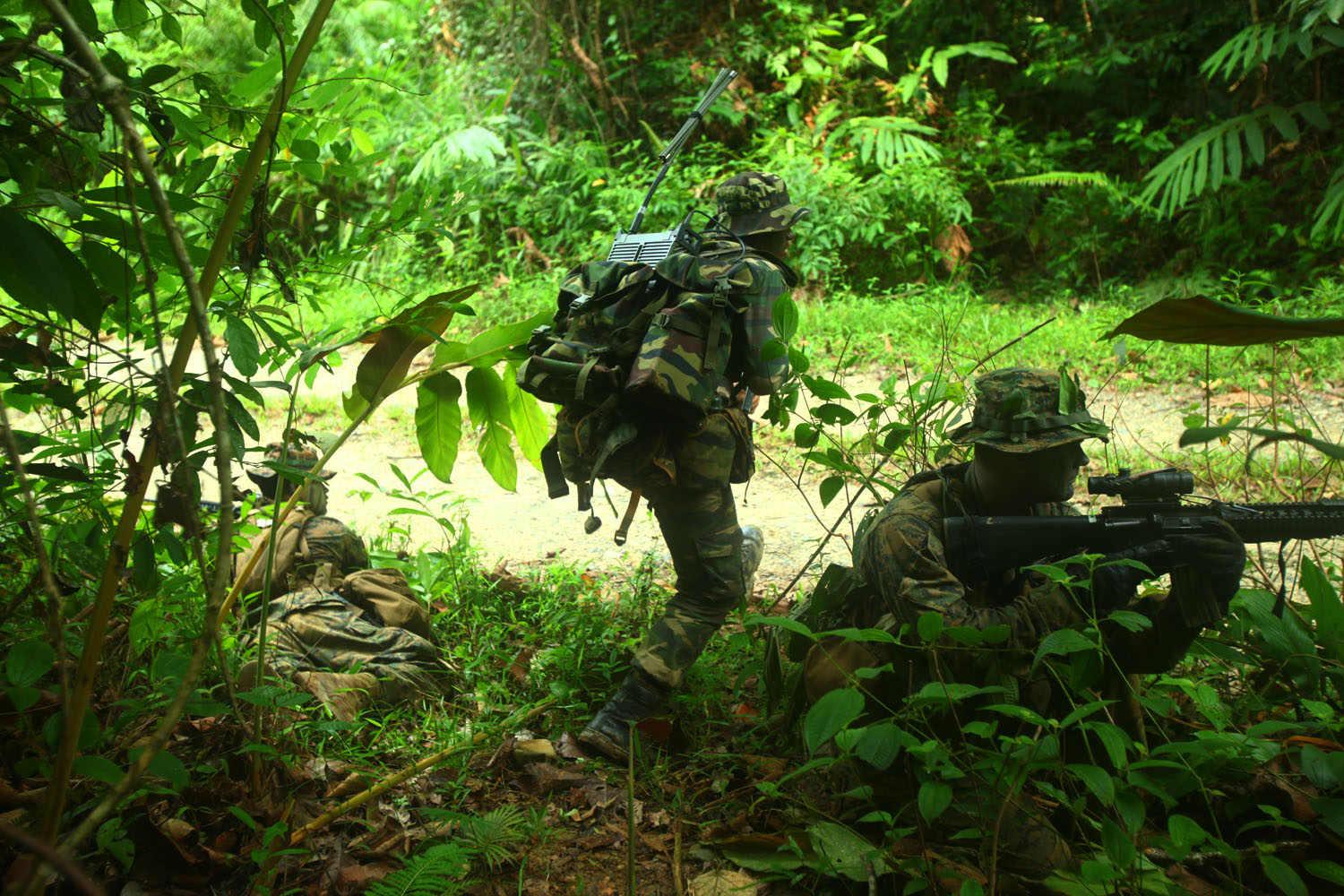
U.S. Marines and Malaysian soldiers conducted jungle operations training as part of CARAT 2011.

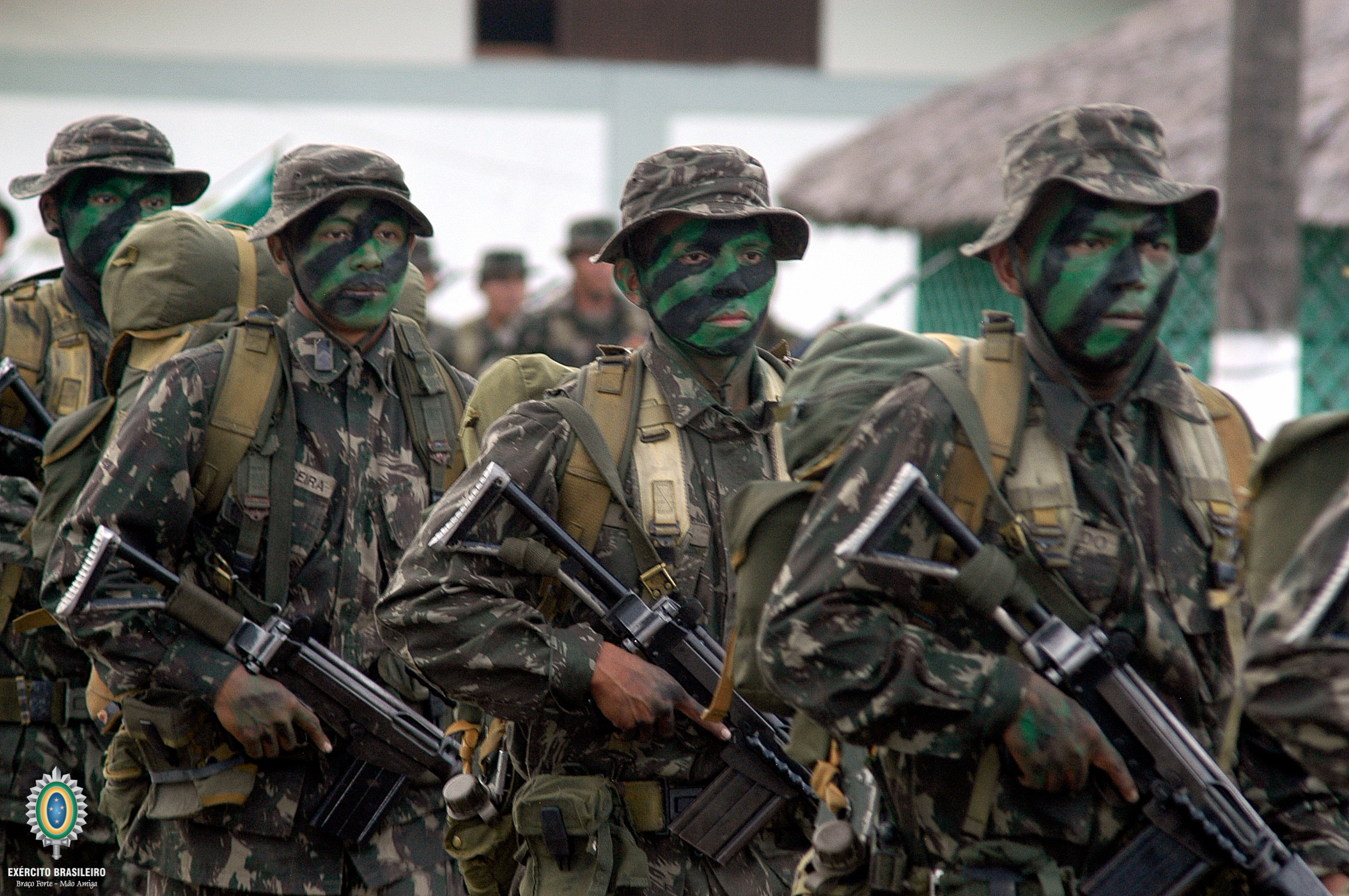
Brazilian Army Jungle Infantry.

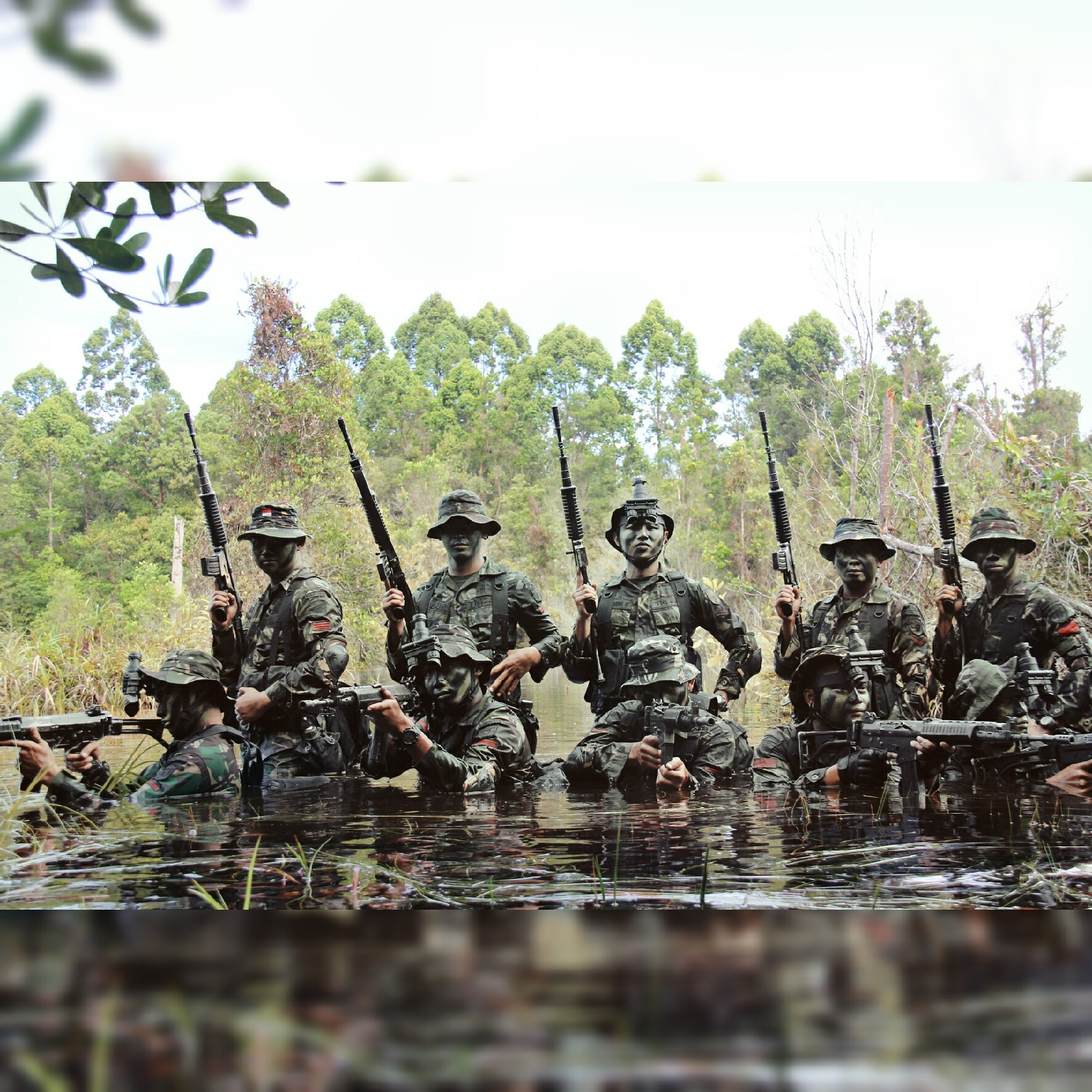
Indonesian Army Infantry soldiers during Jungle warfare exercise

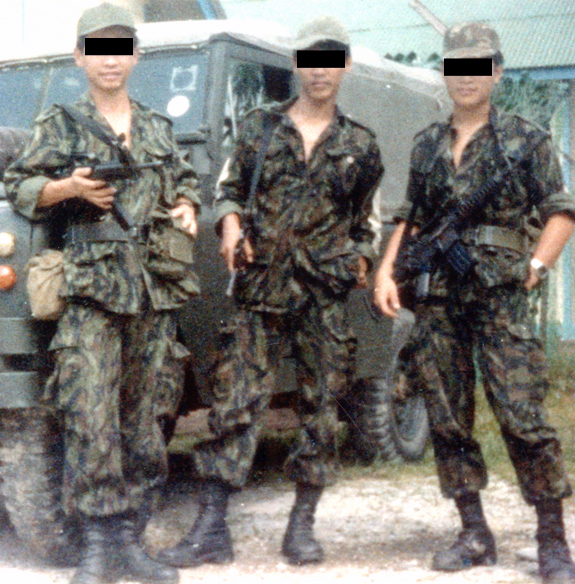
Singapore Army Combat Trackers, a little known elite four-team jungle warfare unit, in Brunei during the early 1980s

The following military and police forces have specialized units that are trained and equipped to conduct jungle warfare:

- Argentina: the Argentine Army has four companies of Cazadores de Monte (Jungle Hunters).
- Brazil: the Brazilian Army has six Jungle Infantry Brigades: 1st, 2nd, 16th, 17th, 22nd and 23rd Jungle Infantry Brigades and others units, and the Jungle Warfare Training Center (CIGS). Brazilian Special Forces, Commandos, Parachute Infantry and Marine Corps are trained in jungle warfare too. The SOF of some State Military Police Forces, like the Military Police of São Paulo's Comandos e Operações Especiais, the Military Police of Minas Gerais's Batalhão de Operações Especiais (BOPE)/COMAF, the Military Police of Rio de Janeiro's Batalhão de Operações Policiais Especiais (which has an agreement with the CIGS) and the Military Police of Maranhão's Companhia de Operações de Sobrevivência em Área Rural (COSAR) has training or are specialized in jungle operations. Jungle artillery is made by the 1st and the 10th Jungle Field Artillery Group.
- Brunei:
  - Royal Brunei Armed Forces (RBAF)
    - Royal Brunei Land Force (RBLF)
      - Gurkha Reserve Unit (GRU)
      - Royal Brunei Land Force Regiment (RBLFR)
    - Royal Brunei Navy (RBN)
      - Naval Surface Action Group (NSAG)
    - Royal Brunei Air Force (RBAF)
      - No. 236 Squadron
      - Parachute Airborne Tactical Delivery Unit (PATDU)
  - Royal Brunei Police Force (RBPF)
    - Special Operations Squad (PGK)
- Cambodia:
  - Royal Cambodian Armed Forces (RCAF)
    - Royal Cambodian Army
      - 911th Special Forces Regiment
      - B-70
      - All infantry divisions and mechanized infantry brigade can fight in the jungle.
    - Royal Cambodian Navy
      - Naval Infantry Company
    - Royal Gendarmerie
      - Infantry Battalion
- Colombia: Brigada de Fuerzas Especiales, Batallones de Selva.
- Ecuador: the Ecuadorian Army maintains three units composed of jungle troops: the 17th, 19th and 21st Jungle Infantry Brigades (Brigadas de Infantería de Selva). In addition, it has an independent jungle battalion with personnel recruited from the native population of the jungle: the 23rd Special Operations Training Battalion (Batallón Escuela de Operaciones Especiales 23, or BEOES 23). It has also a training school for jungle operations, the Escuela de Selva "Cap. Giovanny Calles".
- Indonesia:
  - Indonesian Army
    - Combat Reconnaissance Platoon (Tontaipur) are Kostrad's special unit which expertise in Reconnaissance operations, it is trained in jungle warfare in accordance with the terrain of the tropical country.
- India:
  - The Indian Army maintains an elite Counter Insurgency and Jungle Warfare School which is used to train domestic and foreign units in methods for countering irregular warfare.
- Malaysia
  - Ministry of Natural Resources and Environmental Sustainability (MPRT)
    - Forestry Department of Peninsular Malaysia
      - Forest Ranger
  - Malaysian Armed Forces (MAF)
    - Malaysian Army
      - 10th Parachute Brigade (10 PARA BDE)
      - 21st Special Service Group (GGK)
      - Border Regiment
      - Royal Armoured Corps (KAD)
      - Royal Malay Regiment
      - Royal Ranger Regiment (RRD)
      - Territorial Army Regiment
    - Royal Malaysian Navy (RMN)
      - PASKAL
    - Royal Malaysian Air Force (RMAF)
      - Royal Malaysian Air Force Regiment (RMAFR)
        - HANDAU
        - Infantry Security Group
        - PASKAU
  - Malaysian Maritime Enforcement Agency (MMEA)
    - Special Task and Rescue (STAR)
  - Royal Malaysia Police (RMP)
    - General Operations Force
    - Special Operations Command (PGK)
      - Special Actions Unit (UTK)
      - VAT 69 Commando (VAT 69)
    - UNGERIN
- Myanmar:
  - Tatmadaw
    - Myanmar Army
      - Airborne Infantry Division (AID)
      - Armoured Infantry Battalions (AIB)
      - Border Guard Forces (BGF)
      - Light Infantry Divisions (LID)
      - Special Forces Brigade (SFB)
    - Myanmar Navy
      - Myanmar Navy SEALs
      - Naval Infantry Battalion (NIB)
  - Myanmar Police Force
    - Border Guard Police (BGP)
    - Combat Police Battalions (SWAT)
    - Forestry Security Police Force
- Philippines
  - Armed Forces of the Philippines (AFP)
    - Philippine Army (PA)
      - All infantry divisions, armor division and combined arms brigade can fight in the jungle.
      - Light Reaction Regiment (LRR)
      - Scout Ranger
      - Special Forces Regiment (Airborne)
    - Philippine Navy (PN)
      - Naval Special Operations Command (NAVSOCOM)
      - Philippine Marine Corps (PMC)
        - Force Reconnaissance Group (FRG)
        - Marine Brigades
        - Marine Rifle Battalions (MRB)
        - Marine Security and Escort Group (MSEG)
        - Marine Scout Snipers (MSS)
    - Philippine Air Force (PAF)
      - 710th Special Operations Wing (710th SPOW)
  - Department of Environment and Natural Resources (DENR)
    - Park Ranger
  - Philippine National Police (PNP)
    - Regional Mobile Force Battalion (RMFB)
    - Special Action Force (SAF)
- Thailand
  - Ministry of Interior (MOI)
    - Department of Provincial Administration (DOPA)
      - Volunteer Defense Corps (VDC)
  - Ministry of Natural Resources and Environment (MNRE)
    - Royal Forest Department (RFD)
      - Forest Ranger
      - Park Ranger
      - Small Ranger Unit (SRU)
  - Royal Thai Armed Forces (RTARF)
    - Royal Thai Army (RTA)
      - 31st Infantry Regiment, King Bhumibol's Guard
      - All infantry, cavalry, and mechanized infantry divisions can fight in the jungle.
      - Long Range Reconnaissance Patrols Company (LRRP)
      - Royal Thai Army Special Warfare Command (RTASWC)
      - Thahan Phran
    - Royal Thai Navy (RTN)
      - Mekong Riverine Unit (MRU)
      - Royal Thai Marine Corps (RTMC)
        - Marine Division
          - 1st Marine Regiment
          - 2nd Marine Regiment
          - 3rd Marine Regiment
          - Marine Task Forces (MTF)
            - Marine 61st Special Operations Center
            - Marines Task Unit 411
            - Paramilitary Marine Regiment
          - RECON
      - Royal Thai Navy SEALs
    - Royal Thai Air Force (RTAF)
      - RTAF Security Force Command
        - Special Operations Regiment (SOR)
  - Royal Thai Police (RTP)
    - Border Patrol Police (BPP)
      - Aerial Reinforcement Division (ARD) aka Police Aerial Reinforcement Unit (PARU)
        - Naresuan 261
        - Special Forces Company (SFC)
      - All Border Patrol Police Regional Divisions can fight in the jungle.
        - Special unit Border Patrol Police Regional Divisions
          - 4th Border Patrol Police Regional Divisions
            - 43th Border Patrol Police Sub-Division
              - SINGA Special Operations Team
            - 44th Border Patrol Police Sub-Division
              - Long Range Surveillance Unit (LRSU)
- United States: The U.S. Army 25th Infantry Division is the primary jungle warfare unit in its size. The 25th Infantry Division conducts military operations primarily in the Asia-Pacific region; it also operates the Jungle Operations Training Course, Jungle Environment Working Group, and the Lightning Academy Jungle School.

== Jungle warfare training ==
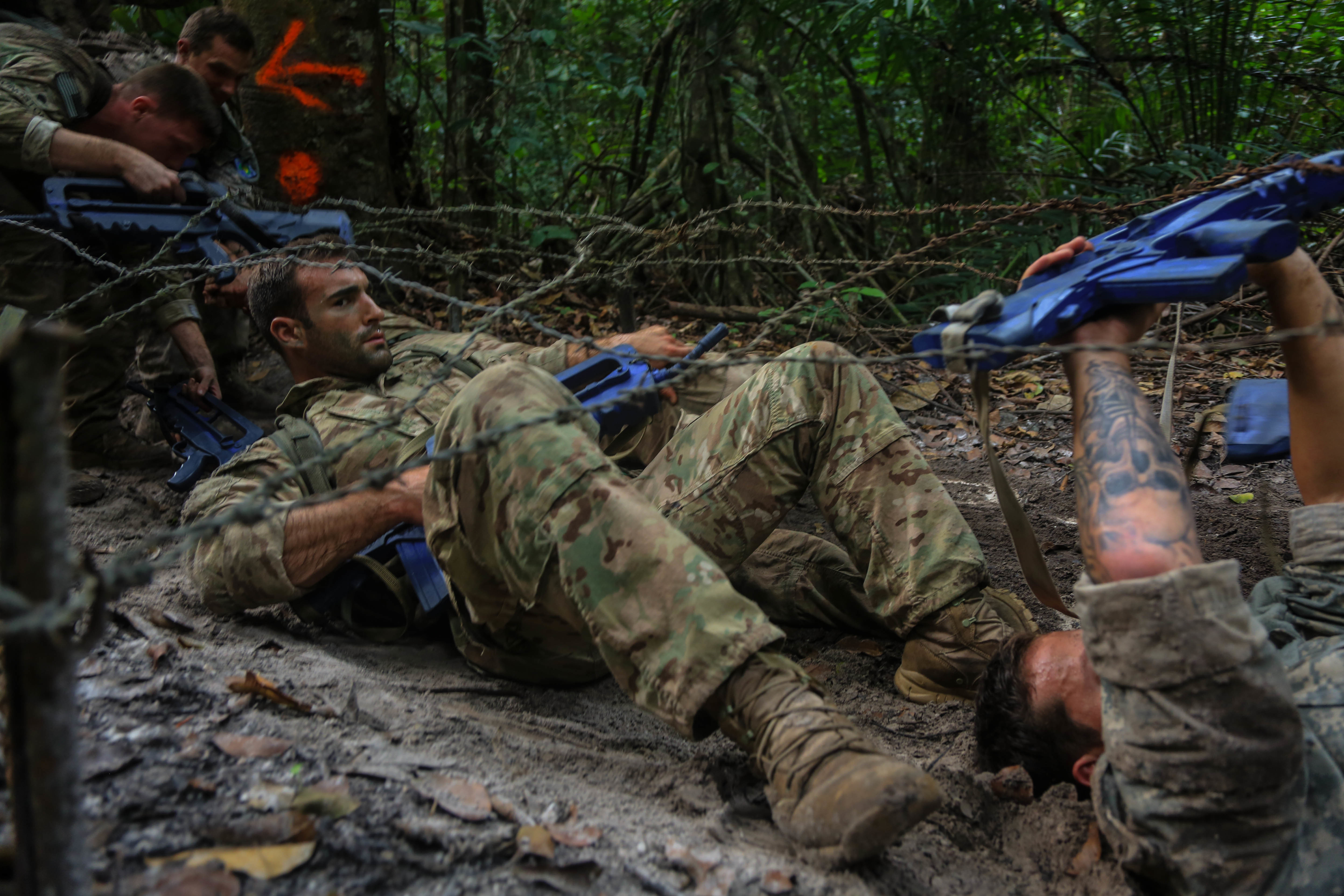
French Army personnel training at the Jungle Warfare School in French Guiana

=== Brazil ===
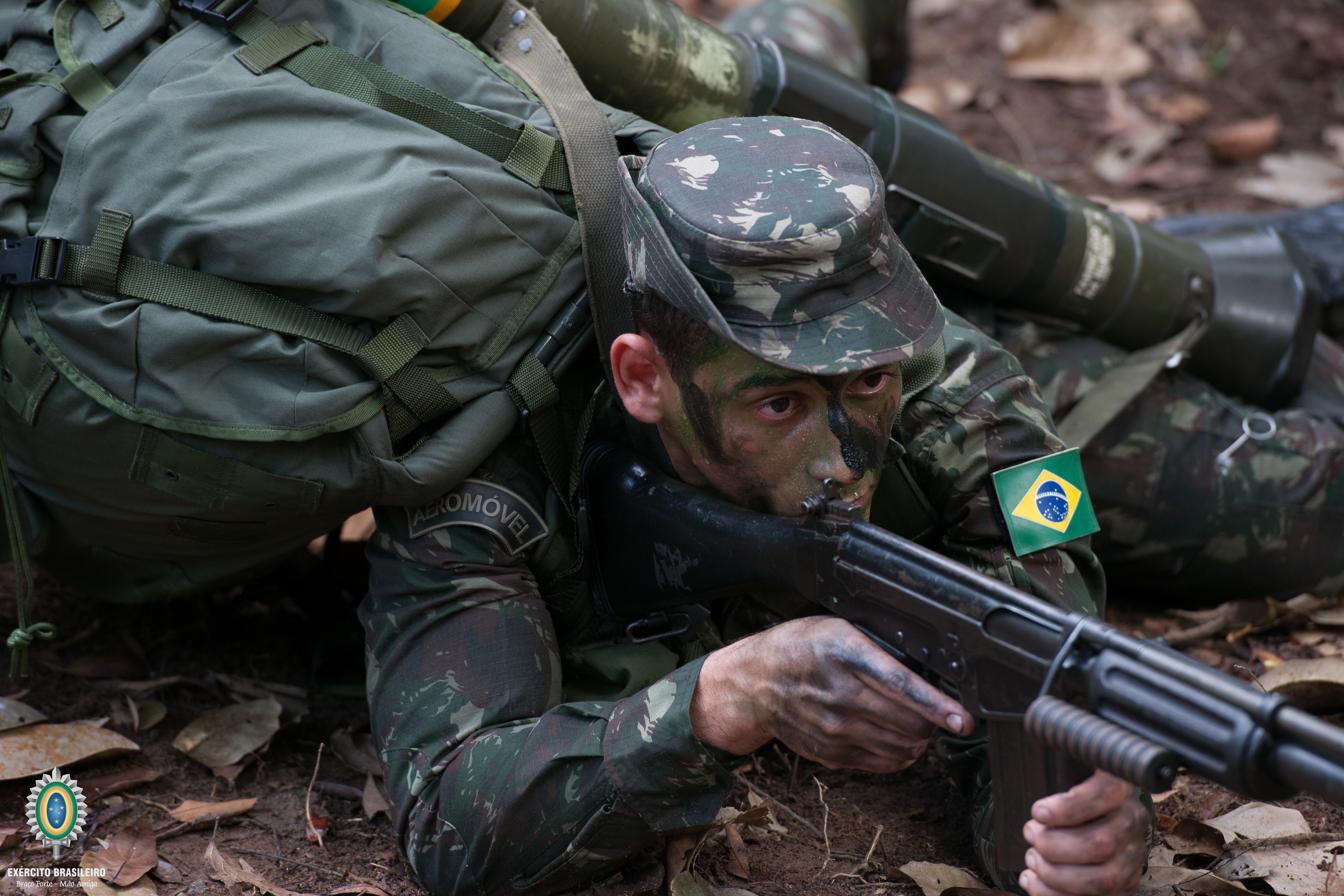
A Brazilian Army soldier training at the Jungle Warfare Training Center

The Jungle Warfare Training Center (or Centro de Instrução de Guerra Na Selva (CIGS)) in Manaus, Brazil is the primary jungle warfare training center for Brazilian forces. They seek to copy the capacities of units of homologous commands.

=== France ===
The Equatorial Forest Training Center (or Centre d'entraînement en forêt équatoriale (CEFE)) located near Régina in French Guiana is the primary jungle warfare training center for French forces.

=== India ===
The Counter-Insurgency and Jungle Warfare School (CIJWS) located in Vairengte, Mizoram, India, is the primary jungle warfare training center for Indian forces.

=== United States ===
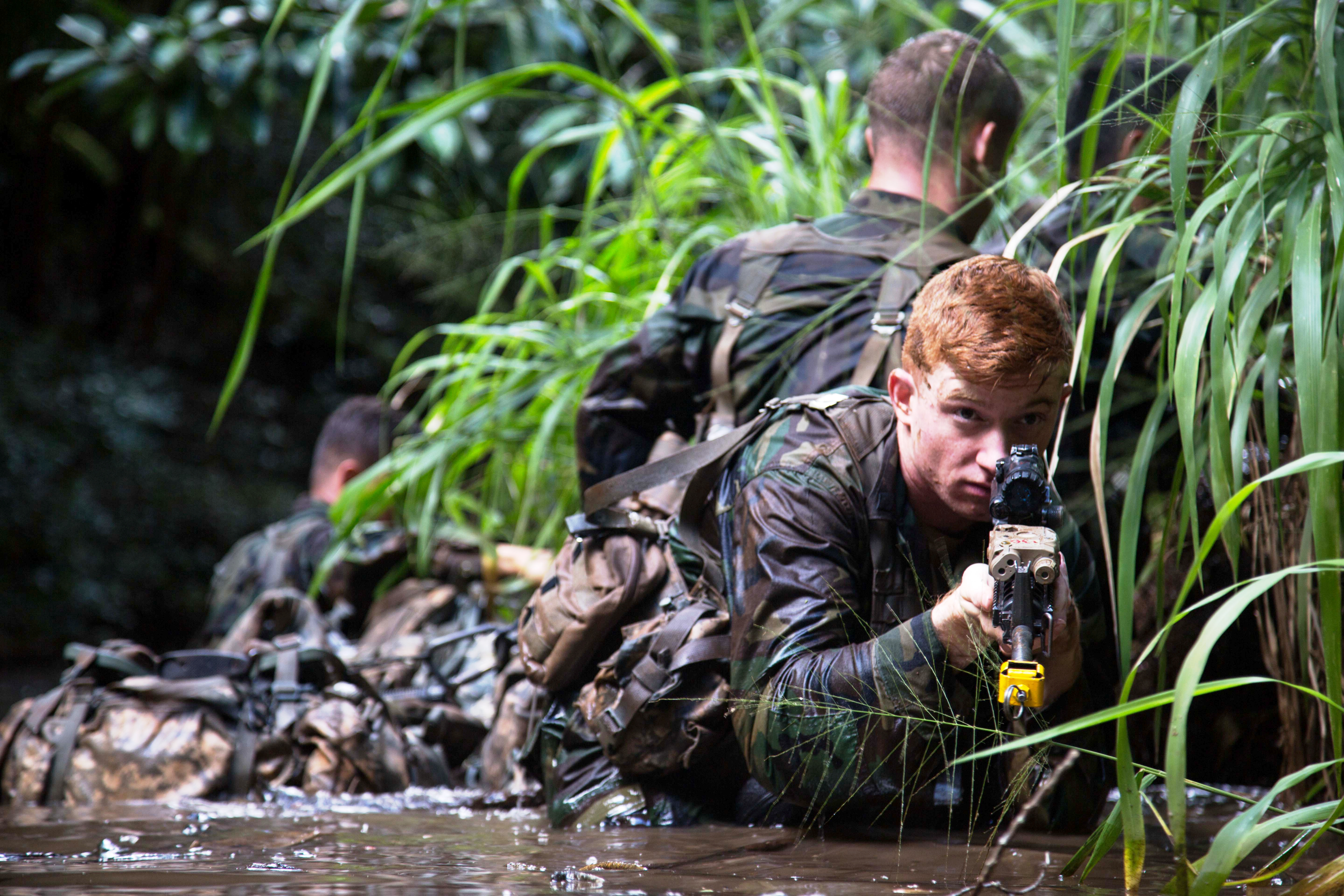
U.S. Army soldiers training at the Jungle Operations Training Center in 2015

The Jungle Operations Training Center (JOTC) located at Schofield Barracks in Oahu, Hawaii is a jungle warfare training center for American forces. Opened in its present rendition in 2013, JOTC is operated by the 25th Infantry Division and primarily trains personnel of the 25th Infantry Division, special forces, and foreign partners. Hawaii was chosen as the location for JOTC due to its climate, geography, capacity, and operational history in jungle training within the Pacific.

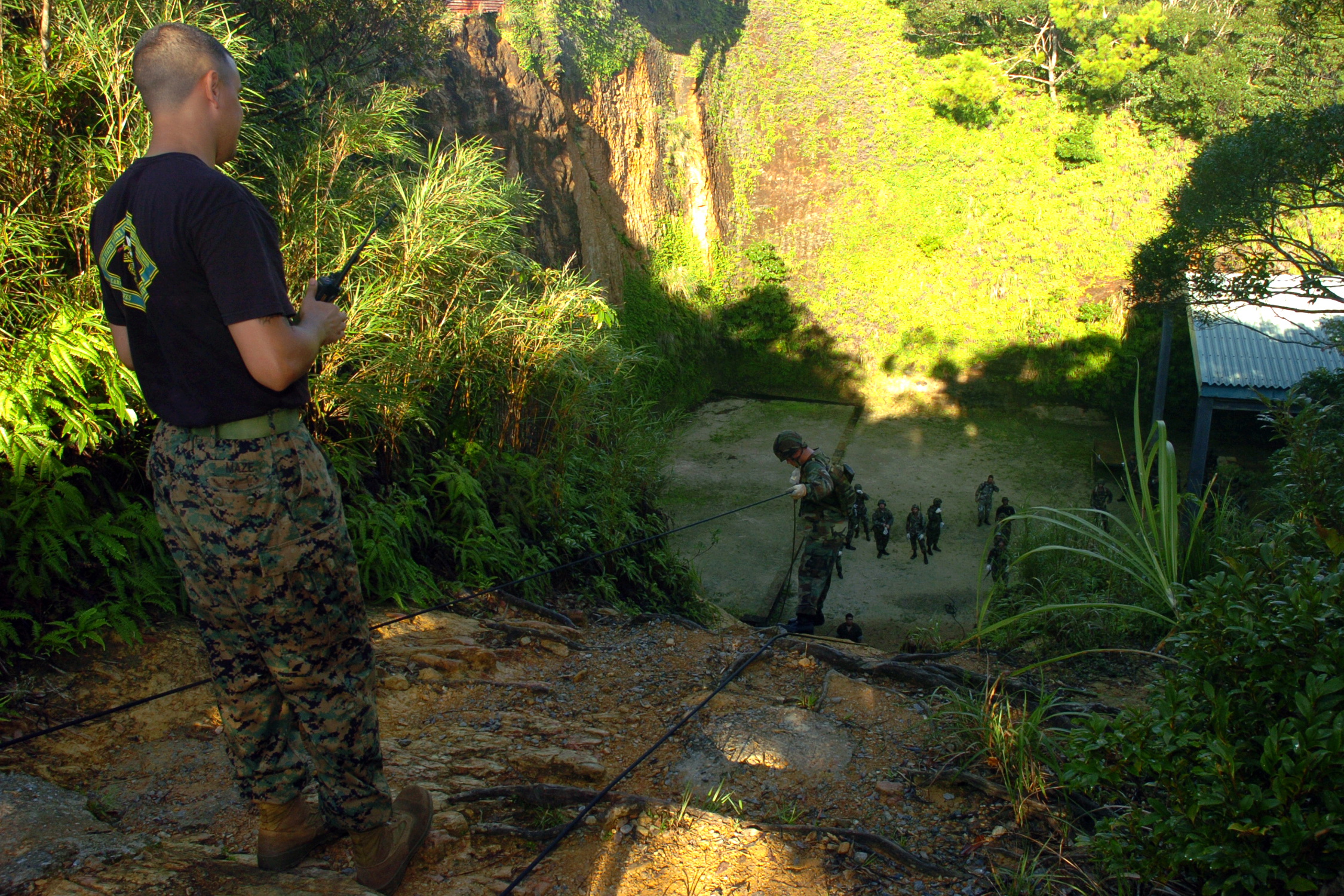
U.S. Navy Seabees training at Camp Gonsalves in 2007

Jungle warfare training is not new to this organization in Hawaii or the United States. During World War II the JOTC, also known as the Pacific Combat Training Center, was established in Hawaii to teach soldiers survival and fighting skills in tropical environments. Over 300,000 U.S. military personnel were trained in jungle fighting prior to deploying throughout the Pacific. Between 1956 and 1965, this same installation in Hawaii was home to the Jungle and Guerilla Warfare Training Center followed by the Recondo School from 1971 to 1979. The U.S. Asia-Pacific Rebalance Strategy necessitated jungle warfare training for the U.S. military be increased in priority. JOTC's revival at its original location in Hawaii is in part due to closure of the Fort Sherman, Panama JOTC location in 1999.

On January 27, 2026 the Army Security Cooperation Group–South (ASCG-S) took command of the Combined Jungle Operations Training Center (CJOTC) in Panama. The Army renewed and updated the CJOTC jungle warfare course at Aeronaval Base Cristobal Colon with their partners in Panama. Currently the course is 18 days long with a focus on fire and shelter building, tracking and patrol based exercises. The first group of soldiers began the course in February 2026. Soldiers who complete the course will receive the Jungle Warfare Tab. The course is not limited to U.S. Army soldiers, in May 2026 the first U.S. Air Force airman and in September 2026 the first U.S. Space Force guardians graduated from the school. The course has three phases and is taught by Panamanian instructors.

Phase 1, day 1 begins with in-processing, following which students are immediately given a Combat Water Survival Assessment (CWSA) testing their ability to swim and operate with equipment while in uniform, followed on day 2 by a 5K terrain run with rifle and front load carrier. These first two events are critical requirement evaluations, and students that fail either will continue the course of training but not be eligible to earn the J2 ASI (Additional Skill Identifier). Students then proceed to medical training and rope/knot training, followed by jungle survival skills.

Phase 2 then transitions to tactical operations in the jungle, including further rope work for moving loads and casualties, or crossing water obstacles, followed by day land navigation and waterborne operations, both of which include critical requirement events. Phase 2 continues with jungle movement techniques, battle drills, and tracking/anti-tracking classes.

In Phase 3, students undergo a multi-mission field training exercise (FTX), in which they are inserted via helicopter and left to conduct sustained operations over multiple days. FTX operations include a squad attack and a capstone critical event known as "The Green Mile", which is a squad-level team event involving both obstacle clearance, land navigation, and skills testing. Students who successfully complete all critical events and meet all other course requirements earn the J2 ASI and the Jungle Tab (the same as issued in Hawaii), continuing the legacy of the former "Jungle Expert" patch.

Another jungle warfare training center, Camp Gonsalves, is operated by the United States Marine Corps on northern Okinawa Island, Japan.
