= JOTC =

- Jungle Operations Training Center
- Junior Officer Training Course
- Joke Of The Century
