= Pindad G2 =

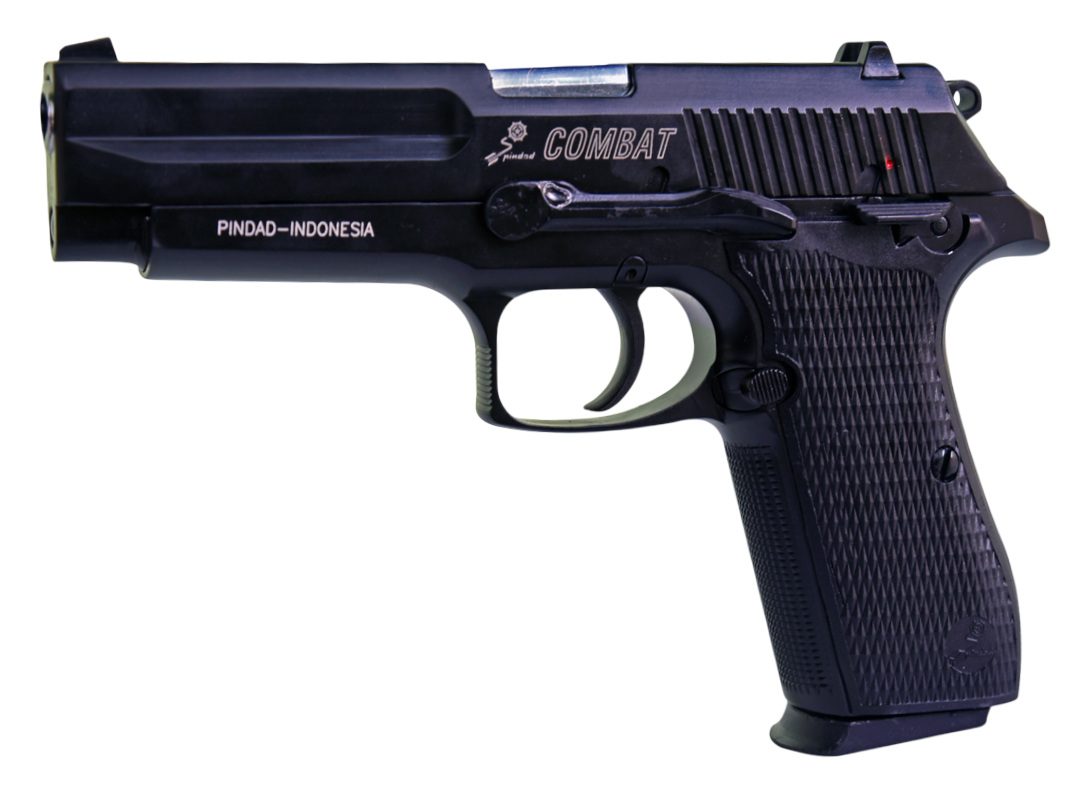
- A Pindad G2 Combat pistol
- Type: Handgun
- Place of origin: Indonesia

Service history
- In service: 2011–present
- Used by: See Users

Production history
- Designer: Pindad
- Manufacturer: Pindad
- Variants: See Variants

Specifications
- Mass: 0.95 kg unloaded
- Length: 200 mm (G2 Combat); 221 mm (G2 Elite); 222 mm (G2 Premium)
- Barrel length: 114 mm (G2 Combat); 127 mm (G2 Elite & Premium)
- Cartridge: 9×19mm Parabellum
- Caliber: 9 mm
- Action: Recoil operated semi-automatic
- Effective firing range: 50 m
- Feed system: 15-round magazine
- Sights: Iron

The Pindad G2 is a 9×19mm Parabellum handgun designed and produced by Pindad. It is a recoil-operated semi-automatic handgun utilizing a John Browning-style tilting barrel mechanism. This mechanism harnesses the recoil of the fired round to push the slide rearwards.

== History ==
The G2 Combat was manufactured to replace the Pindad P1 and P2 (licensed copy of Browning Hi-Power P-35) as the standard sidearm of the Indonesian National Armed Forces. Design and production G2 has been carried out since the middle of the year 2010, while mass production started in 2011. In 2012, it's reported that Indonesian Army purchased an unknown number of G2s.

The G2 Premium was unveiled in 2016.

In April 2017, Pindad reported that some African and Middle Eastern countries expressed interest to acquire the G2. On June 1, 2018, Pindad announced that it had entered into a partnership with Bhukhanvala Industries to market the SS2 to Indian military and law enforcement agencies.

On 10 February 2022, Pindad awarded a decorated G2 Elite to Florence Parly in her capacity as the Minister of the Armed Forces.

On 7 November 2022, the Deputy Commander of the Royal Cambodian Army expressed interest in Pindad rifles and handguns. On 6 June 2024, Jakarta approved military assistance to Cambodia in the form of 150 Pindad SS2-V5-A1 rifles and 20 Pindad G2 Elite pistols, with ammunition. The military assistance received by the Vice Commander of RCAF and Commander of the Royal Cambodian Army on 29 August 2024.

== Variants ==
=== G2 Combat ===
The G2 Combat is a 114 mm (4.5 inch) barrel length pistol with a 15 round capacity, weight 0.90 kg, high 136 mm, fixed front-sight and rear-sight.

==== G2 Combat A1 ====
A sub-variant of the G2 Combat. An optical sight can be attached to the slide via a mount that replaces the rear sight and a flashlight or a laser-sight can be attached via a frame-mounted Picatinny rail.

=== G2 Elite ===
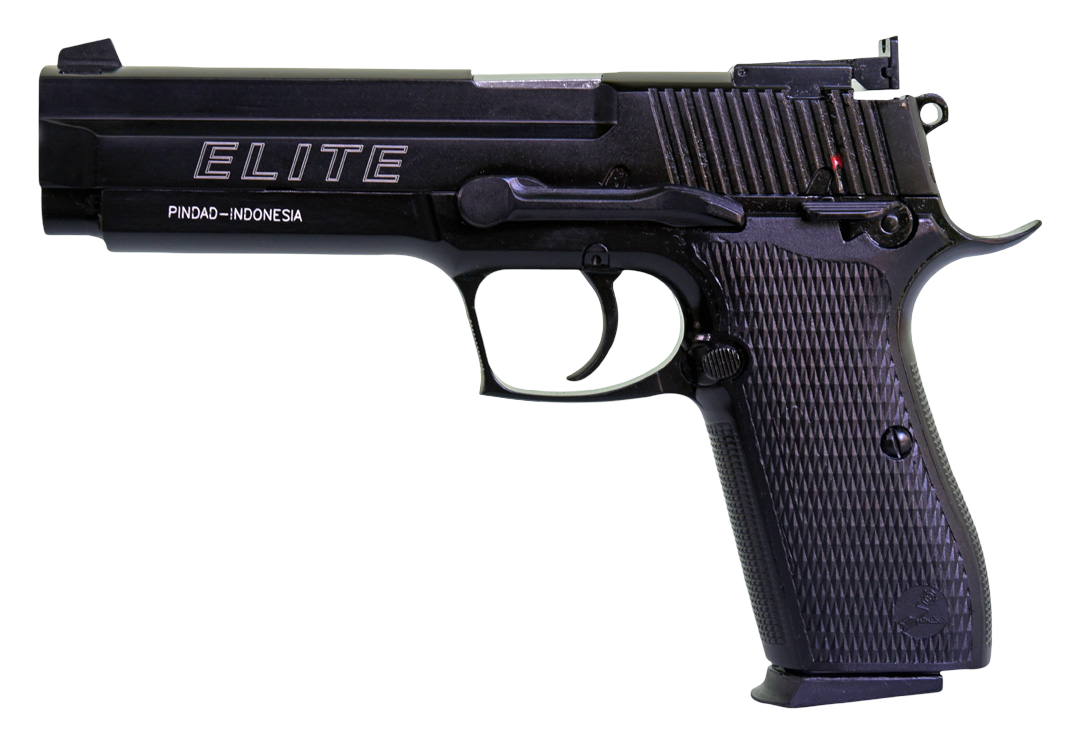
A Pindad G2 Elite pistol.

The G2 Elite is a 127 mm (5 inch) barrel length pistol, with a 15 round capacity, weight 1+0.05 kg, high 139 mm, fixed front-sight. Intended to be more accurate than the G2 Combat, the G2 Elite is equipped with an adjustable rear-sight (compared to the G2 Combat's fixed rear-sight) in order to assist the user when engaging a target at long ranges. It also comes with a slightly different design compared to the G2 Combat, notably the rear part of the slide.

=== G2 Premium ===
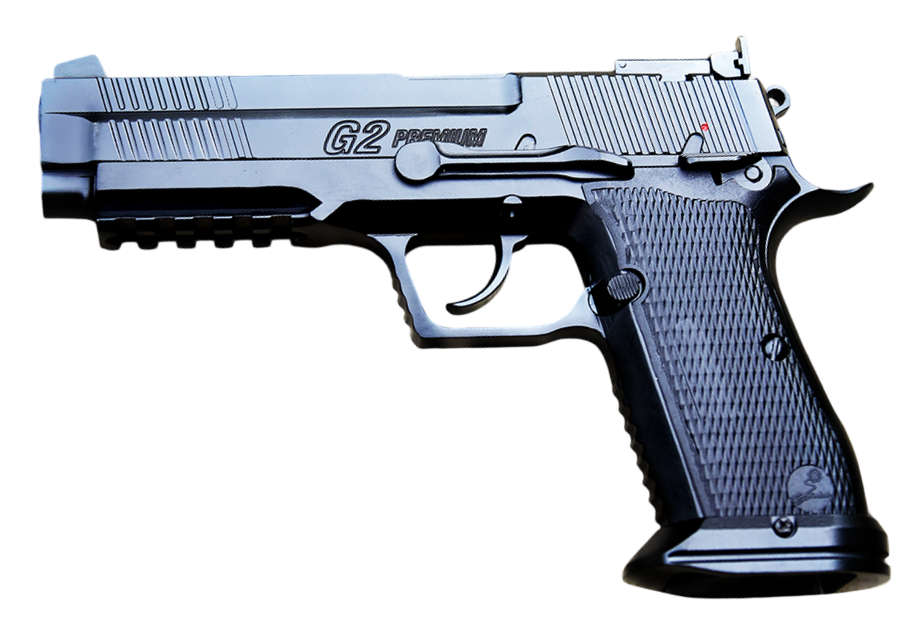
A Pindad G2 Premium pistol.

The G2 Premium is a 127 mm (5 inch) barrel length pistol with a 15 round capacity, semi-automatic. This variant is the latest upgrade within the G2 family, manufactured by taking input from the users who have previously fired the G2 Combat and the G2 Elite into account. The pistol was publicly unveiled in 2016.

It's the only pistol in the G2 series (before the G2 Combat A1) to have a frame-mounted Picatinny rail.

== Derivatives ==
=== MAG-4 ===
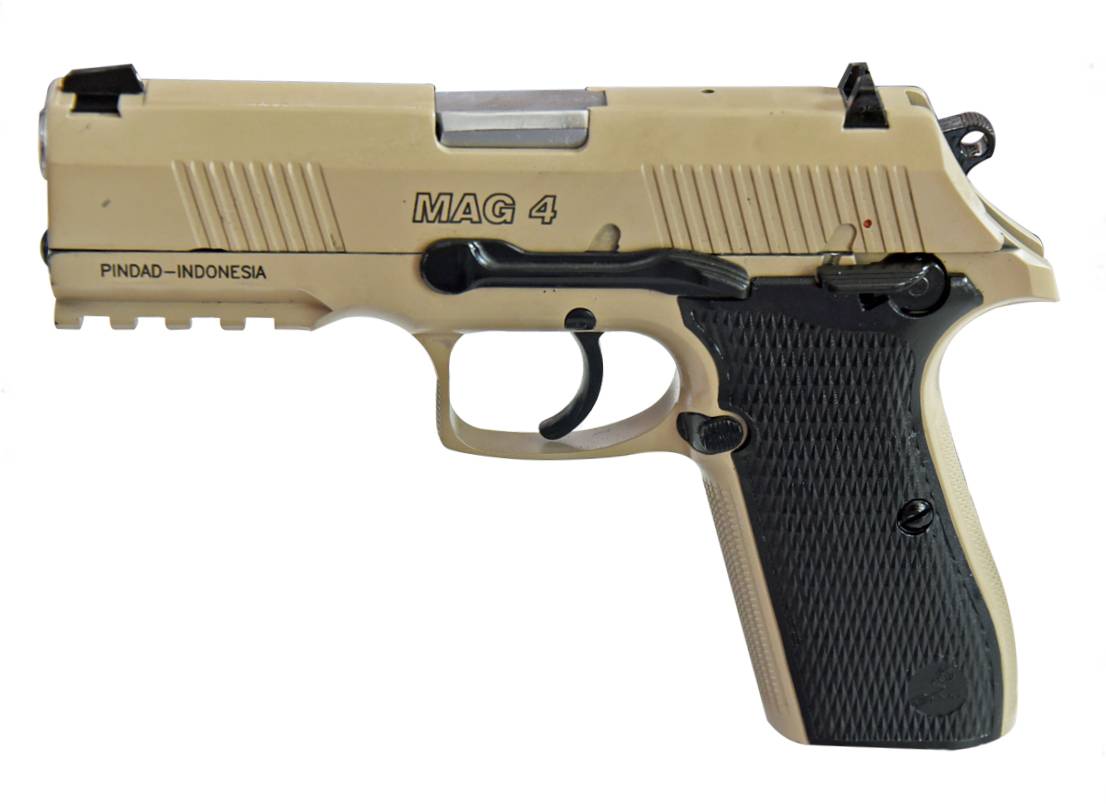
A Pindad MAG-4

The MAG-4 is a 9×19mm caliber pistol, with 4 inches-barrel length, overall length 190 mm, height 136 mm, and weighs 910 grams (without magazine); it was first introduced in September 2017.

The basic design of the MAG-4 is derived from the G2 Combat pistol. The difference between the MAG-4 and the G2 Combat pistol lies in the barrel length, where the MAG-4 has a shorter barrel. The frame features an underbarrel Picatinny rail that can be used to mount either a laser sight or a flashlight, and the weapon also features adjustable front and rear sights. It was designed for the patrol unit (Indonesian: Sabhara) of the Indonesian National Police, with its small size aimed at making it easier for police to use and carry.

== Users ==
Country	Organization	Model	Note & Ref.
Brunei	Royal Brunei Armed Forces	G2 Elite	
Cambodia	Special Forces Command of the Royal Cambodian Army	G2 Elite	
Indonesia	Indonesian National Armed Forces	G2 Combat, G2 Elite	
Indonesia	Indonesian National Police	G2 Combat, G2 Elite, MAG-4	
Indonesia	Indonesian State Intelligence Agency	G2 Premium	
Laos	Lao People's Army	G2 Combat	
Malaysia	Malaysian Army	G2 Elite	
Philippines	Philippine National Police	G2 Combat	Delivered in 2015.
Vietnam	People's Army of Vietnam	G2 Combat	

== Gallery ==
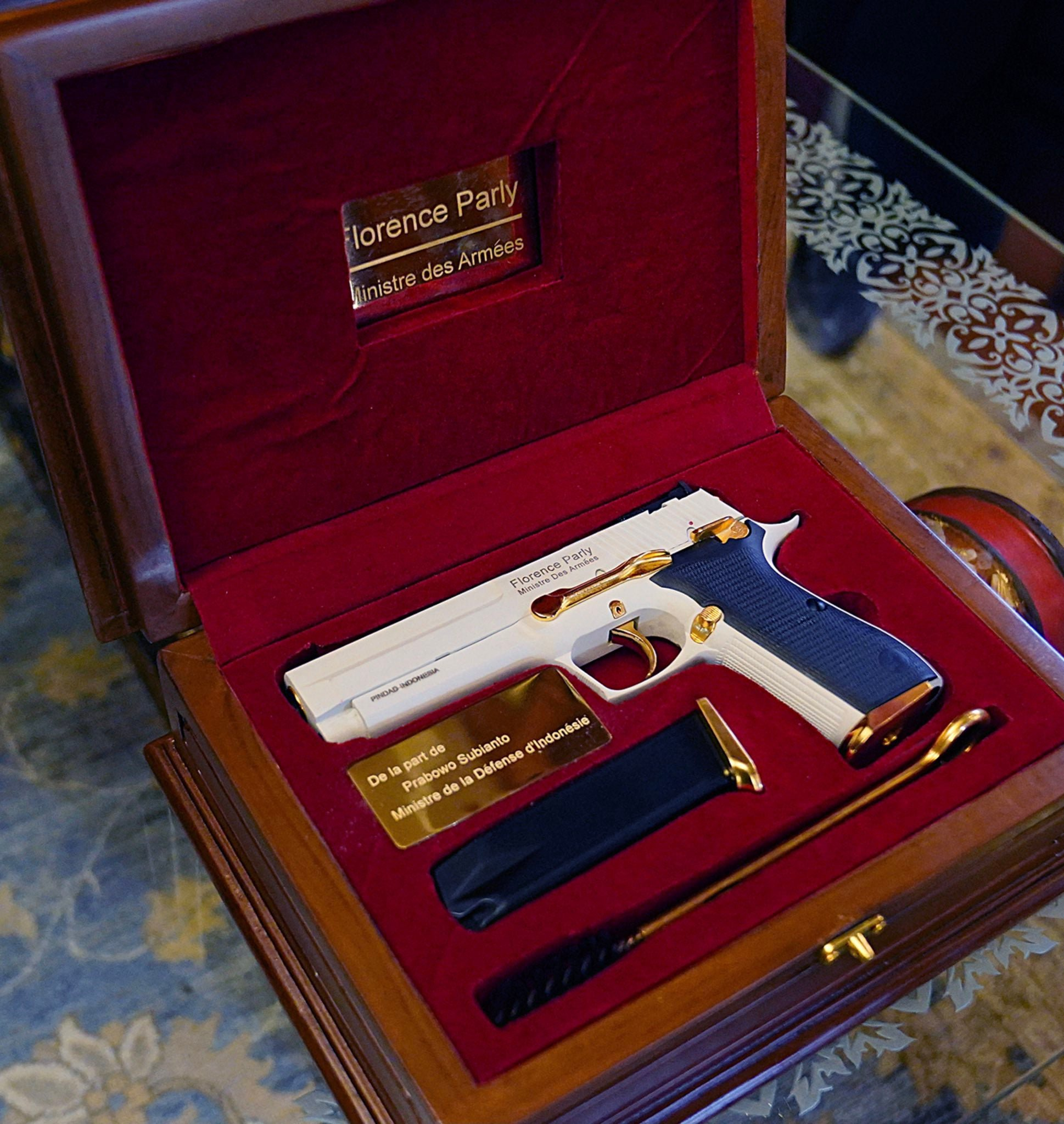
A Pindad G2 Elite with white and gold finish, presented by the Indonesian Minister of Defense to the French Minister of the Armed Forces.
