= Sophea =

Sophea is a surname. Notable people with the surname include:

- Meas Sophea (born 1955), Cambodian general
- Pich Sophea (born 1985), Cambodian singer
- Thun Sophea (born 1979), Cambodian kickboxer

== See also ==
- Sophia (given name)
