= Special Forces Command (Cambodia) =

- បញ្ជាការដ្ឋានទ័ពពិសេស
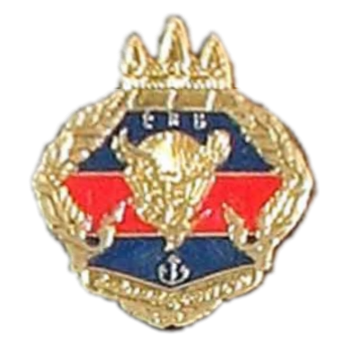
- 911th Special Forces Command Unit Insignia
- Active: 1993–present
- Country: Cambodia
- Allegiance: HM The King
- Branch: Royal Cambodian Army
- Type: Unified combatant army special operations command
- Size: 14 battalions
- Part of: Royal Cambodian Armed Forces
- Garrison/HQ: Kandal Province
- Nickname: SF-911
- Mottos: "អ្នកណាហ៊ានសាក ឬ អ្នកណាខ្លាំងចូលមក" (Khmer) ("Who Dares Try")
- Colors: Red beret

Commanders
- Current commander: Maj Gen Sum Samnang

The Special Forces Command (Khmer: បញ្ជាការដ្ឋានទ័ពពិសេស), previously known as the 911th Special Forces Regiment until July 2020, is the unified combatant command charged with overseeing the various special operations component commands of the Royal Cambodian Army.

== History ==
The unit was created as the 911th Special Forces Regiment (Note: Sometimes known as Brigade 911.) in 1993.

On October 2015, 200 Cambodian National Police officers were trained by the unit's airborne battalions to assist in creating a "special intervention force" unit.

On July 23, 2020, the Malaysian ambassador to Cambodia Eldeen Husaini Mohd Hashim visited the regiment's base to extend offers for its paratroopers to train under the Malaysian Defence Cooperation Programme (MDCP) and the Malaysian Technical Cooperation Programme (MTCP). On July 31, 2020, the regiment was incorporated into the SFC.

On June 22, 2022, Prabowo Subianto (then as defense minister) visited the SFC and met with commandos who used to be under him during training.

== Organization and structure ==
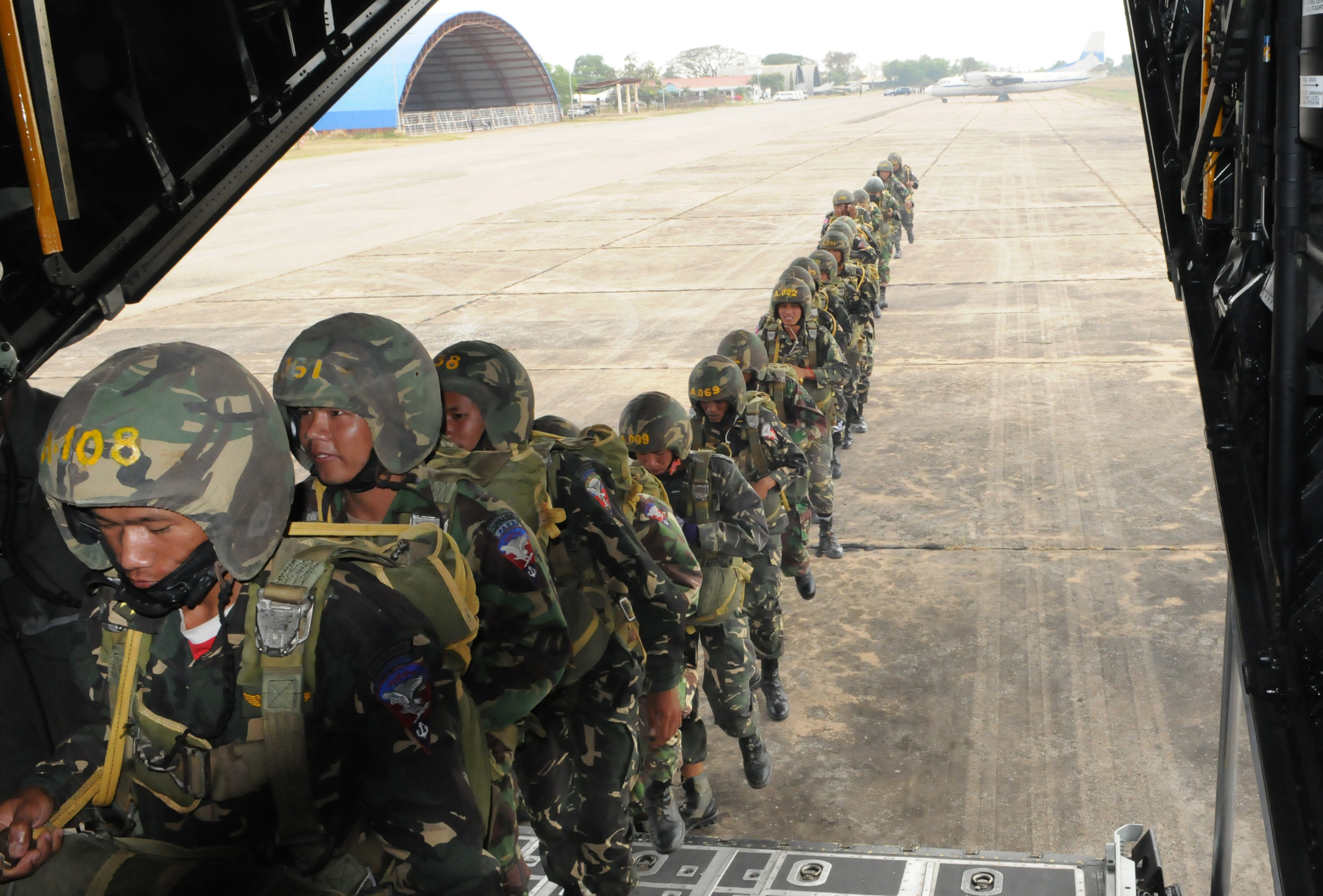
Royal Cambodian National Counter-Terrorism Special Forces training exercise.

The Special Forces Command's headquarters is near Takethmey Village, Kambol Commune, Angsnoul District, Kandal Province. It is under direct command of the High Command Headquarters of Royal Cambodian Armed Forces.

The Special Forces Command has multiple units, including air assault and airborne operations unit, amphibious assault unit, CBRN defense unit, combat diving unit, counterterrorism and hostage rescue unit, executive protection unit, military intelligence unit, maintenance unit, medical unit, military communications unit, mobility and transportation unit, psychological warfare unit, quartermaster unit, selection and training unit, sniper and counter-sniper unit, and special reconnaissance unit.

The Special Forces Command has seven branches with 14 battalions under their control. Following units is distributed in the Battalions:

- Commando 1 to Commando 4 (Airborne Commando)
- Commando 5 to Commando 9 (Assault Commando)
- Commando 10 to Commando 12 (Support Commando)
- Special Group 13 (Executive Protection)
- Counter terrorist Group 14: Cambodia's first specialized counterterrorism and hostage rescue unit, and is the command Special Weapons and Tactics (SWAT) component which supports law enforcement in counterterrorism and hostage rescue operations.

== Training ==
Most of its commandos have graduated from training under Kopassus instructors, under a special program at Batujajar. American instructors have also provided training assistance. In order to graduate from the school, all cadets have to pass the test set. On passing, cadets receive their own red beret and a wings badge.

The SF regularly conduct trainings and joint exercises such as:

- Airborne 11 Courses (Parachuting)
- Counterterrorism and hostage rescue 3 Courses
- Military free-fall (MFF) 3 Courses
- Special forces 6 courses (Commando Red Beret)
- Tactical scuba diving 3 Courses (Chhak Saracen Sea)

== Equipment & Gallery ==
=== Gears ===
Image	Image (when equipped)	Model	Origin
		Future Assault Shell Technology helmet	United States China
		Scalable Plate Carrier	United States China Cambodia
		M81 Battle Dress Uniform	United States China Cambodia
		"Darah Mengalir" Battle Dress Uniform	Indonesia Cambodia
		Type 07 (camouflage)	China

=== Small Arms ===
Image	Name of model	Origin	Type	Calibre	Details
	Pindad G2 Elite	Indonesia	Semi-automatic pistol	9x19mm Parabellum	Used by Special Force Command since 2024.
	CZ P-10 C	Czech Republic	Semi-automatic pistol	9x19mm Parabellum	Used by Special Force Command.
	NR08	China	Submachine gun	9×19mm Parabellum	Chinese copy of Heckler & Koch MP5.
	JH14	China	Submachine gun	9×19mm Parabellum	Seen in training.
	QBZ-95	China	Assault rifle	5.56×45mm NATO	Limited use. Used by special forces and BHQ since 2023.
	Norinco CQ	United States China	Carbine	5.56×45mm NATO	Chinese copy of M4 carbine.
	K1A	Republic of Korea	Carbine	5.56×45mm NATO	Used by Special Forces Command.
	K2C	Republic of Korea	Carbine	5.56×45mm NATO	Used by Special Forces Command.
	Pindad SS2-V5 A1	Indonesia	Carbine	5.56×45mm NATO	Used by Special Forces Command since 2024.
