= Meas Sophea =

Cambodian general

General Meas Sophea
- Born: 9 April 1955 (age 71); Chhouk, Kampot Province, Cambodia
- Military career
- Allegiance: Royal Cambodian Army
- Service years: 1970–present
- Rank: General
- Commands: Intelligence office Chief of Operation; Cabinet of General Staff
- Conflicts: Vietnam War; Cambodian Civil War; Cambodian-Vietnamese War; Khmer Rouge War; 1997 Cambodian coup d'état 2008 Cambodian-Thai stand-off

Meas Sophea (born 9 April 1955) is a senior general in the Royal Cambodian Armed Forces (RCAF). He is a former Deputy Commander-in-Chief of the RCAF and chief of the Royal Cambodian Army.

== Early life and education ==
General Sophea was born in Banieve village, Banieve Commune, Chhouk district, Kampot Province on 9 April 1955. Due to the civil war that ravaged the country (followed by U.S. and South Vietnamese invasion of Cambodia in 1970), he joined the Cambodian National Liberation Front Movement as a private at age 16.

Meas studied at the local elementary school in Banieve. From 1969 to 1970, he was a student at the Chhouk High-School. Due to the civil war in Cambodia, Meas Sophea went to Vietnam to complete his studies between 1975 and 1977, receiving a diploma. He earned his bachelor's degree, master's degree, and completed his Ph.D. in military science at the Military Academy Institute of Da Lat, Vietnam, in 2010.

== Family ==
In 1980, Sophea married Chhor Borey (born on 9 September 1957 in Vealvong village, Kampong Siem district, Kampong Cham province). The couple have three daughters and a son, Meas Sophearith.

== Military experience ==
Meas Sophea led many battles during the civil war between the pro-government army and the Khmer Rouge guerrillas. Battles in which Sophea was a commander include those at: Pailin, Preah Vihear, O'Smach, Koh Kong and Battambang.

During the July 1997 coup, Meas Sophea was one of the commanders who successfully pushed back the Khmer Rouge guerrillas, and 500 fighters loyal to Prince Norodom Ranariddh, into the borders.

In 1998 he successfully commanded the last counter-attack in Anlong Veng, the last stronghold of the Khmer Rouge forces. This led to the capture of Ta Mok, a top Khmer rouge leader.

He is an honorary member of the TNI special forces Kopassus unit, where he received a Red beret in 2005.

== See also ==
- History of Cambodia
- Cambodian Civil War
- Lon Nol
- Khmer Republic
- Hun Sen

== Sources ==
- : The Royal Cambodian Army"
- CNN: "King Sihanouk returns to Cambodia from China"
- CNN: "Last Khmer Rouge fighters surrender in Cambodia"
- BBC News: "Asia-Pacific Khmer Rouge 'Butcher' captured"
- " Video on YouTube
- Vietnam News Agency (VNA): Indonesia, Cambodia agree to increase military cooperation"
