= Brigade 70 (B-70) =

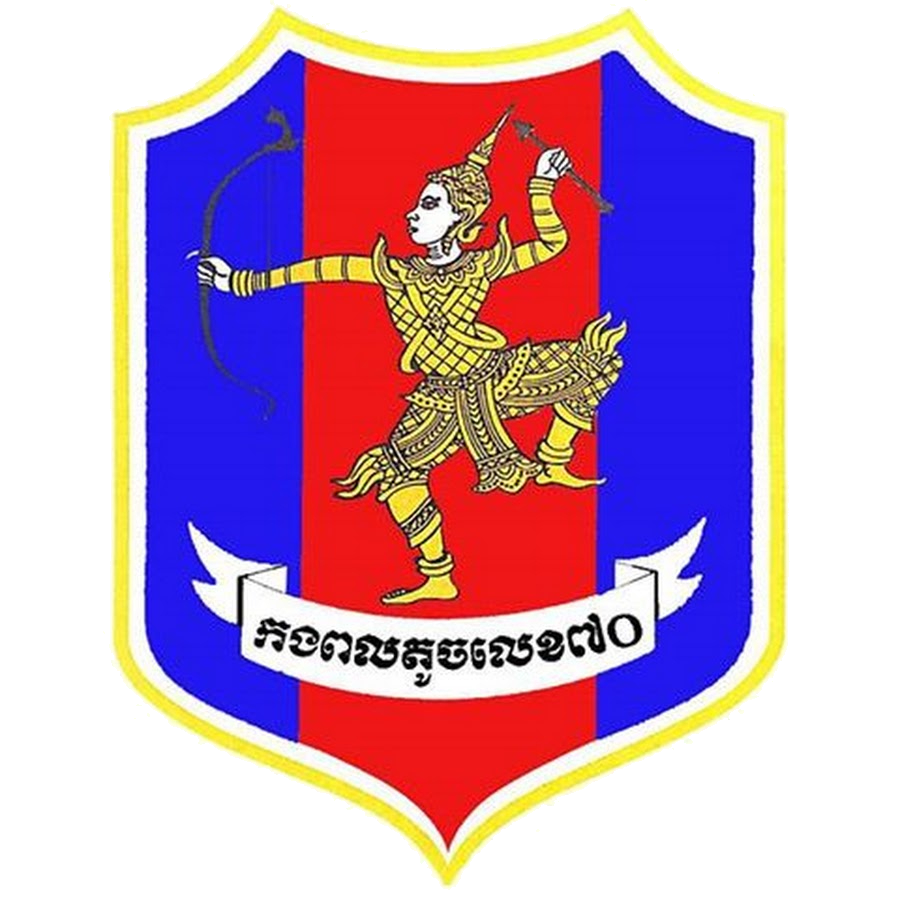
- Active: 1990s-present
- Country: Cambodia
- Allegiance: HM The King
- Branch: Royal Cambodian Army
- Type: Special forces
- Role: Executive protection Special operations
- Size: Brigade
- Part of: Royal Cambodian Armed Forces
- Nickname: B-70

Commanders
- Current commander: Lt General Hem Tha

The Brigade 70 or B-70 is a Cambodian Army unit responsible for protecting Hun Sen, until he created the Bodyguard Headquarters (BHQ) to take over its responsibilities in 2009.

== History ==
Its history is traced back to the Phnom Penh-based Khmer Rouge unit, in charge of detaining and beating anyone to make them confess that they're Khmer Rouge fighters. After the Paris Peace Accords were signed in 1991, the unit became known as Regiment 70. They later became known as Brigade 70 in 1993.

The unit celebrated its 30th anniversary on October 2024.

== Organization ==
B-70's HQ is located at the southwestern part of Phnom Penh.
