= Norinco CQ =

Norinco CQ 5.56
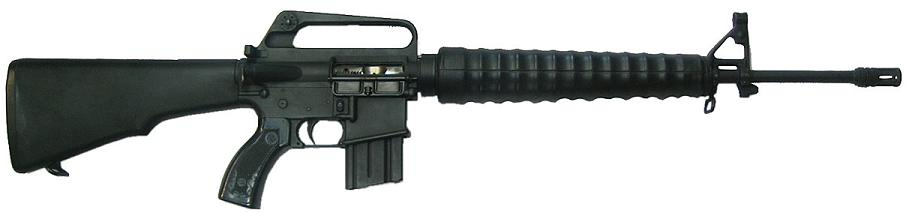
- The NORINCO Type CQ 5.56×45mm NATO assault rifle, right side
- Type: Assault rifle
- Place of origin: China

Service history
- In service: 1980s–present
- Used by: See Operators
- Wars: Soviet–Afghan War; War in Darfur; Ethnic violence in South Sudan; Libyan Civil War; Syrian Civil War; South Sudanese Civil War; Sudanese civil war (2023–present); Gaza war 2025 Cambodia–Thailand conflict

Production history
- Designer: Norinco
- Manufacturer: Norinco
- Produced: 1983–present
- Variants: See Variants

Specifications
- Mass: 2.9 kg (Empty)
- Length: 1000 mm (39,3 in)
- Barrel length: 508 mm (20 in.)
- Cartridge: 5.56×45mm NATO (only non-NATO standard 55-grain M193 "Ball" cartridge), .223 Remington (Semi-automatic sporter model)
- Caliber: 5.56mm
- Action: Gas operated, rotating bolt
- Rate of fire: 900 RPM (Select-fire version only)
- Muzzle velocity: 990 m/s (3,200 ft/s)
- Maximum firing range: 460 m (1,510 ft)
- Feed system: 20/30-round detachable box magazine (STANAG 4179)
- Sights: Iron sights

The Type CQ is an unlicensed Chinese variant of the M16 rifle manufactured by Sichuan Changqing Machine Works, a subsidiary of Norinco. According to the Norinco website, the rifle is officially known as CQ 5.56. CQ stands for ChangQing, the name of its manufacturer.

== History ==
China began manufacturing weapons that were captured during the Vietnam War from the Americans and their allies after North Vietnam, Khmer Rouge and Pathet Lao forces handed it over to them and as well as other communist allies such as Warsaw Pact and North Korea for evaluation.

The CQ was first introduced in the early 1980s. This weapon is chambered for 5.56×45mm cartridges and it was intended for export sales. Two variants of the CQ rifle were made: the CQ 5.56, also known as the CQ-311 or CQ M-311, the select-fire variant for Military/LE sales; and the CQ M311-1, the semiautomatic version for the civilian market. Later, a carbine variant was introduced, called the CQ 5.56mm Type A. The semi-auto sport rifle has been successful in the civilian market.

== Design ==
The CQ is a gas-operated, rotating-bolt full-automatic firearm that feeds from factory-made 20- or 30-round magazines (STANAG magazine clones), firing the M193 "Ball" 5.56×45mm NATO cartridge (manufactured in China by Norinco as the Type CJ cartridge). The Type CQ rifle has a three-position fire selector: safe, single shot, and full-automatic fire.

=== Accessories ===
According to the manufacturer's website, the Type CQ assault rifle can be equipped with an under-barrel grenade launcher.

=== Differences ===
Though it has the same look as the M16 rifle, there are some modifications to various parts.

The Type CQ rifle, in both its military/LE and civilian variants, has a 1:12 rifling pitch which allows it to properly stabilize the M193 "Ball" variant of the 5.56 mm ammunition or the Type CJ Chinese clone, as well as any .223 Remington commercial cartridge variant that can be stabilized by the 1:12 pitch rifling barrel (normally Varmint or other simple sporter cartridges, up to a maximum bullet weight of 55 gr (3.6 g)).

Type CQ is chambered in "5.56×45mm NATO", but it will not optimally stabilize the NATO standard 5.56mm ammunition (the SS109, M855 in US service), which requires a 1:9–1:7 pitch rifling barrel due to a bullet weight of 62 gr (4.0 g).

== Variants ==
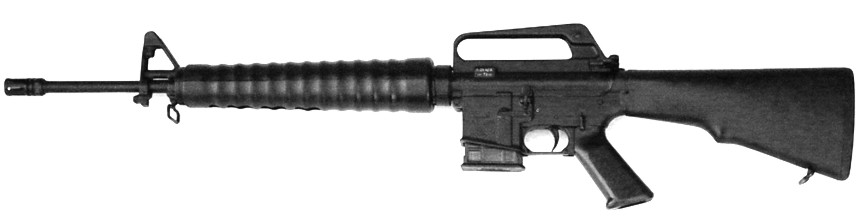
Norinco Type CQ M311-1 .223-Remington semi-automatic rifle – Italian civilian market model, with 5-rounds DPMS clear plastic magazine

=== CQ 5.56 ===
Also known as the CQ-311 or the CQ M-311, the CQ is the select-fire assault rifle version intended for military and police use.

The weapon sports a 508 mm (20.0 in) barrel with a 1:12 rifling twist.

=== CQ 311-1 ===
Also known as the or the CQ M311-1, this rifle is the civilian version of the military model.

The CQ M311-1 is manufactured with a semi-automatic only trigger group, and the selector switch only has two positions, for safety and fire. The 1:12 barrel rifling allows the rifle to properly shoot and stabilize light .223 Remington commercial cartridges (55 gr (3.6 g) and under) and the military surplus 5.56×45mm M193 "Ball" ammunition widely available on the market.

=== CQ A ===
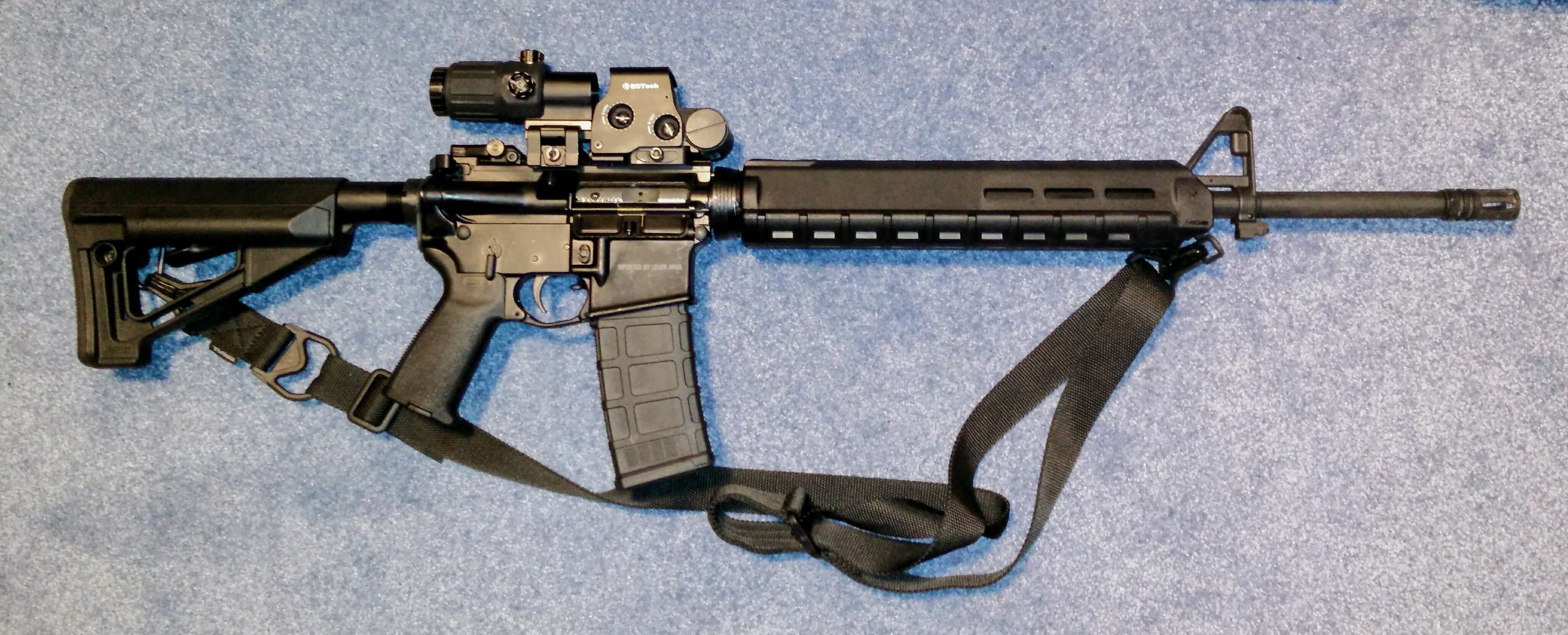
Norinco CQ-A semi-automatic rifle with 20" barrel sold in the Canadian civilian market. Shown with an EOTech style sight and Magpul furniture.

This variant introduced in the year 2006 in several defense expos worldwide is a copy of the American M4A1 carbine.

=== CQ-D ===
The CQ-D is an export-specific automatic rifle of the CQ family, featuring upgraded Picatinny rails and foregrip and offered by the China Jing An Import & Export Corp, with reference to the Heckler & Koch HK416.

=== CS/LM11 ===
The CS/LM11 squad automatic weapon was unveiled in 2010 at foreign weapons expo conventions, made by Huaqing Machinery Company. It can fire both SS109 and M193-based 5.56 NATO ammunition. It is an offshoot of the CQ, with improvements made to barrel from 6,000 to 12,000 rounds fired.

=== Foreign production ===
==== Armada rifle ====
The Armada rifle is a clone of the Norinco CQ manufactured by Shooter's Arms Manufacturing or S.A.M., also known as Shooter's Arms Guns & Ammo Corporation, headquartered in Metro Cebu, the Philippines.

S.A.M. launched the Armada rifle in 2009, making it available to local government units and/or active law enforcement and military agencies in the Philippines and abroad. The Armada is a select-fire rifle manufactured in forged aluminum, uses a 22 in (560 mm) barrel with a 1:9 right-hand twist (able to stabilize both M193 "Ball" and SS109/M855 variants of the 5.56mm cartridge), Norinco CQ-style plastic parts (grip, stock, handguard), flip-up rear sight adjustable for windage, front post sight adjustable for elevation, and feeds by STANAG magazines. The total weight of the weapon unloaded is claimed to reach 3.3 kg (7.3 lb), with an overall length of 38.5 in (980 mm).

A carbine version of the Armada rifle, similar to the Norinco CQ 5.56mm Type A, has also been launched under the name of Trailblazer.

==== DIO Model S-5.56 ====
In the year 2003, the Defense Industries Organization of Iran began marketing the S-5.56 rifle (also known as the Sayyad), an unlicensed clone of the Type CQ. It is also known as SRAG-15. It was first unveiled in the West in 2001.

The S-5.56 was originally designed for export sales, but has been shown in use by Quds Force, the special forces of the Iranian Islamic Revolutionary Guard.

The rifle itself is offered in two variants. The S-5.56 A1 with a 19.9 in (510 mm) barrel and 1:12 pitch rifling (1 turn in 305 mm), optimised for the use of the M193 Ball cartridge. The S-5.56 A3 with a 20 in (510 mm) barrel and a 1:7 pitch rifling (1 turn in 177, 8 mm), optimized for the use of the SS109 cartridge.

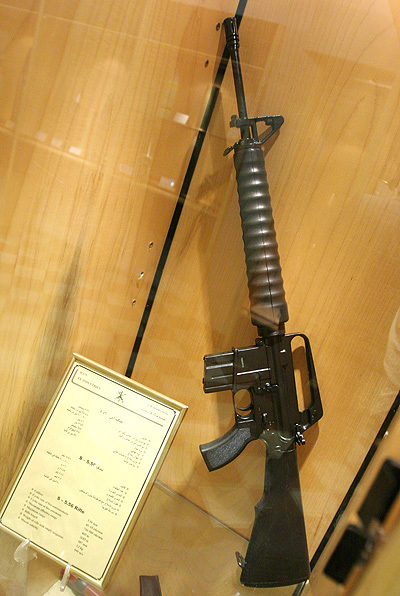
The S-5.56 Sayyad rifle at the DIO tour.

== Civilian sales ==
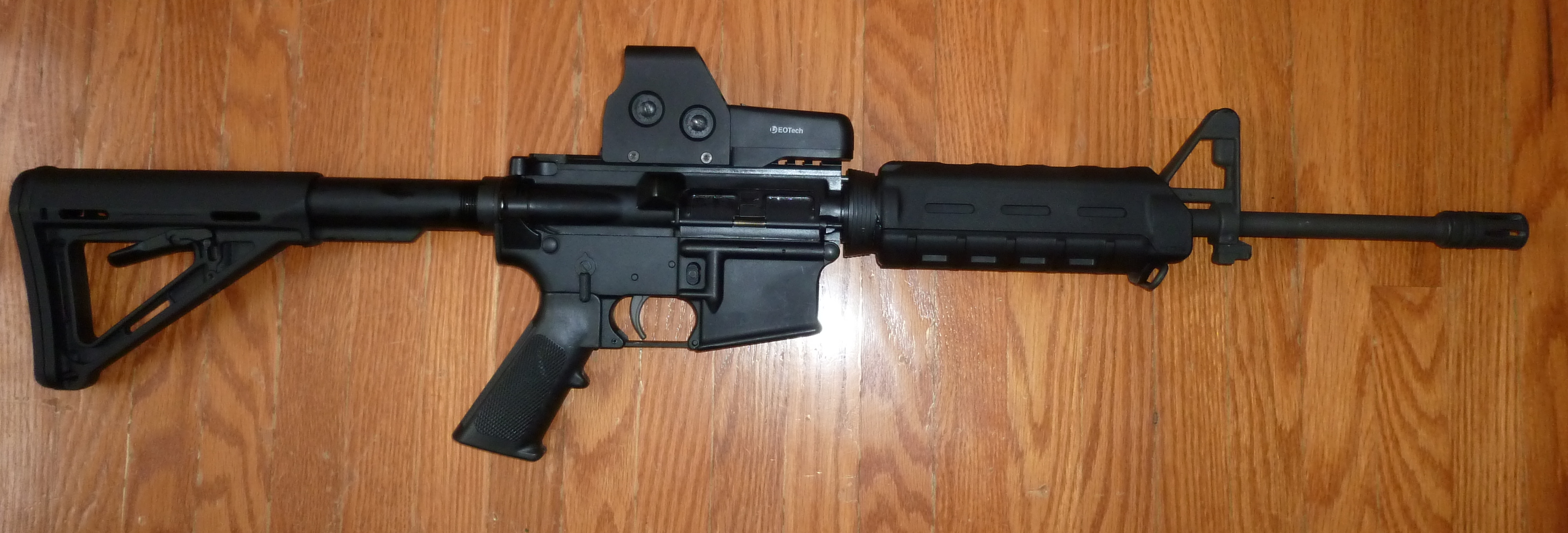
A Dominion Arms DA 556, made by Norinco for the Canadian civilian market, with an EOTech sight, and Magpul furniture.

The CQ M311-1 was first available in the North American market in 1987, when only 500 units were sold before the import was halted; reasons for this halt are stated to be several by many sources: the restrictions applied in the United States since 1989 (an import ban signed by George H. W. Bush on 41 types of military-style firearms in the aftermath of the Stockton massacre), a copyright infringement lawsuit from Colt against Norinco or an agreement between the two companies.

The CQ M311-1 semiautomatic rifle was available in Canada until it was reclassified as a Prohibited Firearm on May 1, 2020, while any further import into the United States still remains impossible due to legal restrictions.

A semi-automatic version of the CQ-A carbine was available on the civilian market for sports shooters in Canada (until their prohibition), Italy, Ukraine, and South Africa.

== Operators ==
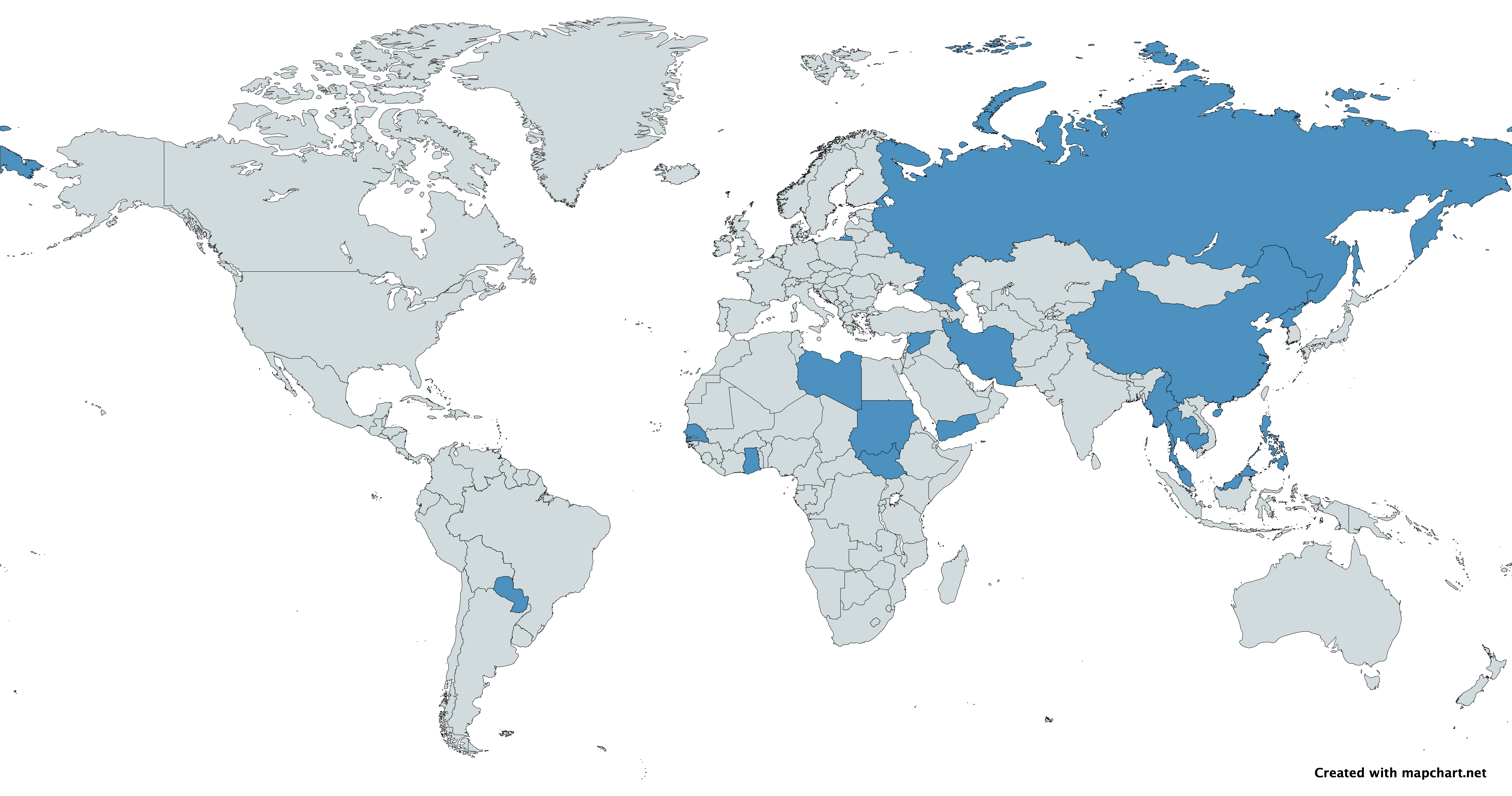
Map with Norinco CQ users in blue

- Cambodia: Type CQ 311 used by Royal Cambodian Army, along with M16 rifle. CQ 5.56mm Type A used by 911 Para-Commando Special Forces.
- China: Said to be used by the People's Armed Police Snow Leopard Commando Unit, Chongqing Police's SWAT unit (Lightning Assault Team) and Pengzhou Police.
- Iran: Used by Revolutionary Guards special forces. CQ 5.56mm and CQ Type A (limited quantity) variants. Iran locally produces its own variant, S-5.56.
- Libya: Used by National Liberation Army.
- North Korea: CQ and CQ-A used by Korean People's Army Ground Force
- Myanmar: Produced locally MDI CQ
- Paraguay: Norinco CQ-5.56mm Type A adopted by the Paraguayan Army Forces.
- Philippines: 6000 units of the CQ-A5 rifle were donated by the Chinese government to the AFP were transferred to the PNP in two batches in June and October 2017 respectively.
- Russia: 1000 CQ-A rifles were shipped to Russia in 2022 from China.
- Senegal
- South Sudan: Used by Sudan People's Liberation Army/Movement, South Sudan Liberation Movement and Lou Nuer and Murle militias
- Sri Lanka: CQ-D imported for field testing in 2024.
- Sudan: CQ M311-1 Used by the South Sudan Democratic Movement/Army
- Syria: Used by the Syrian Arab Army, captured from rebels in the Syrian Civil War.
- Thailand: Sold to the Royal Thai Navy and Air and Coastal Defense Command.
- Yemen

== Bibliography ==
- Jones, Richard D.; Ness, Leland S., eds. (2010). Jane's Infantry Weapons 2010-2011. Jane's Publishing. ISBN 978-0710629081.
