= Royal Cambodian Army =

Land warfare branch of Cambodia's military

- កងទ័ពជើងគោក; Kâng Toăp Cheung Koŭk
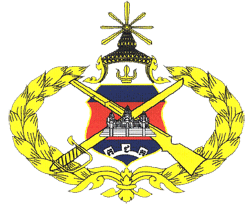
- Emblem of the Royal Cambodian Army
- Founded: 9 November 1953; 72 years ago
- Country: Cambodia
- Allegiance: King of Cambodia
- Type: Army
- Role: Land warfare
- Size: 75,000 men
- Part of: Royal Cambodian Armed Forces
- Garrison/HQ: Phnom Penh, Cambodia
- Mottos: "ការពារព្រះរាជាណាចក្រកម្ពុជា" (Khmer) ("Defend the Kingdom of Cambodia") "វានឹងមិនបញ្ចប់លុះត្រាតែយើងឈ្នះ" (Khmer) ("It won’t end unless we win")
- Colours: Red, Blue
- Anniversaries: 9 November
- Engagements: Indochina Wars; First Indochina War; Second Indochina War; Cambodian Civil War; Third Indochina War; Cambodian–Vietnamese War; Cambodian conflict (1979–1998); 1997 clashes in Cambodia; Cambodian–Thai border dispute; 2008–2011 Cambodian–Thai border crisis; 2025 Cambodia–Thailand border crisis

Commanders
- Current commander: General Mao Sophan
- Notable commanders: General Meas Sophea; General Hun Manet

Insignia
- Unit colour

The Royal Cambodian Army (Khmer: កងទ័ពជើងគោក, Kâng Toăp Cheung Koŭk; lit. 'Land Force') is a part of the Royal Cambodian Armed Forces. It has ground forces which numbered 85,000 divided into eleven divisions of infantry, with integrated armour and artillery support. The Royal Army is under the jurisdiction of the Ministry of National Defence.

== Military organisation ==
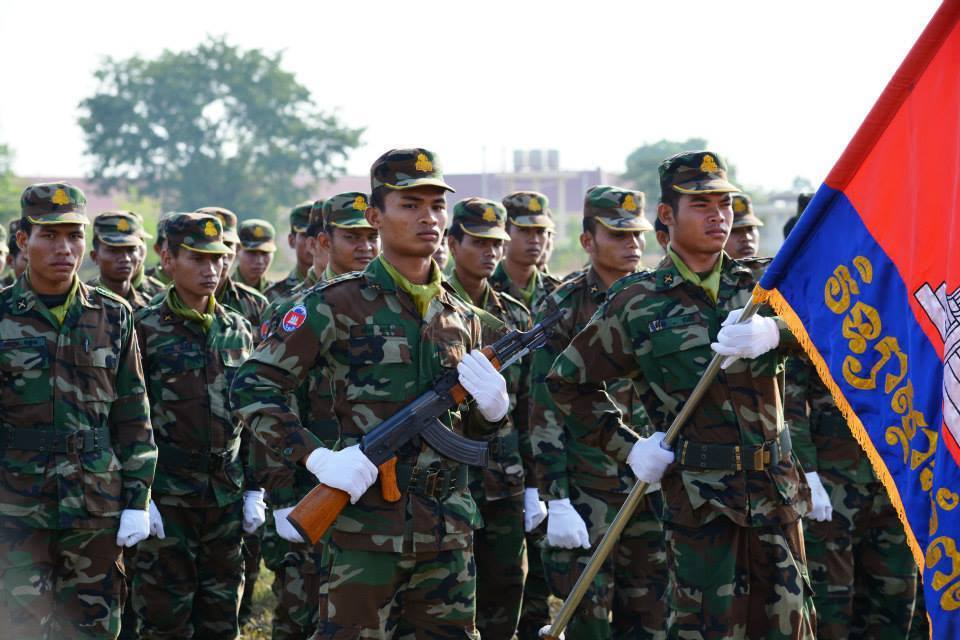
Royal Cambodian Army soldiers

Under the current military plan and divisions, every military region has a full division size. Each division will be supplemented by a mobile reinforcement division in Phnom Penh. The country is divided into six, until recently five, military regions, each comprising three or four provinces. There are garrisons in major cities and major army bases.

Lieutenant General Mao Sophan is the commander of the Royal Cambodian Army.

The forces are deployed as required across the country and in operations, with bases as follows:

- 1st Military Region (យោធភូមិភាគទី១): Headquarters are in Stung Treng and the region covers the provinces of Stung Treng, Kratié, Ratanakiri and Mondulkiri.
- 2nd Military Region (យោធភូមិភាគទី២): Headquarters are in Kampong Cham and the region covers the provinces of Kampong Cham, Prey Veng, and Svay Rieng.
- 3rd Military Region (យោធភូមិភាគទី៣): Headquarters are in Kampong Speu and the region covers the provinces of Kampong Speu, Takéo, Kampot, Sihanoukville, Koh Kong and Kep.
- 4th Military Region (យោធភូមិភាគទី៤): Headquarters are in Siem Reap and the region covers the provinces of Siem Reap, Oddar Meanchey, Preah Vihear, and Kampong Thom.
- 5th Military Region (យោធភូមិភាគទី៥): Headquarters are in Battambang and the region covers the provinces of Battambang, Pursat, Banteay Meanchey and Pailin.
- Special Military Region (យោធភូមិភាគពិសេស): Headquarters are in the capital, Phnom Penh and the region covers the provinces of Kampong Chhnang, Kandal and the greater municipality of Phnom Penh.

Every military region is under the command of a major general, assisted by a chief of staff with a rank of a brigadier general. In every province, there is a military base called a military operation zone under the command of a colonel.

== Peacekeeping operations ==
The RCAF has sent RCAF personnel to various hotspots as part of the Kingdom of Cambodia's role as a member of the United Nations. Mostly engineers and logistical units, a total of 6,822 soldiers, of them 369 are women, have been so far sent to 10 peacekeeping missions in nine countries such as:

- Central African Republic
- Chad
- Cyprus
- Lebanon
- Mali
- South Sudan
- Sudan
- Syria
- Yemen

== Army ranks and insignia ==
=== Commissioned officer ranks ===
The rank insignia of commissioned officers.

| Rank group | General / flag officers | | | | | Senior officers | | | Junior officers |
|---|---|---|---|---|---|---|---|---|---|---|---|
| Royal Cambodian Army |
| Royal Cambodian Army | នាយឧត្ដមសេនីយ៍ផុតលេខ; Neay utdamsenei phot lek | នាយឧត្ដមសេនីយ៍ Neay utdamsenei | ឧត្ដមសេនីយ៍ឯក; Utdamsenei ek | ឧត្តមសេនីយ៍ទោ Utdamsenei tou | ឧត្តមសេនីយ៍ត្រី Utdamsenei trei | វរសេនីយ៍ឯក; Veareasenei ek | វរសេនីយ៍ទោ Veareasenei tou | វរសេនីយ៍ត្រី Veareasenei trei | អនុសេនីយ៍ឯក; Anusenei ek | អនុសេនីយ៍ទោ Anusenei tou | អនុសេនីយ៍ត្រី Anusenei trei |

=== Other ranks ===
The rank insignia of non-commissioned officers and enlisted personnel.

| Rank group | Senior NCOs | | | | | Junior NCOs | | Enlisted |
|---|---|---|---|---|---|---|---|---|---|
| Royal Cambodian Army |
| Royal Cambodian Army | ព្រឹន្ទបាលឯក; Pruentobal ek | ព្រឹន្ទបាលទោ Pruentobal tou | ពលបាលឯក; Polobal ek | ពលបាលទោ Polobal tou | ពលបាលត្រី Polobal trei | នាយឯក; Neay ek | នាយទោ Neay tou | ពលឯក; Pol ek | ពលទោ Pol tou |

== See also ==
- Cambodian Civil War
- Khmer National Army
- Khmer National Armed Forces
- Royal Cambodian Armed Forces
- Royal Cambodian Air Force
- Royal Cambodian Navy
- Weapons of the Cambodian Civil War
