= 2017 in Georgia (country) =

- Decades: 1990s; 2000s; 2010s; 2020s
- See also: Other events of 2017; List of years in Georgia (country)

The following lists events in 2017 in Georgia.

== Incumbents ==
=== National ===
- President: Giorgi Margvelashvili (17 November 2013 – present)
- Prime Minister: Giorgi Kvirikashvili (30 December 2015 – present)
- Chairperson of Parliament: Irakli Kobakhidze (18 November 2016 – present)

=== Autonomous republics ===
==== Adjara ====
- Chairman of the Government: Zurab Pataradze (15 July 2016 – present)
- Chairman of the Supreme Council: Davit Gabaidze (28 November 2016 – present)

==== Abkhazia ====
- Chairman of Government (-in-exile): Vakhtang Kolbaia (acting; 8 April 2013 – present)
- Chairman of the Supreme Council (-in-exile): Elguja Gvazava (20 March 2009 – present)

=== Disputed territories ===
==== Abkhazia ====
- President: Raul Khadjimba (25 September 2014 – present)
- Prime Minister: Beslan Bartsits (5 August 2016 – present)
- Chairman of People's Assembly: Valeri Bganba (3 April 2012 – 13 April 2017), Valeri Kvarchia (13 April 2017 – present)

==== South Ossetia ====
- President: Leonid Tibilov (19 April 2012 – 23 April 2017), Anatoly Bibilov (23 April 2017 – present)
- Prime Minister: Domenty Kulumbegov (20 January 2014 – 16 May 2017), Erik Pukhayev (16 May 2017 – present)
- Chairman of Parliament: Anatoliy Bibilov (23 June 2014 – 7 June 2017), Pyotr Gasiev (7 June 2017 – present)

== Events ==
=== January ===
- 11 January – Georgian Energy Minister Kakha Kaladze announces the country's government agrees to the Russian energy giant Gazprom's new payment terms of Russian gas transit to Armenia via Georgia, which envisage to monetize the current commodity payment scheme by 2018. President Giorgi Margvelashvili, opposition parties, and civil society organizations denounce the deal as a threat to Georgia's security and economy and criticize the government's refusal to disclose essential details of the agreement.
- 12 January – Following months of internal tensions, the largest opposition United National Movement (UNM) party splits, with many leading members announcing they will start a new political force; the move leaves UNM with only six members in the parliament. The new entity, named the Movement for Freedom—European Georgia, is joined by the former Tbilisi mayor Gigi Ugulava, released from prison on 6 January.
- 27 January – President Margvelashvili pardons five former Defense Ministry officials convicted for exceeding powers in the high-profile "cable case", which led to a split in the ruling Georgian Dream coalition in 2014.

=== February ===
- 2 February – The European Parliament approves a long-awaited visa-free travel regime in the Schengen zone for Georgian nationals. The procedure is finalized on 1 March 2017 and enters into force on 28 March 2017.
- 10 February – Police arrests an archpriest of the Georgian Orthodox Church, accusing him of carrying sodium cyanide in his luggage prior to his departure to Germany, where the Catholicos Patriarch Ilia II is being treated. Prosecutors say an alleged murder plot targeted "a high-ranking cleric", but reject reports that he is Ilia II.
- 14 February – The Georgian Ministry of Defense reintroduces compulsory military service eight months after it was abolished.
- 19 February – Thousands of citizens, opposition politicians, and civic society activists rally in support of the broadcasting company Rustavi 2 amid ongoing ownership dispute which critics say is orchestrated by the authorities to silence the opposition-leaning media.

=== March ===
- 2 March – The Supreme Court of Georgia grants the ownership rights of Rustavi 2 TV, a popular television channel, to its former co-owner Kibar Khalvashi, drawing protests from the Rustavi 2 journalists, opposition politicians, and civil society groups as well as expressions of concern by the United States embassy and OSCE Representative on Freedom of the Media. On 3 March, the European Court of Human Rights temporarily suspends the enforcement of the Supreme Court’s controversial decision.
- 11 March – Around twenty police officers and protesters are injured after a riot breaks out in Batumi sparked by a local man's refusal to accept a fine for wrong parking. The protesters have accused the region's police chief of disregard of the local population's interest.
- 12 March – Breakaway Abkhazia holds a parliamentary election, with vote going into runoff for 22 out of 35 seats. Georgia and many other countries such as the United States, Poland, Azerbaijan, Canada, Estonia, Finland, Lithuania, and Ukraine, as well as NATO refuse to recognize the elections.
- 24 March – The UN Human Rights Council adopts its first ever resolution (A/HRC/34/L.18) on Georgia, reaffirming its commitment to the sovereignty and territorial integrity of Georgia within its internationally recognized borders and calling for "immediate access" for international human rights groups in breakaway Abkhazia and South Ossetia. The resolution triggers an angry reaction from Russia, which denounces the document as "clearly politicized and aimed against Abkhazia, South Ossetia and Russia".

=== April ===
- 4 April – Europol and Georgia sign an Agreement on Operational and Strategic Cooperation in fighting terrorism and cross-border crime.
- 9 April – Anatoly Bibilov wins the presidential election in breakaway South Ossetia, condemned by Georgia, US, and several other countries as "illegitimate".
- 21 April – Authorities in breakaway Abkhazia begin issuing residence permits to ethnic Georgians of Abkhazia, who continue to hold Georgian citizenship following a four-year-long uncertainty over their legal status. They still remain deprived of political rights.

=== May ===
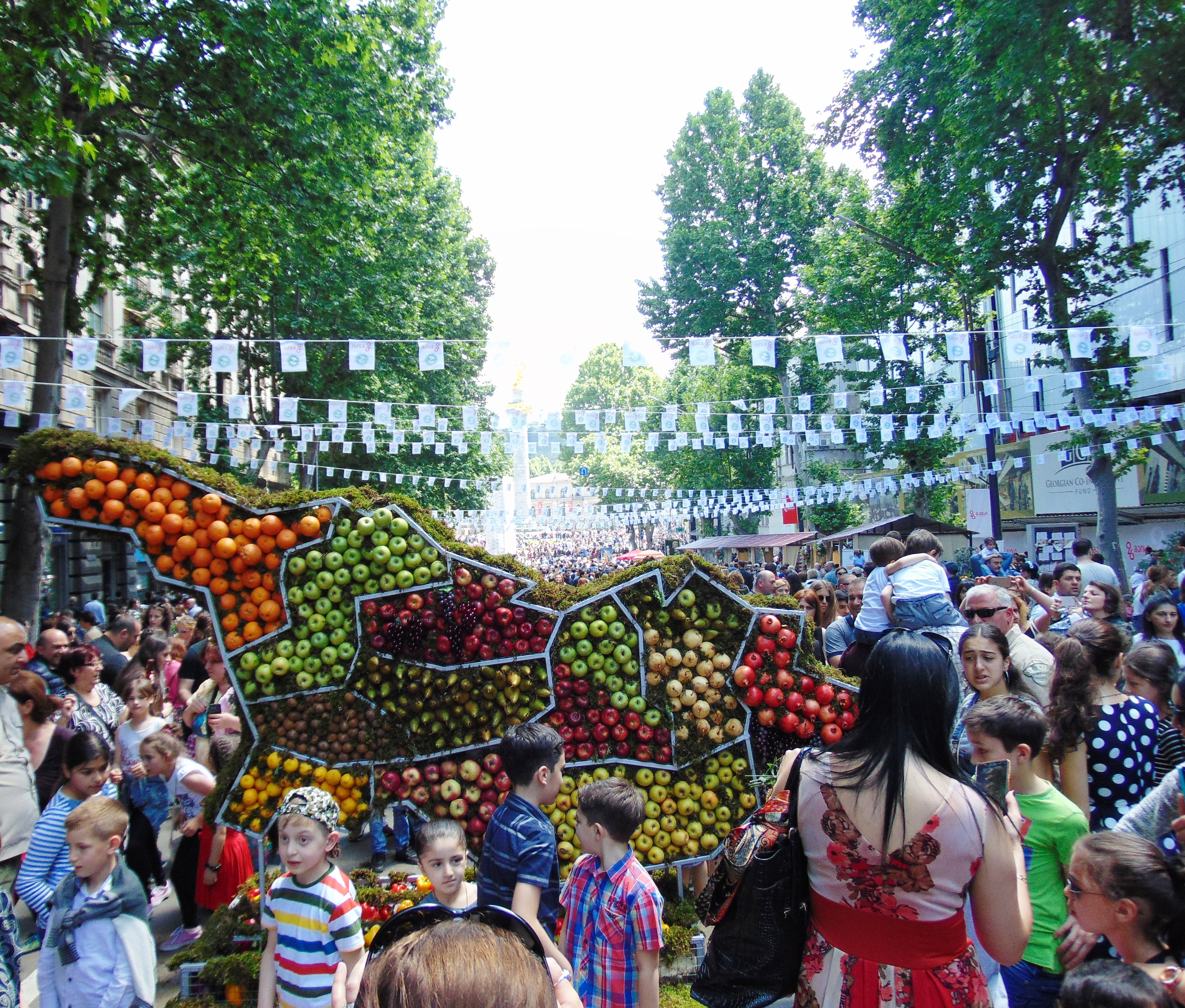
Georgia's Independence Day celebrations in Tbilisi. 26 May 2017.

- 5 May – The United States President Donald Trump signs the Consolidated Appropriations Act, 2017, which includes a provision that no appropriated funds may be used to support "the Russian occupation of the Georgian territories of Abkhazia and Tskhinvali Region/South Ossetia" or to assist the governments of other countries that have recognized the two territories' independence.
- 9 May – Prime Minister Giorgi Kvirikashvili and the U.S. Secretary of State Rex Tillerson sign the General Security of Information Agreement during Kvirikashvili's three-day official visit to the US, in the course of which he also meets President Donald Trump and Vice President Mike Pence.
- 13 May – Georgia and the People's Republic of China sign a Free Trade Agreement.
- 18 May – Russia signs with Abkhaz authorities an agreement on the establishment of the joint Russian-Abkhaz "Information-Coordination Center of Internal Affairs Agencies" to be based in the region's capital Sukhumi. The issues of its aims, structure, and financing stirs up a controversy in Abkhazia. Georgia condemns the move as a "clear proof of factual annexation process of the occupied region."
- 26–29 May – Tbilisi hosts the NATO Parliamentary Assembly's (NATO–PA) Spring Session, a rare instance of NATO–PA having their meeting in a non-member country. The Assembly, meeting in Georgia for the first time, passes a declaration reaffirming its support of Georgia's Euro-Atlantic integration.
- 29 May – The Azerbaijani journalist and opposition political activist Afgan Mukhtarli disappears in Tbilisi and reappears 24 hours later in Azerbaijani border police custody in what rights groups say is an abduction, while charges against him leveled by Azerbaijan are politically motivated. Responding to accusations, Georgia's State Security Service denies involvement.

=== June ===
- 10 June – Street protests take place in Tbilisi, Batumi, and Kutaisi in response to the arrest of the Birja Mafia rapper duo on charges of illegal purchase and possession of excess amount of MDMA and criticizing the government's "repressive" drug policy. One of the arrested musicians claims drugs were planted by the police in response to the duo's recent music video mocking police. On 12 June, the duo are released on bail, while the Georgian Chief Prosecutor's Office launches investigation into alleged police abuse of authority.
- 30 June – The Parliament of Georgia approves amendments to the election code and four related laws, criticized by opposition parties and civil society organizations as giving an undue advantage to the ruling Georgian Dream party.
- 30 June –The Parliament of Georgia approves the amendments to the Local Self-Government Code, reducing the number of self-governing cities from twelve to five. The amendments, criticized by the opposition and civil society organizations, deprive Telavi, Mtskheta, Gori, Akhaltsikhe, Ambrolauri, Ozurgeti, and Zugdidi of the status. They are to be merged with the homonymous self-governing communities. President Giorgi Margvelashvili's vetoes on the amendments to the Local Self-Government Code and the Election Law are overruled by the Parliament on 27 July.

=== July ===
- 10 July – The renovated medieval Bagrati Cathedral is delisted from UNESCO's List of World Heritage Sites on account of the "major reconstruction detrimental to its integrity and authenticity", while the Gelati Monastery returns to the List seven years after it was added to the UNESCO List of World Heritage in Danger.
- 14 July – Ultranationalists hold the anti-immigration "March of Georgians" rally in downtown Tbilisi, while representatives of opposition parties, civil society organizations, and media outlets stage a counter-protest rally against Russian occupation near the village of Bershueti, close to the separatist entity of South Ossetia.
- 26 July – The separatist government of Abkhazia decrees granting Abkhaz citizenship to the ethnic Georgians in the Gali district willing to change their declared ethnic identity from Georgian to Abkhaz.
- 30 July–12 August – The multinational, U.S. Army Europe-led exercise Noble Partner takes place at the Vaziani Training Area near Tbilisi as home station training for the Georgian light infantry company designated for the NATO Response Force.
- 31 July – Mike Pence, Vice President of the United States, arrives on a two-day visit in Tbilisi, attending the ongoing multinational Noble Partner military drills and reassuring the Georgian leadership of the US support.

=== August ===
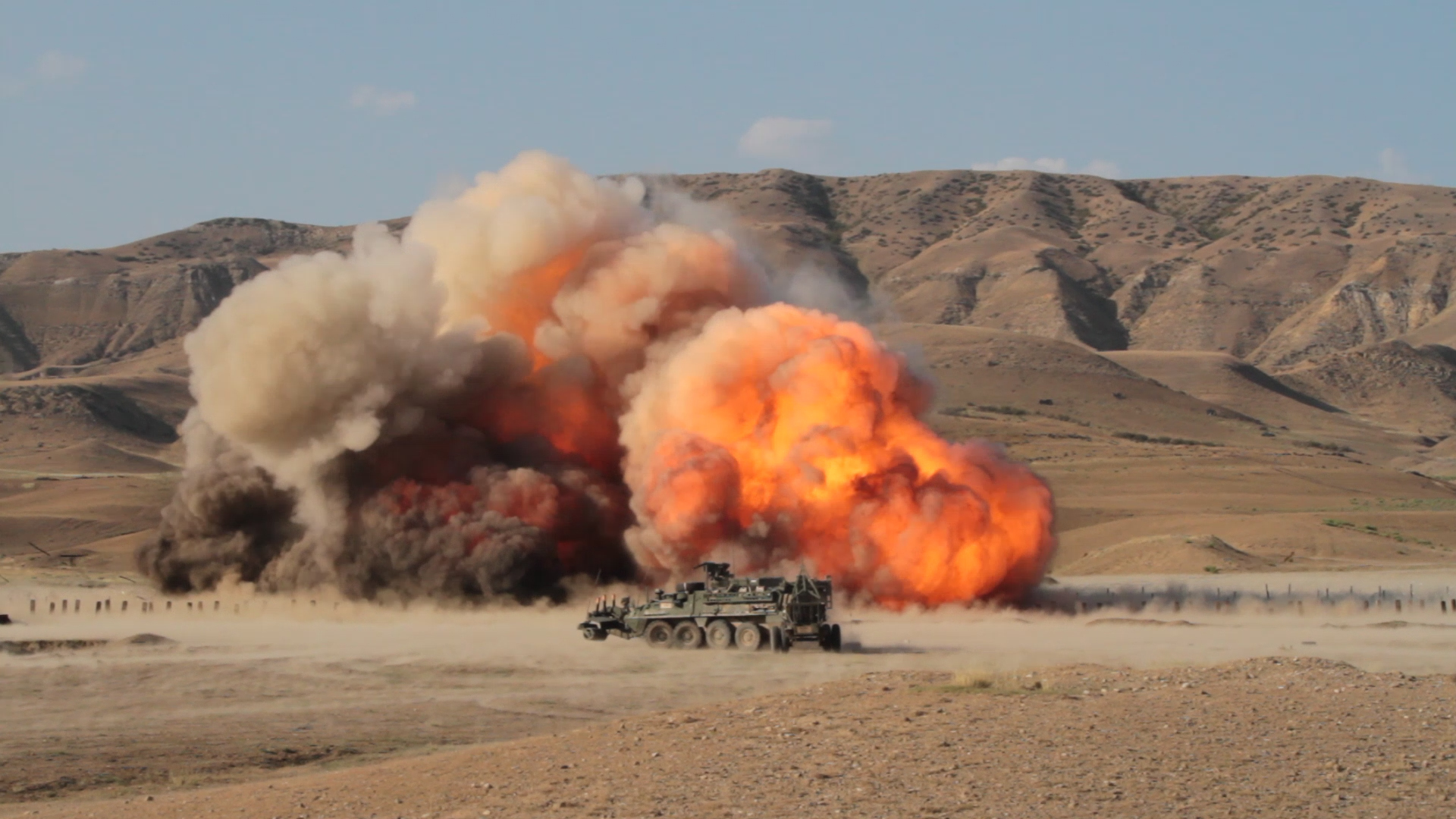
The Noble Partner 17 drills at Vaziani. 10 August 2017.

- 2 August – Donald Trump, President of the United States, signs into law the Countering America’s Adversaries Through Sanctions Act, which, inter alia, makes reference to Russia's "illegal occupation of South Ossetia and Abkhazia in Georgia" and its disregard of "the terms of the August 2008 ceasefire agreement".
- 2 August – An explosion at an Abkhaz military armament warehouse in the area of village Arsauli (Primorskoye), Gudauta District, in breakaway Abkhazia kills two Russian tourists and wounds at least 64 people. Abkhazia-based Russian forces are invoked to deal with the consequences of the explosion.
- 8 August – Vladimir Putin, President of Russia, visits breakaway Abkhazia on the 9th anniversary of the Russo–Georgian War, drawing condemnation from the Georgian Foreign Ministry, the EU Delegation to Georgia, and the U.S. Department of State.

=== September ===
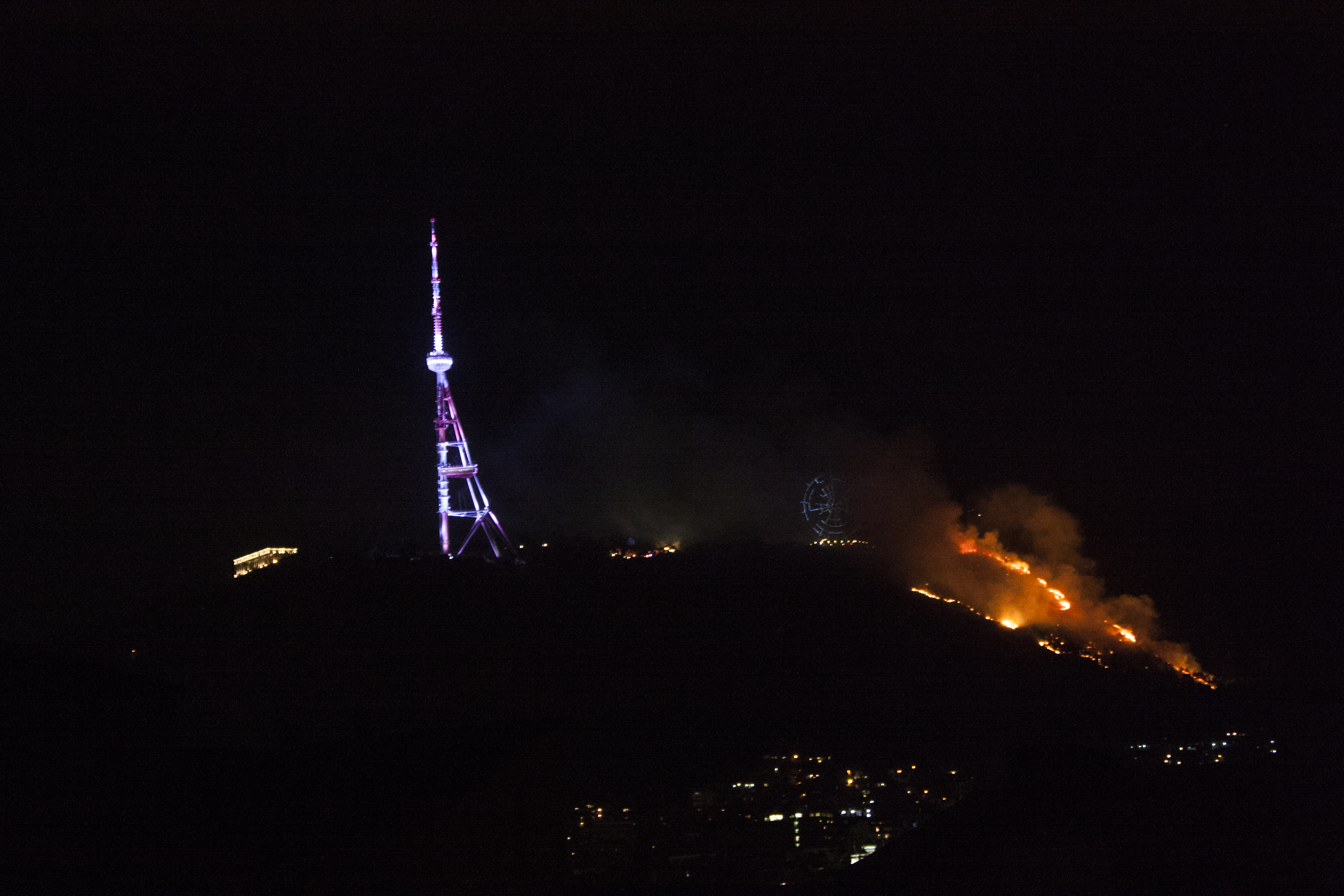
A fire at Mount Mtatsminda in Tbilisi on 8 August 2017. Wildfires rage in many parts of Georgia, especially the Borjomi Gorge, throughout August 2017.

- 3–11 September – The annual multinational military drills Agile Spirit 2017, involving service members from Georgia, the United States, Bulgaria, Latvia, Romania, Ukraine and Armenia, take place at the Orpalo firing range at Akhaltsikhe.
- 26 September – The Parliament of Georgia adopts the much-debated constitutional amendments with 117 voting in favor and two against. The vote is boycotted by two opposition parties, the United National Movement and the European Georgia. According to the new legislation, direct presidential elections are to be abolished and the country will transfer to fully proportional parliamentary representation in 2024. On October 9, President Margvelashvili vetoes the amendments and returns the draft bill to the Parliament with his objections, but the Parliament is able to override the veto and approves the initial version on 13 October.

=== October ===
- 16 October – The Sakhelmtsipo Universiteti ("State University"), the 23rd metro station is opened in Tbilisi.
- 17 October – Thousands of Georgians bid their farewell to 25 victims of the 1992–93 war in Abkhazia, including the Security Service colonel Mamia Alasania and the Sukhumi Mayor Guram Gabiskiria, whose bodies were uncovered in Abkhazia, positively identified, and transferred to Tbilisi as part of the efforts launched under the auspices of the International Committee of the Red Cross in 2010.
- 21 October – Elections of the bodies of local government in Georgia, the 6th in the country's post-Soviet history. At the same time, a new law, adopted in 2014, enters into force, envisaging direct elections of mayors for a four-year term. According to preliminary results, the ruling Georgian Dream – Democratic Georgia wins in all 73 electoral districts. An opposition mayoral candidate is ruled to be the winner in the Tianeti Municipality after a court appeal.
- 30 October – The President of Azerbaijan Ilham Aliyev hosts the inauguration ceremony of the new Baku–Tbilisi–Kars railway in Alyat attended by the Georgian Prime Minister Giorgi Kvirikashvili and Turkish President Recep Tayyip Erdogan.

=== November ===
- 13 November – Georgian Prime Minister Giorgi Kvirikashvili appoints four new ministers as part of announced structural and staff changes in the cabinet.
- 16 November – Georgian Defense Minister Levan Izoria announces the Georgia Defense Readiness Program (GDRP), a large U.S.-funded training program, is set to be launched in 2018.
- 20 November – The United States State Department approves sale of FGM-148 Javelin anti-tank missile systems to Georgia.
- 21–22 November – 2017 Isani flat siege: Three gunmen and a Georgian special forces soldier are killed in a 20-hour-long siege on an apartment in Tbilisi's Isani district. Officials state the militants are connected to "international terrorism", but abstain to reveal their identities for the time being. The officials later confirm Akhmed Chatayev, a Chechen Islamic State leader, was among the dead.
- 23 November – Catholicos-Patriarch of All Georgia Ilia II, the head of the Georgian Orthodox Church, unexpectedly names Metropolitan Shio Mujiri of the Eparchy of Senaki and Chkhorotsku as the Patriarchal locum tenens amid ongoing internal disagreements in the Church hierarchy.
- 23 November – Israeli archaeologists report the discovery of a four-line Greek inscription at Ashdod-Yam, suggesting a Georgian origin on account of its dating to "the 3rd indiction, year 292", which corresponds to AD 539 according to a medieval Christian Georgian calendar.
- 24–25 November – 2017 Batumi hotel fire: Eleven people, including 10 Georgian and one Iranian nationals, are killed and 21 are injured in an overnight fire in Batumi's five-star Leogrand hotel.
- 26 November - 2017 Junior Eurovision Song Contest: After winning the competition the year before, they decided to host the Junior Eurovision Song Contest in Tbilisi in 2017. Russia won that year with “Wings” by Polina. It was Georgia’s 1st year hosting the show.

=== December ===
- 1 December – Two teenage boys are stabbed to death in a school scuffle incident in downtown Tbilisi, involving more than a dozen of schoolboys. Two 16-year-old suspects are arrested on charges of homicide, leading to a public outcry and heated debates about safety in schools.
- 8 December – Mikheil Saakashvili, former President of Georgia and current leader of a Ukrainian opposition party, is briefly arrested by the Ukrainian police on charges of being connected to "criminal groups".
- 26 December – Georgian security forces conduct double operation in Tbilisi and the Pankisi Gorge, detaining five people allegedly linked to Akhmet Chatayev's group. A 19-year old local from the Pankisi Gorge is fatally wounded, sparking protests from locals. The officials reveal Chatayev's band planned terrorist attacks against diplomatic missions in Georgia and Turkey.

=== Unknown ===
- A ban on foreigners owning farmland was introduced in the Georgia's new constitution. The new constitution states that, with a small number of exceptions, agricultural land can only be owned by the state, a Georgian citizen or a Georgian-owned entity.

== Deaths ==
- 8 January – Anaida Bostanjyan, a Georgian-Armenian poet and translator (born 1949).
- 21 January – Jamshid Giunashvili, a Georgian Iranologist and former ambassador to Iran, 1994–2004 (born 1931).
- 28 January – Amberki Tabidze, a Georgian handballer (born 1952).
- 15 March – Geno Kalandia, a Georgian poet and politician (born 1939).
- 19 March – Gia Chirakadze, a Georgian singer (Kartuli Khmebi) and television presenter (born 1937).
- 10 April – Givi Berikashvili, a Georgian actor (born 1933).
- 12 April – Temur Zhorzholiani, a Georgian politician and chairman of the Conservative-Monarchist Party (born 1950).
- 13 April – Vakhtang Rcheulishvili, a Georgian businessman and politician (born 1954).
- 14 April – Zhaneta Archvadze, a Georgian television presenter (born 1931).
- 7 June – Koka Tskitishvili, a Georgian blues-rock guitarist (Koka & T. Blues Mob).
- 7 June – Sergo Kutivadze, a Georgian footballer and coach (born 1944).
- 25 July – Apolon Silagadze, a Georgian Orientalist and former ambassador to Egypt, Syria, Lebanon, and Jordan, 1998–2004 (born 1942).
- 31 July – Alexander Javakhishvili, retired navy admiral (born 1932).
- 14 August – Roman Gventsadze, retired police general, Minister of Internal Affairs (1992), member of Parliament (1999–2004) (born 1945).
- 16 August – Valeri Chkheidze, retired security service general (born 1948).
- 11 September – Ramaz Kharshiladze, a Georgian and Soviet judoka (born 1951).
- 18 September – Zurab Sotkilava, a Georgian opera singer (born 1937).
- 23 September – Tsisana Tatishvili, a Georgian opera singer (born 1937).
- 7 October – Pridon Todua, a Georgian radiologist and healthcare executive (born 1944).
- 11 October – Lika Kavzharadze, a Georgian actress (born 1959).
- 18 October – Giorgi Ochiauri, a Georgian sculptor, member of the Parliament of Georgia (2012–2016) (born 1927).
- 28 October – Teimuraz Koridze, a Georgian literary scholar and politician (born 1954).
- 6 November – Jansug Charkviani, a Georgian poet (born 1931).
- 9 December – Dimitri Jaiani, a Georgian actor, MP (1999–2004), Minister of Culture in Abkhazia's government-in-exile (since 2013) (born 1950).
- 25 December – Konstantine Zaldastanishvili, Georgian diplomat, incumbent Ambassador to Austria (since 2013) (born 1960).
- 31 December – Vaja Gigashvili, Georgian writer (born 1936).
