= Otar Chkhartishvili =

Georgian naval officer

Otar Chkhartishvili (Georgian: ოთარ ჩხარტიშვილი, Russian: Отар Чхартишвили; born 1950) is a retired Georgian naval officer who served, successively, in the Soviet, Russian, and Georgian navies. His last appointment was as the commander of the Georgian navy from 1997 to 1998.

Chkhartishvili, Captain 1st Rank, had a background with a 25-years service in the Soviet and Russian navies and had been a deputy chief of staff of a guided missile cruiser division in the Russian Northern Fleet by March 1997, when he was recruited by the government of Georgia and appointed to succeed Rear-Admiral Alexander Javakhishvili as the commander of the Georgian navy. In May 1998, the newly appointed Defense Minister David Tevzadze dismissed Chkhartishvili, accusing him of "financial irregularities" and "logistical incompetence". In June 1998, he was arrested and brought to trial on charges of abuse of office and embezzlement. In December 2000, he was acquitted as the court found him not guilty of misappropriating 50,000 GEL (US$27,000) through an illegal arms deal involving the importation of patrol boats from Ukraine.

Military offices
Preceded by Alexander Javakhishvili	Commander of the Georgian Navy; 1997–1998	Succeeded by Zurab Iremadze
