= Matka-class missile boat =

Class of Soviet hydrofoil missile boats

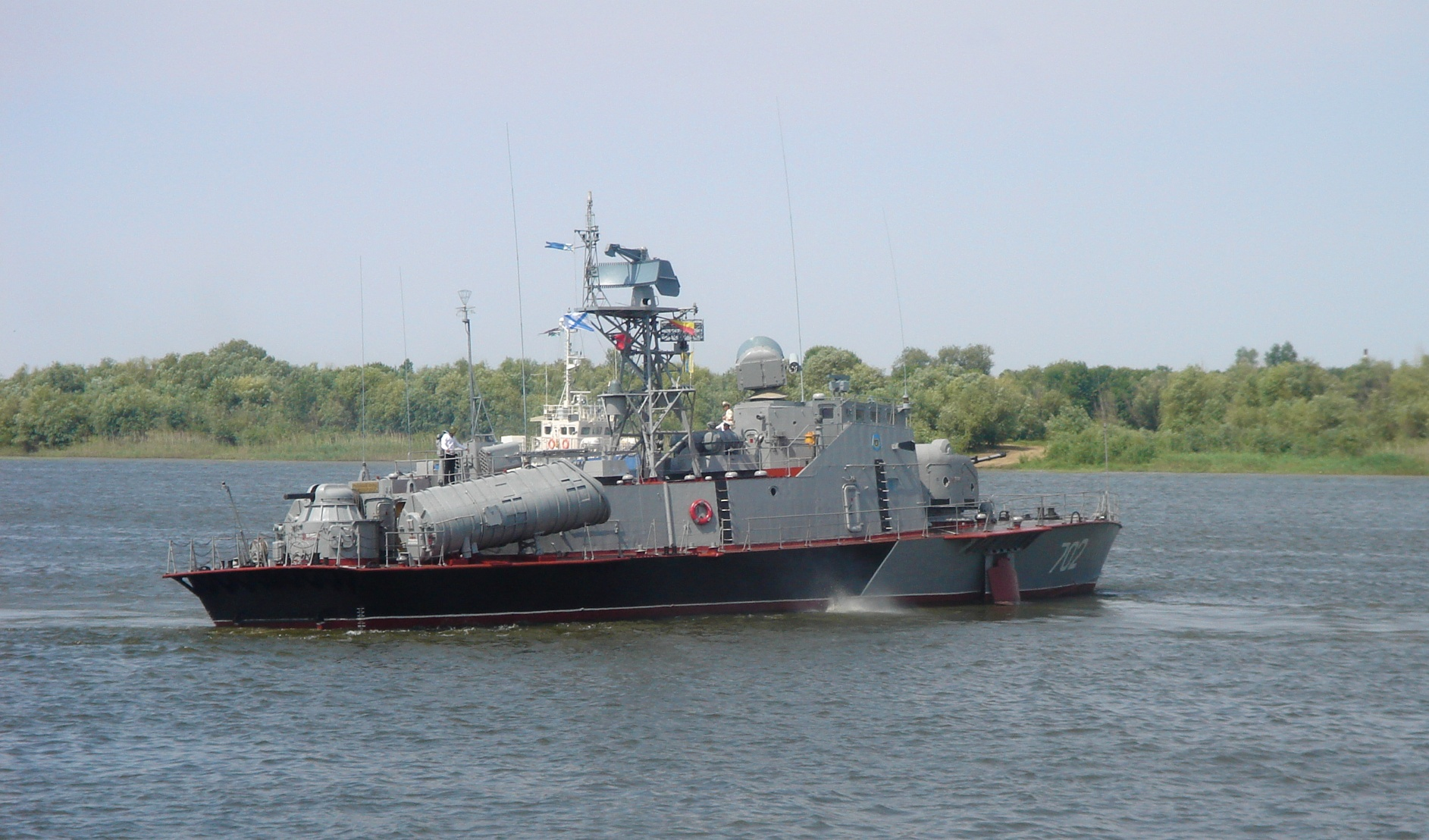
- Caspian MRK 702

Class overview
- Name: Matka class (Project 206MR Vikhr)
- Operators: Soviet Navy; Russian Navy; Ukrainian Navy; Border Police of Georgia
- Preceded by: Osa-class missile boat
- In service: 1977–present
- Completed: 12
- Active: 1
- Lost: 1
- Retired: 10
- Preserved: 1

General characteristics
- Type: Hydrofoil missile boat
- Displacement: 233 tons standard; 257 tons full load
- Length: 38.6 m (126 ft 8 in)
- Beam: 7.6 m (24 ft 11 in)
- Draught: 3.26 m (10 ft 8 in)
- Propulsion: 3 × M503 B2 Diesels; 15,000 hp (11,000 kW) or Zvezda M504
- Speed: 42 knots (78 km/h; 48 mph)
- Range: 600 nautical miles (1,100 km; 690 mi) at 37 knots (69 km/h; 43 mph); 1,450 nautical miles (2,690 km; 1,670 mi) at 14 knots (26 km/h; 16 mph)
- Endurance: 5 days
- Complement: 30
- Sensors & processing systems: MR-101 radar(from P-260 onwards); Omega navigation radar(not on P-15)
- Electronic warfare & decoys: Pchlea EW radar(on P 262); Decoy launchers
- Armament: 1 × AK-176 gun; 1 × AK-630 gun; 2 P-15 Termit anti ship missiles (replaced by 8 SS-N-25 in Russian Navy units)

The Matka class is the NATO reporting name for a group of hydrofoil missile boats built for the Soviet Navy (Baltic Fleet and Black Sea Fleet). The Soviet designation was Project 206MR Vikhr. Following the 1997 Black Sea Fleet partition treaty all Black Sea Fleet Matka class boats were passed to the Ukrainian Navy.

== Design ==
These boats are the descendants of the Osa-class missile boat and are a heavily modified version of the Turya-class torpedo boat. There is only a single foil, the aft part of the hull hydroplanes at high speeds. They are air-conditioned and NBC-sealed. The SS-N-2 launchers are the same type as carried on the Project 61MR ("Mod-Kashin")-class destroyers. Despite initial reports that they were good seaboats, later information revealed that the Soviets regarded them as cramped inside and top-heavy. Of thirteen planned ships, one was cancelled and another started but never completed. All were built in Leningrad.

After the breakup of the USSR, Russia discarded many and five went to Ukraine, one of which was later transferred to Georgia after a complete refurbishment.

== Project 206.6 ==
R-44 serves as a developmental ship for the Black Sea Fleet, and was the first vessel anywhere to carry the Kh-35 missile, in two quad-canisters. These were removed in 2000 but re-installed in 2003. In 1998, the SP-521 combat data system was installed. R-44 also has the AK-630М1-2 Roy CIWS which is two 30 mm gatling guns superimposed on each other, in place of the AK-630. More recently, the ship has been seen with no "Drum Tilt" radar and a large deckhouse between the bridge and mast.

== Combat usage ==
On August 10, 2008 during the Russo-Georgian War a special forces team from the 45th Guards Spetsnaz Brigade of the Russian Airborne Forces (VDV) launched a raid on the port of Poti. Most of the Georgian fleet was anchored in port, but unmanned due their crews expecting further air attacks (a day earlier the Russians launched two Tochka-U missiles, killing five sailors), allowing the VDV commandos to board, mine and sink several Georgian Navy and Coast Guard vessels, including the Tbilisi.

== Trivia ==
In Russian, the word "matka" (NATO given name) means literally mother. The word has also meaning "queen" (of insect hive), which is the most likely connotation, since previous missile boat classes were named Osa and Komar, meaning "wasp" and "mosquito".

== Ships ==
A total of 12 boats were built for the Soviet Navy. A gun boat version without hydrofoils was offered for export.

- Ukrainian Navy - 1 boat The Pryluky in service (2017)
- Border Police of Georgia - 1 boat The Tbilisi (თბილისი) transferred from Ukraine, sunk by the Russian Airborne troops in Poti port during the 2008 South Ossetia war

Name	Hull No.	Commissioned	Service	Decommissioned	Status
«Р-27»	241	31 December 1977	Blt, Csp	10 April 2002	Scrapped
«Р-44»	242	30 September 1978	Blt, BSe	5 October 2008	Since 2001 - Corsar («Корсар»). In 1984-85 modernised by project 2066; Scrapped
«Р-50»	243	30 December 1978	Blt, Csp	2014	Since 15 August 2004 - Karachaevo-Cherkesia («Карачаево-Черкесия»); Decommissioned. Opened 29 August 2015 as museum Pokrovskiy storozhevoy («Покровский сторожевой») in the city of Engels, Saratov Oblast
«Р-221»	244	30 December 1978	Blt	16 March 1998	Scrapped
«Р-254»	245	10 January 1979	Blt	5 July 1994	Scrapped
«Р-260»	246	21 December 1979	BSe, Ukraine	30 November 2004	Since 10 January 1996 - Uman («Умань»); Scrapped
«Р-262»	247	12 December 1980	BSe, Ukraine		Since 10 January 1996 - Pryluky («Прилуки»); When part of Ukrainian Navy in December 2018 the anti-ship missile launch system «Termit» was removed. In plans to have Neptune missile system installed
«Р-265»	248	15 November 1980	BSe, Ukraine	7 November 2012	Since 10 January 1996 - Kakhovka («Каховка»). Scrapped
«Р-251»	249	15 June 1981	BSe, Ukraine	30 June 2001	Since 10 January 1996 - Tsyurupinsk («Цюрупінськ»); Scrapped
«Р-15»	250	29 October 1981	BSe, Ukraine, Georgia	13 August 2008	Since 10 January 1996 - Konotop («Конотоп»), since 30 June 1999 - Tbilisi («Тбилиси»); Sunk by the Russian AF in the city of Poti during the 2008 war. Scrapped
«Р-25»	251	28 February 1983	Blt, Csp	2014	Since 30 May 2003 - Borovsk («Боровск»); Decommissioned. In summer of 2017 scrapped at the Dagdisel factory in Kaspiysk
«Р-30»	252	30 December 1983	Blt, Csp	2014	Since 13 May 2005 - Budyonnovsk («Будённовск»); Decommissioned. In summer of 2017 scrapped at the Dagdisel factory in Kaspiysk

Green — Preserved as a museum
Yellow — active in Ukrainian Navy
Red — decommissioned
Black — sunk

== See also ==
- List of ships of the Soviet Navy
- List of ships of Russia by project number
- HMCS Bras d'Or (FHE 400), a Canadian hydrofoil intended for anti-submarine duties
- HMS Speedy (P296), a Royal Navy jetfoil mine countermeasure vessel.
- Pegasus-class hydrofoil, a class of USN PHM
- Sarancha-class missile boat, a class of Soviet PHM
- Sparviero-class patrol boat, a class of Italian PHM
