= Gocha Vetriakov =

Gocha Vetriakov (Georgian: გოჩა ვეტრიაკოვი; Russian: Гоча Ветряков, Gocha Vetryakov) is a former Georgian naval officer who commanded the Georgian Navy from 2005 to 2006.

A native of Tbilisi and of Georgian ethnic descent, Gocha Vetriakov graduated from the Vladivostok maritime college in Russia and then joined the ranks of the Coast Guard of Georgia. He then held various positions in intelligence and defense structures of Georgia in the administrations of Eduard Shevardnadze and Mikheil Saakashvili. From 2005 to 2006, Vetriakov, then Captain 3rd Rank, was the commander of the Georgian Navy. He resigned from his office in April 2006 and left Georgia for the United States in May 2007, alleging pressure from the then-Defense Minister Irakli Okruashvili. He then majored in security and global studies at the American Military University. In December 2012, the newly elected Parliament of Georgia granted him the status of a political exile. Currently, Gocha Vetriakov runs a private company (www.eto-ibs.com) and is also writing a series of science fiction books.

Military offices
| Preceded by Levan Bakradze | Commander of the Georgian Navy; 2005–2006 | Succeeded by Koba Gurtskaia |
