= Zurab Iremadze =

Georgian military commander (1960–2004)

Zurab "Gigla" Iremadze (Georgian: ზურაბ [გიგლა] ირემაძე; 1960 – 13 August 2004) was a Georgian military commander who was involved in the Georgian Civil War in the early 1990s and then commanded the Georgian Navy from 1998 to 2004. He had the ranks of major general and vice admiral.

Iremadze's career unfolded against the backdrop of the civil unrest in Georgia. He was one of the first officers of the National Guard, established in Georgia, then part of the crumbling Soviet Union, in 1990. Iremadze remained loyal to President of Georgia Zviad Gamsakhurdia after the latter was ousted in the 1991–1992 military coup and served him as a high-ranking commander in an attempted comeback in 1993. After Gamsakhurdia's final defeat and death in December 1993, Iremadze hid out in the forests of western Georgia and reconciled with the government of Eduard Shevardnadze in 1997. He was accepted in the army and made a commander of the Telavi-based airborne battalion in 1997. In 1998, the newly appointed Defense Minister David Tevzadze put Iremadze in command of the Georgian navy, which he headed for nearly six years until his death of a heart attack during the international BLACKSEAFOR exercises in Poti in August 2004.

Military offices
Preceded by Otar Chkhartishvili	Commander of the Georgian Navy; 1998–2004	Succeeded by Zaza Erkvania
