= Iremadze =

Iremadze (Georgian: ირემაძე) is a Georgian surname. Notable people with the surname include:

- Vanger Gabriel Iremadze (1940-2024), a Georgian Civil Engineer, Born in Tsageri, Lechkumi Region, Georgia
- Tengiz Iremadze (born 1973), Georgian philosopher
- Zurab Iremadze (1960–2004), Georgian military commander
