= List of defence companies of Turkey =

List of Turkish defense industry companies refers to a list of companies active in Turkey and contributing to defense production of Turkey. They are generally headquartered in Turkey, with some maintaining offices abroad. Most are based in Ankara and Istanbul, although there are companies headquartered in other provinces as well.

While the majority are funded by domestic capital, certain companies have shares controlled by foreign investors. Among the shareholders are the Turkish Armed Forces Foundation (TSKGV), various Turkish ministries, companies affiliated with TSKGV such as ASELSAN and HAVELSAN, foreign entities like General Electric, and domestic private firms like Zorlu Holding. Some of these companies are partially publicly traded, and a portion operate under the umbrella of the Scientific and Technological Research Council of Turkey (TÜBİTAK).

The companies operate in diverse fields. Some, like TUSAŞ (TAI) and Baykar, specialize in aviation; others, such as Otokar and BMC, focus on land platforms; companies like CTech are active in information technologies; and firms like DEARSAN operate in the maritime sector.

== List ==
Aircraft technologies
Logo	Name	Abbreviation	Established	Headquarters	Owner	Subsidiaries	Image	Official website
	Alp Aviation	ALP	1998	Eskişehir				www.alp.com.tr
	Baykar Technologies	BAYKAR	1984	Istanbul		Piaggio Aerospace		baykartech.com
	Kaskaş Kalıpçılık	KASKAŞ	1987	İstanbul				kaskas.com.tr
	Kale Aero		2008	İstanbul	Kale Group			kaleaero.com
	Turkish Aerospace Industries	TUSAŞ or TAI	1973	Ankara	Ministry of Industry and Technology			tusas.com.tr
	Turkish Technic		2006	İstanbul	Turkish Airlines			turkishtechnic.com/tr
	Tusaş Engine Industries	TEI	1985	Eskişehir	TUSAŞ (%50,5); GE (%46,2); TSKGV & THK (%3,3)	Gür Metal		tei.com.tr
	Asisguard Defence		2019	İstanbul				asisguard.com.tr
	TÜBİTAK Space Technologies Research Institute	TÜBİTAK-UZAY	2001	Ankara	TÜBİTAK			uzay.tubitak.gov.tr
	Lentatek (Note: formerly Vestel Savunma)		2003	Ankara	Zorlu Holding			lentatek.com

Energy and battery systems
Logo	Name	Abbreviation	Established	Headquarters	Owner	Subsidiaries	Image	Official website
	ASPİLSAN		1981, Kayseri	Ankara/İstanbul	TSKGV (%98,32)			aspilsan.com
	İŞBİR Elektrik	İŞBİR	1977	Balıkesir	TSKGV			www.isbirelektrik.com.tr
	Genpower		1999	Ankara				genpower.com.tr

Electronics and software
Logo	Name	Abbreviation	Established	Headquarters	Owner	Subsidiaries	Image	Official website
	ASELSAN Elektronik Sanayi	ASELSAN	1975	Ankara	TSKGV (%74,2); Public (%25,8)	EHSİM		aselsan.com.tr
	Asisguard Savunma		2019	İstanbul				asisguard.com.tr
	Arke Telekom	Arketel	2014	Ankara				arketel.com
	Profen (Note: an abbreviation of the term "Professional engineering")		1995	İstanbul				profen.com.tr
	Aydın Software and Electronics	AYESAŞ	1990	Ankara				ayesas.com
	Altay		1957	Ankara				altay.com.tr
	EHSİM Elektronic Warfare Systems	EHSİM	1998	Ankara	ASELSAN (%50) HAVELSAN (%49); SSTEK (%1)			ehsim.com.tr
	Electra IC		2014	İstanbul				electraic.com
	MaM High Tech		2018	Kayseri & London				mamhightech.com
	Tualcom Electronics	TUALCOM	2013	Ankara				tualcom.com
	Meteksan		2006	Ankara	Bilkent Holding			meteksan.com
	Elektronik Sistemler Destek Sanayi ve Ticaret A.Ş.	ESDAŞ	1991	Ankara	HAVELSAN SERCO GmbH			
	HAVELSAN Teknoloji Radar	HTR	1990	Ankara	HAVELSAN			htr.com.tr
	NETAŞ		1967	İstanbul	ZTE Cooperatif U.A. (%48,5) TSKGV (%15) Public (%36,95)	BDH Bilişim		netas.com.tr
	Savronik		1986	Ankara				savronik.com.tr
	SDT Space & Defence Technologies	SDT	2005	Ankara		CEY Defence and Simulation Systems Sirius Design Laboratory		sdt.com.tr
	TÜBİTAK Bilişim ve Bilgi Güvenliği İleri Teknolojiler Araştırma Merkezi	TÜBİTAK BİLGEM	1968	Ankara	TÜBİTAK			bilgem.tubitak.gov.tr
	YALTES Electronics and Information Systems	YALTES	2002	İstanbul				yaltes.com

Information technologies
Logo	Name	Abbreviation	Established	Headquarters	Owner	Subsidiaries	Image	Official website
	BİTES		2005	Ankara	ASELSAN			bites.com.tr
	CTech		2005	İstanbul	TUSAŞ			ctech.com.tr
	Hava Elektronik Sanayii	HAVELSAN	1982	Ankara	TSKGV (%98,4875)			havelsan.com.tr
	KoçSistem		1945	İstanbul	Koç Holding			kocsistem.com.tr
	KaTron (Note: formerly KALETRON)		1996 2009 (as KaTron)	Ankara	Koç Holding			katron.com.tr/turkce
	MilSOFT		1998	Ankara				milsoft.com.tr
	Onur Yüksek Teknoloji	OYT	1980	Ankara				onur.net
	Savunma Teknolojileri Mühendislik ve Ticaret A.Ş.	STM	1991	Ankara				stm.com.tr

Ground platforms
Logo	Name	Abbreviation	Established	Headquarters	Owner	Subsidiaries	Image	Official website
	ASMAŞ Ağır Sanayi A.Ş.	ASMAŞ	1978	İzmir				asmas.com
	BMC Otomotiv	BMC	1964	İzmir	TMSF			bmc.com.tr
	FNSS Defence Systems	FNSS	1985	Ankara	Nurol Holding			fnss.com.tr
	Hema Industry	HEMA	1973	Tekirdağ				hemaendustri.com
	Koluman		1965	Ankara				koluman.com.tr
	Nurol Holding		1966	Ankara		FNSS		nurol.com.tr
	Otokar		1963	Sakarya	Koç Holding			otokar.com.tr
	ŞINLAK Holding		1951	İstanbul		UZEL-ŞINLAK Defence		sinlak.com

Naval technology and shipyards
Logo	Name	Abbreviation	Established	Headquarters	Owner	Subsidiaries	Image	Official website
	Anadolu Shipyard	ADİK	1982	Tuzla	Furtrans Denizcilik			anadolushipyard.com
	DEARSAN		1980	Tuzla				dearsan.com
	Gölcük Naval Shipyard		1926	Gölcük	Ministry of National Defense			
	Istanbul Naval Shipyard (Note: formerly Pendik Shipyard)		1982	Tuzla				istanbulshipyard.com
	RMK Marine	RMK	1997	Tuzla	Koç Holding			rmkmarine.com.tr
	SEDEF Shipyard (Note: Turkish: SEDEF Tersanesi)	SEDEF	1972	Tuzla & Orhanlı	Turkon Holding			sedefshipyard.com
	Yonca-Onuk Shipyard		1986	Tuzla				yoncashipyard.com
	Yıldız Gemi			Tuzla				yildizgemi.com.tr

Rocket ammunition
Logo	Name	Abbreviation	Established	Headquarters	Owner	Subsidiaries	Image	Official website
	BARIŞ		1979	Ankara				bariselektrik.com.tr
	Girsan (Note: The company uses Yavuz brand for Turkey, and Girsan for other companies.)		1994	Giresun				girsan.com
	Mechanical and Chemical Industry Corporation	MKE	1950	Ankara	Ministry of National Defense			mke.gov.tr
	ROKETSAN		1988	Ankara	TSKGV (%55,34) MKE (%15,17); ASELSAN (%14,90); VakıfBank (%9,93); HAVELSAN (%4,5); STM (%0,15); İşbir (%0,01)			roketsan.com.tr
	Sarsılmaz		1880	Düzce				sarsilmaz.com
	Trabzon Silah Sanayi	TİSAŞ	1993	Trabzon				tisas.com.tr
	TÜBİTAK Defense Industries Research and Development Institute	TÜBİTAK-SAGE	1972	Ankara	TÜBİTAK			sage.tubitak.gov.tr
