= AB32 =

AB32 or variants may refer to:

- AB postcode area, the Aberdeen postcode area
- Global Warming Solutions Act of 2006, a California law known as Assembly Bill 32 (AB 32)
- A Turkish patrol ship of the Türk class
