= Koba Gurtskaia =

Georgian military officer (born 1966)

Koba Gurtskaia (or Ghurtskaia, Georgian: კობა ღურწკაია; born 12 December 1973) is a Georgian CEO. He was acting commander of the Georgian Navy from 2006 to 2008.

A native of Sukhumi, Gurtskaia graduated from the Georgian Institute of Subtropics (1992) and the Ukrainian Armed Forces Staff Academy (2000). Gurtskaia joined the Georgian military in 1992 and fought in the War in Abkhazia (1992–1993). From 1998 to 2006, he served, successively, as the commander of a separate Marine battalion, Chief of Staff of a Marine brigade, Chief of Staff of the Navy and Executive Officer for Coastal Defense. From 2006 to 2008, Colonel Gurtskaia was an acting commander of the Georgian Navy. On 5 March 2008, he was moved to the position of Deputy Head of the National Guard Department of Georgia. In 2016, he headed maritime security department at the Defense Ministry.

Military offices
Preceded by Gocha Vetriakov	Commander of the Georgian Navy; 2005–2008	Succeeded by Besik Shengelia
