= Coast Guard of Georgia =

Maritime arm of the Georgian Border Police

Georgian Coast Guard საქართველოს სანაპირო დაცვა
- Ceremonial ensign of the Coast Guard of Georgia

- Racing stripe

- Battle ensign

Agency overview
- Formed: July 16, 1998; 28 years ago
- Preceding agency: Georgian Navy

Jurisdictional structure
- Operations jurisdiction: Georgia (country)
- Specialist jurisdiction: Coastal patrol, marine border protection, marine search and rescue

Operational structure
- Headquarters: Batumi naval base
- Agency executive: Captain Ramaz Papidze, Commander of Georgian Coast Guard
- Parent agency: Border Police of Georgia

Facilities
- Vessels: 44 vessels in total

Website
- bpg.gov.ge/en/page/border-police/coast-guards

The Georgian Coast Guard (Georgian: საქართველოს სანაპირო დაცვა) is the maritime arm of the Georgian Border Police, within the Ministry of Internal Affairs of Georgia. It is responsible for the maritime protection of the entire 310 km (190 mi) Black Sea coastline of Georgia, as well as the Georgian territorial waters. The northern half of this coastaline is since the Russo-Georgian War under the control of Abkhazia, though. The primary missions of the service are administration of the territorial waters, marine pollution protection, maritime law enforcement, search and rescue, port security and maritime defence.

The former Georgian Navy (Georgian Naval Forces; Georgian: საქართველოს სამხედრო საზღვაო ძალები, sak’art’velos samkhedro-sazghvao dzalebi) was a branch of the Georgian Defense Ministry armed forces until 2009, when it was merged with the Coast Guard and transferred to the Ministry of Internal Affairs. Before the 2008 war, the Georgian Navy consisted of 19 vessels and 531 personnel of which 181 were officers, 200 NCOs, 114 conscripts and 36 civilians.

The headquarters and a principal Coast Guard base are located at the Black Sea port of Poti. A second smaller base is in Batumi, Adjaria. Besides the Poti-based force, the Coast Guard also includes a special counter-terrorist Detachment. Maritime surveillance radar stations are maintained at Anaklia, Poti, Supsa, Chakvi, and Gonio, providing coverage of all territorial seas.

As of 2021, the commander of the Georgian Coast Guard is Captain Ramaz Papidze.

== History ==
Despite Georgia's location at the Black Sea coast and historical association with maritime commerce, it has never actually possessed any sizable fleet. The first attempt to build a modern navy dates to the country's short-lived independence as the Democratic Republic of Georgia from 1918 to 1921. The Georgian Navy at that time consisted of a flagship, several sailing-boats, and a few tugs commandeered from Russian owners during the Russian Civil War. The 1921 Red Army invasion brought the nation-building to an end and Georgia became part of the Soviet Union. By 1990, Georgia's coastal waters had been controlled by the Poti-based 184th Coast Guard Brigade of the Soviet Black Sea Fleet. Smaller bases were located at Ochamchire, Batumi, Anaklia, and Sukhumi. After the dissolution of the Soviet Union, the Poti brigade was completely withdrawn from Georgia in 1992, having left behind only six vessels. However, the Russian border guards continued to patrol Georgia's coastline until 1998.

== Georgian Navy ==
Former Georgian naval ensign, used during the late 1990s and early 2000s.

The naval ensign of Georgia from 2004 to 2009.

In February 1990, the Cabinet of Ministers of Georgia decreed an ad hoc commission for the army-building problems. One of its groups, led by Captain Alexander Javakhishvili, the former commander of a Soviet nuclear submarine, was responsible for building up a navy. After the dissolution of the Soviet Union, Georgia, not a CIS member at that time, was not included in the initial Russian-Ukrainian Black Sea Fleet partition negotiations in January 1992. Thus, when the separatist war in Abkhazia broke out in 1992, Georgia was without an effective naval force and defense system. The only two significant naval operations during the war included the August 1992 evacuation of 173 women and children from Bichvinta (Pitsunda) and the April 1993 destruction of a pro-Abkhaz Chechen warlord Shamil Basayev's camp at Gudauta. July 7, 1993, the day when the Georgian minesweeper Gantiadi under Shukri Kopaliani, patrolling off Tamysh, won a victory over several Abkhaz boats was celebrated as the Day of the Georgian Navy.

The navy-building began with equipping fishing vessels by small caliber anti-aircraft guns and machine guns. In 1996, Georgia resumed its demands on its portion of the ex-Soviet Black Sea Fleet, and the Russian refusal to allot Georgia a portion of the ex-Soviet Navy became another bone of contention in the progressively deteriorating Georgian-Russian relations. This time, Ukraine endorsed Tbilisi’s claims, turning over several patrol boats to the Georgian Navy and starting to train Georgian crews, but was unable to include in the final fleet deal a transfer of the formerly Poti-based vessels to Georgia. Later, the rest of the Georgian share was decided to be ceded to Russia in return for diminution of debt.

Georgia is one of the founding members and a participant of the Black Sea Force (BLACKSEAFOR).

Later in the 1990s, Georgia, with the help of NATO member states, chiefly Turkey and Greece, managed to build up a small naval force. Yet throughout its existence the Georgian Navy remained, in many ways, the most inferior component of the armed forces without any clear operational doctrine and lacking resources necessary to maintain seaworthy ships or conduct training missions.

Following Georgia's 2008 conflict with Russia, in which Georgia had most of its naval forces destroyed, it was decided to merge the Georgian Navy with the Georgian Coast Guard the following year.

== Georgian Coast Guard ==
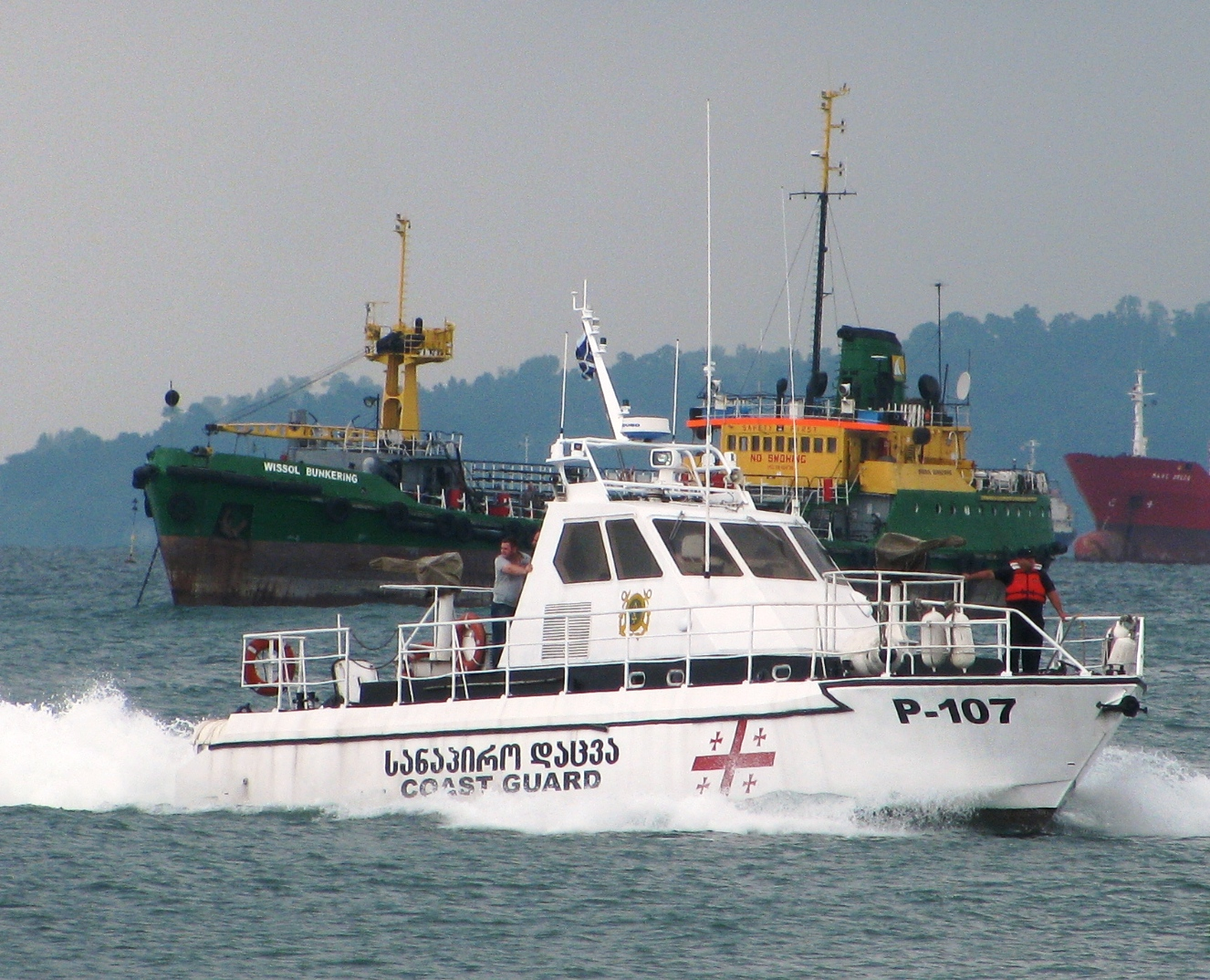
The Georgian Coast Guard boat P-107 off Batumi in 2010.

The formation of the Georgian Coast Guard started in 1998, when the first naval division was established within the State Border Defense State Department of Georgia (directly under the Office of the President). At the same time, the first and the second naval divisions were founded in Poti and Batumi. The command structure made these units a military element of the Border Guard, adjunct but without clear maritime experience.

On July 16, 1998, the 1st Naval Division of the State Border Defense State Department of Georgia started patrolling of the maritime state border of Georgia. The vessels had been donated by Ukraine and Turkey, in varying states of seaworthiness. Georgian Coast Guard Day is celebrated on July 16 of each year.

Immediate support for development of the Coast Guard came by way of the United States Georgia Border Security and Law Enforcement (GBSLE) Program, managed by the U.S. Customs Service with involvement of the U.S. Coast Guard. Georgian maritime personnel had begun to attend technical and officer training schools in the U.S. in 1997, an initiative that then expanded. The first infrastructure assistance project to be completed was the surveillance radar station at the terminus of the Supsa oil pipeline in 1999.

The United States Coast Guard deployed a Long Term Training Team to Georgia in 1998, based in Poti. Over the next five years the team offered training, mentoring and maintenance for the Georgian Coast Guard personnel and infrastructure. Two 40-foot SeaArks and two USCG Point-class cutters were transferred to Georgia. Arriving in 2000 and 2002, the ex-Point Countess and ex-Point Baker became the workhorses of the fleet. Renamed Tsotne Dadiani (P210) and General Mazniashvili (P211), the cutters created a technical bridge that served well until Georgia began to develop and acquire new vessels in 2007 and 2008. A second coastal radar was brought online in Poti in 2002. Overlapping Supsa coverage to the south, Georgia now could monitor territorial waters from Abkhazia region to Adjaria region.

Internally, the naval division remained ill funded, ill-defined and challenged by its organizational role as simply another Border Guard element. Due to the importance of the obligations to control the maritime border, and with increasing capabilities, a reform process was begun in 2002 to create equality and organizational efficiency for the Coast Guard.

Admiring the model of the United States, and supported by the GBSLE Maritime Advisor and Georgian colleagues, Georgian Captain Third Class Ramazi Papidze crafted a functional Coast Guard for Georgia. Implementing a plan based on the threats, missions, tactics and current/planned resources, Papidze developed a structure that was equal within the department to the Border Guard, and that divided responsibilities inside the Coast Guard between operational forces led by an Operations Directorate and Resources Management led by an Administration Directorate. The service would have a majority independent budget and autonomous responsibility for the conduct of its missions. Innovative and forward looking, the proposal included necessities of Georgian legislation, culture and tradition. Clearly a Georgian organizational model, in April 2003 the Main Office of the Coast Guard was established within the State Border Defense State Department of Georgia. This was the most major reform of a military element in Georgia to date, and set the Coast Guard on a path of professionalization and operational success.

Shortly after the announcement Major General Davit Gulua was named as the first Head of the Coast Guard, while continuing his duties as deputy chairman of the department.

In 2005, the State Border Defense Department of Georgia became a subordinate agency of the Ministry of Internal Affairs of Georgia with the significant increase of the status and functions of the Coast Guard.

In December 2006, the MIA State Border Defense Department was transformed into a law-enforcement agency – the Border Police of Georgia. Relevant changes were made in the Coast Guard as well; it now had the status of a department. The Head of the department became at the same time the Deputy Head of the Border Police of Georgia.

Rank group	General / flag officers				Senior officers			Junior officers
Georgian Coast Guard
Georgian Coast Guard	ადმირალი Admirali	ვიცე-ადმირალი Vitse-adimirali	კონტრადმირალი K’ont’radmirali	კონტრადმირალი (ქვედა ნახევარი); K’ont’radmirali (kveda nakhevari)	კაპიტანი პირველი წოდება K’ap’it’ani p’irveli ts’odeba	კაპიტანი მეორე წოდება K’ap’it’ani meore ts’odeba (Note: Currently highest active rank)	კაპიტანი მესამე წოდება K’ap’it’ani mesame ts’odeba	კაპიტანი ლეიტენანტი K’ap’it’ani leit’enant’i	პირველი ლეიტენანტი P’irveli leit’enant’i	ლეიტენანტი Leit’enant’i

== Georgian Coast Guard vessels ==
The Georgian Coast Guard and Georgian Navy fleet consisted of:

Class (type)	In service	Notes
Corvette
Grisha-class corvette	2	
Torpedo craft
Turya-class torpedo boat	1	
Muravey-class torpedo/patrol boat	3	
Missile craft
La Combattante IIa-class fast attack craft	1	Dioskuria (Georgia (country)) former: Anninos (Greece)
Matka-class missile boat	1	Tbilisi (Georgia (country)) former: Konotop (Ukraine)
Patrol Craft
Lindau-class minesweeper		
Stenka-class patrol boat	2	Batumi (Georgia (country)); Giorgi Toreli (Georgia (country))
Point-class cutter	2	General Mazniashvili (Georgia (country)); Tsotne Dadiani (Georgia (country))
Reliance class-cutter	2	
MRTP 34 fast attack/patrol boat	2	
Akneta-class patrol boat	1	
Dilos-class Patrol craft	2	
AB-25-class patrol craft	1	
Zhuk-class patrol boat	9	
Kaan 33-class patrol boat	1	
Island-class patrol boat	2	Ochamchire (Georgia (country)); Dioskuria (Georgia (country))
Minesweepers
Yevgenya-class minesweeper	4	
Amphibious Landing crafts
LCM	4	
LCU	2	
LCT	2	

Georgian Coast Guard bases

=== Poti ===
- Aeti (აეტი), formerly the German minesweeper Minden (M-1085). Was in maintenance status when war with Russian Federation began in August 2008. Vessel was scuttled by Russian Federation forces at the dock in Poti. Subsequently, refloated in September 2008. Returned to active duty as an at-the-dock training platform.
- Giorgi Toreli was a Soviet Turya class torpedo boat (Project 206M) that had been modified in private service in Ukraine during the 1990s before being given to Georgia, in 1999.
- Tsotne Dadiani (ex-USCGC Point Countess). Sortied from Poti prior to arrival of Russian forces in August 2008. Returned to homeport from Batumi in September 2008.
- P 205 (First hull converted from older Soviet Project 1400 Grif-class into new Orbi-class). Was in maintenance status when war with Russian Federation began August 2008. Vessel was scuttled by Russian forces at the dock in Poti. Subsequently, refloated September 2008.
- P 203 and P 204 (02 Older Soviet Project 1400 Grif-class). P 204 sortied from Poti prior to arrival of Russian forces in August 2008. Returned to homeport from Batumi in September 2008. P 203 was scuttled by Russian forces at the dock in Poti in August 2008. Subsequently, lifted. Not returned to service.
- P 201 40-foot SeaArk. Sortied from Poti prior to arrival of Russian forces in August 2008. Returned to homeport from Batumi in September 2008.

=== Batumi ===
- General Mazniashvili (P211) (ex-USCGC Point Baker)
- P 101 40-foot SeaArk
- P 103 and P 104 (02 Older Soviet Project 1400 Grif-class)

== Former Georgian Navy vessels ==
The Georgian Navy consisted of 19 ships and boats. Until 19 August 2008, when it was destroyed by Russian forces, the most powerful combat unit was the missile boat Dioskuria. The other surface combat vessel, the missile boat Tbilisi, was found on fire in the Georgian naval base of Poti. The Navy suffered extensive losses in the Russo-Georgian War.

At sea on 9 August 2008 one Georgian warship was reported to have been hit by gunfire and sunk by units of the Russian Black Sea Fleet off the Abkhazian coast when allegedly entered a Russia imposed "security zone" along with three other vessels.

Other units were set on fire or sunk by Russian forces at Poti naval pier on 13 August.

- Dioskuria (დიოსკურია) was a French-built Tiger-class fast attack craft (1972), obtained in 2004 from Greece, formerly the PG Ypoploiarchos Batsis (P 17) (originally HS Kalypso P54) built by Constructions Mécaniques de Normandie in Cherbourg (1972-2004). Built to be equipped with the four MM38 Exocet missile system, two Oerlikon 35 mm twin cannons and two 533 mm (21 in) torpedo-launchers, she was the most powerful combat craft in the Georgian Navy. She too was severely damaged in the 2008 South Ossetia war and sunk in Poti.
- Tbilisi (თბილისი) was a Soviet project 206MR missile boat, obtained in 1999 from Ukraine. It was built to be equipped with two Termit missile launchers, a 76 mm AK-176 dual purpose gun and a six-barreled 30 mm AK-630M Gatling gun. The ship was discovered on fire in the Georgian naval base of Poti on August 13, 2008.

Even prior to the 2008 conflict Georgia had no missiles for the two vessels (Dioskura and Tbilisi) that had missile tubes.

As of the beginning of 2009, both Tbilisi and Dioskuria remained submerged in the port of Poti. They are likely total losses.

Overall, it appears that Georgian naval losses during the 2008 war with Russia totalled Tbilisi, Dioskuria, and Tskaltubo, which were sunk in Poti. Coast Guard losses totalled the cutter Giorgi Toreli, which was allegedly sunk in the battle off the coast of Abkhazia, as well as P 203. However, Giorgi Toreli was still in service by 2014. Georgia's Coast Guard and Navy also had a number of small, rigid-hulled inflatable boats which were hauled off by Russian forces as war trophies. These hulls had served Coast Guard law enforcement missions and the Georgian Special Forces.

The loss of assets was likely one of the reasons the Navy was disbanded, and merged, into the Georgian Coast Guard.

== Coast Guard vessels ==
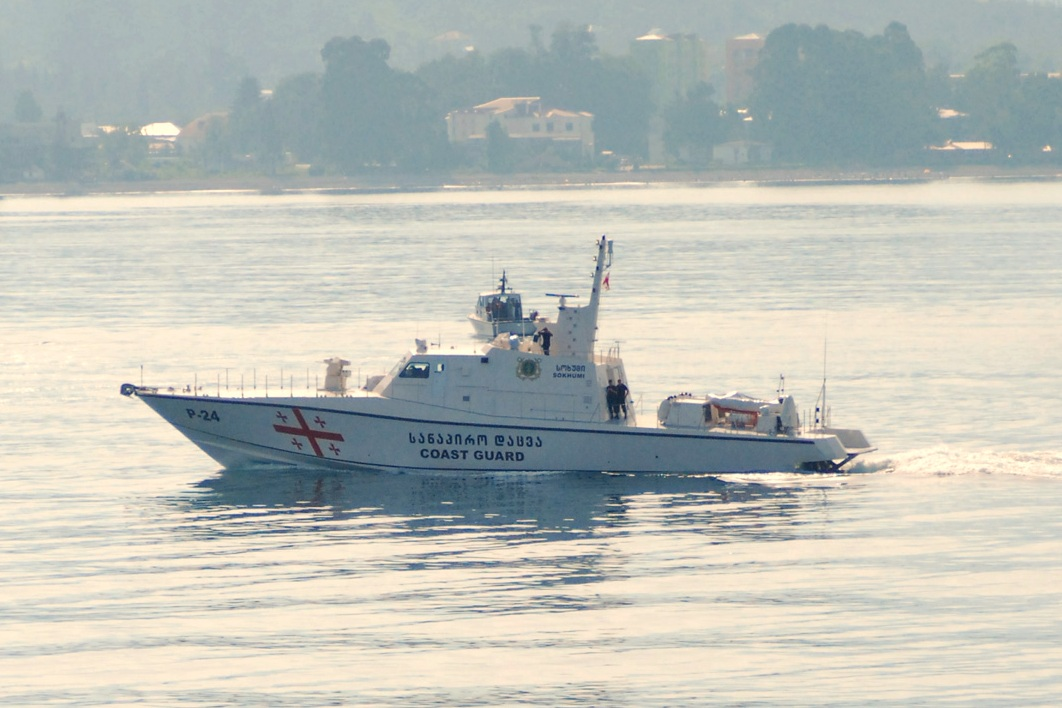
Georgian coast guard vessel Sokhumi (P-24)

Following the 2008 conflict with Russia, it appears that Georgia was able to recapitalize at least a portion of its fleet. The Coast Guard cutter Ayety (former German minesweeper Minden) and naval ship Tskaltubo, which had been scuttled in the port of Poti, were both raised. Judging by recent photographs, it appears that Ayety has been returned to active service as a training platform at the base in Poti. Tskaltubo, however, suffered much more extensive damage than Ayety, and her return to active service remains questionable. She is currently in dry dock.

The Coast Guard vessels which had sortied to Batumi in August 2008 were able to return and take up duties soon after Russian forces left Poti. These vessels remain in service in 2010. Additionally the Coast Guard vessels homeported in Batumi in 2008 remain active.

As a new acquisition, and contracted prior to August 2008, the Georgian Coast Guard has placed one Turkish built MRTP-33 patrol/fast attack boat, P-24 Sokhumi, into service. At least one more ship of this class is reportedly on order. These vessels are multi-mission capable so as to serve the diverse needs of the Coast Guard. The heaviest armament seen on these ships are 25-30mm cannon.

Georgia's Coast Guard also still has at least five of the smaller patrol boats armed with ZU-23-2 anti-aircraft guns that survived the conflict with Russia.

From 2016 to 2018 the United States gifted four of its Island-class patrol boats to Georgia.

== Coast Guard absorbs Navy in 2009 ==
In 2009 Georgia's remaining few operational naval units were consolidated with those of the Coast Guard of Georgia and placed under the Ministry for Internal Affairs of Georgia.

=== Alleged blockade of Abkhazia ===
During August 2009, the Georgian Coast Guard seized three commercial shipping vessels that were attempting to sail into Abkhazian waters. Abkhazian authorities have accused Georgia of maintaining a blockade of the break-away province in order to weaken and isolate it.

== Current Coast Guard weaponry and equipment ==
=== Ships and vessels ===
Type	Image	Origin	Role	Notes
Island-class patrol boat		United States	Cutter	2 ships gifted by the US. renamed Ochamchire and Dioskuria.
Point-class cutter		United States	Cutter	2 ships in service.
AB-25-class patrol craft		Turkey	Patrol vessel	1 ship in service, renamed Kutaisi.
Kaan 33-class patrol boat		Turkey	Patrol vessel	2 ships in service.
Dilos-class Patrol craft		Greece	Patrol vessel	2 ships in service, renamed Mestia and Iveria.
Zhuk-class patrol boat		Soviet Union; Ukraine	Patrol vessel	7 vessels in service, some armed with ZU-2-23.
Project 18639		Soviet Union; Ukraine	Patrol vessel	3 vessels in service

=== Weapons ===
Name	Image	Origin	Type	Notes
Mk 38 25 mm chain gun		United States	Chain gun	Used on Island-class
Bofors 40 mm gun		Sweden	Autocannon	Used on AB-25-class patrol craft
Oerlikon 20 mm		Switzerland	Autocannon	Used on AB-25-class patrol craft
ZU-23-2		Soviet Union	Anti-air Autocannon	Mounted on various ships.
DShK		Soviet Union	Heavy Machine Gun	Used on some vessels.
M2 Browning		United States	Heavy Machine Gun	Used on Island-class.
