= Besik Shengelia =

Besik "Beso" Shengelia (Georgian: ბესიკ [ბესო] შენგელია; 3 November 1967 – 28 February 2016) was a Georgian naval officer, Captain 1st Rank, who commanded the Georgian Navy in 2008.

Shengelia attended a naval college in Kiev, Ukraine, from 1984 to 1988. After four years of service in the Soviet Black Sea Fleet, Shengelia joined the military of a newly independent Georgia, rising to take command of a marine battalion in 1997. He commanded a separate naval division from 1998 to 2000 and a naval brigade from 2000 to 2001. He was the chief of staff of the Georgian navy from 2004 to 2005, commander of a naval squadron from 2006 to 2008 and commander of the Georgian navy in 2008. His tenure as a naval commander was marked by the August 2008 war with Russia, in the course of which the Georgian navy sustained heavy losses. After the war, in December 2008, the navy was reformed and merged with the Georgian Coast Guard under the auspices of the Ministry of Internal Affairs. On this occasion, Shengelia was appointed Director of the Coast Guard Department of the Border Police and remained on this position through 2012. He died in a traffic accident in Queens, New York City, in 2016.

Military offices
Preceded by Koba Gurtskaia	Commander of the Georgian Navy; 2008	Succeeded by Office abolished
Preceded by Office established	Director of the Coast Guard Department; 2008–2012	Succeeded by Lasha Kharabadze
