= Operation Black Sea Harmony =

Turkey-initiated naval operation

Black Sea Harmony is a naval operation initiated by Turkey in March 2004 in accordance with UN Security Council Resolutions 1373, 1540 and 1566 aimed at deterring terrorism and asymmetric threats in the Black Sea. It is similar to the NATO-led Operation Active Endeavour in the Mediterranean, and also aims at ensuring the security of the Turkish Straits.

Although it was originally a national operation, Black Sea Harmony has become multinational with the participation of other Black Sea littoral states. Turkey extended invitations to each littoral state to join Black Sea Harmony.

The operation originally was conducted in Turkey's territorial waters and in open waters in the Black Sea. In order to deter possible risks and threats in the maritime area, the Turkish Navy conducted periodic surveillance and reconnaissance operations across the whole of the Black Sea. Statistics concerning suspect ships were collected and shared with NATO and other littoral nations. In case of hailing of a suspect ship, voluntary boarding (depending on the captain's will) is conducted.

Permanent headquarters of Operation Black Sea Harmony is located in Eregli, on Turkey's Black Sea coast. Once the Operation became multinational, other littoral States were able to send Liaison Officers to Eregli.

In 2006 Russia officially joined the Black Sea Harmony initiative to address new security challenges in region. A protocol on information exchange regarding Ukraine's participation was signed in Ankara on 17 January 2007.

== See also ==
- Black Sea Naval Force
