= Shershen-class torpedo boat =

1960s Soviet torpedo boat class

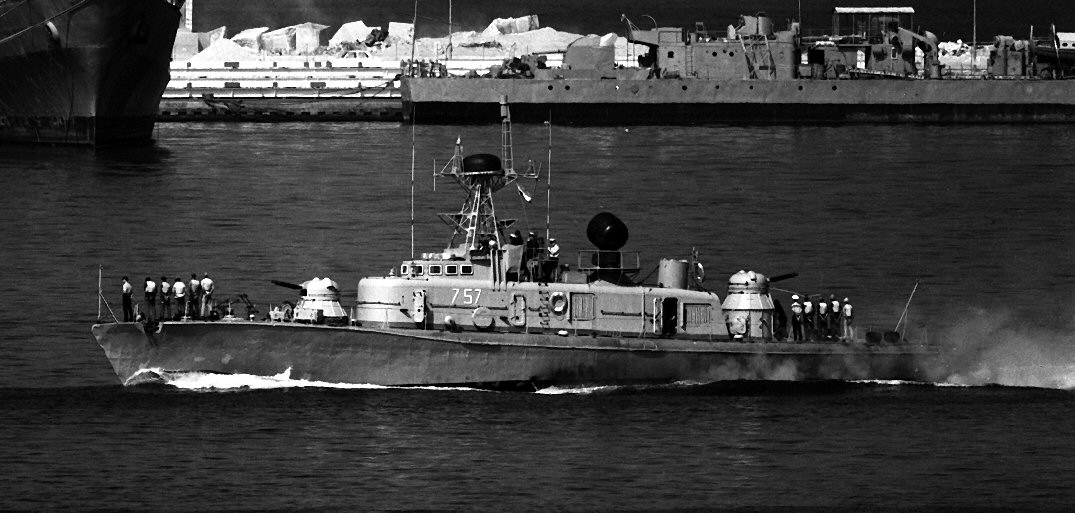
- Egyptian torpedo boat of the Soviet Project 206 class (Shershen class), with torpedo launchers removed.

Class overview
- Name: Project 206 Shtorm Torpedo Cutter
- Builders: Yaroslavl Shipyard; Sredne-Nevsky Shipyard; Sosnovskiy Shipyard, Sosnovka; Kraljevica Shipyard, Yugoslavia
- Operators: see below
- Succeeded by: Turya class
- Built: 1960–1970
- Completed: 123

General characteristics
- Type: Torpedo boat
- Displacement: 148 tons standard; 172 tons full load
- Length: 34.08 m (111 ft 10 in)
- Beam: 6.72 m (22 ft 1 in)
- Draught: 1.46–1.5 m (4 ft 9 in – 4 ft 11 in)
- Propulsion: Diesel-Direct: 3 × M503A diesels, 3 shafts, 3-bladed fixed-pitch props; 12,500 hp (9,300 kW)
- Speed: 45 knots (83 km/h; 52 mph)
- Range: 500 nmi (930 km; 580 mi) at 35 knots (65 km/h; 40 mph)
- Complement: 24
- Sensors & processing systems: Radar: MR-102 Baklan, MR-104 Rys', "High Pole"
- Armament: 2 × AK-230 30 mm (1.2 in)/65 naval guns; 1 × quad SA-N-5 MANPAD surface-to-air missiles; 4 × 533 mm (21 in) torpedo tubes (typically, Type 53-56 torpedo); 2 × DC racks (often deleted)

The Shershen class was the NATO reporting name for a class of torpedo boats built for the Soviet Navy and allies. The Soviet designation was Project 206 Shtorm (ru. Проект 206 «Шторм»).

== Development ==
Designated as TKAs (ru. торпедный катер (torpednyy kater); eng. torpedo cutter), the Project 183 boats were designed as simple fast attack craft suitable for cheap manufacture and easy maintenance. Intended as a successor to the Project 183 "Bolshevik" torpedo boats, development of the new class started in 1956. Like other similar boats, they were to be used near the coast, in good weather and under friendly air cover.

The first boat was completed at the Yaroslavl Shipyard and commissioned with the Soviet Navy in October 1960. Production was also organized at the Sredne-Nevskiy and Sosnovskiy Shipyard with a total of 80 boats being built at all three shipyards. A simplified export version was designated Project 206E (NATO designation Mol). Beside Soviet shipyards, Kraljevica Shipyard in SFR Yugoslavia licence built ten original Project 206 ships for the Yugoslav Navy.

== Description ==
Shershen-class boats measure 34.7 metres (114 ft) in length, with a 6.7 m (22 ft) beam and a draught of 1.46–1.5 m (4.8–4.9 ft). Standard displacement measures 129 tonnes (127 long tons) while full displacement varies from 161 to 170 tonnes (158 to 167 long tons), depending on source and ship configuration.

Propulsion is based on three M-503A diesel engines putting out 4,000 horsepower (3,000 kW) each, mounted on three shafts. Maximum achievable speed is 45 knots (83 km/h; 52 mph). With a sustainable speed of 42 knots (78 km/h; 48 mph) Shershens have a range of 460 nautical miles (850 km; 530 mi) and 850 nautical miles (1,570 km; 980 mi) if traveling at a cruising speed of 30 knots (56 km/h; 35 mph). Electricity is also provided by three 28 kW (38 hp) diesel generators. The boats have an autonomy of up to five days and can load 30 tonnes (30 long tons) of fuel. The crew is made of 20–21 personnel, including two officers.

Principal armament of the class consisted of four OTA-53-206M torpedo tubes located on the sides. The 533 millimetres (21 in) torpedoes were ejected by a powder charge and, depending on version, had a rudimentary homing ability or were straight run only. Surface search and targeting information for the torpedo attack was obtained by the MR-102 Baklan (NATO designation: "Pot Drum") radar with a search range of 18–20 nmi (33–37 km; 21–23 mi). Defensive armament is made of two AK-230 CIWS located on the bow and the stern, guided by the MR-104 Rys' (NATO designation: "Drum Tilt") radar with a maximum tracking range of 12.31 nmi (22.80 km; 14.17 mi). Secondary armament that could be carried included twelve BB-1 depth charges or six naval mines.

== Operators ==
=== Project 206 ===
- Soviet Navy – A total of 87 boats were built for the Soviet Navy between 1960 and 1970. The boats were built at yards in Zelenodolsk and Yaroslavl.

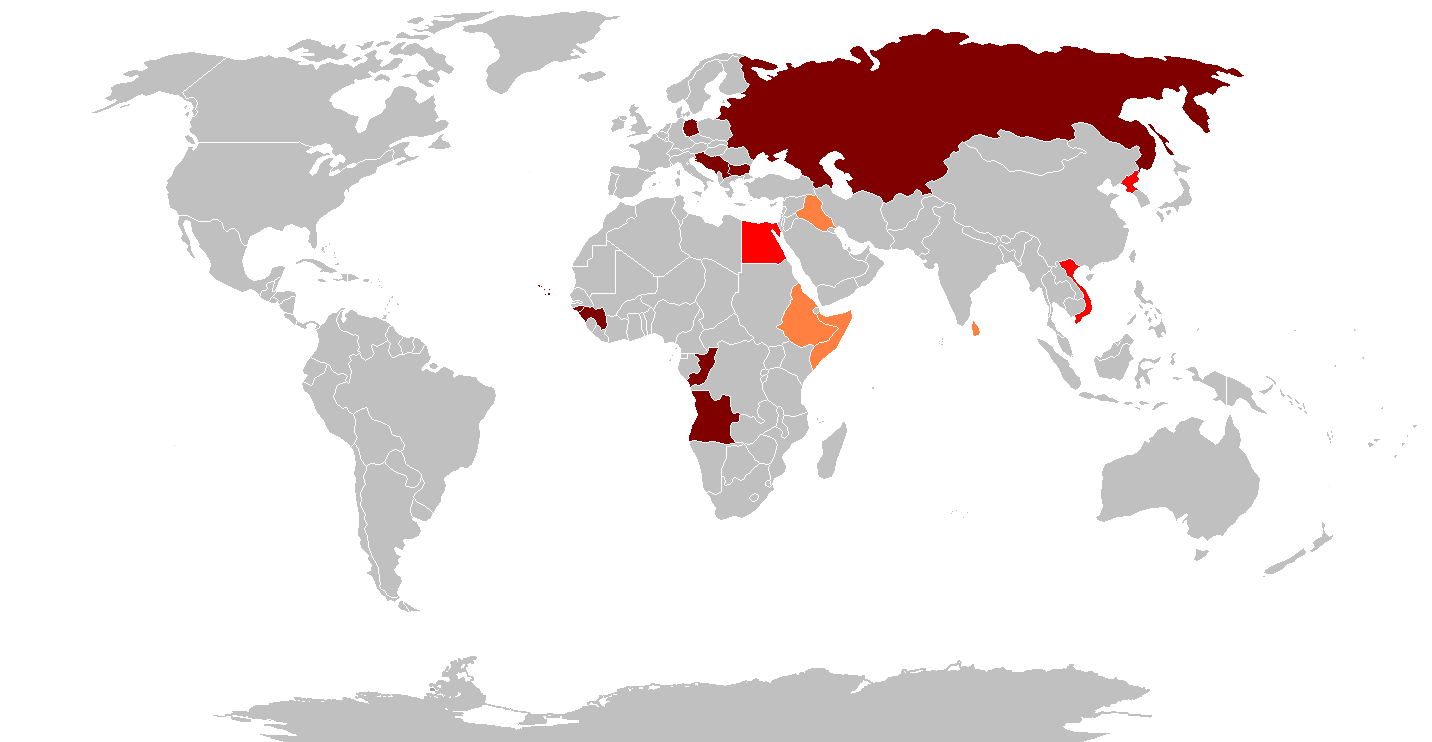
Former users of the Shershen in dark red, current in light. Orange nations used the Mol version

Project 206 boats were exported to:

- Angola – 4 boats.
- Bulgaria – 7 boats, delivered in 1970. They were discarded and scrapped in 1992.
- Cambodia – 1 unit; ex-Vietnamese, ex-USSR donated by Vietnam in 1998. No torpedo tubes or DC racks. Due to refurbishment before the transfer, this is one of the more active units in the Cambodian navy.
- Cape Verde – 2 units, ex-Soviet boats were donated by the USSR in 1979. New hull numbers were 451 and 452. Both were delivered with the torpedo tubes removed. Discarded in the late 1980s.
- Republic of the Congo – 1 unit, delivered in 1979. The boat was ex-Soviet and had the torpedo tubes removed prior to transfer. It was non-operational by the late 1980s.
- Egypt – 6 boats (In service), 7 units: Hull numbers 751, 752, 753, 755, 757, 759, 761; transferred from the USSR in 1967–1968. 752 was deleted after the Yom Kippur War. In 1987, 751 and 753 were refurbished by Ismailia Shipyard in Egypt; with Thompson-CSF DR875 ESM added. The other four had their torpedo tubes replaced by a BM-21 multiple-launcher shore bombardment rocket system on either side of the bridge, and a SA-N-5 "Grail" shoulder-launched SAM added in a tub aft. In the late 1990s, the six were downgraded to gun-only harbour patrol boats, with torpedoes, MLRS, and SAMs deleted.
- East Germany – 18 boats, The East German boats were delivered without the depth charge racks. The pennant numbers were changed regularly. Three of the class were always allocated to a training role and carried a "S" number. Assigned to the 6th Flotilla, the ships were based at Dranske. The first was delivered in October 1968, the last in October 1971. East Germany's Volksmarine used the type heavily, and kept them in service alongside their intended replacements, the Osa I class missile boats. They began to decommission in 1984 and the last four were withdrawn in early 1990, eight months before East Germany itself collapsed.
- Guinea – 3 units, delivered in 1978 and 1979. The torpedo tubes were deleted prior to transfer. All were discarded by 1993.
- Guinea-Bissau – 1 unit, ex-Soviet boat was donated by the USSR in December 1978, with the torpedo tubes and DC racks deleted. It was non-operational shortly after transfer and possibly never was fully operational.
- Vietnam – 16 units, transferred from the USSR between 1973 and 1980. They began to decommission around 2000 and by July 2006, there were only four left in service. The surviving units have a quad SA-N-5 short-range SAM installed.
- Yugoslavia – 14 units; four built in USSR and the remainder under license at Tito Shipyard in Yugoslavia. Two were captured by Croatia in 1991, and one of them was sunk as a target by the Croatian Navy in 1994. The remaining 12 were decommissioned in 1993.

=== Project 206E ===
A simplified version, Project 206E, known to NATO as the Mol class, was built for export. One boat was retained by the Soviets to train foreign crews.

- Ethiopia – 2 boats.
- Iraq – 2 boats.
- Somalia – 4 boats.
- Sri Lanka – 4 boats.

== See also ==
- List of ships of the Soviet Navy
- List of ships of Russia by project number
