= Muravey-class patrol boat =

Class overview
- Name: Muravey class (Project 133 Antares)
- Operators: Soviet Navy; Russian Navy; Ukrainian Navy
- Preceded by: Turya-class torpedo boat
- Built: 1976-1989
- In service: 1979-2009
- Completed: 12
- Retired: 12

General characteristics
- Type: Hydrofoil patrol boat
- Displacement: 180 tons standard; 230 tons full load
- Length: 40 m (131 ft 3 in)
- Beam: 7.6 m (24 ft 11 in)
- Draught: 1.9 m (6 ft 3 in) (4 m (13 ft 1 in) foilborne)
- Propulsion: 2 shaft gas turbines M-70 (M70FRU), 22,000 hp (16,000 kW)
- Speed: 40 knots (74 km/h; 46 mph) (60 knots (110 km/h; 69 mph) in some sources)
- Crew: 30
- Sensors & processing systems: Radar: Pot Drum, Muff Cob, High Pole; Sonar: Foal Tail
- Armament: 1 × 76 mm gun (single mounting forward); 1 AK-630 CIWS (aft); 2 × 406 mm torpedo tubes

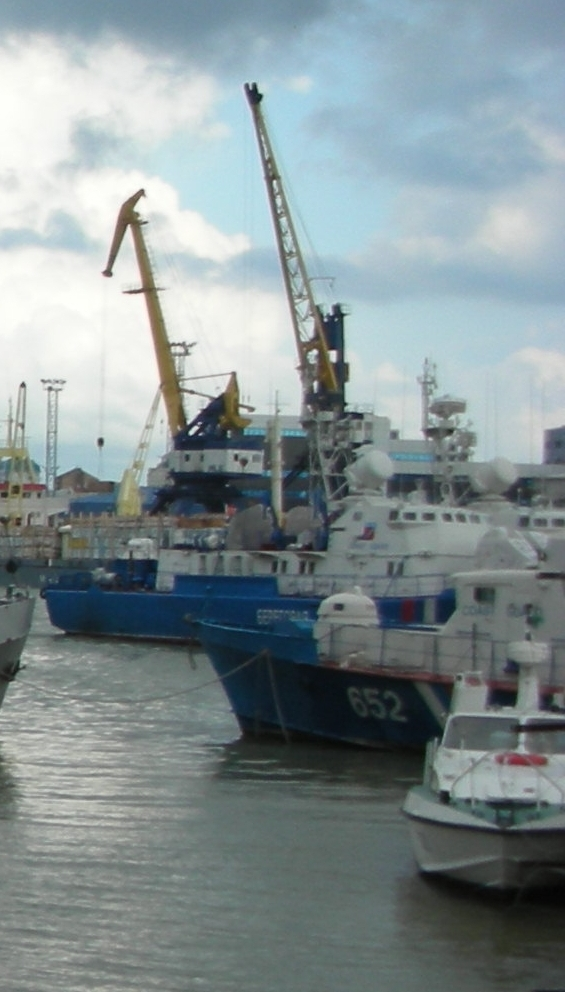

The Muravey class is the NATO reporting name for a class of hydrofoil patrol boats built for the Soviet Navy.

The Soviet designation was Project 133 Antares.

== Design ==
The ships were designed as coast guard patrol vessels and were built in the More Shipyard in Feodosiya for the Black Sea Fleet. They are powered by gas turbines in contrast to diesel engines used for most other Soviet fast attack craft to achieve higher speeds.

== Ships ==
11 units were built for the Soviet Navy between 1979 and 1992, while 1 unit was completed in 1993 for Ukraine.

- 8 were operated by the Russian Border guard
- 4 were operated by the Ukrainian Sea Guard

== Variants ==
- Project 133: basic hydrofoil
- Project 133RA: stealth version (unrealized)

== See also ==
- List of ships of the Soviet Navy
- List of ships of Russia by project number
