= GCGV General Mazniashvili =

Georgian Coast Guard cutter

History

United States
- Name: USCGC Point Baker (WPB-82342)
- Namesake: Point Baker, Alaska
- Owner: United States Coast Guard
- Builder: Coast Guard Yard, Curtis Bay, Maryland
- Commissioned: 30 October 1963
- Decommissioned: 6 February 2002
- Fate: Transferred to Georgia

Georgia
- Name: GCGV General Mazniashvili (P211)
- Namesake: Giorgi Mazniashvili, Georgian military officer
- Acquired: 6 February 2002
- Home port: Batumi
- Status: Ship in active service as of 2018

General characteristics
- Type: Patrol Boat (WPB)
- Displacement: 60 tons
- Length: 82 ft 10 in (25.25 m)
- Beam: 17 ft 7 in (5.36 m) max
- Draft: 5 ft 11 in (1.80 m)
- Propulsion: 1963 • 2 × 800 hp (597 kW) Cummins diesel engines; 1990 • 2 × 800 hp (597 kW) Caterpillar diesel engines
- Speed: 22.9 knots (42.4 km/h; 26.4 mph)
- Range: 542 nmi (1,004 km) at 18 kn (33 km/h; 21 mph); 1,500 nmi (2,800 km) at 9.4 kn (17.4 km/h; 10.8 mph)
- Complement: Domestic service : 8 men
- Armament: 1963 • 1 × Oerlikon 20 mm cannon

GCGV General Mazniashvili (P211) is an 82-foot (25 m) Point class cutter used by the Coast Guard of Georgia. The boat was originally known as USCGC Point Baker (WPB-82342), having been constructed at the Coast Guard Yard at Curtis Bay, Maryland, in 1963 for use as a law enforcement and search and rescue patrol boat. Since the Coast Guard policy in 1963 was not to name cutters under 100 feet (30 m) in length, it was designated as WPB-82342 when commissioned and acquired the name Point Baker in January 1964 when the Coast Guard started naming all cutters longer than 65 feet (20 m). In 2002 the boat was decommissioned and transferred to the Coast Guard of Georgia where she was commissioned as General Mazniashvili (P211), homeported in Batumi, Georgia.

== Construction and design details ==
Point Baker was built to accommodate an 8-man crew. She was powered by two 800 hp (597 kW) VT800 Cummins diesel main drive engines and had two five-bladed 42 in (1.1 m) propellers. Water tank capacity was 1,550 U.S. gallons (5,900 L) and fuel tank capacity was 1,840 U.S. gallons (7,000 L) at 95% full. After 1990 she was refit with 800 hp (597 kW) Caterpillar diesel main drive engines. Engine exhaust was ported through the transom rather than through a conventional stack and this permitted a 360 degree view from the bridge; a feature that was very useful in search and rescue work as well as a combat environment.

The design specifications for Point Baker included a steel hull for durability and an aluminum superstructure and longitudinally framed construction was used to save weight. Ease of operation with a small complement was possible because of the non-crewed main drive engine spaces. Controls and alarms located on the bridge allowed one man operation of the cutter thus eliminating a live engineer watch in the engine room. Because of design, four men could operate the cutter; however, the need for resting watchstanders brought the crew size to eight men for normal domestic service. The screws were designed for ease of replacement and could be changed without removing the cutter from the water. A clutch-in idle speed of three knots helped to conserve fuel on lengthy patrols and an eighteen knot maximum speed could get the cutter on scene quickly. Air-conditioned interior spaces were a part of the original design for the Point class cutter. Interior access to the deckhouse was through a watertight door on the starboard side aft of the deckhouse. The deckhouse contained the cabin for the officer-in-charge and the executive petty officer. The deckhouse also included a small arms locker, scuttlebutt, a small desk and head. Access to the lower deck and engine room was down a ladder. At the bottom of the ladder was the galley, mess and recreation deck. A watertight door at the front of the mess bulkhead led to the main crew quarters which was ten feet long and included six bunks that could be stowed, three bunks on each side. Forward of the bunks was the crew's head complete with a compact sink, shower and commode.

== History ==
After commissioning, Point Baker was initially stationed at Port Isabel, Texas, where she was used for law enforcement and search and rescue operations. In late 1966 her homeport was shifted to Port Aransas, Texas.

On 27 December 1966 she towed the disabled FV Sherry Ann to Port Aransas. On 15 June 1967 she towed the FV Old Man from 50 miles east southeast of Freeport, Texas to Aransas Pass, Texas following the medivac of the vessel's master by a Coast Guard helicopter. On 10 December she towed the disabled FV Baroness from 90 miles east northeast of Port Aransas to that port. On 8 September 1968 she towed the disabled FV Gulf Star to Port Aransas. While patrolling within the twelve mile limit in August 1975, Point Baker boarded and seized the Cuban fishing vessel E-82 for illegal fishing. The seized vessel was towed to Corpus Christi, Texas, where it was impounded and the Cuban crew was turned over to Department of Justice representatives. in January 1981 she made the largest seizure of illegal drugs up to that time off the coast of Texas when she seized over 15 tons of marijuana from the hold of a fishing vessel.

In 1991 she again changed homeports; this time to Sabine Pass, Texas, where she remained until decommissioning. During the mass exodus of Cuban and Haitian migrants in 1994 Point Baker rescued many persons from sub-standard vessels. In August, she along with another cutter rescued 200 Cubans from a sinking vessel.

During her Coast Guard career Point Baker and her crews earned three Coast Guard Unit Commendations and two Meritorious Unit Commendations.

Point Baker was decommissioned 6 February 2002 and was transferred to the Coast Guard of Georgia where she was commissioned as General Mazniashvili (P211), homeported in Batumi, Georgia.
