= Kaan 29-class patrol craft =

2001 Turkish patrol craft class

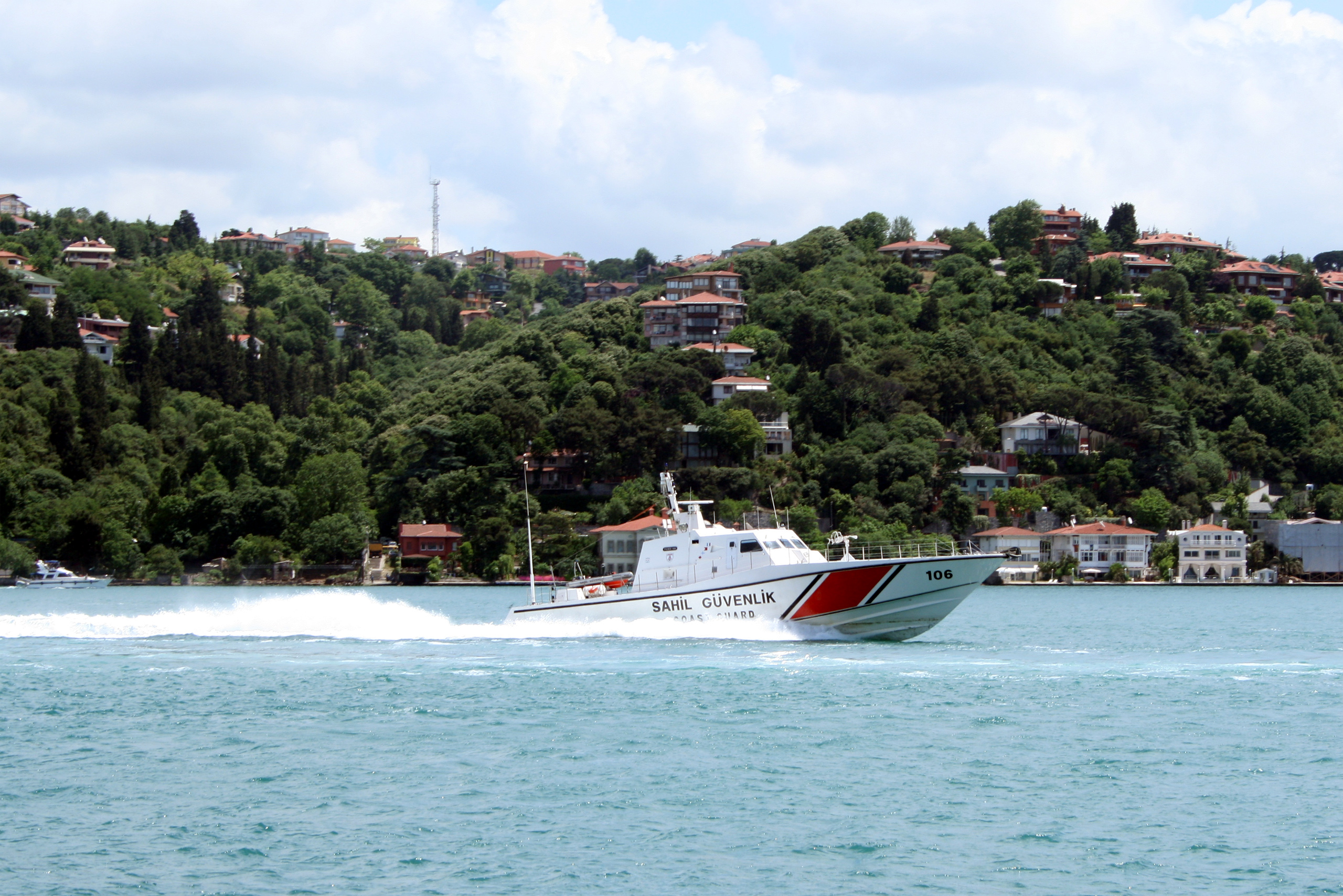
- Kaan 29-class fast patrol craft TCSG-106 on the Bosphorus.

Class overview
- Name: Kaan 29-class
- Builders: Yonca-Onuk Shipyard, Istanbul
- Operators: Turkish Coast Guard, Coast Guard of Georgia
- Built: 2001–2004
- Completed: 9

General characteristics
- Type: Patrol craft
- Length: 31.5 m (103 ft 4 in) o/a
- Beam: 6.7 m (22 ft 0 in)
- Draft: 1.42 m (4 ft 8 in)
- Propulsion: 2 × MTU 16V4000 engines; 2,720 kW (3,648 hp) each
- Speed: 48 knots (89 km/h; 55 mph)
- Complement: 14
- Armament: 4 × .50 caliber machine guns

Kaan 29-class fast patrol craft, known by the producer as Onuk MRTP 29, are boats of the Coast Guard Command of Turkey, built by Yonca-Onuk Shipyard in Istanbul. The first boat of its class – hull number TCSG-101 – was commissioned in 2001 and since then nine boats (Hull numbers TCSG-101 to TCSG-109) have been built. The last boat, TCSG-109, was delivered to the Turkish Coast Guard in April 2004.

The boat owes its high-speed to its high-engine output, deep-V hull design and reduced weight thanks to its advanced composite hull. Originally designed to reach speeds up to 60 knots, the boats are fitted with two MTU 16V4000 series engines outputting 2720 kW of max power each at 2160 rpm and were capable of speeds up to 48 kn (55 mph; 89 km/h). However, they were later fitted with two interceptors for trim control, which limited their maximum speed at 45 kn (52 mph; 83 km/h). The MTU diesels are paired with waterjet propulsion system by MJP, which make the boats very maneuverable.

The project was shelved in 2003, with the Kaan 33-class patrol boats, which were more seagoing and offered more space for the crew, storage and instruments.

These boats have also been built for the Pakistan Coast Guard.

== Bibliography ==
- Saunders, Stephen, ed. (2004). Jane's Fighting Ships 2004–2005. Coulsdon, UK: Jane's Information Group. ISBN 0-7106-2623-1.
