= 2017 Batumi hotel fire =

Building fire in Batumi, Georgia

Leogrand Hotel fire
- Date: November 24, 2017
- Venue: Leogrand Hotel & Casino
- Location: Batumi, Adjara, Georgia; 41°38′44.8″N 41°38′55.9″E
- Type: Fire
- Deaths: 11
- Injuries: 21

A fire in the Leogrand Hotel & Casino in Georgia's Black Sea city of Batumi occurred on the night of 24 to 25 November 2017. It left 11 people dead. After the incident, the hotel rebranded itself as Welmond.

== Incident ==
The fire in the 22-storey five-star hotel broke out around 20:00 local time, with many strongly suspecting the starting location at the spa center. Thirteen rescue and firefighting vehicles and approximately 100 firefighters were deployed and more than 100 people were evacuated. The hotel was due to host the Miss Georgia beauty pageant. None of the 20 contestants were injured. The owner and executive producer of the pageant told reporters that the contestants were in the middle of rehearsal when they were told to evacuate to a terrace.

== Victims ==
Eleven people, ten Georgian nationals and one Iranian national, died, all from inhaling fumes. Eight of the victims were found trapped in an elevator, one in a swimming pool, and two were discovered in the hotel gym. Twenty-one people were hospitalized of which were a firefighter, four Turkish nationals and one Israeli national.

== Investigation ==
Georgian Prime Minister Giorgi Kvirikashvili vowed to punish and identify all those that were responsible for the fire, with Interior Minister Giorgi Gakharia backing his calls for an investigation into the breach of fire-safety norms.

Police said an investigation into possible breaches of fire safety regulations was launched. In 2018 the Georgian Prosecutor's Office requested the detention of a Turkish citizen who was the technical manager of the hotel, and a Georgian citizen who was a staff manager of the technical storage team. Investigators determined that easily inflammable materials which had been placed in the technical storage room helped intensify the fire and caused strong smoke. The hotel was also not equipped with automatic fire and smoke alarm systems.

The two detained men, the Turkish manager and the Georgian storage staff member, were sentenced by the Batumi City Court to five years and six months and two years in prison, respectively.

== Aftermath ==
The Government of Georgia declared a national day of mourning for November 27 for all of the victims of the fire. The Catholicos Patriach of All Georgia Ilia II expressed his sympathy for the tragedy and offered his condolences to the victims and their families from the Georgian Church at a service he delivered at the hotel.

Shortly after the fire, a new law was prepared by the Emergency Management Service for parliament that increased fines imposed on fire safety rules by ten times. Also noted for the creation of the bill was multiple previous shopping center fires in Tbilisi.
