= GCGV Tsotne Dadiani =

United States Coast Guard cutter

History

United States
- Name: USCGC Point Countess (WPB-82335)
- Builder: U.S. Coast Guard Yard
- Commissioned: 8 August 1962
- Decommissioned: 25 May 2000
- Home port: Nokomis, Florida
- Fate: Sold to Republic of Georgia, 2000

Georgia
- Name: GCGV Tsotne Dadiani (P210)
- Namesake: Tsotne Dadiani
- Acquired: 29 June 2000
- Home port: Poti
- Status: in active service

General characteristics
- Class & type: Point-class cutter
- Displacement: 60 tons
- Length: 82 ft 10 in (25.25 m)
- Beam: 17 ft 7 in (5.36 m) max
- Draft: 5 ft 11 in (1.80 m)
- Propulsion: 2 × 800 hp (597 kW) Cummins diesel engines; refit in the 1990s with 800 hp Caterpillar diesel engines; 2 × 42 inches (1.1 m) five-bladed propellers
- Speed: 14.45 knots (26.76 km/h; 16.63 mph)
- Range: 590 nmi (1,090 km)
- Complement: USCG service, 8 men; Republic of Georgia service, 11 men; 2 officers; 2 chief petty officers; 7 enlisted men
- Armament: 1962, 1 × Oerlikon 20 mm cannon

USCGC Point Countess (WPB-82335) was an 82-foot (25 m) Point class cutter constructed at the Coast Guard Yard at Curtis Bay, Maryland in 1962 for use as a law enforcement and search and rescue patrol boat. Since the Coast Guard policy in 1962 was not to name cutters under 100 feet (30 m) in length, it was designated as WPB-82335 when commissioned and acquired the name Point Countess in January 1964 when the Coast Guard started naming all cutters longer than 65 feet (20 m).

== Design and construction details ==
Point Countess was built to accommodate an 8-man crew. She was powered by two 800 hp (597 kW) VT800 Cummins diesel main drive engines and had two five-bladed 42 in (1.1 m) propellers. Water tank capacity was 1,550 U.S. gallons (5,900 L) and fuel tank capacity was 1,840 U.S. gallons (7,000 L) at 95% full. After 1990 she was refit with 800 hp (597 kW) Caterpillar diesel main drive engines. Engine exhaust was ported through the transom rather than through a conventional stack and this permitted a 360-degree view from the bridge; a feature that was very useful in search and rescue work as well as a combat environment.

The design specifications for Point Countess included a steel hull for durability and an aluminum superstructure and longitudinally framed construction was used to save weight. Ease of operation with a small crew size was possible because of the non-manned main drive engine spaces. Controls and alarms located on the bridge allowed one man operation of the cutter thus eliminating a live engineer watch in the engine room. Because of design, four men could operate the cutter; however, the need for resting watchstanders brought the crew size to eight men for normal domestic service. The screws were designed for ease of replacement and could be changed without removing the cutter from the water. A clutch-in idle speed of three knots helped to conserve fuel on lengthy patrols and an eighteen knot maximum speed could get the cutter on scene quickly. Air-conditioned interior spaces were a part of the original design for the Point class cutter. Interior access to the deckhouse was through a watertight door on the starboard side aft of the deckhouse. The deckhouse contained the cabin for the officer-in-charge and the executive petty officer. The deckhouse also included a small arms locker, scuttlebutt, a small desk and head. Access to the lower deck and engine room was down a ladder. At the bottom of the ladder was the galley, mess and recreation deck. A watertight door at the front of the mess bulkhead led to the main crew quarters which was ten feet long and included six bunks that could be stowed, three bunks on each side. Forward of the bunks was the crew's head complete with a compact sink, shower and commode.

== History ==
Point Countess was stationed at Bellingham, Washington from 1962 to 1965. In 1966 and 1967, she was stationed at Everett, Washington. Point Countess was painted gray in 1967 and readied for action in Vietnam in support of Operation Market Time. At the last minute she was ordered to relieve the USCGC Cape Henlopen at Port Angeles, Washington. She was stationed at Port Angeles from 1968 to 1988.

On 8 July 1968, she towed a disabled pleasure craft to Everett. On 1 October 1968, she towed the disabled FV Beatrice 30 miles west of Port Angeles to that port. On 21 February 1969, she towed the disabled pleasure craft Betty J II from 25 miles west of Port Angeles to that port. On 18 January 1986, she helped seize MV Eagle 1 entering the Strait of Juan de Fuca carrying 447 lbs of cocaine, the largest cocaine seizure by the Coast Guard to that date.

From 1988 until her decommissioning in 2000, she was stationed at Nokomis, Florida. Here she continued in her law enforcement and search and rescue duties successfully. In late 1988, she seized pleasure craft Premolo in the Yucatán Channel carrying 800 lbs of cocaine in a concealed compartment. Additionally, she seized 8.5 million dollars' worth of cocaine from a sailing vessel entering Tampa Bay, 5 tons of cocaine from the Belizean-flagged vessel Inge Frank, and the prosecution of dozens of personal use narcotics cases each year. In addition, she interdicted over 35 wanted felons from 1997 through her decommissioning. Point Countess was decommissioned 25 May 2000 and transferred to the Republic of Georgia on 25 June 2000.

== Republic of Georgia service ==
The Republic of Georgia renamed her Georgia Coast Guard Vessel Tsotne Dadiani (P210). During the 2008 South Ossetia war, Tsotne Dadiani sortied with other Coast Guard vessels from Poti, prior to Russian forces arriving. The Tsotne Dadiani was in the southern port of Batumi until September 2008 when Russian forces withdrew and the Georgian Coast Guard Operations Directorate returned to its base in Poti.
