= Alexander Javakhishvili (admiral) =

- ალექსანდრე ჯავახიშვილი
- Born: February 18, 1932; Tbilisi
- Died: July 31, 2017 (aged 85)
- Military career
- Allegiance: Soviet Union; Georgia
- Branch: Soviet Navy; Georgian Navy
- Service years: Soviet Union 1949–1989; Georgia 1991–1996
- Rank: Rear Admiral
- Commands: Georgian Navy

Alexander Javakhishvili (Georgian: ალექსანდრე ჯავახიშვილი; Russian: Александр Давидович Джавахишвили, romanized: Aleksandr Davidovich Dzhavakhishvili; February 18, 1932 – July 31, 2017) was a Georgian rear-admiral and commander of the Georgian navy from 1991 to 1996. A former Soviet navy submariner, he directed efforts at building the navy of independent Georgia in the 1990s.

== Biography ==
Javakhishvili was born in Tbilisi, the capital of then-Soviet Georgia in 1932. After serving his compulsory military service as a Radioman on board the Soviet cruiser Molotov between 1949 and 1952, he was trained at the Caspian Maritime College in Baku, and commissioned as an officer in the Soviet Navy, becoming Captain 1st Rank, and in 1970 commander of the Pacific Fleet Navaga-class ballistic missile submarine К-415, with which he conducted, from January to March 1972, a trans-Pacific submerged circumnavigation. He served as Deputy Chief of the 55th Naval Infantry Division between 1974 and 1977, as Vice Director of the A. A. Grechko Naval Academy between 1977 and 1980, as Commanding Officer of the 2nd Submarine Squadron of the Baltic Fleet between 1980 and 1982, as Principal of Nakhimov Higher Naval School (Sevastopol) between 1982 and 1985. He served as Chief of Logistics of the Far East Fleet from 1985 till retirement in 1989

After Georgia's independence in 1991, Javakhishvili became a commander of the embryonic Georgian navy. With the outbreak of hostilities in Abkhazia, he personally led a successful rescue operation of Georgian civilians trapped in the Abkhaz-controlled resort town of Pitsunda on August 18, 1992. He was promoted to the rank of rear-admiral on July 10, 1996, becoming the first person to have been awarded with the rank of admiral by Georgia. By that time, Javakhishvili's relations with the country's defense minister Vardiko Nadibaidze soured. In November 1996, he was fired for "failing to eradicate financial irregularites and raise the combat efficiency of the service", accusations which Javakhishvili rejected. He was succeeded by Captain 1st Rank Otar Chkhartishvili, a 47-year-old officer from the Russian navy, in March 1997.

Javakhishvili has since lived in retirement. He gave an interview to the Georgian service of the RFE/RL in 2008, critical of Georgia's decision to merge the navy with the coast guard under the Ministry of Internal Affairs.

Military offices
Preceded by Office created	Commander of the Georgian Navy; 1991–1996	Succeeded by Otar Chkhartishvili
