= Sergo Kutivadze =

Georgian and Soviet footballer and coach

Sergei Kutivadze
Personal information
- Full name: Sergei Kutivadze
- Date of birth: 16 October 1944
- Place of birth: Alma-Ata, Kazakh SSR, USSR
- Date of death: 7 June 2017 (aged 72)
- Place of death: Tbilisi, Georgia
- Position: Midfielder

Senior career*
Years	Team	Apps	(Gls)
1962–1966	FC Torpedo Kutaisi	128	(9)
1967–1973	FC Dinamo Tbilisi	119	(13)
Total		247	(22)

International career
1965	USSR	1	(0)

Managerial career
- 1974–1982: FC Dinamo Tbilisi (assistant)
- 1983: FC Dinamo Tbilisi (director)
- 1984: FC Dinamo Tbilisi (assistant)
- * Club domestic league appearances and goals

Sergei (or Sergo) Kutivadze (Georgian: სერგო კუტივაძე, Russian: Серге́й Иванович Кутивадзе) (16 October 1944 – 7 June 2017) was a Georgian and Soviet football player and coach. After retiring from playing, he coached FC Dinamo Tbilisi and FC Torpedo Kutaisi.

== International career ==
Kutivadze played his only game for the USSR on 4 September 1965 in a friendly against Yugoslavia.
