= AB-25-class patrol craft =

1960s Turkish patrol craft class

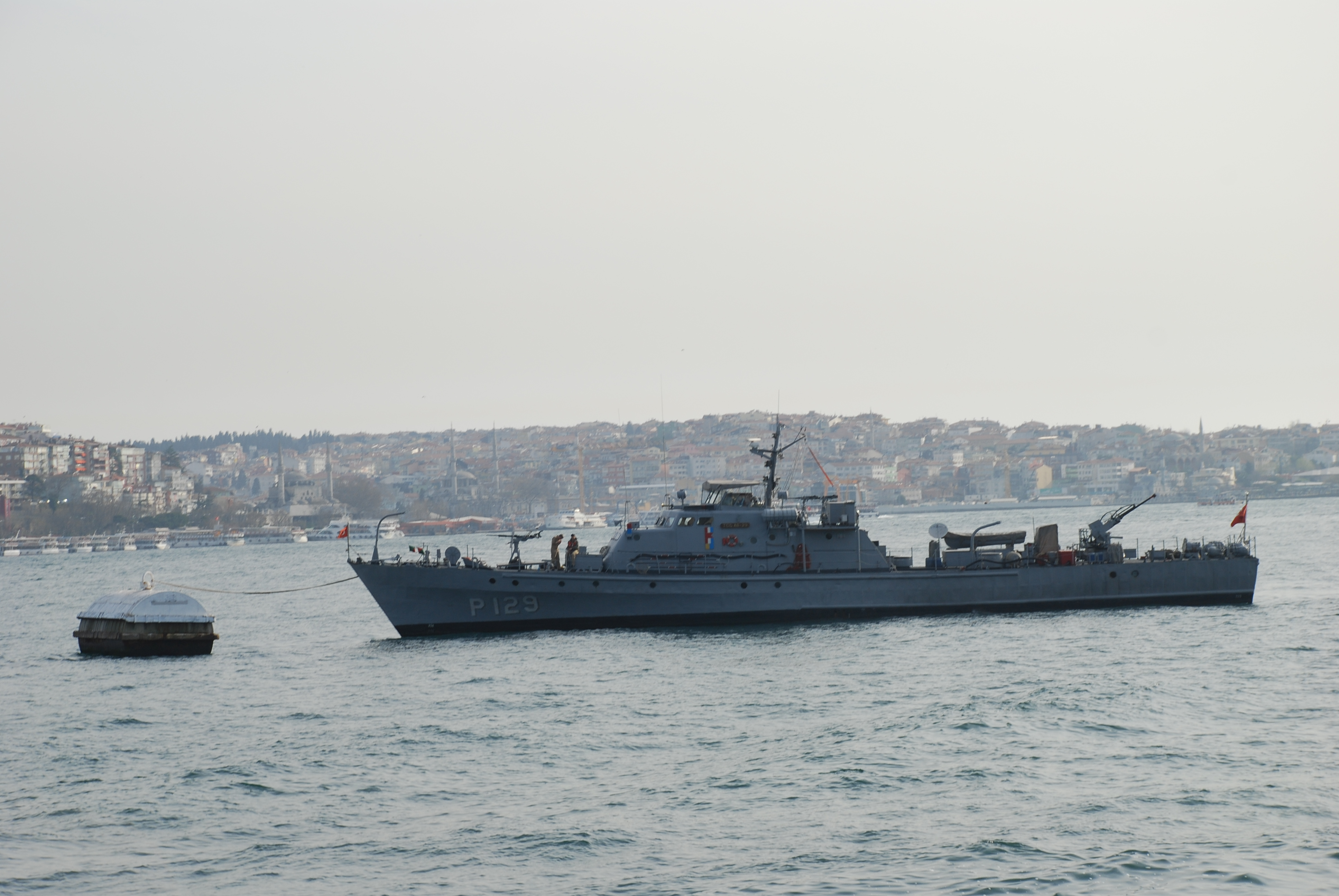
- TCG AB-29 (P-129)

Class overview
- Builders: Istanbul Camialtı Shipyard
- Operators: Turkey; Azerbaijan; Georgia (country); Kazakhstan
- In commission: 1969-present
- Completed: 12
- Active: 10
- Retired: 2

General characteristics
- Type: Attack boat
- Displacement: 170 tons (full load)
- Length: 132 ft (40 m)
- Draft: 5 ft 5 in (1.65 m)
- Speed: 22 knots (41 km/h)
- Complement: 3 officers, 28 enlisted
- Armament: 1 or 2 Bofors 40 mm/70, 1 Oerlikon 20 mm, 2 12.7 mm MGs

The AB-25 class (Türk type) is a class of large patrol craft that was built for the Turkish Navy in the late 1960s and early 1970s. One craft was transferred to Georgia in 1998, two were transferred to Kazakhstan in 1999 and 2001, one was transferred to Azerbaijan in 2000 and the remainder are in service.

== Units ==
- AB-25 (P-125) - out of service in 2000
- AB-26 (P-126) - transferred to Kazakhstan in 1999
- AB-27 (P-127)
- AB-28 (P-128)
- AB-29 (P-129)
- AB-30 (P-130) - transferred to Georgia in 1998
- AB-31 (P-131)
- AB-32 (P-132) - transferred to Kazakhstan in 2001
- AB-33 (P-133) - out of service in 2002
- AB-34 (P-134) - transferred to Azerbaijan in 2000
- AB-35 (P-135)
- AB-36 (P-136)
