= Yonca Shipyard =

Shipyard in Istanbul, Turkey

Coordinates: 40.84794°N 29.29360°E

- Native name: Yonca Teknik Tersanesi
- Industry: Shipbuilding
- Founded: 1986; 40 years ago
- Founder: Şakir Yılmaztürk
- Headquarters: Aydıntepe Kızılçam Sok. No:17, Tuzla, Istanbul, Turkey
- Area served: Worldwide
- Key people: Şakir Yılmaztürk (CEO)
- Website: yoncashipyard.com

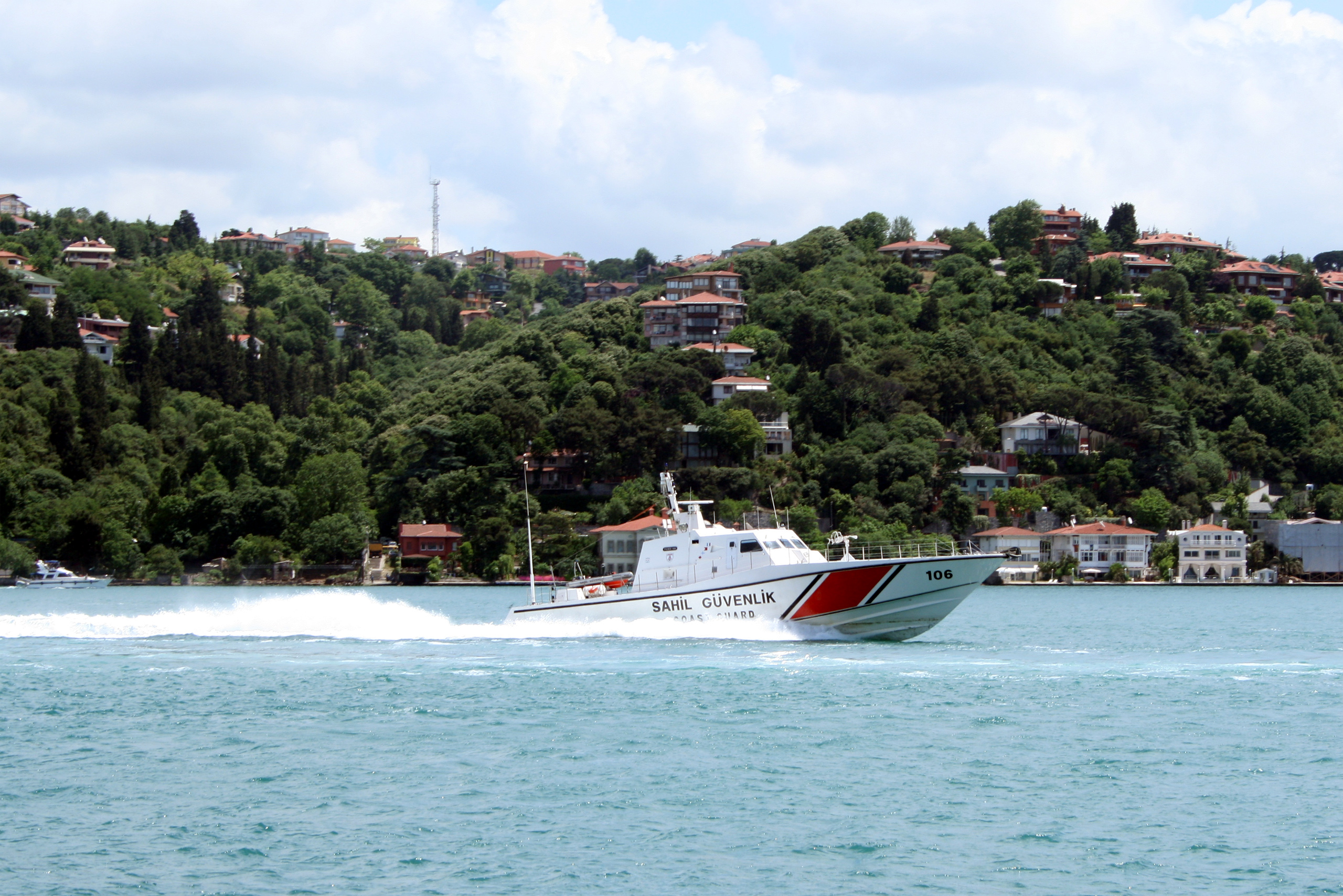
TCSG 106 of the Turkish Coast Guard, a Kaan 29-class patrol boat.

Yonca Shipyard (Turkish: Yonca Teknik Tersanesi) is a Turkish shipyard established in Istanbul, Turkey in 1986. It builds fast patrol boats for the defence and law enforcement missions.

== History ==
The history of the building fast patrol craft goes back to 1986 when Dr. Ekber Onuk, an aviation engineer, and his partner Şakir Yılmaztürk decided to establish the Yonca Shipyard to enter shipbuilding industry. Ekber Onuk's son Kaan, also an aviation engineer, who spent his childhood at the shipyard, built in 1989, a 15 m (49 ft)-long boat, named Yontech 45. An enclosed top version, designed by Nissan called Yontech 105, was awarded the bronze medal by the Industrial Design Society of America in 1992. In 1993, father and son Onuk decided to start a project called "Multi Role Tactical Platform" (MRTP) of developing a 2 m (6 ft 7 in) longer fast craft for armed military missions. Kaan's classmate from the university and ship designer Erdoğan Ertekin joined the team. The project came to standstill when the 22-year-old Kaan died in a road accident, and his sorrowed father stopped the works.

In 1996, the Undersecretariat for Defence issued an international invitation to tender for the procurement of six fast patrol boats for the Turkish Coast Guard. Şakir Yılmaztürk convinced Ekber Onuk to resume the project. The fast patrol boat Onuk MRTP-15 won the bid. The first Onuk MRTP-15 was launched in June 1998. The vessels were named Kaan-class by the Turkish Coast Gard commemorating the late boat designer.

== Products ==
Works continued following the building of the first fast patrol boat. The shipyard exported its products to Georgia, United Arab Emirates, Pakistan and Malaysia. The product range cover eight different fast patrol craft and fast patrol/attack boats from 12.65 m (41.5 ft)-long MRTP 12 of speed plus 45 kn (83 km/h; 52 mph) to 52 m (171 ft)-long MRTP 49 of speed plus 60 kn (110 km/h; 69 mph). An interceptor boat of type MRTP 16, of which examples were sold to several countries, set a speed record at 76.4 kn (141.5 km/h; 87.9 mph) with full payload. by mid-July 2020. The shipyard has delivered a total of 165 boats in different classes to 12 government organizations in 9 countries.

Built in advanced composite materials structure, the boats are propulsed by twin diesel engines of size ranging from 550 hp (410 kW) up to 4,630 hp (3,450 kW), and driven by water jets installed.

The patrol boats are fitted with different type of armament, such as the Aselsan 12.7 mm stabilized machine (STAMP), Aselsan stabilized turret 25/30 mm STOP, short range Surface-to-Ship Missile (SSM), Surface-to-Air Missile (SAM), and 40 mm Stinger Barrel Gun.

== Coast Guard and Navy vessels ==
Ship class !,	Type	Operators !	Ordered	Built	Ref
Yonca Onuk MRTP-class; Fast patrol/Attack Craft	MRTP 12	Pakistan Navy		15	
Yonca Onuk MRTP-class; Fast patrol/Attack Craft	MRTP 15	Turkey Coast Guard		18	
Yonca Onuk MRTP-class; Fast patrol/Attack Craft	MRTP 16	Malaysia Coast Guard	10		
Yonca Onuk MRTP-class; Fast patrol/Attack Craft	MRTP 16	Oman Coast Guard		2	
Yonca Onuk MRTP-class; Fast patrol/Attack Craft	MRTP 16	Somalia Somali Navy		11	
Yonca Onuk MRTP-class; Fast patrol/Attack Craft	MRTP 16	Pakistan Navy		6	
Yonca Onuk MRTP-class; Fast patrol/Attack Craft	MRTP 19	Turkey Coast Guard		17	
Yonca Onuk MRTP-class; Fast patrol/Attack Craft	MRTP 20	Egypt Coast Guard	6	3	
Yonca Onuk MRTP-class; Fast patrol/Attack Craft	MRTP 20	United Arab Emirates Coast Guard	34		
Yonca Onuk MRTP-class; Fast patrol/Attack Craft	MRTP 24	Kuwait Coast Guard		17	
Yonca Onuk MRTP-class; Fast patrol/Attack Craft	MRTP 24	Qatar Special Forces		8	
Yonca Onuk MRTP-class; Fast patrol/Attack Craft	MRTP 29	(Turkey) Coast Guard		9	
MRTP 33	Turkey Coast Guard		13		
