= Black Sea Naval Force =

The Black Sea Naval Force (also known as BLACKSEAFOR or the Black Sea Naval Cooperation Task Group) is a Black Sea naval cooperation program established in 2001 on the initiative of Turkey with the participation of Bulgaria, Romania, Ukraine, Russia and Georgia.

== History ==
The original purpose of BLACKSEAFOR was "to cooperatively promote security and stability in the Black Sea maritime area and beyond, strengthen friendship and good neighborly relations among the regional States, and increase interoperability among those states' naval forces".

The BLACKSEAFOR has conducted several joint naval drills since its formation, however it has been suspended several times. The 2008 Russo-Georgian war lead Georgia to suspend its involvement in BLACKSEAFOR drills and Russia to refuse to take part in drills involving Georgia. The partnership was effectively suspended in 2014 following the Russian annexation of Crimea and War in Donbas. In 2015, after a Russian plane was shot down by Turkish forces, Russia suspended its BLACKSEAFOR membership.

== See also ==
- Operation Black Sea Harmony
- 1936 Montreux Convention governing the passage of military ships into the Black Sea
- Organization of the Black Sea Economic Cooperation – International organization
- Operation Active Endeavour – Military operation
