= Turya-class torpedo boat =

Class of Soviet hydrofoil torpedo boats

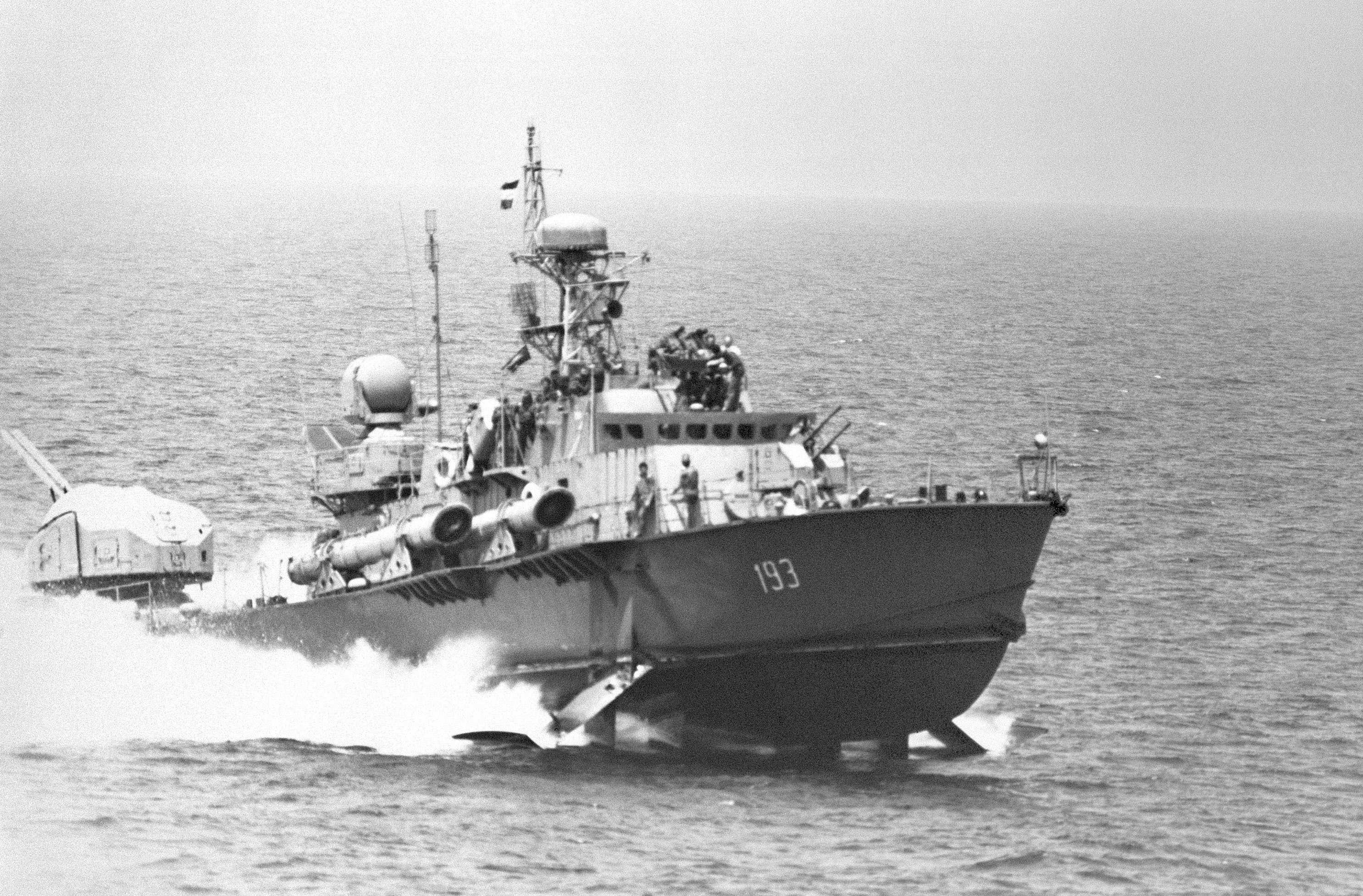
- A Project 206M "Shtorm" (NATO - Turya class) patrol fast attack craft hydrofoil of the Cuban Navy

Class overview
- Name: Turya class (Project 206M)
- Operators: see below
- Preceded by: Shershen class
- Built: 1972–1976
- In service: 1972–present
- Completed: 51?

General characteristics
- Type: hydrofoil torpedo boat
- Displacement: 220 tons standard, 250 tons full load
- Length: 39.6 m
- Beam: 7.6 m
- Draught: 4 m
- Propulsion: 3× M503 B2 Diesels; 15,000 hp
- Speed: 40 knots
- Range: 600 nm at 37 knots, 1450 nm at 14 knots
- Crew: 30
- Sensors & processing systems: Radar: Pot Drum, Muff Comb, High Pole, Sonar: Foal Tail
- Armament: 2 × 57mm AK-725 guns (twin turret aft); 2 × 25mm 110-PM guns (2M-3 twin turret forward); 4 × 533mm torpedo tubes

"Turya class" is the NATO reporting name for a class of hydrofoil torpedo boats built for the Soviet Navy and Soviet allies. The Soviet designation was Project 206M.

== Design ==
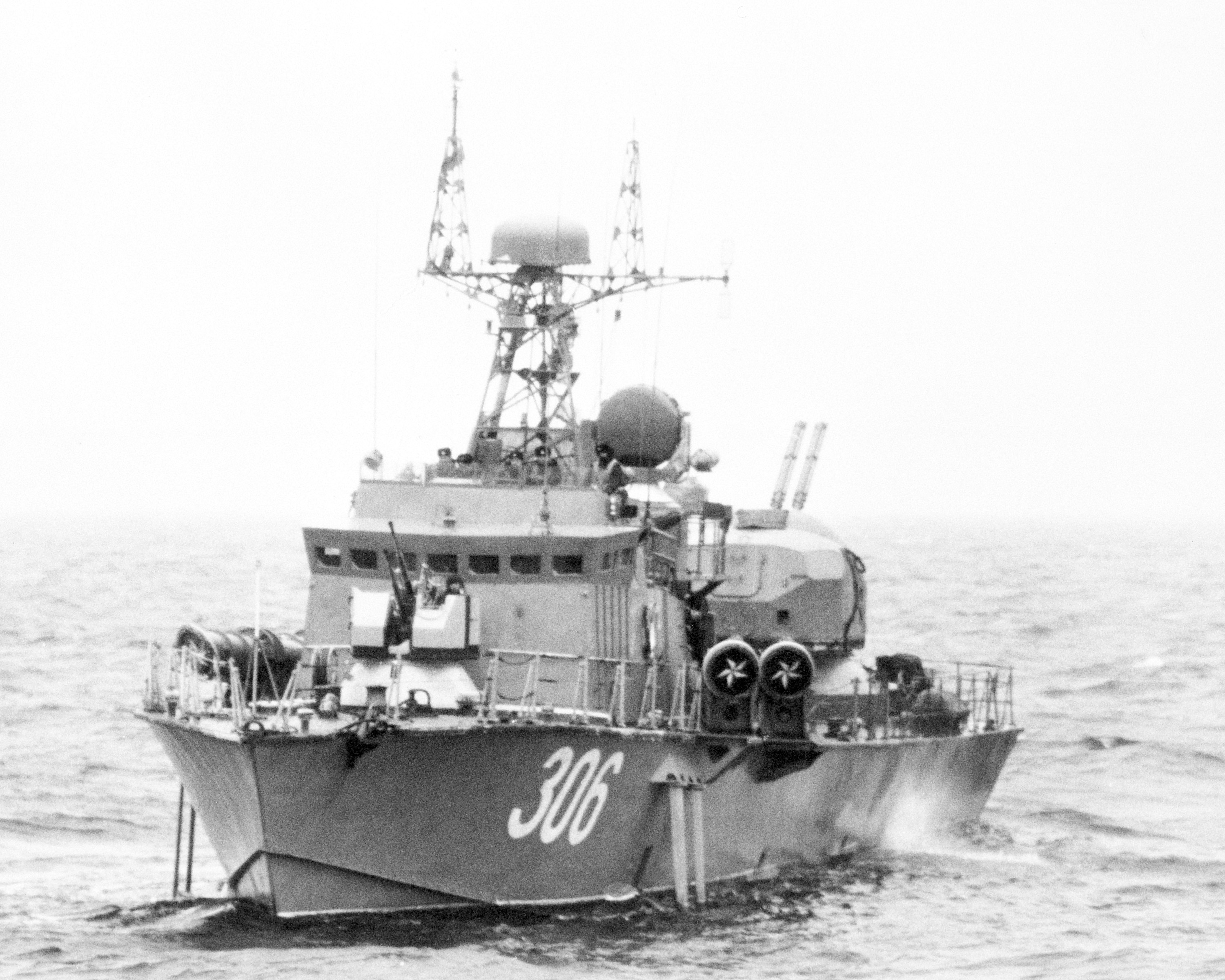

The Turya class is a derivative of the Shershen-class torpedo boat. A hydroplane was added forward to increase speed. These boats can operate at 40 knots at sea state 4 and 35 knots at sea state 5. A heavier twin 57 mm gun was added aft in response to NATO fast attack craft being fitted with the 76 mm OTO Melara gun. The boats are fitted with a helicopter type dipping sonar aft. The 533mm (21 inch) torpedo tubes can fire either anti-ship or anti-submarine torpedoes.

Export boats were not fitted with dipping sonar.

== Ships ==
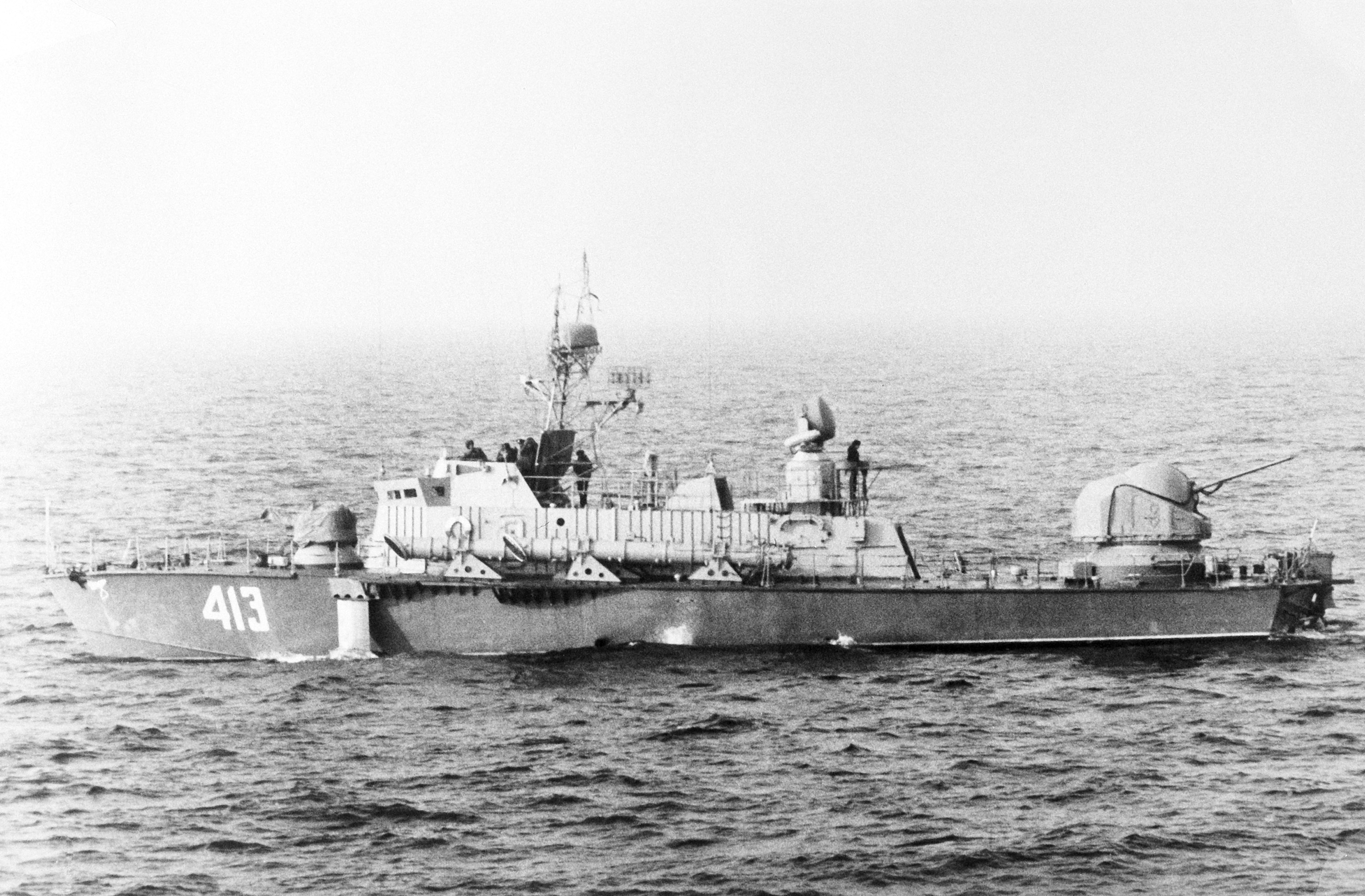

=== Soviet Navy ===
30 (29 in some sources) boats were built for the Soviet Navy between 1972 and 1976. The Builders were at Kolpino and the Ulis yard in Vladivostok.

The last three boats in service with the Russian Navy were stationed with the Caspian Flotilla

=== Export ===
- Cambodia - 2 boats
- Cuba: Cuban Navy - 9 boats (1979–1983)
- Ethiopia - 2 boats (1985-1992)
- Seychelles - 1 boat (1986–1995)
- Vietnam: Vietnamese People's Navy - 5 boats

== See also ==
- List of ships of the Soviet Navy
- List of ships of Russia by project number
