= Military ranks of the Royal Cambodian Armed Forces =

The military ranks of Cambodia are the military insignia used by the Royal Cambodian Armed Forces. Being a dominion of France, Cambodia shares a rank structure similar to that of France.

== Commissioned officer ranks ==
The rank insignia of commissioned officers.

Rank group	General / flag officers					Senior officers			Junior officers
Royal Cambodian Army
Royal Cambodian Army	នាយឧត្ដមសេនីយ៍ផុតលេខ; Neay utdamsenei phot lek	នាយឧត្ដមសេនីយ៍ Neay utdamsenei	ឧត្ដមសេនីយ៍ឯក; Utdamsenei ek	ឧត្តមសេនីយ៍ទោ Utdamsenei tou	ឧត្តមសេនីយ៍ត្រី Utdamsenei trei	វរសេនីយ៍ឯក; Veareasenei ek	វរសេនីយ៍ទោ Veareasenei tou	វរសេនីយ៍ត្រី Veareasenei trei	អនុសេនីយ៍ឯក; Anusenei ek	អនុសេនីយ៍ទោ Anusenei tou	អនុសេនីយ៍ត្រី Anusenei trei
Royal Cambodian Navy
Royal Cambodian Navy		នាយឧត្ដមនាវី Neay Utdamneavi	ឧត្ដមនាវីឯក; Utdamneavi ek	ឧត្តមនាវីទោ Utdamneavi tou	ឧត្តមនាវីត្រី Utdamneavi trei	វរនាវីឯក; Veareaneavi ek	វរនាវីទោ Veareaneavi tou	វរនាវីត្រី Veareaneavi trei	អនុនាវីឯក; Anuneavi ek	អនុនាវីទោ Anuneavi tou	អនុនាវីត្រី Anuneavi trei
Royal Cambodian Air Force
Royal Cambodian Air Force		នាយឧត្ដមសេនីយ៍ Neay utdamsenei	ឧត្ដមសេនីយ៍ឯក; Utdamsenei ek	ឧត្តមសេនីយ៍ទោ Utdamsenei tou	ឧត្តមសេនីយ៍ត្រី Utdamsenei trei	វរសេនីយ៍ឯក; Veareasenei ek	វរសេនីយ៍ទោ Veareasenei tou	វរសេនីយ៍ត្រី Veareasenei trei	អនុសេនីយ៍ឯក; Anusenei ek	អនុសេនីយ៍ទោ Anusenei tou	អនុសេនីយ៍ត្រី Anusenei trei
Royal Cambodian Gendarmerie
Royal Cambodian Gendarmerie		នាយឧត្ដមសេនីយ៍ Neay utdamsenei	ឧត្ដមសេនីយ៍ឯក; Utdamsenei ek	ឧត្តមសេនីយ៍ទោ Utdamsenei tou	ឧត្តមសេនីយ៍ត្រី Utdamsenei trei	វរសេនីយ៍ឯក; Veareasenei ek	វរសេនីយ៍ទោ Veareasenei tou	វរសេនីយ៍ត្រី Veareasenei trei	អនុសេនីយ៍ឯក; Anusenei ek	អនុសេនីយ៍ទោ Anusenei tou	អនុសេនីយ៍ត្រី Anusenei trei
Rank group	General / flag officers					Senior officers			Junior officers

=== Student officer ranks ===
Branch	Army	Navy	Air force	Gendarmerie
Insignia
	នាយចំណង់ Neay chamnang

== Other ranks ==
The rank insignia of non-commissioned officers and enlisted personnel.

Rank group	Senior NCOs					Junior NCOs		Enlisted
Royal Cambodian Army
Royal Cambodian Army	ព្រឹន្ទបាលឯក; Pruentobal ek	ព្រឹន្ទបាលទោ Pruentobal tou	ពលបាលឯក; Polobal ek	ពលបាលទោ Polobal tou	ពលបាលត្រី Polobal trei	នាយឯក; Neay ek	នាយទោ Neay tou	ពលឯក; Pol ek	ពលទោ Pol tou
Royal Cambodian Navy
Royal Cambodian Navy	នាយចក្របាលឯក; Neay chakrabal ek	នាយចក្របាលទោ Neay chakrabal tou	ចក្របាលឯក; Chakrabal ek	ចក្របាលទោ Chakrabal tou	ចក្របាលត្រី Chakrabal trei	ចក្របាលរងឯក; Chakrabal rong ek	ចក្របាលរងទោ Chakrabal rong tou	នាវិកឯក; Neavik ek	នាវិកទោ Neavik tou
Royal Cambodian Air Force
Royal Cambodian Air Force	ព្រឹន្ទបាលឯក; Pruentobal ek	ព្រឹន្ទបាលទោ Pruentobal tou	ពលបាលឯក; Polobal ek	ពលបាលទោ Polobal tou	ពលបាលត្រី Polobal trei	នាយឯក; Neay ek	នាយទោ Neay tou	ពលឯក; Pol ek	ពលទោ Pol tou
Royal Cambodian Gendarmerie
Royal Cambodian Gendarmerie	ព្រឹន្ទបាលឯក; Pruentobal ek	ព្រឹន្ទបាលទោ Pruentobal tou	ពលបាលឯក; Polobal ek	ពលបាលទោ Polobal tou	ពលបាលត្រី Polobal trei	នាយឯក; Neay ek	នាយទោ Neay tou	ពលឯក; Pol ek	ពលទោ Pol tou
Rank group	Senior NCOs					Junior NCOs		Enlisted

== See also ==
- Military ranks of the People's Republic of Kampuchea
- Military ranks of the Khmer Republic
