= Royal Cambodian Air Force FC =

Cambodian football club

- Full name: Royal Cambodian Air Force Football Club
- Founded: 1953
- Ground: Phnom Penh, Cambodia
- Owner: Royal Cambodian Air Force
- League: Cambodian Premier League
- 2025–2026: 9th

The Royal Cambodian Air Force Football Club is a professional football club in Cambodia. It played in the Cambodian Premier League in the 2000s, the top division of Cambodian football for several seasons before it was relegated. The club is a branch of the Royal Cambodian Air Force, which in turn is a part of the Royal Cambodian Armed Forces.
