= Hun Phoeung =

Cambodian military officer

Lieutenant General Hun Phoeung is the Secretary of State of National Defense, Cambodia. He is the former commander of the Royal Cambodian Armed Forces.
