= Commander-in-Chief of the Armed Forces =

Commander-in-Chief of the Armed Forces may refer to:

- Commander-in-Chief of the Canadian Armed Forces
- Commander-in-chief of the Royal Cambodian Armed Forces
- Commander-in-chief of the Armed Forces of Haiti
- Commander-in-Chief of the Iranian Armed Forces
- Commander-in-Chief of the Malaysian Armed Forces
- Commander-in-Chief of the Armed Forces of Ukraine
