= Tea Banh =

Cambodian politician (born 1945)

Samdech Pichey Sena Tea Banh NM GCC MP
- ទៀ បាញ់
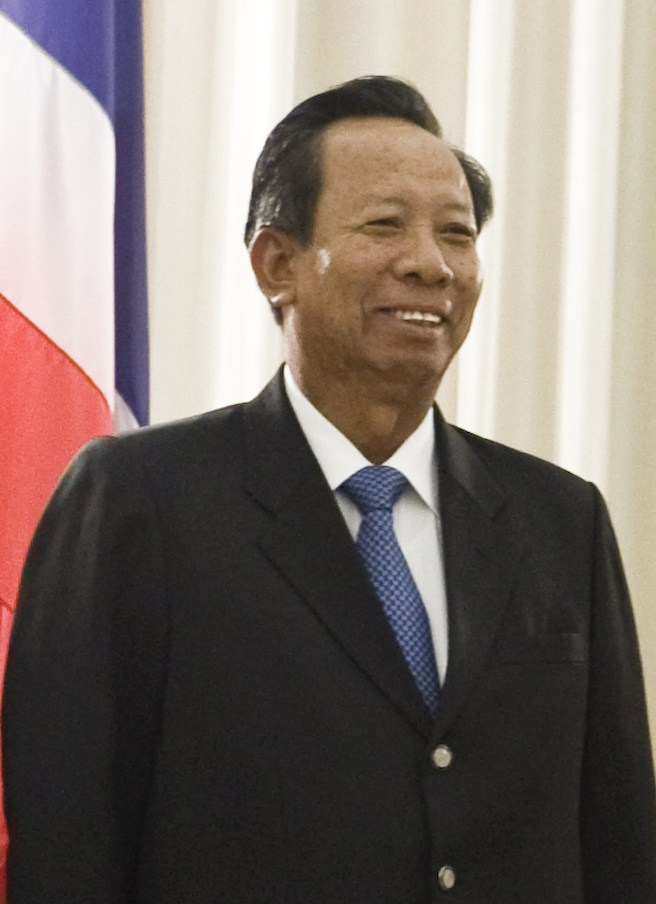
- TeaBanh

Vice President of the Cambodian People's Party
- Incumbent
- Assumed office 24 December 2021
- President: Hun Sen
- Serving with: Sar Kheng (2015–present); Say Chhum (2015–present); Men Sam An (2021–present); Hun Manet (2023-present)
- Preceded by: Hun Sen (2015)

Minister of National Defence
- In office 1987 – 22 August 2023 (Note: Co-Minister from 1993 to 2006.)
- Prime Minister: Hun Sen; Norodom Ranariddh; Ung Huot
- Preceded by: Bou Thang
- Succeeded by: Tea Seiha

Deputy Prime Minister of Cambodia
- In office 16 July 2004 – 22 August 2023
- Prime Minister: Hun Sen
Additional positions
Minister of Transport Minister of Posts and Telecommunications
In office 1982–1987
Prime Minister	Chan Sy; Hun Sen
Member of Parliament for Siem Reap
Incumbent
Assumed office 14 June 1993
Majority	52,356 (13.24%)

Personal details
- Born: Tea Sangvan; 5 November 1945 (age 80) Kampot Province, Cambodia, French Indochina
- Party: Cambodian People's Party
- Spouse: Tao Toeun (m. 1975)
- Children: Siam; Seiha
- Relatives: Tea Vinh (brother); Mithuna Phuthong (niece)
- Profession: Politician

Military service
- Allegiance: Cambodia
- Branch/service: Royal Cambodian Army
- Years of service: 1962–present
- Rank: General of the Army
- Commands: National Committee for Maritime Security
- Battles/wars: Cambodian Civil War; Cambodian–Vietnamese War

Tea Banh (Khmer: ទៀ បាញ់ Thai: เตีย บัญ [tiə ɓaɲ]; born 5 November 1945) is a Cambodian politician and general. He was a Deputy Prime Minister of Cambodia and the Minister of National Defence from 1987 until 2023. He is a former general and a member of the Cambodian People's Party and was elected to represent Siem Reap Province in the National Assembly of Cambodia in the 2003 elections. He was succeeded as defence minister by his eldest son Tea Seiha. Tea Banh was elevated to the rank of five-star general in the Royal Cambodian Armed Forces by King Norodom Sihamoni in 2025.

== Personal life ==
Banh, whose birth name was "Tea Sangvan" later changed to Thai name, Sangvan Hin-kling (Thai: สังวาลย์ หินกลิ้ง) and "Tea Banh" in last, is of Sino-Thai descent. His father, a Thai-Chinese, was named Tea Toek (Thai: เต็ก; RTGS: Tek) and his mother Nou Peng Chenda (Thai: หนู เพ่งจินดา; RTGS: Nu Phengchinda), was an ethnic Thai. Banh married Tao Toeun (Thai: เตือนใจ ธรรมเกษร; RTGS: Tueanchai Thamma-keson), who is also an ethnic Thai, in 1975. They have three children, including Tea Seiha (also spelt Tea Seyha), the current Deputy Prime Minister and Minister of Defence National Defence, and former governor of Siem Reap province. Banh's brother Tea Vinh is the commander of the Royal Cambodian Navy.

== Sports Management ==
Tea Banh was Chairman of the National Organizing Committee for the 32nd SEA Games. In 2023, Kun Khmer was added to the Southeast Asian Games Federation's charter and rules. Deputy Prime Minister Tea Banh stated that he was proud that the Southeast Asian Games officially recognized the Cambodian martial art of Kun Khmer and he worked hard to show Kun Khmer's international potential.

== Honours ==
- Cambodia:
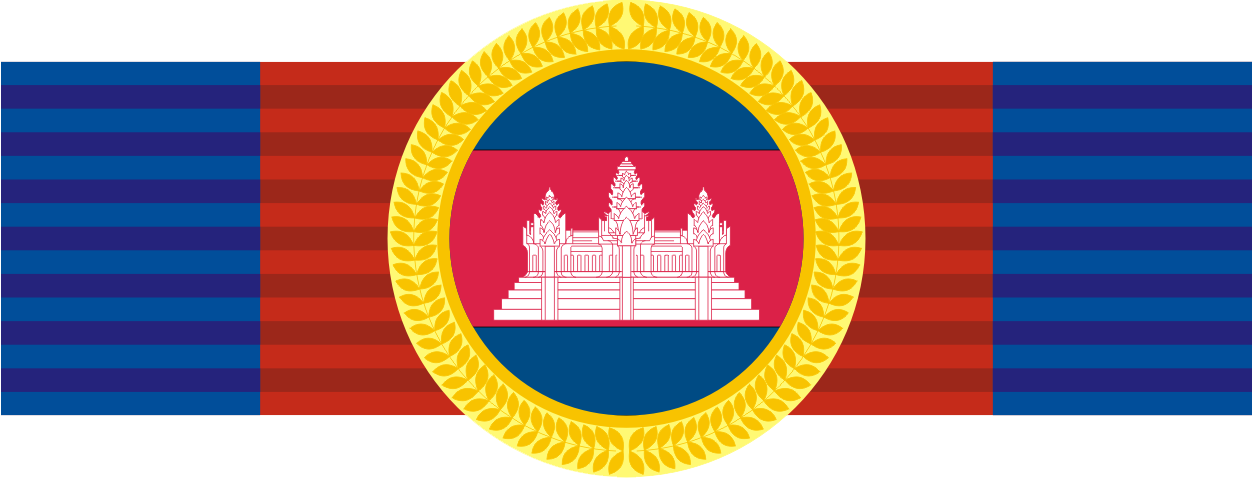
  - Collar of the Grand Order of National Merit
  - Grand Cross of the Royal Order of Cambodia
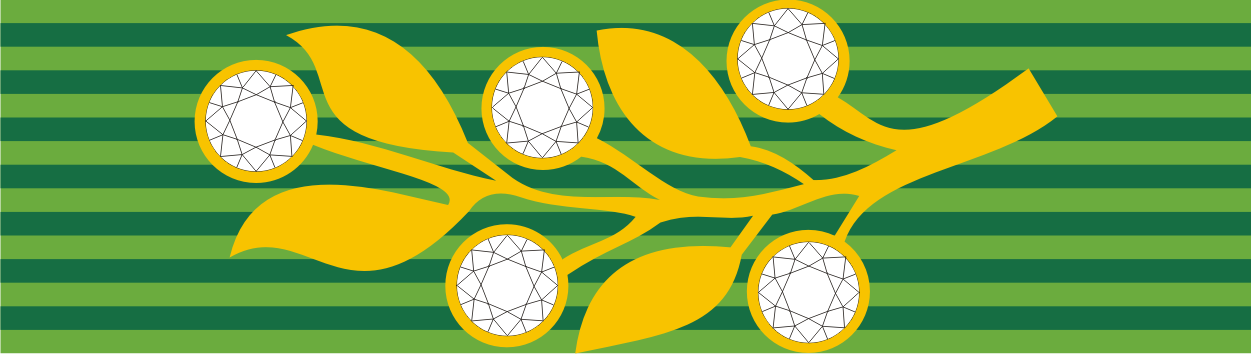
  - Grand Cross of the Royal Order of Sowathara
  - Grand Officer of the Royal Order of H.M. The Queen Preah Kossomak Nearirath
  - Recipient of the Sena Jayaseddh Medal
  - Recipient of the Medal of National Defense in gold, two stars
  - Recipient of the Medal of National Defense in silver, two stars
  - Recipient of the Medal of National Defense in bronze, two stars
  - Recipient of the Medal of Labour
  - Recipient of the Decoration of National Construction (Twice)
