= Soeung Samnang =

Cambodian air force officer

Commander of the Royal Cambodian Air Force
- Incumbent
- Assumed office 24 January 1999

Personal details
- Born: 5 August 1954 (age 70); Kampong Chhnang Province, Cambodia
- Spouse: Ou Sethiry
- Children: 3
- Education: Royal University of Phnom Penh

Military service
- Allegiance: Cambodia
- Branch/service: Royal Cambodian Air Force

Soeung Samnang is a Cambodian air force officer. He serves as Commander of the Royal Cambodian Air Force as of January 1999.

In March 2018, he was promoted to deputy commander-in-chief of the Royal Cambodian Armed Forces.
