= Tea Vinh =

Cambodian navy commander

Admiral Tea Vinh
- ទៀ វិញ
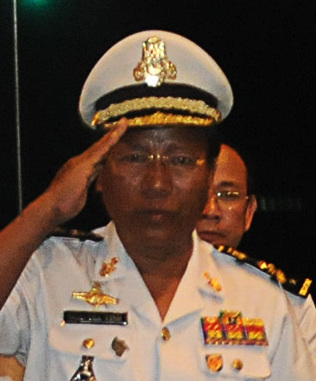
- Vinh in 2011

Commander of the Royal Cambodian Navy
- Incumbent
- Assumed office ?

Personal details
- Born: 7 January 1952 (age 74) Koh Kong, Cambodia, French Indochina
- Party: Cambodian People's Party
- Spouse: Kan Chantrea
- Children: Tier Leakhena; Tea Sokha
- Relatives: Tea Banh (brother); Mithuna Phuthong (niece)

Military service
- Allegiance: Cambodia
- Branch/service: Royal Cambodian Navy
- Rank: Admiral

Tea Vinh (Khmer: ទៀ វិញ; born 7 January 1952 in Koh Kong) is the commander of the Royal Cambodian Navy, deputy commander-in-chief of the Royal Cambodian Armed Forces, and secretary-general of the National Committee for Maritime Security. In November 2021, the United States government sanctioned Vinh for corruption, for conspiring with other Cambodian officials to personally benefit from the proceeds of projects at the Ream Naval Base.

== Personal life ==
Vinh is of Sino-Thai descent. His father, a Thai-Chinese, was named Tea Toek (Thai: เต็ก; RTGS: Tek) and his mother Nou Peng Chenda (Thai: หนู เพ่งจินดา; RTGS: Nu Phengchinda), was an ethnic Thai. Vinh is married to Kan Chantrea, and has two children, Tea Leakhena, and Tea Sokha. Vinh's brother Tea Banh is a politician.
