= Kampuchean People's Revolutionary Armed Forces =

Cambodian Army (1979–1990)

Kampuchean People's Revolutionary Armed Forces (1979–1989) កងកម្លាំងប្រដាប់អាវុធប្រជាជនបដិវត្តន៍កម្ពុជា Cambodian People's Armed Forces (1989–1993) កងយោធពលខេមរភូមិន្ទ
- Emblem

- Flag
- Founded: 1979
- Disbanded: 1993
- Service branches: Army; Navy; Air Force
- Headquarters: Phnom Penh

Leadership
- President of Kampuchea: Hun Sen
- Minister of Defence: Tea Banh
- Chief of the General Staff: Neth Savoeun

Personnel
- Military age: 18 – 35 years
- Conscription: 5 years
- Active personnel: 172,000
- Reserve personnel: 90,000

Expenditure
- Budget: n. a.
- Percent of GDP: n. a.

Industry
- Foreign suppliers: Soviet Union; Vietnam; Bulgaria; East Germany; Czechoslovakia; Romania; Hungary; Cuba; Yugoslavia

Related articles
- Ranks: Military ranks of the People's Republic of Kampuchea

The Kampuchean People's Revolutionary Armed Forces (KPRAF), also the Khmer People's Revolutionary Armed Forces were the armed forces of the People's Republic of Kampuchea (PRK), the de facto government of Cambodia 1979–1993. It was formed with military assistance from Vietnam, which furbished the fledgling armed forces with equipment and training, with the initial task of countering the sustained guerrilla campaign being waged by the Coalition Government of Democratic Kampuchea (CGDK).

After renaming the country State of Cambodia (SOC), the KPRAF were renamed the Cambodian People's Armed Forces (CPAF) in 1989, preserving their main structure, but changing ranks, insignias and symbols. In 1993, the monarchy was restored and the CPAF were absorbed into the newly re-established Royal Cambodian Armed Forces (RCAF).

== Historical background ==
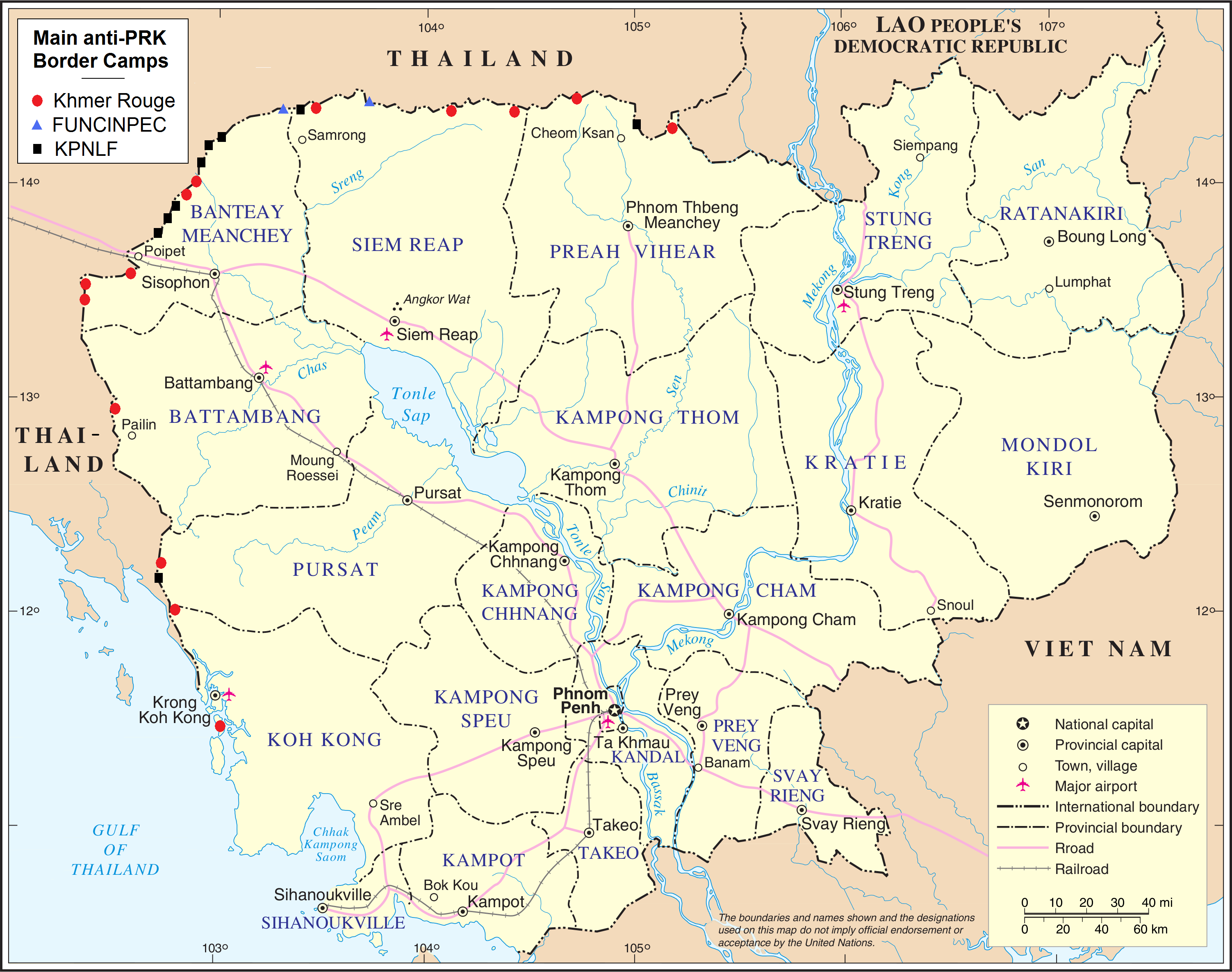
Border camps hostile to the People's Republic of Kampuchea; 1979–1984.

The KPRAF was formed initially from militias, former Khmer Rouge members, and conscripts. Most of them were trained and supplied by the Vietnam People's Army. But due to a lack of training, weapons and mass desertions, the KPRAF was not an effective fighting force. Hence the bulk of the fighting against the Coalition Government of Democratic Kampuchea (CGDK) forces, of which the Khmer Rouge (renamed the National Army of Democratic Kampuchea) was the main threat, was left to the Vietnamese armed forces occupying the country.

Following the Vietnamese withdrawal in 1989 and the collapse of the Soviet Union, the KPRAF were unable to continue their modest efforts against the CGDK and this in part convinced the Cambodian government to turn to the negotiating table. In 1989 began the transition that culminated in the 1991 Paris Peace Agreement. After the name of the "People's Republic of Kampuchea" had been officially changed to "State of Cambodia" (SOC), the KPRAF were renamed the "Cambodian People's Armed Forces" (CPAF). Following the 1993 elections the CPAF were absorbed into a new national army of Royalist, Nationalist and CPAF troops.

The Kampuchean People's Revolutionary Armed Forces (KPRAF) constituted the regular forces of the pro-Hanoi People's Republic of Kampuchea (PRK). Soon after the downfall of the Khmer Rouge, two reasons for the necessity of such forces became apparent to the PRK's Vietnamese mentors when they installed the new Cambodian government in early 1979. First, if the new administration in Phnom Penh was to project internationally the image of being a legitimate sovereign state, it would need a national army of its own apart from the Vietnamese forces.

Second, if the Vietnamese army was not to have to shoulder indefinitely its internal security mission in Cambodia, it would need to develop a Khmer military force that could be put in place as a surrogate for Vietnamese troops. Raising such an indigenous force presented no insurmountable obstacle for Hanoi at the time because several precedents already had been established. In Laos, the Vietnamese armed forces maintained a close training and coordinating relationship with their Laotian counterparts as a result of Hanoi's military presence in the country.

In Cambodia, Vietnam had been a mainstay for Khmer communist factions since 1954. The Vietnamese army also had helped train Pol Pot's RAK and its successor, the CPNLAF, following the coup that deposed Sihanouk in 1970. More recently, Hanoi had helped raise and train a few, probably battalion-sized, regiments of Khmer troops that had fought alongside the Vietnamese during the invasion of Cambodia. With further Vietnamese tutelage, these Khmer units became the nucleus of a national army. From such ad hoc beginnings, the KPRAF grew as a military force and eventually gained its position as an instrument of both the party and the state. This development, however, was carefully shielded from the scrutiny of outsiders, and much that could be concluded about the armed forces of the PRK was based on analysis rather than incontrovertible hard data.

== Threats and capabilities ==
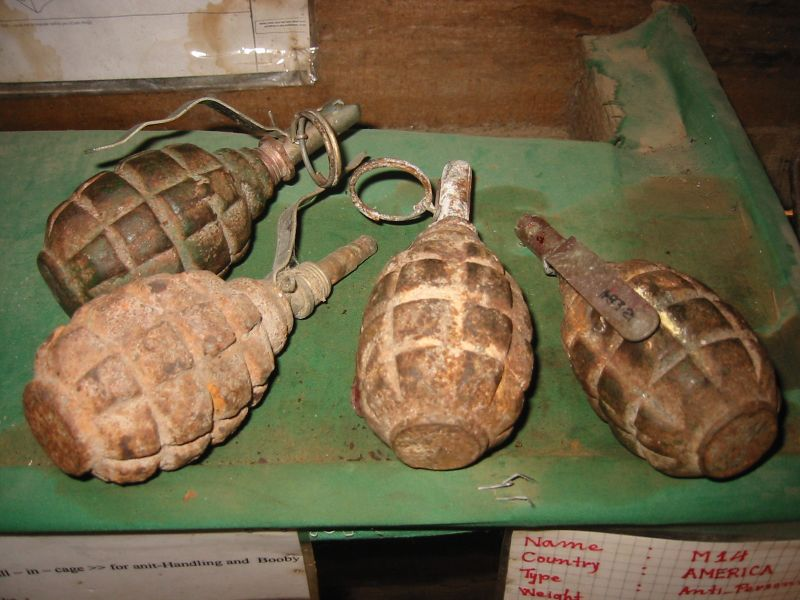
Soviet F1 hand grenades of the KPRAF.

The major impetus for the establishment of the KPRAF was the security threat faced by the government in Phnom Penh. Internally this threat consisted of the armed insurgents belonging to the three CGDK components. The total strength of the three forces was impossible to gauge with any precision; it may possibly have reached between 55,000 and 75,000 combatants, but it could have been considerably less than that figure. The insurgent forces were incapable of mounting a sustained offensive and of massing for any tactical operation beyond sporadic patrols in companies, because they could not overcome their destructive factional rivalries.

Least of all were they able to bring down the Phnom Penh government. They were capable, however, of keeping Cambodia in a permanent state of insecurity; they raised the cost to Hanoi of its large military presence in the country; and, backed by China, they offered a persistent obstacle to the coalescence of an Hanoi-dominated Indochinese federation.

In addition to the Khmer insurgents in Cambodia itself, the KPRAF and the Phnom Penh government felt that they faced a substantial external menace as well that consisted of the numerically superior Royal Thai Army, supplied by China, the United States, and Thailand, which played host to legions of Khmer guerrillas who crossed the border to prey on KPRAF units and on PRK assets at will. To what extent this perception was realistic was a disputable point. Bangkok did acquiesce to the presence on Thai soil of Khmer refugee camps, which the insurgents used for rest and recuperation.

The Thai Army, however, was neither massed nor deployed in an especially threatening posture along the border with Cambodia; moreover, the resistance that the Thai could have offered to a hypothetical Vietnamese offensive into Thailand was the subject of legitimate speculation. Phnom Penh's denunciations of alleged Thai bellicosity were made with such regularity, however, that it was possible that the KPRAF (and the PRK) stood in some danger of being the victims of their own propaganda concerning Bangkok's aggressive intentions.

A lesser, but nevertheless real, threat was posed by the possibility of unauthorized landings along Cambodia's irregular and unprotected coastline. Chinese vessels could exploit this vulnerability by putting in at secluded coves and inlets uncontrolled by the KPRAF, and there they could unload arms and supplies for the insurgents. In 1987 this threat was not decisive, but it had the potential to become so, if the network of obstacles and minefields emplaced on the Cambodian border proved to be an unexpectedly effective barrier in impeding the flow of Chinese supplies to the Khmer guerrillas.

Along its northeastern and eastern borders with Laos and with Vietnam, Cambodia faced no noteworthy external security threat. As long as friendly communist governments remained in power in Vientiane, Phnom Penh, and Hanoi, their interests in protecting the inviolability of their common frontiers converged. In spite of this, however, government control in the upland border areas of all three states probably was tenuous, and insurgent (or bandit) groups, if not too large, could pass back and forth unhindered. The security threat posed by such bands was vexatious but minor, and, in the case of Cambodia, it could probably be contained by the provincial units without requiring the intervention of the KPRAF or of Vietnamese main forces.

The capability of the KPRAF to meet the threats, real or perceived, arrayed against it in 1987 was open to question. Western observers, in consensus, rated the forces of the Phnom Penh government as generally ineffectual, possessed of only a limited capability for any combat mission. In their view, the KPRAF was overstretched and understaffed and could neither cope with the sustained guerrilla activity of the CGDK insurgents, nor prevent their infiltration into Cambodia from Thailand, nor patrol the country's extended coastline. In the face of such limitations, it was necessary to acknowledge, nevertheless, that the KPRAF had been built literally from nothing in a war-torn and devastated country, the population of which had been decimated previously by a brutal dictatorship.

The establishment in the space of a few years, of a credible force under such circumstances would have been a daunting task for any government, let alone one so deprived of resources and of leadership and so dependent upon external support. The most conclusive analysis that could be made about the KPRAF was that Hanoi had laid the foundation for an indigenous Cambodian military force and, by its recurrent insistence that Vietnamese units would be withdrawn by 1990, may have imparted to its clients in the Phnom Penh government a certain degree of urgency in regard to developing an effective force.

== Organization and control ==
=== Legal structure ===
The establishment of a legal and a bureaucratic structure for the armed forces was concurrent with the founding of the KPRAF. The legal basis was found in the Constitution of the PRK, which went through several versions before being adopted by the National Assembly in 1981 (see The Constitution, ch. 4). Article 9 of the Constitution acknowledges the existence of the KPRAF and notes that its obligation is "to defend the fatherland and the revolutionary power, safeguard the revolutionary gains and the peaceful life of the people and join with the latter in national construction." The Constitution also imposes a reciprocal obligation on the people, declaring that it is their "supreme duty and honor" to "build and defend the fatherland", and that all citizens without respect to gender "must serve in the armed forces as prescribed by law".

In an early draft, the Constitution had specified that the chairman of the Council of State was concurrently the supreme commander of the armed forces and the chairman of the National Defense Council. In a curious deviation from the initial draft, however, the definitive version of the Constitution omitted this key passage. Its omission provoked speculation about the true locus of authority over the KPRAF and fueled suspicions that the deletion could have been related to the relief, under murky circumstances, of then-chairman and armed forces head Pen Sovan. In 1987, however, supreme command of the KPRAF was vested once again in the chairmanship of the Council of State.

The KPRAF was answerable to two organizations below the Council of State, namely, the Ministry of National Defense and the General Staff. The minister of national defense, a position established sometime in 1979, was a member of the Council of Ministers, the executive body empowered by the Constitution "to consolidate and develop the national defense forces; to carry out the mobilization of the armed forces; to order curfews and take other necessary measures for national defense." To carry out his duties, the minister of national defense was assisted by four deputies who oversaw, in 1987, the work of at least nine departments (see fig. 14). The incomplete evidence available in 1987 suggested that functions such as administration, operations, and logistics, normally reserved for general staff sections in some armed forces, were carried out at the Ministry of National Defense level.

=== General Staff ===
Below the Ministry of National Defense, the General Staff was the second echelon concerned with defense and security matters in the PRK. It was one of the earliest KPRAF organs to be established and was already in place by mid-1979. In 1986 it was headed by a chief of general staff, with a secretariat and four deputies, all of whose responsibilities remained obscure. The General Staff exercised jurisdiction over the three components of the KPRAF: the ground force (army), and the embryonic coastal/riverine naval force and air force. It probably oversaw administratively the country's military regions and certain specialized commands, such as the Signals and Special Warfare Command.

It may have exercised operational control over some KPRAF tactical formations as well, especially those operating autonomously, apart from Vietnamese forces. The lines of authority delimiting General Staff responsibilities from Ministry of National Defense responsibilities appeared to be more blurred than in some contemporary armies. This may not have caused jurisdictional disputes, however, because, with the paucity of military leadership, key officers sometimes served concurrently in both bodies.

=== Party control ===
Control of the KPRAF military establishment and its adherence to the political orthodoxy of the Kampuchea (or Khmer) People's Revolutionary Party (KPRP) were ensured by a party network, superimposed upon the national defense structure, that extended downward to units at all echelons. Party control of the armed forces also was exercised by the assignment of senior officers to top-echelon military and party positions with, for example, key Ministry of National Defense or General Staff officers also serving on the KPRP Central Committee.

At the national level, supervision of party work in the armed forces was entrusted to the General Political Department of the Ministry of National Defense. Incomplete evidence suggested the presence, among the country's regional military commands, of political officers with small staffs or commissions at their disposal. Logically, such officers would have kept in close contact and would have coordinated party activities in their military jurisdictions with their counterparts in KPRAF tactical units and on party provincial committees.

During the 1980s, party activity in the KPRAF focused on building support for the "socialist revolution" in Cambodia, and on increasing membership in all military units. In late 1984, party goals were to establish a committee in each regiment of the provincial forces, as well as a party cell or chapter in each battalion and in each company at the district level. This endeavor reportedly had achieved partial success by mid-1985. In a relentless effort to build party membership in the KPRAF, cadres at all echelons over the years have been urged to spot capable military personnel with potential and to induct them quickly into the party.

Such appeals hinted that for KPRAF members, the trial or waiting period for party acceptance was waived, and that even the act of joining may not have been completely voluntary. KPRP officials also sought to expand membership by junior officers and by KPRAF rank and file in the People's Revolutionary Youth Union of Kampuchea (PRYUK—see Appendix B). As the party's mass organization to which all young people could belong, the PRYUK was in a strong institutional position to accept all applicants, and it could make deeper inroads into the KPRAF than the more elitist party. In an exhortatory message in early 1987, defense officials proudly noted the existence of PRYUK "structures" in more than 80 percent of the armed forces, and they acknowledged a debt of gratitude to the mass organization for occupying the forefront of a national effort to induce Khmer youth to serve in the KPRAF.

=== Suppression of factionalism ===
When considering the dynamics of the KPRAF, the possibility of factionalism should at least be considered. In some armies, this factionalism may take the form of interservice rivalry, of the coalescence of groups around certain leaders, or of shared commonalities, such as military schooling, unit affiliation, or combat experience. In the case of the KPRAF, it is unlikely that such factionalism existed. Vietnamese advisers, for example, present at all KPRAF echelons, would have detected such activity at an early stage and would have suppressed it promptly, because it would have detracted from the building of an effective Khmer fighting force, which it was the Vietnamese army's mission to develop.

Interservice rivalry also could be dismissed as a cause of factionalism in the KPRAF for the time being. The ground forces clearly were the dominant service both by size and by seniority. The coastal/riverine naval force and the air force were newly established; very small in numbers, they were not in a position to challenge the primacy of the larger service, despite the possibility of some elitism engendered by their more technical orientation.

The composition of the KPRAF officer corps also militated against the rise of factionalism. As members of a comparatively small armed force, the officers were relatively few in number and were subject to a system of rotational assignments, which bred familiarity with a variety duties. The consequent personnel interchangeability presumably prevented the creation of warlord fiefs and the development of inordinate personal loyalties within the military establishment. As is true of the military elite in other small, undeveloped countries, KPRAF officers were personally known to one another, and they were thoroughly acquainted with one another's family and political antecedents. This network of personal and family relationships, always important in Asia, may have fostered a spirit of cooperation rather than competitiveness; moreover, the ubiquity—the perhaps even suffocating presence—of Vietnamese military advisers also may have been sufficient inducement for Khmer personnel to submerge whatever differences existed among them.

The final factor that may have inhibited the rise of factions within the KPRAF was the range of options available to its dissident officers and to its enlisted troops. Unlike the armed forces in other Third World countries, where disaffected military personnel had little choice but to plot coups or to swallow their resentments, KPRAF personnel could (and many did) simply walk away from their military commitments and join the anti-Vietnamese insurgents, which had policies of welcoming KRAF defectors. If they exercised this option, they had an additional choice: they could join the communist NADK, the nationalist KPNLAF, or the royalist ANS.

For the armed forces of the Phnom Penh government, this range of options meant that those personnel who remained in the KPRAF did so voluntarily because of common purpose and loyalty to the institution or the regime. Although in the short term this dynamic may have had a purgative effect on the KPRAF, ensuring its ideological purity, it was based on Khmer acquiescence to the continued Vietnamese domination of the PRK and of its armed forces. Whether or not continued acceptance of this domination would long prevail in the face of Khmer nationalism among military personnel remained debatable.

Although logic might argue against the existence of factions in the KPRAF, the case is not entirely one-sided. It could be noted, after all, that Cambodia since 1970 has been subjected to cataclysmic events that have produced deep cleavages within Khmer society and that may well have been reflected in the armed forces themselves. In the KPRAF, even among personnel who had chosen not to join the insurgents, it was possible to note a variety of backgrounds; there were ex-Khmer Rouge turncoats, Vietnamese supporters, former royalists, and a younger generation of junior officers and of men without political antecedents.

Although it could not be proved by outside observers, it could be inferred that factions in the KPRAF might have coalesced around such shared former political loyalties, affiliations, or backgrounds. If this were the case, such coalescence could take several forms in the future: either there could be a hardening of factional lines as the KPRAF itself becomes more entrenched as an institution of the PRK, or as stated at the outset, Vietnam, in its role of mentor to the armed forces of the Phnom Penh government, could keep a tight rein on the KPRAF and could forcibly prevent its polarization around internal factions.

== Mission and doctrine ==
In the late 1980s, the KPRAF had several missions. Some were implicit in Cambodia's situation; others were prescribed in the Constitution. Foremost were the duties to defend the nation from foreign aggression, to safeguard the gains of the Marxist revolution in Cambodia, and to ensure domestic security by engaging in combat against insurgents and against domestic foes as determined by the government and the party. In addition to the combat role that was part of their internal security responsibilities, the KPRAF also engaged in propaganda activity on behalf of the government, performed various civic action tasks, and participated in economic production.

Because of the poverty of the country, and because the defense budget was not sufficient to meet KPRAF's needs, the KPRAF had to help pay its own way by generating income. In the 1980s, its efforts were limited to growing vegetables and raising poultry and livestock for military use, but, in the future, they could include manufacturing commodities and processing raw materials in military-owned factories.

To accomplish its combat missions, the KPRAF developed its own military doctrine. Although not available in written form to Western observers, this doctrine could be inferred from the Constitution, from the circumstances in Cambodia, and from the dynamics of the Vietnamese military establishment which had acted as mentor and as role model for the KPRAF from its inception. In both the KPRAF and the Vietnamese army there was no doctrinal dichotomy between civilian society and the military establishment as there is in most Western nations.

Everyone was potentially a member of the armed forces; in Cambodia as in Vietnam, there were total mobilization of the population and total dedication of whatever resources the nation could muster in order to achieve the military goals the government or the party wished to formulate. The total involvement of the Cambodian population in warfare was enshrined doctrinally in the constitutional statement that "the people as a whole participate in national defense." Because of the security imperatives faced by the Phnom Penh government in fighting a persistent insurgency, virtually the entire able-bodied population was organized into various military and paramilitary bodies.

This doctrinal concept worked well defensively when patriotism could be invoked to rally a population against a foreign invader or against a real or fancied, but easily understood, external threat. It worked less well when used to rally indigenous support for a foreign occupier, as the Phnom Penh regime had to do for Vietnam. Hanoi, therefore, incessantly evoked the specter of the return of Pol Pot and the Khmer Rouge to induce the Cambodian population to join the KPRAF, and through active personal involvement, to render unflinching support to the PRK.

The KPRAF probably was also subject to other doctrinal influences from the military establishments of Vietnam and, ultimately, the Soviet Union, which maintained a substantial advisory presence with the Vietnamese armed forces and a smaller one with the KPRAF. The relevance of the military doctrine of the large armies of the Soviet Union and of Vietnam to the small, questionably trained and equipped KPRAF remained speculative, however, especially in the counterinsurgency environment of Cambodia.

Soviet advisers, directly or through Vietnamese counterparts, may have relayed their experiences in Afghanistan and they may have advised on measures for countering Chinese or Western equipment and weapons, on methods of controlling or suborning the population, and on means of employing weapons and weapons systems—such as artillery, helicopters, and land mines. Vietnamese advisers, focusing on their army's neutralization of insurgent base camps on the Thai border — through large-scale operations supported by indirect fire — in the dry season offensive of 1984 and 1985, may have unwittingly imparted to their Cambodian understudies a predilection for this tactical doctrine.

== Composition and deployment ==
=== Military regions ===
Cambodia was divided geographically into four KPRAF military regions (see fig. 15). These regions originally bore numbers assigned by the Vietnamese to conform to the system used by the People's Army of Vietnam (PAVN—see Appendix B). In the mid-1980s they were renumbered to present, at least, the illusion, of their autonomy from the Vietnamese armed forces. Little was known conclusively about the functions of the military regions, especially about the operational control exercised by their headquarters over KPRAF tactical units and missions. It was possible that their responsibilities were restricted to administrative tasks, such as conscription, training, economic production, and coordination with Vietnamese military units and advisers.

Below the level of military region headquarters, the KPRAF was composed of three types of units: main or regular forces, provincial or regional forces, and village militia or local forces. Official strength figures were lacking in 1987, but the main and provincial forces together may have numbered more than 40,000 troops. It was the intention of the KPRAF's Vietnamese mentors to build a reliable Khmer force of between 30,000 and 50,000 personnel, presumably by about 1990, by which date Vietnamese units were to be withdrawn.

=== Units ===
In the mid-to-late 1980s, KPRAF regular or main force units consisted of seven understrength infantry divisions, several independent infantry brigades and regiments, as many as four tank battalions, and combat support formations, such as engineer battalions. The forerunners of all these units were several Khmer battalions raised by Hanoi in 1978 as it prepared for the invasion of Cambodia. In approximately 1980, the battalions were reorganized into four brigades, each one posted to one of the four Cambodian provinces of Battambang, Siem Reap-Oddar Meanchey, Kampong Speu, and Kampong Cham.

In these areas the brigades performed static defense tasks and they occasionally participated with Vietnamese forces in joint operations against the insurgents. As conscription and voluntary enlistments brought more personnel into the KPRAF, the four brigades were upgraded to infantry divisions, and two additional divisions were founded. In spite of such apparent progress in force development, however, all units remained chronically understrength, according to Western observers.

In the mid-to-late-1980s, KPRAF authorities deployed much of their main force strength semipermanently in western Cambodia, and division headquarters were reported to have been established in Batdambang City, in Treng, and in Sisophon in Batdambang Province. There was little agreement among observers on unit designations or on the movements of main force units below division level within Cambodia, or on the extent to which such Khmer units were able to operate independently of Vietnamese forces.

To extend the government presence to the districts, some provincial units were broken down into platoons or squads and were dispatched to accompany newly appointed district officials. At this time, the provincial forces were merely adjuncts of the Vietnamese occupation forces; they were untrained, and they had few capabilities beyond those needed to provide rudimentary passive defense to their provincial or district administrations.

=== Deployment ===
In 1987 little authoritative information was available on the deployment and the total strength of the Cambodian provincial forces. If the KPRAF followed the examples of its Vietnamese and Laotian counterparts, however, troops for provincial units were raised from among local residents and were deployed exclusively in their home provinces. Such practices may have given these forces an edge, in recruitment and in morale, over their main force counterparts because village youths generally preferred to serve their military obligation closer to home. In a counter-insurgency like the one in Cambodia, provincial forces also could have had an advantage because of their greater knowledge of the area of operations and of local conditions, both friendly and hostile.

An early goal of the government in Phnom Penh was to raise two battalions of provincial forces per province. Given the manpower limitations of the nation, a more realistic goal would have been a single battalion per province. In 1987 Western analysts believed that the latter goal had been achieved and had even been exceeded in some provinces on the Thai border, where the insurgent threat was greatest. It continued to be impossible to gauge the overall strength of the provincial forces with any accuracy, but based on an estimate of 1 battalion per province in general, with 2 to 4 battalions per border province, a figure of 10,000 personnel may have been realistic.

=== Connections ===
The connections among the provincial forces and the Ministry of National Defense and the KPRAF General Staff were unclear. At subordinate echelons, however, provincial units were responsible to a local military committee. This committee was composed of the chairman, the military commander and his deputy, and a small staff headed by a chief of staff.

The military committee reported to the provincial committee of the mass organization of the KPRP, the Kampuchea (or Khmer) United Front for National Construction and Defense (KUFNCD—see Appendix B). The KUFNCD coordinated military affairs with the corresponding party and government committees at each organizational level. It was assumed, although unproved, that the provincial forces, irrespective of intervening committees, kept in close touch with KPRAF main force units and headquarters, and with Vietnamese military garrisons in the vicinity.

=== Missions ===
The provincial forces had two missions, military and political. In the performance of the former, some Western analysts hypothesized that the provincial units at last might have broken their dependency on their Vietnamese military mentors and have learned to operate by themselves. This premise might hold true if the provincial forces were deployed only in their home provinces, as suspected, and if the insurgents continued to be unable to mass large units. In the performance of their political mission, the provincial forces were expected by the government to play an important role because they were closer to the people than were the regular forces. This role included both propaganda work and psychological warfare.

- Propaganda work involved building the loyalty of provincial residents both to government and to party as well as indoctrination in KPRP orthodoxy and in Marxist–Leninist ideology.
- Psychological warfare involved measures taken against the enemy, such as inducements to defect, arousal of hatred against them, and neutralization of their propaganda appeals.

=== Village militia ===
The third echelon in the KPRAF consisted of the village militia, or local forces. This armed force originated in the 1979 to 1980 period, when directives by the party and the newly proclaimed government mandated the raising of a militia in each village and subdistrict. This objective coincided with the desire of the Vietnamese military authorities to create small local force units in the rural communities along the Thai-Cambodian border, thereby transforming these frontier settlements into combat hamlets that would help to keep the insurgents at bay.

According to instructions relayed to village authorities, former officials and soldiers of the defunct Democratic Kampuchea regime were to be excluded from the militia, and preference was to be given to recruiting former Khmer Rouge victims. This recruitment policy initially was quite successful, as there was no dearth of Cambodians who had either grievances against the previous regime or the simple desire to protect their homes and their villages from attack by Khmer Rouge guerrillas.

In some localities, former soldiers of the Khmer Republic who had escaped the purges of Democratic Kampuchea were able to dominate the militia. In others, local peasants without political antecedents were in the majority. Villages were able eventually to raise militia forces of ten to twenty personnel each, while subdistricts mustered fifteen to thirty personnel. In virtually all cases, militia members were ill- trained and ill-equipped, possessing only Soviet small arms from Vietnam, or hand-me-down United States weapons provided years before to the Khmer Republic.

In the mid-to-late 1980s, party and military authorities were attempting to consolidate the militia. Indirect evidence suggested that, among the Cambodian citizenry, enthusiasm for joining the local forces had waned considerably since the early years of the decade. Militia units were formed throughout the country, nevertheless, even in the hamlets, in the individual factories, and in the solidarity groups working in the rice fields, in some cases. Some units had offensive missions to search out guerrilla bands in their localities and to destroy them, or at least to report their movement to higher military authorities.

On the Thai border, the militia participated in Project K-5. The militia also had the duties of patrolling and protecting this barrier. Away from the frontier, however, the local forces generally were oriented defensively and, according to official Cambodian sources, were "entrusted with the duty of defending production, communication lines, production sites, rubber plantations, fishing grounds, forest exploitation areas, and so on." In all of their duties, the militia units reported to local party and government committees, which in turn were responsible for the recruitment, indoctrination, and training of militia members.

Some financial support from the central government, however, may have been available to local authorities to raise militia units within their jurisdictions. In addition to their military and security duties, militia members were expected to participate in economically productive activities and to make their units as self-sufficient as possible.

=== Navy ===
Aside from the three levels of the KPRAF that were essentially ground forces, the military establishment included a small riverine and coastal navy. This latter force consisted of one battalion, of undisclosed strength, which had the mission of patrolling the Tonlé Sap (Great Lake) and the Tonle Sab—a river emanating from the Tonle Sap—between the lake and Phnom Penh. To accomplish its mission, the riverine navy was equipped with at least three patrol craft, each armed with turret-mounted 75mm guns and with twin open- mounted 20mm guns.

The force possessed at least one landing craft with a modest lift capability of about one platoon at a time. The commander of the riverine navy served concurrently on the KPRAF General Staff, where he may have performed the functions of a naval chief of staff.

=== Air force ===
An embryonic air defense corps or air force was being reconstituted in the mid-to-late 1980s, after having been almost defunct since the days of the Khmer Republic. Cambodian pilots and technicians were in training in the Soviet Union; some already had returned home.

== Conditions of service ==
=== Conscription ===
Military service was compulsory in the People's Republic of Kampuchea. Cambodian males between the ages of eighteen and thirty-five faced an obligation to serve in the armed forces for five years, an increase from three years was made in 1985 because of personnel shortages in the country. Recruitment councils made up of party and government officials existed at all administrative levels; they may have performed functions, principally the selection of eligible youths to be inducted into the military services, similar to those of local United States Selective Service Boards.

The establishment of these recruitment councils may have supplanted the earlier press-gang tactics of KPRAF units who, according to refugee accounts, had forcibly rounded up Khmer youths and had inducted them en masse into the armed forces. In spite of this bureaucratic innovation, draft dodging was reported to be widespread, a situation that was acknowledged obliquely by the government and party media in their unrelenting emphasis on recruitment and on the patriotic duty of serving in the armed forces. It was not known whether or not Khmer youths themselves could elect to serve in the main, provincial, or local force, or whether or not a quota system prevailed.

Women as well as men were eligible for military service. A party organ reported authoritatively in the early 1980s that the KPRAF was composed of "cadres and male and female combatants", and "our people's sons and daughters". Women were heavily represented in the local forces, according to official disclosures, which stated that in 1987 more than 28,000 were enrolled in militia units and that more than 1,200 had participated in the construction of frontier fortifications on the Thai-Cambodian border. The presence of women in the provincial and in the main forces, however, could not be verified.

=== Training facilities ===
The KPRAF, with the aid of its Vietnamese and Soviet advisers, made a considerable effort to establish a network of military schools and training centers for its personnel. In the early 1980s, about thirteen such institutions were reported to be already in existence. Two of the better known schools in Phnom Penh were the Engineering School and the Technical School. Each of these schools enrolled about 300 students, in curricula lasting one year. The Engineering School, located in the former Cambodian military academy, offered courses in radio, telecommunications, topography, map reading, mechanics, and civil and military engineering.

Successful completion of courses at the Engineering School qualified graduates for the Technical School (not to be confused with the civilian Kampuchea-USSR Friendship Technical Institute). The Technical School offered military science subjects, such as weapons and tactics, a higher level than those given by the Engineering School. Both institutions offered language instruction in Vietnamese and in Russian as well as heavy doses of ideology. In Phnom Penh, there also was an Infantry School, presumably for junior officers in the KPRAF; a Political School to train party cadre for the armed forces; a military medical school; and a school for logistics.

Promising graduates of the KPRAF school system had the chance to go abroad for further military education. In the mid-1980s, about 1,000 KPRAF officers had been sent to schools and to training centers in Vietnam, and an additional 500 were being trained in the Soviet Union. This international military education and training program, as well as the entire network of service schools, was believed to be administered by the Training Department of the KPRAF General Staff, which issued specialized training directives in the name of the Ministry of National Defense to subordinate echelons down to the local force level.

Below national level, each KPRAF military region had its own training schools, and Cambodian youths who joined the armed forces were believed to receive their initial military training in such institutions. Instruction reportedly covered political, military, tactical, and vocational subjects. According to a training directive issued in 1984, provincial and local forces were ordered to stress unit training and to vary these instructions with actual combat patrols and operations. Local commanders also were directed to conduct drills for cadres and combatants, to arrange for training areas and materials, to select qualified training officers, to develop training schedules, and to select personnel for course enrollment.

=== Allowances ===
Recent data on pay and allowances in the KPRAF were lacking. In the early 1980s, military salaries for common soldiers amounted to the riel (for the value of the riel—see Glossary) equivalent of three to four dollars a month. This was supplemented by a rice ration of sixteen to twenty-two kilograms a month, supplied at the concessionary rate of one riel per kilogram. Local commanders at all echelons were enjoined to ensure the timely distribution of pay and of rations to all personnel under their jurisdiction.

Soldiers in permanent garrisons were expected to supplement their meager salaries by planting individual or unit vegetable gardens and by raising poultry or livestock wherever possible. On the home front, the care of veterans and of military dependents whose sponsors were away on active service was decentralized and entrusted to the solidarity groups (Krom Samaki) and to various party and government committees at the local level.

=== Military justice ===
A system of military justice existed in the KPRAF, but its functional details were unknown. The Constitution provides for military tribunals, and the KPRAF maintained a network of military prisons. At the national level, the principal military prison was T-1, located in the Tuol Sleng area of Phnom Penh. Administrators of T-1 reported to the Ministry of National Defense. Other military prisons existed in the four military regions of the KPRAF, and possibly at the provincial level as well. Military police of the KPRAF served as guards and as administrators of the military penal system.

== Equipment ==
The KPRAF utilized equipment from a wide variety of sources, drawing heavily on second-hand arms donated by Vietnam or the Soviet Union. Information on the quantity and type of arms and ammunition in service with the KPRAF was impossible to verify for a number of years, owing to the country's internal instability. The standard service rifle of the KPRAF was the AKM. Artillery units were typically equipped with BM-21 Grad or BM-14 multiple rocket launchers, and 130mm M1954/M46 or 122mm 2A18/D-30 howitzers. They also possessed fifteen towed T-12 anti-tank guns.

The KPRAF maintained a formidable arsenal of older Soviet main battle tanks. Tanks were typically operated and maintained on the battalion level and included a hundred T-55s, ten T-54s, and fifty obsolete PT-76s. All of these were second-hand and received as military aid from the Soviet government between 1983 and 1989. Some units were also known to have deployed Chinese Type 59s, which were probably transferred to the KPRAF by Vietnam. Other Soviet or Vietnamese-supplied armored vehicles in the KPRAF's inventory consisted of BTR-40, BTR-152, and BTR-60 wheeled armored personnel carriers, and ten BMP-1 infantry fighting vehicles. Combat aircraft consisted of Mikoyan-Gurevich MiG-21 multirole fighters as well as a fleet of Mil Mi-8 helicopters.

=== Infantry weapons ===
| Name | Origin | Notes |
Semi-automatic pistols
| TT pistol | Soviet Union | Supplied by Vietnam and the Soviet Union. |
| Makarov pistol | Soviet Union | Supplied by Vietnam and the Soviet Union. |
Semi-automatic rifles
| SKS | Soviet Union | Supplied by Vietnam and the Soviet Union. |
Assault Rifles
| AK-47 | Soviet Union | Supplied by Vietnam and the Soviet Union. |
| AKM | Soviet Union | Supplied by Vietnam and the Soviet Union. |
| M-16A1 | United States | Captured from LAK during the Cambodian–Vietnamese War. |
Light machine guns
| RPD | Soviet Union | Supplied by Vietnam and the Soviet Union. |
| RPK | Soviet Union | Supplied by Vietnam and the Soviet Union. |
Heavy machine guns
| DShK | Soviet Union | Supplied by Vietnam and the Soviet Union. |
General-purpose machine guns
| PKM | Soviet Union | Supplied by Vietnam and the Soviet Union. |
| M84 | Yugoslavia | Supplied by Yugoslavia. |
Rocket-propelled grenades
| RPG-2 | Soviet Union | Supplied by Vietnam and the Soviet Union. |
| RPG-7 | Soviet Union | Supplied by Vietnam and the Soviet Union. |
Man-portable air-defense systems
| 9K32 Strela-2 | Soviet Union | Supplied by the Soviet Union. |

=== Armored fighting vehicles ===
| Name | Origin | Quantity | Notes |
Main battle tanks
| T-54 | Soviet Union | 10 | Supplied by Vietnam and the Soviet Union. |
| T-55 | Soviet Union | 115 | Supplied by Vietnam and the Soviet Union. |
Light tanks
| Type 62 | China | 20 | Captured from LAK during the Cambodian–Vietnamese War. Some Type-62 was refurbished by Vietnam after captured them from the Khmer Rouge. |
| Type 63 | China | ~10 | Captured from LAK during the Cambodian–Vietnamese War. Some Type-62 was refurbished by Vietnam after captured them from the Khmer Rouge. |
| PT-76 | Soviet Union | 50 | Supplied by the Soviet Union. |
Infantry fighting vehicles
| BMP-1 | Soviet Union | 10 | Supplied by the Soviet Union. |
Armored personnel carriers
| BTR-60 | Soviet Union | 40 | Supplied by the Soviet Union. |
| M113 | United States | ~200 | Captured from LAK during the Cambodian–Vietnamese War. |

=== Artillery ===
| Name | Origin | Caliber | Quantity | Notes |
Mortars
| M-37 | Soviet Union | 82mm | Unknown | Supplied by Vietnam and the Soviet Union. |
| M1943 | Soviet Union | 120mm | Unknown | Supplied by Vietnam and the Soviet Union. |
Recoilless rifles
| M20 | United States | 75mm | Unknown | Captured from LAK during the Cambodian–Vietnamese War. |
| M40 | United States | 105mm | Unknown | Captured from LAK during the Cambodian–Vietnamese War. |
| B-10 | Soviet Union | 82mm | Unknown | Supplied by the Soviet Union. |
| B-11 | Soviet Union | 107mm | Unknown | Supplied by the Soviet Union. |
Anti-tank guns
| ZiS-3 | Soviet Union | 76mm | 10 | Captured from LAK during the Cambodian–Vietnamese War. |
| T-12 | Soviet Union | 100mm | 15 | Supplied by the Soviet Union. |
Howitzers
| M101 | United States | 105mm | ~20 | Captured from LAK during the Cambodian–Vietnamese War. |
| M114 | United States | 155mm | ~10 | Captured from LAK during the Cambodian–Vietnamese War. |
| M-30 | Soviet Union | 122mm | 10 | Captured from LAK during the Cambodian–Vietnamese War. |
| D-30 | Soviet Union | 122mm | 10 | Supplied by Vietnam and the Soviet Union. |
| M46 | Soviet Union | 130mm | 30 | Supplied by Vietnam and the Soviet Union. |
Multiple rocket launchers
| BM-13 | Soviet Union | 132mm | ~10 | Supplied by the Soviet Union. |
| BM-14 | Soviet Union | 140mm | 10 | Supplied by the Soviet Union. |
| BM-21 | Soviet Union | 122mm | 10 | Supplied by the Soviet Union. |

==== Anti-aircraft artillery ====
| Name | Origin | Caliber | Quantity | Notes |
Anti-aircraft guns
| ZPU | Soviet Union | 14.5mm | 30 | Supplied by Vietnam and the Soviet Union. |
| ZU-23-2 | Soviet Union | 23 mm | 30 | Supplied by Vietnam and the Soviet Union. |
| 61-K | Soviet Union | 37mm | 30 | Supplied by Vietnam and the Soviet Union. |
| S-60 | Soviet Union | 57mm | 10 | Supplied by Vietnam and the Soviet Union. |
Surface-to-air missiles
| SA-3/S-125 | Soviet Union | | 36 | Supplied by the Soviet Union. |

=== Aircraft ===
| Aircraft | Origin | Quantity | Notes |
Fighter aircraft
| Shenyang J-6C | China | 5 | Captured from LAK during the Cambodian–Vietnamese War. |
| MiG-21Bis | Soviet Union | 19 | Supplied by the Soviet Union until all were retired in 2010. |
Trainer aircraft
| AU-24A Stallion | United States | 1 | Captured from LAK during the Cambodian–Vietnamese War. |
| MiG-21UM | Soviet Union | 3 | Supplied by the Soviet Union. |
Transports
| Douglas C-47 | United States | 1 | Captured from LAK during the Cambodian–Vietnamese War. |
| An-24 | Soviet Union | 3 | Supplied by the Soviet Union. |
| Tu-134 | Soviet Union | 2 | Supplied by the Soviet Union. |
Utility helicopters
| Bell UH-1H/1G | United States | 10 | Captured from LAK during the Cambodian–Vietnamese War. |
| Mil Mi-8 | Soviet Union | 8 | Supplied by the Soviet Union. |
| Mil Mi-17 | Soviet Union | 10 | Supplied by the Soviet Union. |
Attack helicopters
| Mil Mi-24 | Soviet Union | 3 | Supplied by the Soviet Union. |

=== Ships ===
| Name | Origin | Hull number | Quantity | Fate |
Patrol Boats
| Patrol Craft Fast | United States | Unknown | 9 | A few sunk during skirmishes between Thailand and later integrated into the RCN. |
| Patrol Boat, River | United States | Unknown | ~30 | Integrated into the RCN. |
| PO-2 class | Soviet Union | Unknown | 1 | Integrated into the RCN. |
| Zhuk class | Soviet Union | 1101 - 1102 | 2 | Integrated into the RCN. |
| Stenka class | Soviet Union | 1131 - 1134 | 4 | Integrated into the RCN. |
| Turya class | Soviet Union | 1121 - 1122 | 2 | Integrated into the RCN. |
River monitors
| Shmel class | Soviet Union | 1111 - 1114 | 4 | Integrated into the RCN. |
Landing craft
| T-4 class | Soviet Union | 60 - 62 | 30 | Integrated into the RCN. |

== Uniforms and insignia ==
Roundel (1979–1989)

Roundel (1989–1993)

Fin flash (1979–1989)

Fin flash (1989–1993)

Military uniforms in the KPRAF were worn by the main and by the provincial forces, although apparently not by the militia. In general, these uniforms resembled those of Vietnam and the Soviet Union. Battle dress for the soldiers consisted of green or khaki fatigues, with Soviet-style soft boonie hats (such as the Soviet Army wore in Afghanistan), or visored caps with a cloth chin strap. Although not part of the uniform, soldiers in an operation widely wore the krama, a checkered scarf knotted loosely about the neck. Junior officers serving on staff duty or attending service schools in Phnom Penh wore khaki shirts with ties, brown trousers, and the round service cap.

The cap device for all ranks consisted of a five-towered, stylized rendition of Angkor Wat on a red field, surrounded by a wreath. The device for senior ranks showed more elaborate gold ornamentation around the wreath. The KPRAF owned a garment factory in Phnom Penh, and it may have produced at least some of the uniforms it needed at this facility.

The KPRAF rank and branch insignia between 1979 and 1986 resembled those of the Vietnamese army. A new system of rank and branch insignia was adopted in July 1987 and was in use until 1993. They were worn on collar tabs of varying colors: scarlet for the army, dark blue for the navy, and sky blue for the air force. These branch insignia were worn by personnel up to the rank of deputy platoon commander.

Platoon commanders to deputy regimental commanders wore rank insignia on collar tabs with silver borders. Regimental commanders to deputy chiefs of military regions wore similar insignia with golden borders. Senior officers from military region commander to deputy defense minister wore collar tabs with a golden dragon surrounded by an ornate border on a maroon background.

=== Awards ===
After coming to power, the PRK instituted an array of awards and decorations for individuals, military units, and other organizations which performed noteworthy services for the party and the state. Identified awards or decorations included the following:

- Angkor Decoration
- National Defence Decoration (first and second class)
- Victory Decoration (first, second, and third class)
- National Construction Medal (first, second, and third class)
- Labour Medal

In addition to these medals, a number of citations, banners, and streamers were awarded by various government ministries, including the Ministry of National Defense, to both individuals and organizations for meritorious or distinguished performance of duty.

== See also ==
- National Army of Democratic Kampuchea
- Kangtoap Padevat
- K5 Plan
- Kampuchea Revolutionary Army
- UNTAC
