= Ministry of National Defence (Cambodia) =

Government ministry of Cambodia

- ក្រសួងការពារជាតិ Krasuong Kapea Cheat

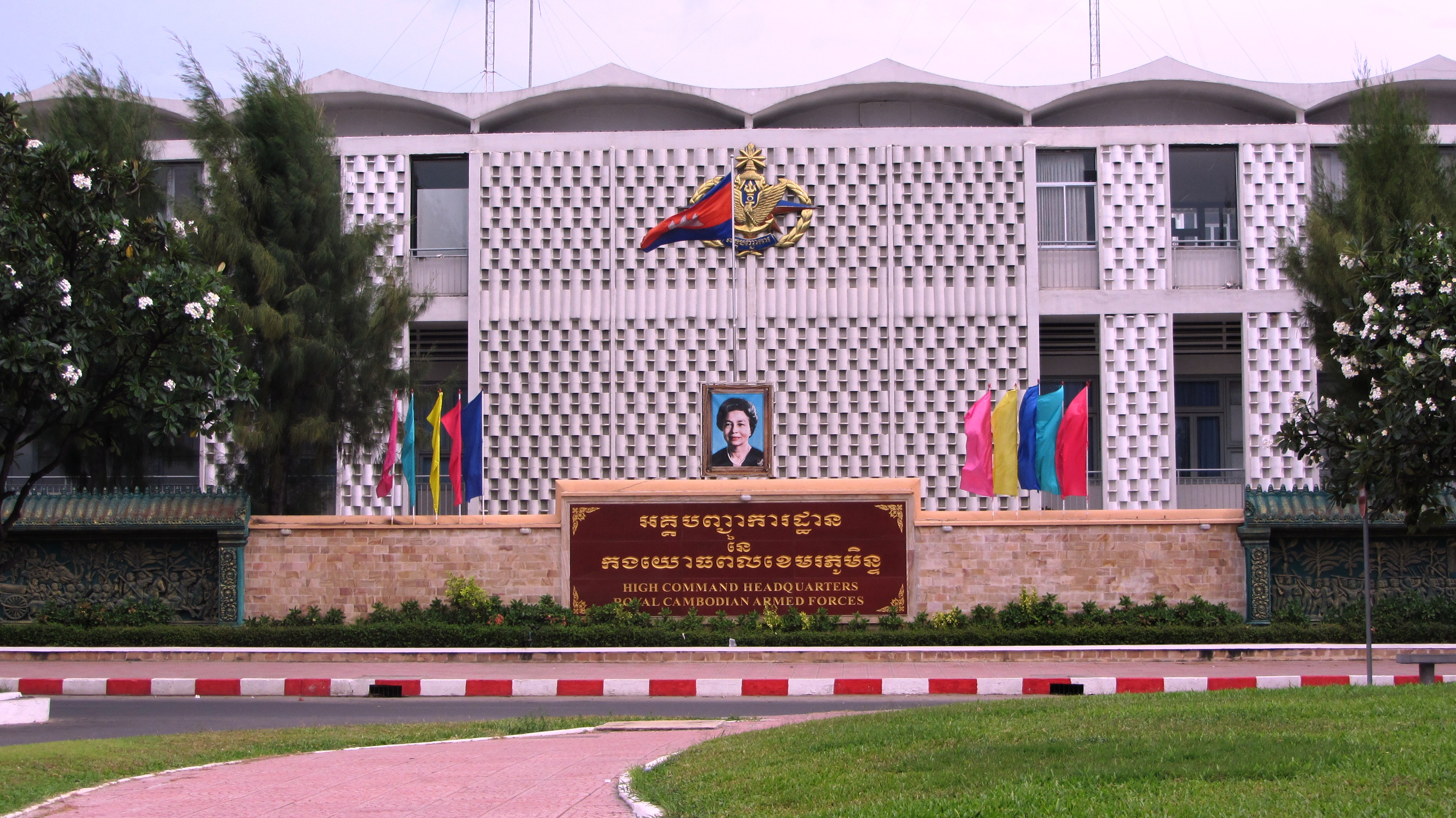
- Ministry headquarters at Phnom Penh

Agency overview
- Formed: 9 November 1953; 72 years ago
- Jurisdiction: Royal Government of Cambodia
- Headquarters: Bulgaria Blvd (114), Phnom Penh, Cambodia 12156
- Annual budget: $245,000,000 (2012)
- Minister responsible: General Tea Seiha, Minister of National Defence
- Website: URL: mod.gov.kh Telegram: Ministry of National Defence on Telegram

The Ministry of National Defence (Khmer: ក្រសួងការពារជាតិ, Krasuong Kapea Cheat) is charged with supervising all agencies and functions of the government relating directly to national security and the Royal Cambodian Armed Forces. It is Cambodia's ministry of defence. The current Minister of National Defence is Tea Seiha.

== Administrative areas ==
The Ministry of National Defence is divided into six administrative areas.

- High Command Headquarters of the Royal Cambodian Armed Forces
- Army HQ – Royal Cambodian Army
- Navy HQ – Royal Cambodian Navy
- Air Force HQ – Royal Cambodian Air Force
- Gendarmerie HQ – Royal Cambodian Gendarmerie

== History ==
=== Prior to 1970 ===
Prior to March 1970, the Forces armées royales khmères (FARK) General Staff was under the command and control of the Supreme Commander of the Armed Forces, and the Head of State. At that time, then Prince Norodom Sihanouk held both titles. The General Staff controlled the three Services with its headquarters also serving as headquarters and staff for the Army.

== Football team ==
The ministry also maintains a football team. Their club called the National Defense Ministry FC plays in the top division of Cambodian football, the Cambodian Premier League. They are tied with most Cambodian League Championships at three.

== Ministers ==
Portrait	Name (born–died)	Term of office		Notes
Portrait	Name (born–died)	Took office	Left office	Notes
	Sisowath Sirik Matak	January 1953	July 1953	
	Khim Tit	November 1953	April 1954	
	Nhiek Tioulong	April 1954	1954	
	Ngo Hou	August 1954	January 1955	
	San Yun	October 1956	April 1957	
	Sisowath Sirik Matak	July 1957	January 1958	
	Sim Var	April 1958	June 1958	
	Lon Nol លន់ នល់ (1913–1985)	10 September 1959	25 October 1966	
	Op Kim Ang	1966	1967	
	Duong Sam Ol	May 1967	April 1968	
	Lon Nol លន់ នល់ (1913–1985)	30 April 1968	1971	
	Sisowath Sirik Matak	May 1971	March 1972	
	Nginn Thappana	October 1972	December 1974	
	Hou Hong	October 1972	?	
	Son Sen សុន សេន (1930–1997)	15 January 1976	7 January 1979	
	Pen Sovan ប៉ែន សុវណ្ណ (1936–2016)	10 January 1979	5 December 1981	
	Chan Sy ចាន់ ស៊ី (1932–1984)	June 1981	February 1982	
	Bou Thang ប៊ូ ថង (1938–2019)	1982	December 1986	
	Tea Banh ទៀ បាញ់ (b. 1945)	August 1988	1993	
	Tea Chamrath	1993	1998	Co-minister
	Tea Banh ទៀ បាញ់ (b. 1945)	1993	22 August 2023	Co-minister
	Sisowath Sirirath	1998	2004	Co-minister
	Tea Seiha ទៀ សីហា (b. 1980)	22 August 2023	Incumbent	
