= Mithuna Phuthong =

Cambodian politician (born 1978 or 1979)

- មិថុនា ភូថង

Governor of the Koh Kong province
- In office 19 June 2017 – 20 August 2025
- Monarch: Norodom Sihamoni
- Prime Minister: Hun Sen; Hun Manet
- Deputy: Chhy Va
- Preceded by: Paitoon Phramkesorn
- Succeeded by: Chhy Va

Personal details
- Party: Cambodian People's Party
- Relatives: Say Phouthang (grandfather); Tea Vinh (uncle); Tea Banh (uncle)
- Education: United States Army War College

Mithuna Phuthong (Khmer: មិថុនា ភូថង; born 1978 or 1979) is a Cambodian politician, who served as Governor of the Koh Kong province between 2017 and 2025. She was the first woman governor of a Cambodian province.

== Early life ==
Mithuna was born in 1978 or 1979 into a prominent local political family of Thai origin; her grandfather was the Cambodian revolutionary Say Phouthang, her father is the former governor of the Koh Kong province Yuth Phuthong, and her uncles are the military officers and politicians Tea Vinh and Tea Banh. She studied at the United States Army War College.

== Career ==
In 2016, she was named vice governor of the Koh Kong province under Paitoon Phramkesorn leadership, and previously served as member of the Provincial Council. She was elected governor in the 2017 communal elections, becoming the first female governor of a Cambodian province, and was appointed by royal decree on 19 June 2017.

During her term as governor, she implemented a policy to develop the province by building and improving infrastructure, including the construction of a new provincial hall, a new public park, a hospital, health centers, schools, and temples to attract more private sector investment to Koh Kong province. In May 2021, during the COVID-19 pandemic in Cambodia, she ordered lockdowns in several villages and closed two tourists sites. The construction of the Dara Sakor International Airport was one of the main controversies in her tenure.

After the 2025 Cambodian–Thai border crisis on 20 August 2025, King Norodom Sihamoni appointed her Secretary of State for Women's Affairs and Chhy Va, who was vice governor, as her successor. Her dismissal was viewed by the opposition in Cambodia as a symbol of anti-Thai sentiment and ended her family's political dynasty, since her family was considered a bridge connecting the two countries.
