= Kangtoap Padevat =

Kangtoap Padevat (Revolutionary Army) was a Khmer language weekly newspaper in Cambodia, published in the 1980s. The first issue appeared in December 1979. Kongtoap Padevat was the organ of the Kampuchean People's Revolutionary Armed Forces.
