= Vong Pisen =

Cambodian general

His Excellency General Vong Pisen
- វង្ស ពិសេន
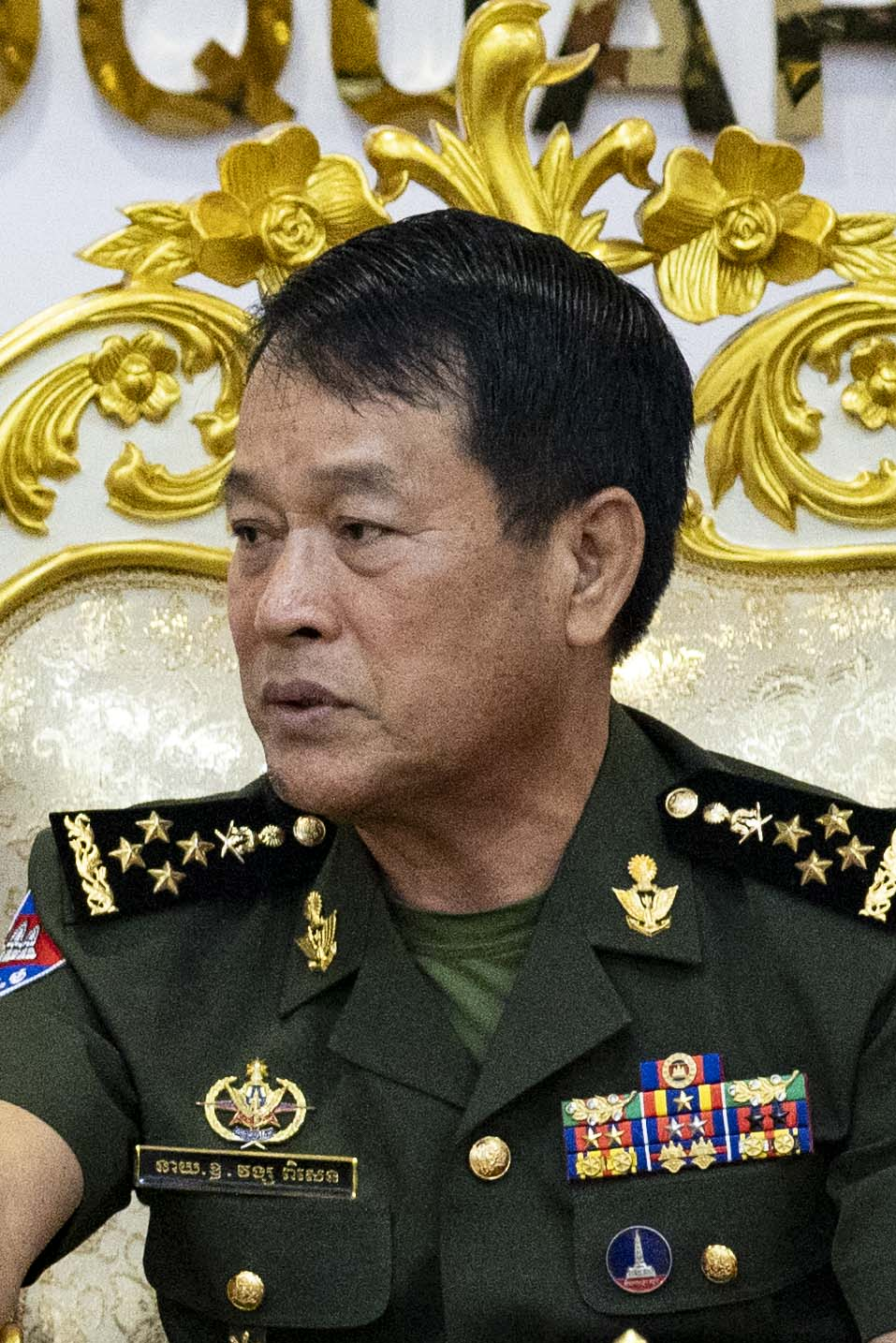
- Vong Pisen in 2024

Commander-in-chief of the Royal Cambodian Armed Forces
- Incumbent
- Assumed office 6 September 2018
- Preceded by: Pol Saroeun

Military service
- Allegiance: Cambodia
- Branch/service: Royal Cambodian Armed Forces

Vong Pisen (Khmer: វង្ស ពិសេន, UNGEGN: Vôngs Pĭsén [ʋɔŋ piseːn]) is a Cambodian general. He serves as Commander-in-chief of the Royal Cambodian Armed Forces since 6 September 2018.
