= Royal Gendarmerie of Cambodia =

Royal Gendarmerie of Cambodia កងរាជអាវុធហត្ថ (Khmer) Gendarmerie royale khmère (French)
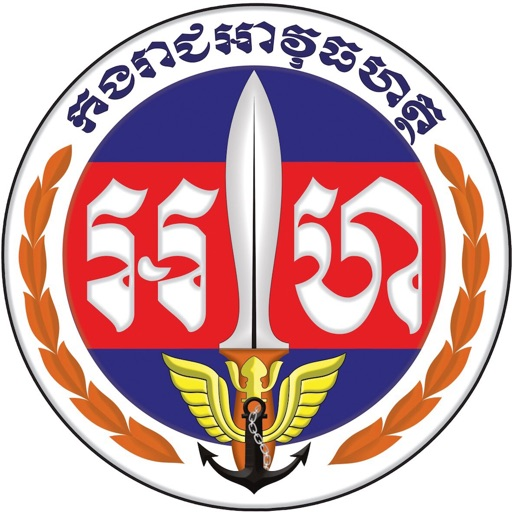
- Emblem
- Motto: "សង្គ្រោះ បម្រើ ការពារ" (Khmer) "Rescue, Serve, Protect"

Agency overview
- Formed: 20 July 1954 (original) 18 March 1970 – 17 April 1975 as National Gendarmerie 14 July 1993 (re-established)

Jurisdictional structure
- National agency: Cambodia
- Operations jurisdiction: Cambodia
- General nature: Gendarmerie

Operational structure
- Headquarters: Phnom Penh, Cambodia
- Members: 30,000
- Agency executive: Gen. Sao Sokha, Commander
- Parent agency: Royal Cambodian Armed Forces

The Royal Gendarmerie of Cambodia (Khmer: កងរាជអាវុធហត្ថ [kɑːŋ riəc.ʔaːʋut.hat]; French: Gendarmerie royale khmère, GRK) is the national gendarmerie force of the Kingdom of Cambodia. It is a branch of the Royal Cambodian Armed Forces and it is responsible for the maintenance of public order and internal security in Cambodia. The paramilitary unit has a strength of 30,000 soldiers deployed in all provinces. Its headquarters is located in Phnom Penh, with the unit's chain of command through the Royal Cambodian Armed Forces High Command. The Gendarmerie is under the direct supervision of a commander with an equivalent rank to General. The High Command is responsible for monitoring all Gendarmerie units as well as general training. The current commander is General Sao Sokha, a former bodyguard and personal advisor to Cambodia's former prime minister Hun Sen.

== Duties ==
The Royal Gendarmerie of Cambodia's duties are:

- Restoring peace and stability if they have been heavily disturbed
- Counter terrorism
- Countering violent groups
- Repressing riots in prisons.

Its civil duties include: to provide security and public peace, to investigate and prevent organised crime, terrorism and other violent groups; to protect state and private property; to help and assist civilians and other emergency forces in a case of emergency, natural disaster, civil unrest and armed conflicts.

Its military duties include: to preserve and protect national security, state, property, public peace, and public order, and to assist other security forces in case of emergency, civil unrest, war; to repress riots; to reinforce martial law and mobilisation; to fight and apprehend suspected criminals, terrorists and other violent groups.

== Organization ==
The Royal Gendarmerie consists of 10 battalion sized units. Each battalion has between 500 – 1000 policemen. The principal bases are located in Phnom Penh.

The gendarmerie monitors all the 25 provinces and 186 districts, working with the local people. The unit includes: a mobile team, consisting of six intervention units, an intervention vehicle battalion, a cavalry, and 4 infantry, with bases in Phnom Penh. Its training school is located in Kamboul Commune, Kandal Province.

== List of commanders (since 1993) ==
Image	Name	In office			Note
Image	Name	From	To	Duration	Note
	Maj. Gen. Keo Samuon ឧ.ទោ កែវ សាមួន	18 November 1993	24 May 1994	187 days	
	Maj. Gen. Kieng Savuth ឧ.ទោ គៀង សាវុធ	24 May 1994	29 March 1999	4 years, 309 days	
	Gen. Sao Sokha ឧ. សៅ សុខា	29 March 1999	Incumbent	27 years, 230 days	

== See also ==
- List of gendarmeries
- Royal Cambodian Armed Forces
- Royal Cambodian Army
- Royal Cambodian Navy
- Royal Cambodian Air Force
