= Commander-in-chief of the Royal Cambodian Armed Forces =

Military chief of staff of Cambodia

Commander-in-Chief of the Royal Cambodian Armed Forces
- អគ្គមេបញ្ជាការនៃកងយោធពលខេមរភូមិន្ទ
- Emblem of the Royal Cambodian Armed Forces

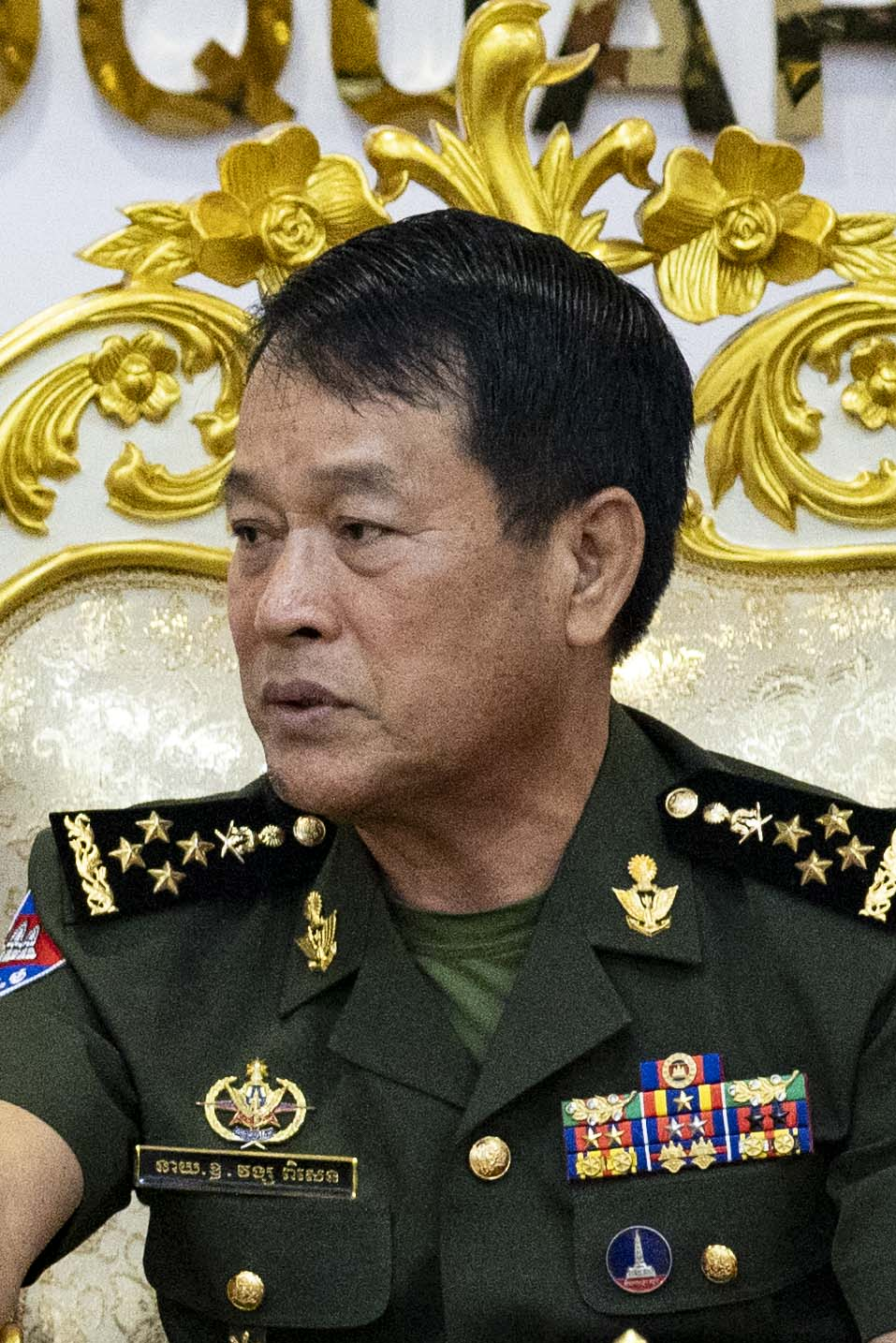
- Incumbent; Gen. Vong Pisen since 6 September 2018
- Ministry of National Defence
- Reports to: Minister of National Defence
- Residence: Phnom Penh, Kingdom of Cambodia
- Appointer: Monarch of Cambodia
- Formation: 1 November 1993
- Deputy: Deputy Commander-in-Chief

The commander-in-chief of the Royal Cambodian Armed Forces (Khmer: អគ្គមេបញ្ជាការនៃកងយោធពលខេមរភូមិន្ទ) is the highest-ranking military officer of the Royal Cambodian Armed Forces, who is responsible for maintaining the operational command of the military and its major branches.

== List of commanders ==
=== Khmer National Armed Forces (1970–1975) ===
No.	Portrait	Name (Birth–Death)	Term of office			Ref.
No.	Portrait	Name (Birth–Death)	Took office	Left office	Time in office	Ref.
1		Sosthène Fernandez (1923–2006)	March 1970	1975	4–5 years	

=== Liberation Army of Kampuchea (1977–1979) ===
No.	Portrait	Name (Birth–Death)	Term of office			Ref.
No.	Portrait	Name (Birth–Death)	Took office	Left office	Time in office	Ref.
1		Pol Pot (1925–1998)	1977	1979	1–2 years	

=== Kampuchean People's Revolutionary Armed Forces (1979–1989) ===
No.	Portrait	Name (Birth–Death)	Term of office			Ref.
No.	Portrait	Name (Birth–Death)	Took office	Left office	Time in office	Ref.
1		Heng Samrin (born 1934)	1979	1989	9–10 years	

=== Cambodian People's Armed Forces (1989–1993) ===
No.	Portrait	Name (Birth–Death)	Term of office			Ref.
No.	Portrait	Name (Birth–Death)	Took office	Left office	Time in office	Ref.
1		Heng Samrin (born 1934)	1989	1993	3–4 years	

=== Royal Cambodian Armed Forces (1993–present) ===
No.	Portrait	Name (Birth–Death)	Term of office			Ref.
No.	Portrait	Name (Birth–Death)	Took office	Left office	Time in office	Ref.
1	Norodom Ranariddh	Norodom Ranariddh (born 1944) as Co Commander-in-chief	1 November 1993	7 July 1997	3 years, 248 days	
1	Hun Sen	Hun Sen (born 1952) as Co Commander-in-chief until 1997	1 November 1993	28 January 1999	5 years, 88 days	
2	Ke Kim Yan	General; Ke Kim Yan	28 January 1999	23 January 2009	9 years, 361 days	
3	Pol Saroeun	General; Pol Saroeun	23 January 2009	30 June 2018	9 years, 130 days	
–	Sao Sokha	General; Sao Sokha; Acting	2 July 2018	6 September 2018	96 days	
4	Vong Pisen	General; Vong Pisen	6 September 2018	Incumbent	8 years, 46 days	
