= Chhy Va =

Cambodian politician

- ឈី វ៉ា

Governor of the Koh Kong province
- Incumbent
- Assumed office 20 August 2025
- Monarch: Norodom Sihamoni
- Prime Minister: Hun Manet
- Preceded by: Mithuna Phuthong

Personal details
- Party: Cambodian People's Party

Chhy Va (Khmer: ឈី វ៉ា) is a Cambodian politician. She has been serving as Governor of the Koh Kong province since 2025. She previously served as provincial vice governor.

== Career ==
Va served as vice governor of the Koh Kong province under Mithuna Phuthong. By royal decree of 20 August 2025, Mithuna was removed from office as governor of the province and Chhy took over as her successor.

At her inauguration, Chhy pledged to raise citizens’ standard of living and social welfare, reduce poverty, and promote transparency and good governance. In November 2025, she urged to modernise and diversify Dara Sakor’s tourism offering, improving the quality, safety and sustainability of its facilities and services while emphasised the importance of protecting the coastal environment and promoting Koh Kong as a national and international tourist destination.

In September 2026, her government successfully intervened to secure the release of two Cambodian fishermen arrested by Thai navy in February 2026 who had been accused of crossing the border to fish in Trat province. On 25 May 2026, Chhy announced police operations against online scam in all towns and villages across the province.
