= Military ranks of the People's Republic of Kampuchea =

The military ranks of People's Republic of Kampuchea were the military insignia used by the Kampuchean People's Revolutionary Armed Forces.

== Commissioned officer ranks ==
The rank insignia of commissioned officers.

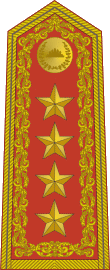
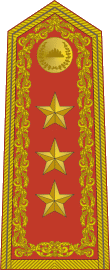
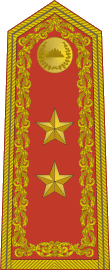
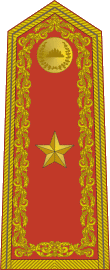
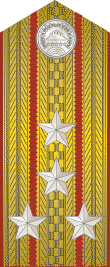
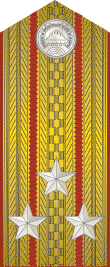
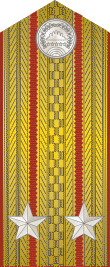
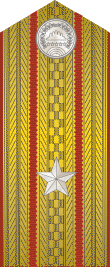
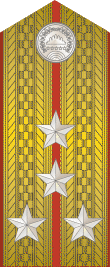
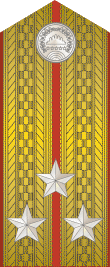
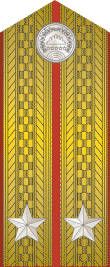
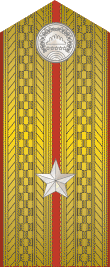
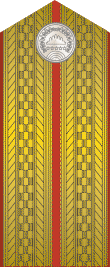
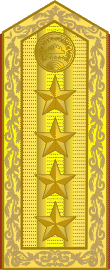
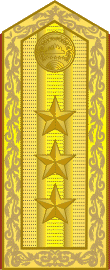
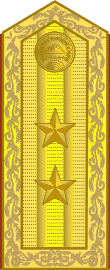
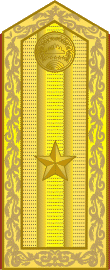
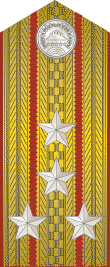
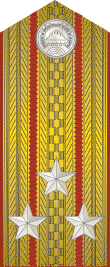
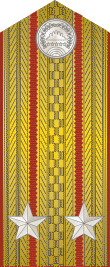
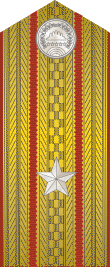
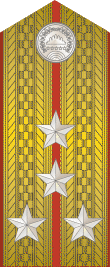
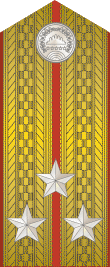
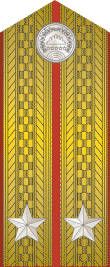
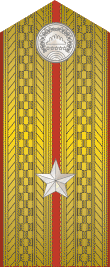
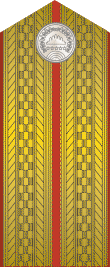
Rank group	General / flag officers				Senior officers				Junior officers
Rank	នាយឧត្តមសេនីយ៍	ឧត្ដមសេនីយ៍ឯក	ឧត្តមសេនីយ៍ទោ	ឧត្តមសេនីយ៍ត្រី	វរសេនីយ៍ឯក	វរសេនីយ៍ឯកបម្រុង	វរសេនីយ៍ទោ	វរសេនីយ៍ត្រី	អនុសេនីយ៍ឯក	អនុសេនីយ៍ឯកបម្រុង	អនុសេនីយ៍ទោ	អនុសេនីយ៍ត្រី	នាយចំណង់
Romanization	Neay utdamsenei	Utdamsenei ek	Utdamsenei to	Utdamsenei trei	Veareasenei ek	Veareasenei ek bamrong	Veareasenei to	Veareasenei trei	Anusenei ek	Anusenei ek bamrong	Anusenei to	Anusenei trei	Neay chamnang
Literal translation	Senior general	First general	Second general	Third general	First senior officer	Reserve first senior officer	Second senior officer	Third senior officer	First junior officer	Reserve first junior officer	Second junior officer	Third junior officer	Officer cadet
Equivalent translation	General	Colonel general	Lieutenant general	Major general	Senior colonel	Colonel	Lieutenant colonel	Major	Captain	Senior lieutenant	1st lieutenant	2nd lieutenant	Officer cadet
Kampuchean People's Revolutionary Armed Forces (1979–1986)
Cambodian People's Armed Forces (1987–1993)
Rank group	General / flag officers				Senior officers				Junior officers

== Other ranks ==
The rank insignia of non-commissioned officers and enlisted personnel.

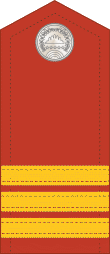
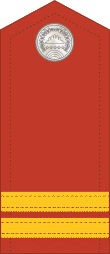
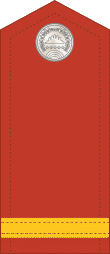
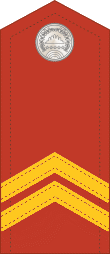
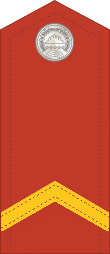
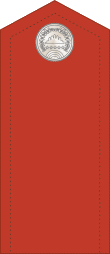
Rank group	Senior NCOs			Junior NCOs		Enlisted
Rank	ពលបាលឯក	ពលបាលទោ	ពលបាលត្រី	នាយឯក	នាយទោ	ពលទោ
Romanization	Pôlôbal êk	Pôlôbal toŭ	Pôlôbal trei	Néay êk	Néay toŭ	Pôl toŭ
Literal translation
Kampuchean People's; Revolutionary Armed Forces (1979–1993)
Rank group	Senior NCOs			Junior NCOs		Enlisted
