= Orders, decorations, and medals of Cambodia =

Cambodian honors system consists of a number of orders, decorations and medals through which the country's sovereign awards its citizens for actions or deeds that benefit the nation. The modern system was established under Colonial French Rule and continued with modification after independence until the fall of the Khmer Republic on 17 April 1975. The current system was reinstated on 5 October 1995 by the Decree for the Establishment and Use of Decorations of Honor of the Kingdom of Cambodia No. 1095/01. The system includes an array of awards, both civil and military, for gallantry, bravery, distinguished service, meritorious service and long service. Various campaign and commemorative medals have also been struck.

== History ==
The Cambodian honors system is based on European/French models. Many of the honors are orders of chivalry granted by royal decree or sub-decree. This system was established under Colonial French Rule and continued with modification after independence until the fall of the Khmer Republic on 17 April 1975. The current system was reinstated on 5 October 1995 by the Decree for the Establishment and Use of Decorations of Honor of the Kingdom of Cambodia No. 1095/01. Many of the modern awards have origins from Cambodia's period as a French colony or under the Kingdom of Cambodia under the rule of King Norodom Sihanouk.

== Nominating for awards ==
Under the current system, candidates are nominated by government ministries through a Decoration of Honor Candidate Qualification Review Committee. These committees refer nominations, with justification, to the Council of Ministers for a decision.

== Categories of honors and awards ==
As established by Royal Decree, the hierarchy of decorations of honors are:

=== Awards for National and Motherland Defense ===
- Grand Order of National Merit
- Royal Order of Cambodia

(์old version)	(์new version)
		Knight Grand Cross
		Knight Grand Officer
		Knight Commander
		Knight Officer
		Knight or Chevalier

- National Independence Medal

=== Royal Household Awards ===
- Medal of the Crown
- Medal of Norodom I
- Medal of Sisowath I
- Medal of Norodom Sihanouk
- Medal of Norodom Suramarit
- Anussara Medal of Royal Remembrance

=== Medals of National Defense ===
- Sena Jayaseddh Medal
- Medal of National Defense
  - with gold stars
  - with silver stars
  - with bronze stars

=== Multi-Category ===
- Royal Order of H.M. The Queen Preah Kossomak Nearireath
  - Grand Cross
  - Grand Officer
  - Commander
  - Officer
  - Knight
- Royal Order of Sahametrei
  - Grand Cross
  - Grand Officer
  - Commander
  - Officer
  - Knight
- Royal Order of Sowathara

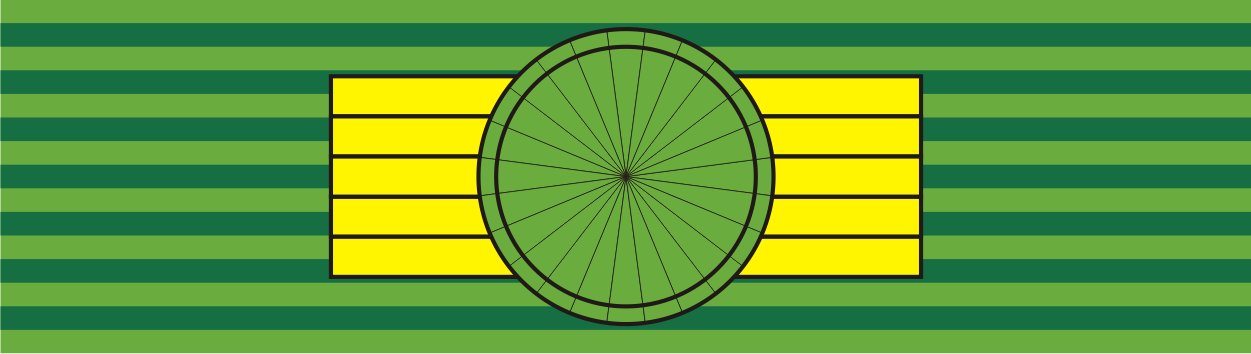
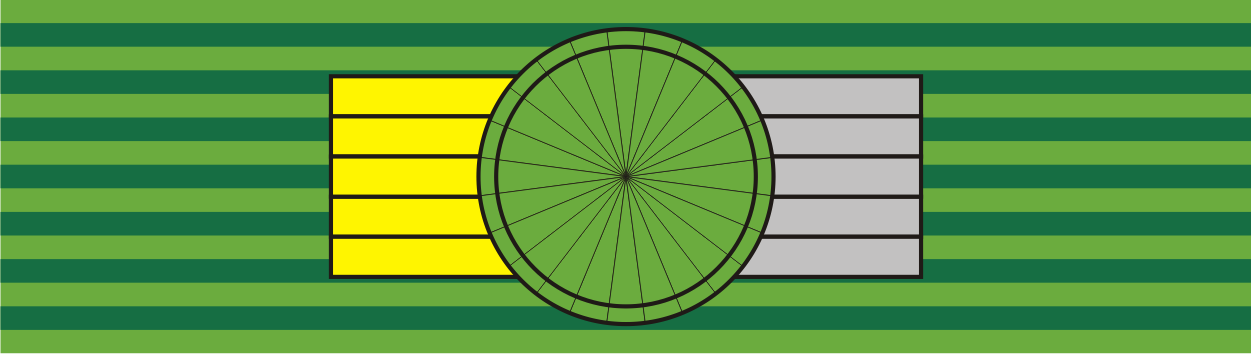
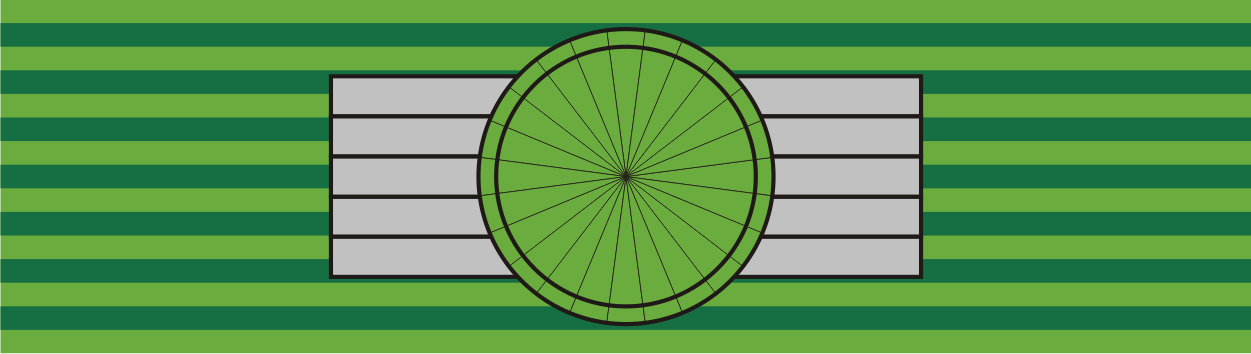
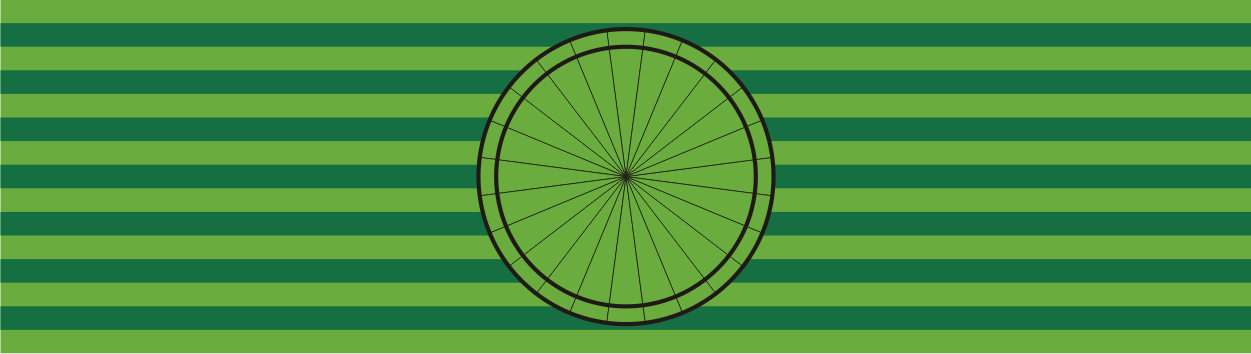
(์old version)	(์new version)
		Knight Grand Cross
		Knight Grand Officer
		Commander
		Officer
		Knight

- Royal Order of Monisaraphon
  - Grand Cross
  - Grand Officer
  - Commander
  - Officer
  - Knight
- Medal of Labour
- Decoration of National Construction
- Khemara Kelarith Sports Medal
  - With Gold Stars
  - With Silver Stars
  - With Bronze Stars
- Order of Satrei Vathana (Feminine Merit)
  - First Class
  - Second Class
  - Third Class
