= Tea Seiha =

Cambodian politician (born 1980)

His Excellency Tea Seiha
- ទៀ សីហា
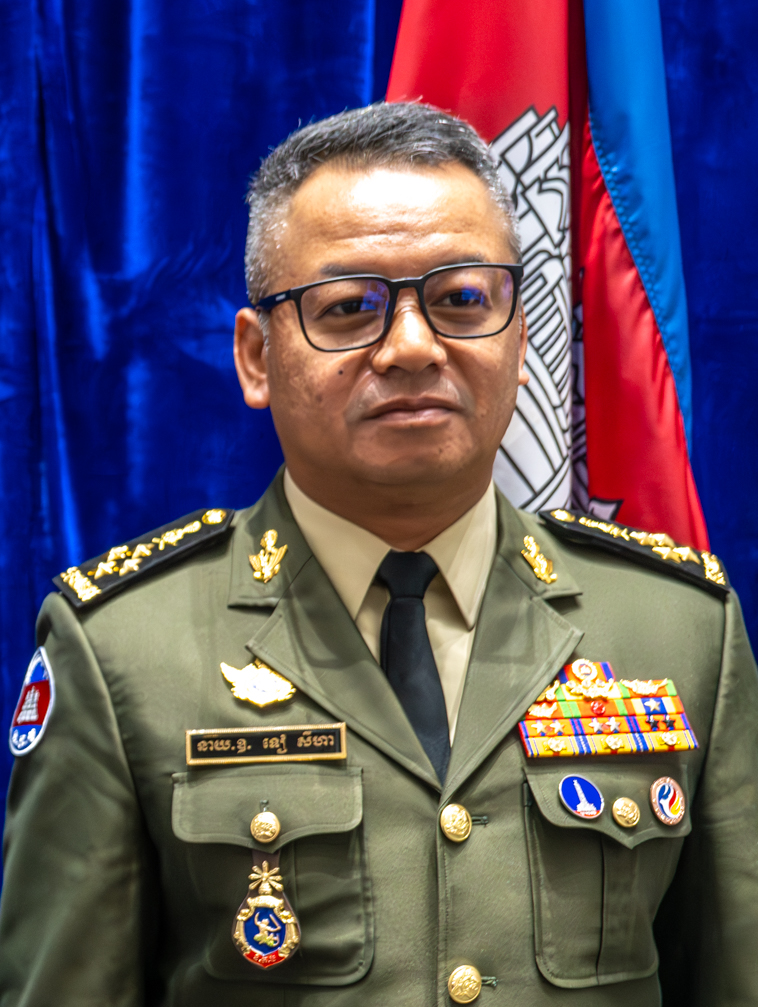
- Tea Seiha in 2024

Deputy Prime Minister of Cambodia
- Incumbent
- Assumed office 22 August 2023
- Prime Minister: Hun Manet

Minister of National Defence
- Incumbent
- Assumed office 22 August 2023
- Prime Minister: Hun Manet
- Preceded by: Tea Banh

Member of Parliament for Siem Reap
- Incumbent
- Assumed office 21 August 2023

Governor of Siem Reap Province
- In office 12 December 2018 – 21 August 2023
- Preceded by: Khim Bunsong
- Succeeded by: Prak Sophoan

Personal details
- Born: 31 August 1980 (age 46) Phnom Penh, People's Republic of Kampuchea
- Party: Cambodian People's Party
- Parent(s): Tea Banh (father); Tao Toeun (mother)
- Education: École spéciale militaire de Saint-Cyr

Military service
- Allegiance: Cambodia
- Branch/service: Royal Cambodian Army
- Rank: General
- Battles/wars: 2025 Cambodia–Thailand border conflict

Tea Seiha (Khmer: ទៀ សីហា; born 31 August 1980) is a Cambodian politician and general who is the current Minister of National Defence. He was previously the governor of Siem Reap province from 2018 to 2023. He is the son of former Defence Minister Tea Banh.

== Border Dispute ==
Defense Minister Tea Seiha called for a formal public apology from a former Thai ranger who assaulted a Cambodian soldier during a recent border confrontation at Ta Moan Thom Temple. Seiha acknowledged the possibility of a private apology but emphasized that no official or public statement had been issued.

The Ministry of National Defense affirmed its commitment to pursuing the matter and warned that legal action could be considered if a public apology is not forthcoming.

== Personal life ==
Seiha went to school at Passy Saint-Honoré in France. Seiha went to the military academy of École spéciale militaire de Saint-Cyr in France, a French military academy started by Napoleon I.
