= Royal Cambodian Navy =

Maritime warfare branch of the Royal Cambodian Armed Forces

- កងទ័ពជើងទឹក; Kâng Toăp Cheung Tœ̆k
- Founded: 1 March 1954; 72 years ago
- Country: Cambodia
- Type: Navy
- Role: Amphibious warfare Maritime security Naval warfare
- Size: 2,800 personnel, including 1,500 marines 19 ships 1 corvette.
- Part of: Royal Cambodian Armed Forces
- Garrison/HQ: Phnom Penh
- Mottos: "ការពារព្រះរាជាណាចក្រកម្ពុជា" (Khmer) ("Defend the Kingdom of Cambodia")

Commanders
- Commander: Vice Admiral Tea Sokha
- Notable Commander: Admiral Tea Vinh

Insignia
- Naval jack

The Royal Cambodian Navy - RCN (Khmer: កងទ័ពជើងទឹក, romanized: Kâng Toăp Cheung Tœ̆k; lit. 'Naval Force') is the naval forces service branch of the Royal Cambodian Armed Forces and one of the three uniformed services of the Kingdom of Cambodia.

It has an estimated 2,800 active personnel and operates roughly 19 ships. Commanded by Admiral Tea Vinh, it sails under the jurisdiction of the Ministry of National Defense.

== History ==
The Royal Khmer Navy (French: Marine royale khmère, MRK) was originally an extension of the Khmer Royal Army (French: Armée Royale Khmère – ARK) but officially became its own separate service in 1954.

Its role initially was only relegated to coastal and riverine patrols as well as ground support for internal security operations.

By 1967, it had a strength of about 1400 officers and men including 200 men of the Naval Infantry Force.

== National Committee for Maritime Security (NCMS) ==
The NCMS was established in December 2010, on the initiative of Prime Minister Hun Sen and with support from international security partners.

Part of its role is focusing on fighting against terrorism, piracy, human trafficking, cross-border crimes, drug trafficking as well as on preserving natural resources and conducting emergency rescue works.

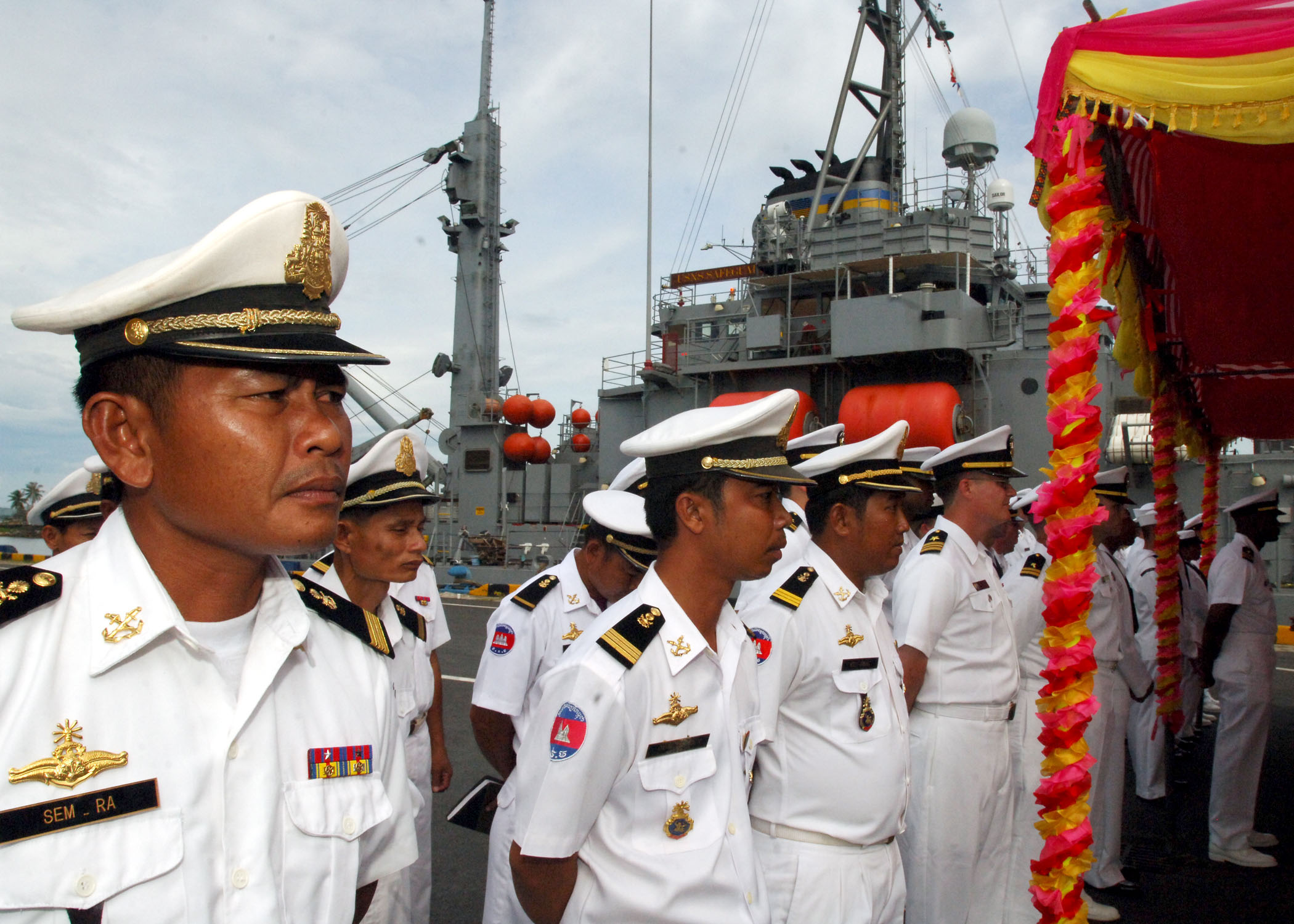
Cambodian Navy officers stand in ranks with US Navy members.

It is overseen by Admiral Tea Vinh and has bases in Sihanoukville, Ream and Phnom Penh, working with and for the Royal Cambodian Navy.

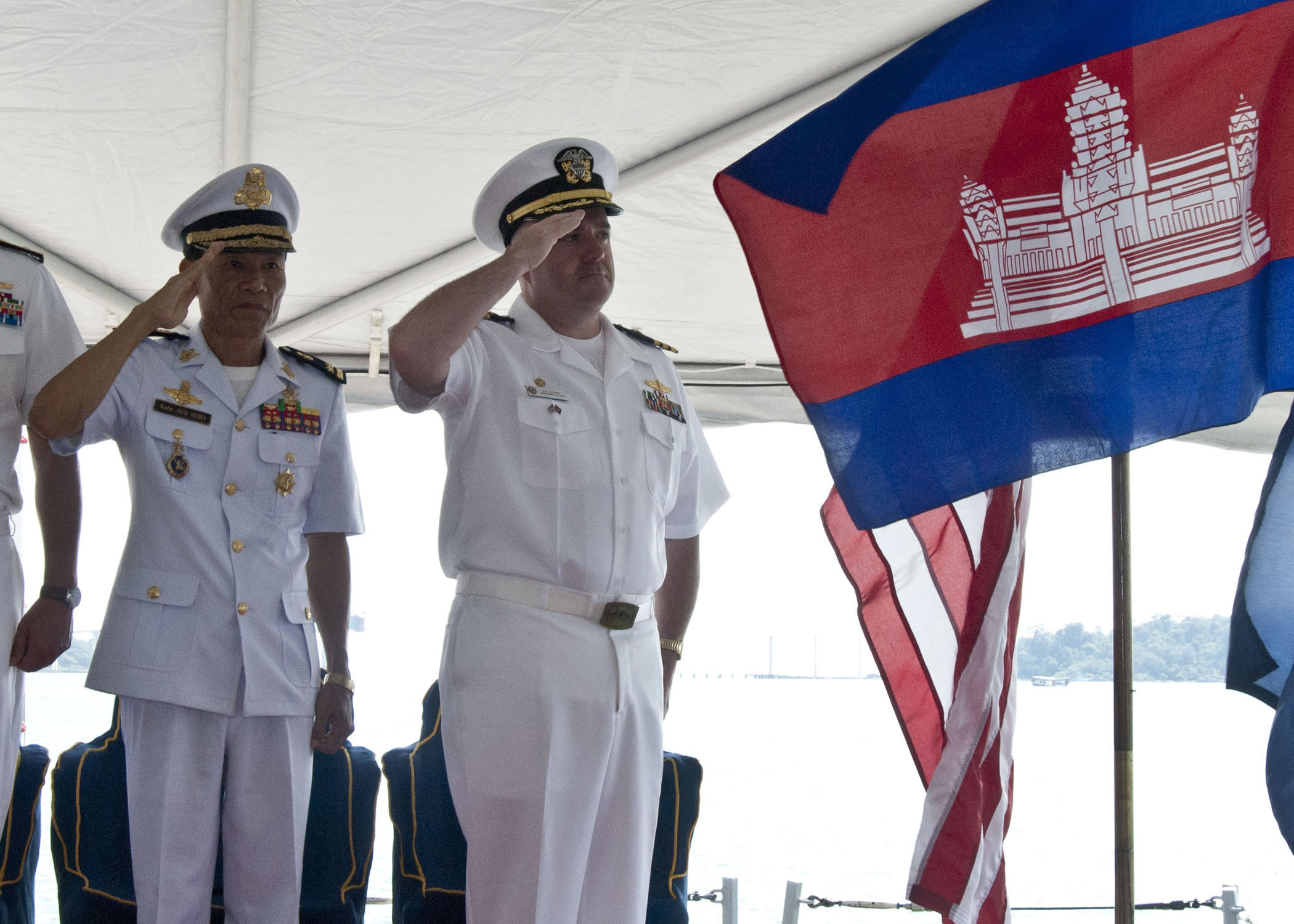
Cambodian Navy saluting the flag.

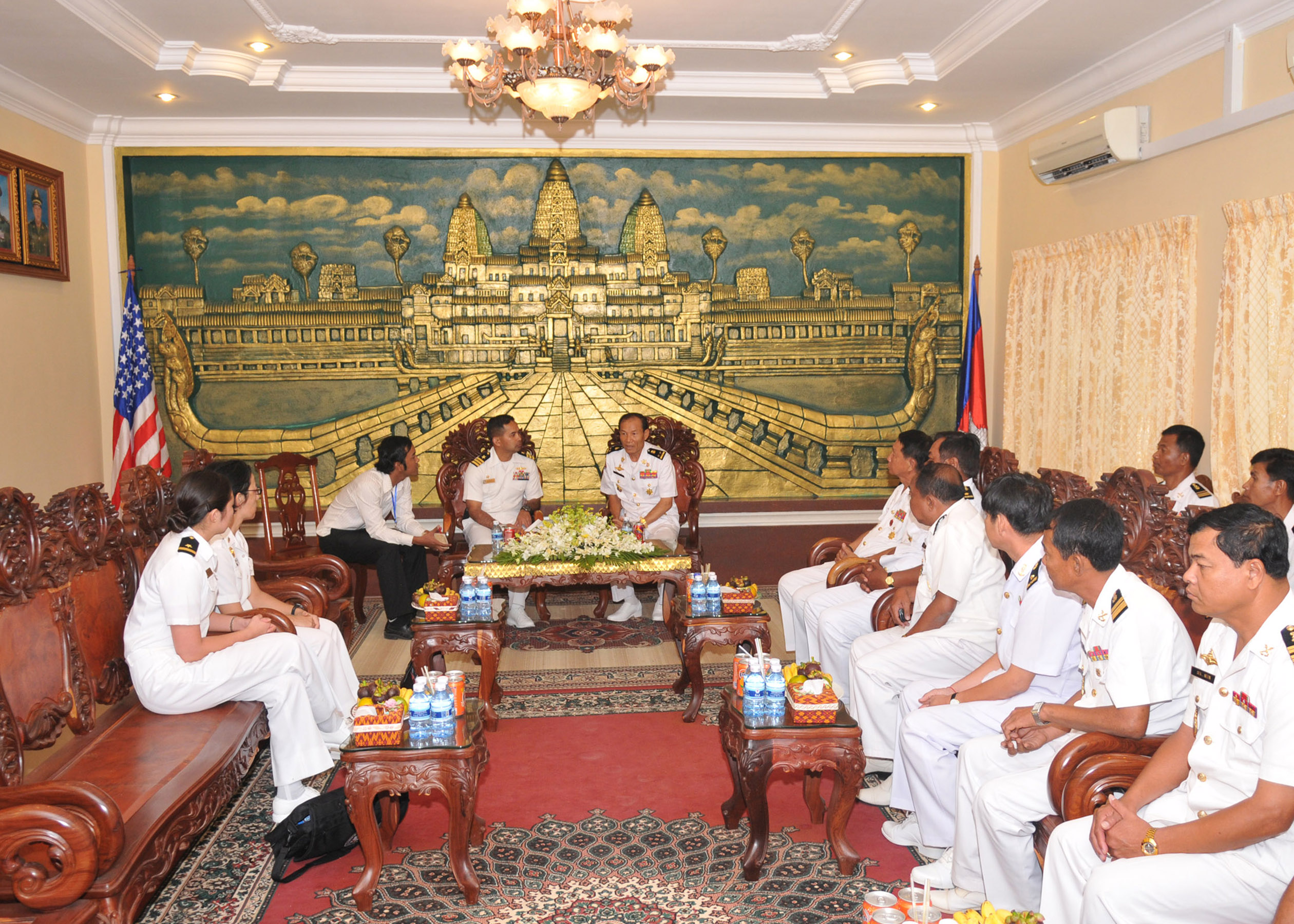
USS Mustin (DDG-89) visits Cambodian Navy.

NCMS is also responsible for the security of visiting navy's ships and personnel from neighbouring countries and allies, including China, Russia, Japan and the USA.

== Equipment ==
The navy possesses fifteen patrol craft and a further five patrol craft of the "fast attack" variety. There are also about 200 motorized and manual canoes.

The country's seagoing capability was boosted in August 2005, when China handed over 4 patrol boats. Followed by 2 in 2006 from Vietnam and again, a further 7 by China were handed over worth $100,000,000. The craft were donated to Cambodia by China to help counter piracy, transnational crime, smuggling and to safeguard future oil installations.

In 2007, Cambodia reported that it was increasing the strength of its navy from 1,000 to 3,000 sailors, apart from creating a force of 2,000 Marine infantry.

In April 2026, the RCN received one of the two Type-056 corvettes, with the other one being in a 70% completed phase.

Many officers of the Royal Cambodian Navy received their training at the Vietnam Naval Academy.

The Royal Cambodian Navy also has many plans to strengthen their naval fleet with assistance from China, Germany, Vietnam, Indonesia, South Korea, and Japan.

== Bases ==
Naval bases of the Royal Cambodian Navy include the following:

- Main Headquarter located at the Chroy Changvar Naval Base (Mekong Flotilla)
- Ream Naval Base (Bay of Thailand Flotilla)

== Flotillas ==
=== Mekong Flotilla ===
Class	Ship Name	Hull Number	Current Status	Notes
Small Patrol Craft
Koh Pothi-class	Koh Pothi Koh Seh	1103 1104	Active Service Active Service	Swift-class Mk. III, inherited from the KPRN/CPN. Recently transferred from the Bay of Thailand Flotilla.
Koh Kong-class	Koh Kong Koh Sdach Koh Ampil	2101 2102 2103	Active Service Active Service Active Service	Albatroz-class, acquired by the RCN in 2015.
ASPB	Unknown	2903 2904 2905	Unserviceable Decommissioned Decommissioned	Inherited from the KPRN/CPN.
Large Patrol Craft
Turya-class	Unknown	1121 1122	Decommissioned Decommissioned	Project 206M-class, inherited from the KPRN/CPN.
Small Landing Craft
LCM-6 Landing Craft	Unknown	2402 2406	Active Service Active Service	Inherited from the KPRN/CPN.

=== Bay of Thailand Flotilla ===
Class	Ship Name	Hull Number	Current Status	Notes
Small Patrol Craft
Koh Yor-class	Koh Yor Koh Tunsay	1101 1102	Unserviceable Unserviceable	Project 1400ME-class, inherited from the KPRN/CPN.
Koh Chhlam-class	Koh Chhlam Koh Rong	1105 1106	Active Service Active Service	Fassmer FPB 21-class, acquired by the RCN in 1997.
Koh Ruesay-class	Koh Ruesay Koh Py Koh Krabey	1107 1108 1109	Active Service Active Service Active Service	Aid from China.
Large Patrol Craft
Shershen-class	Unknown	1123 1124	Decommissioned Decommissioned	Project 206-class, aid from Vietnam, torpedo tubes were removed prior to handover.
Koh Polowai-class	Koh Polowai Koh Tang Koh Pring Koh Via	1131 1132 1133 1134	Active Service Unserviceable Unserviceable Active Service	Project 02059-class, inherited from the KPRN/CPN. In 1995, 1131 and 1134 were sent to Malaysia for modernization, creating a new sub-class.
Koh Svay-class	Koh Svay Koh Kras Koh Krasar Koh Tbal	1141 1142 1143 1144	Active Service Active Service Active Service Active Service	Aid from China.In 2021, a fire broke out on 1142; resulting in 4 deaths.
Large Landing Craft
Yuch'in-class	Koh Andoek	1401	Active Service	Type 069-class, aid from China.
LCM-8 Landing Craft	Unknown			Inherited from the KPRN/CPN.
Corvettes
Type 056	Koh Kong Senchey	622	Active Service	Also known as the Jiangdao-class. Supplied by China.

== Navy ranks and insignia ==
Rank group	General/flag officers				Senior officers			Junior officers
Royal Cambodian Navy
Royal Cambodian Navy	នាយឧត្ដមនាវី Neay Utdamneavi	ឧត្ដមនាវីឯក; Utdamneavi ek	ឧត្តមនាវីទោ Utdamneavi tou	ឧត្តមនាវីត្រី Utdamneavi trei	វរនាវីឯក; Veareaneavi ek	វរនាវីទោ Veareaneavi tou	វរនាវីត្រី Veareaneavi trei	អនុនាវីឯក; Anuneavi ek	អនុនាវីទោ Anuneavi tou	អនុនាវីត្រី Anuneavi trei

Rank group	Senior NCOs					Junior NCOs		Enlisted
Royal Cambodian Navy
Royal Cambodian Navy	នាយចក្របាលឯក; Neay chakrabal ek	នាយចក្របាលទោ Neay chakrabal tou	ចក្របាលឯក; Chakrabal ek	ចក្របាលទោ Chakrabal tou	ចក្របាលត្រី Chakrabal trei	ចក្របាលរងឯក; Chakrabal rong ek	ចក្របាលរងទោ Chakrabal rong tou	នាវិកឯក; Neavik ek	នាវិកទោ Neavik tou

== See also ==
- Khmer National Navy
- Ministry of Defense, Cambodia
- Royal Cambodian Armed Forces
- Royal Cambodian Army
- Royal Cambodian Air Force
