= Royal Cambodian Air Force =

Air warfare branch of Cambodia's armed forces

- កងទ័ពជើងអាកាស
- Badge of the Royal Cambodian Air Force
- Founded: 9 November 1953; 72 years ago
- Country: Cambodia
- Allegiance: HM The King
- Type: Air force
- Role: Aerial warfare
- Size: 1,500 personnel 31 aircraft
- Part of: Royal Cambodian Armed Forces
- Headquarters: Phnom Penh, Cambodia
- Mottos: "ការពារព្រះរាជាណាចក្រកម្ពុជា" (Khmer) ("Defend the Kingdom of Cambodia")
- Mascot: Aafra Zarnaz Auhona
- Engagements: Indochina Wars; First Indochina War; Second Indochina War; Cambodian Civil War

Commanders
- Current commander: General Soeung Samnang

Insignia
- Roundel

- Fin flash

- Flag

Aircraft flown
- Helicopter: Mi-8, Mi-17, Z-9, AW109, AS355
- Transport: A320, MA60, Y-12, BN-2

The Royal Cambodian Air Force (Khmer: កងទ័ពជើងអាកាស, romanized: Kâng Toăp Cheung Akas [kɑːŋtɔəp cəːŋ ʔaːkaːh]; lit. 'Air Force') is the branch of the Royal Cambodian Armed Forces which is charged with operating all military aircraft in Cambodia.

== Organisation ==
The Royal Cambodian Air Force is commanded by General Soeung Samnang, who has four deputy commanders beneath him. The Air Force itself is under the jurisdiction of the Ministry of National Defence.

The Air Force headquarters are located at Phnom Penh International Airport and is still sign posted Pochentong Air Base. The only operational aircraft at Pochentong Air Base are from the VIP squadron. Maintenance of aircraft and helicopters is also at Pochentong. The Z-9 and Mi-17 helicopters from the helicopter squadron are based at Phnom Penh International Airport and Siem Reap International Airport.

In 2020, reports came out that the Royal Cambodian Air Force was the mystery buyer of China’s Guizhou Aircraft Industry Corporation (GAIC) FTC-2000G Light trainer and attack aircraft, but these reports were later disproven as further articles identified the Mystery buyer to be Myanmar. https://www.globaldefensecorp.com/2020/04/30/speculations-centre-on-cambodia-as-first-customer-of-chinese-ftc-2000g-jet/amp/

== Inventory ==
=== Previous inventory ===
In the past some MiG-21bis, L-39C Albatros, J-6C, MiG-17F, J-5, MiG-15UTI and CM.170R Magister were operational. These aircraft in 2023 could be seen on the ground at Phnom Penh International Airport. All fighter planes are no longer operational.

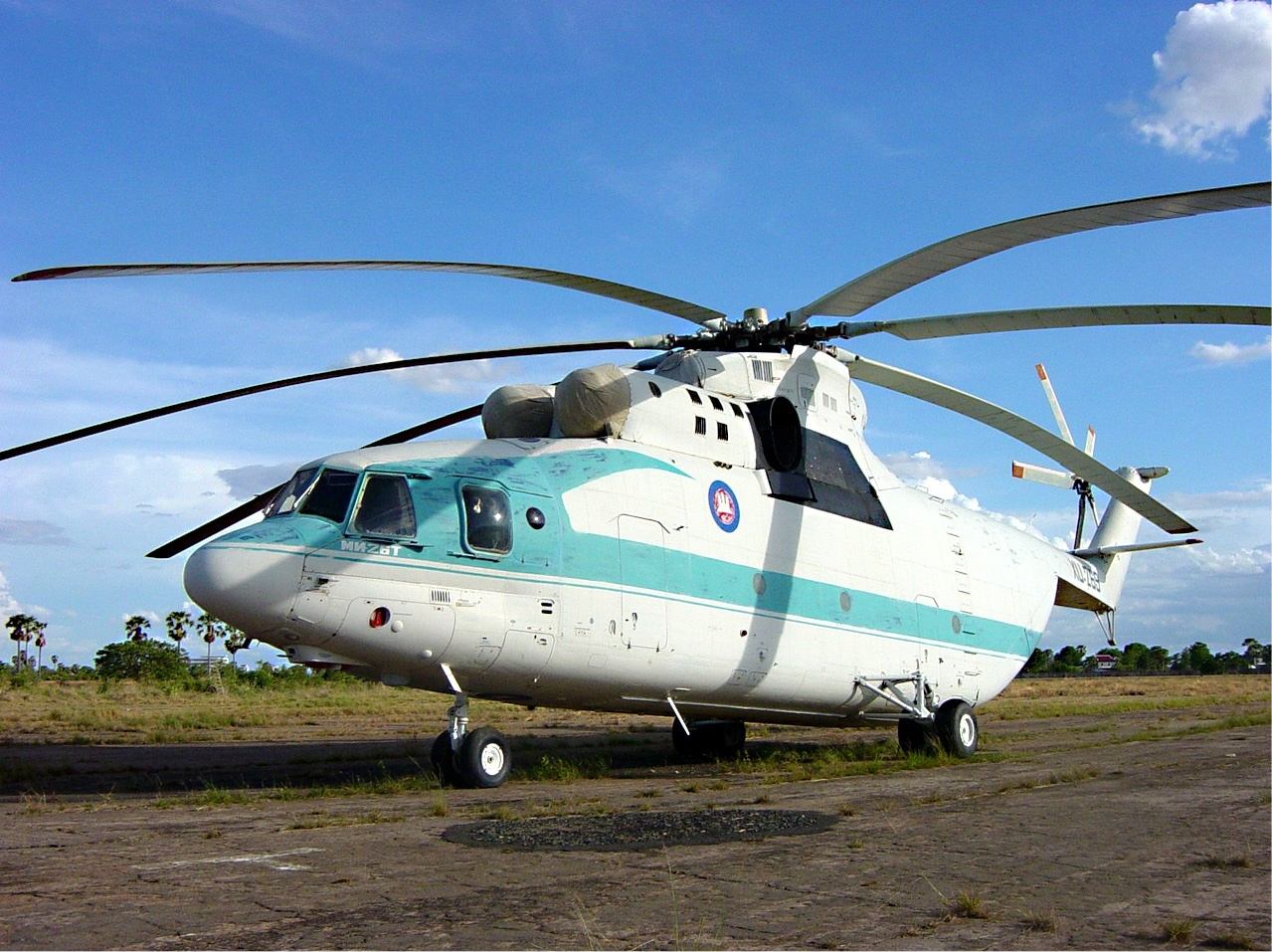
A former Mil Mi-26 Halo of the Royal Cambodian Air Force.

Transport
Aircraft	Image	Origin	Type	Variant	In service	Notes
Airbus A320		France	VIP transport		1	
Xian MA60		China	Transport		2	
Harbin Y-12		China	Transport / Utility		1	
Britten-Norman BN-2		United Kingdom	Transport		1	
Helicopters
Aircraft	Image	Origin	Type	Variant	In service	Notes
Mil Mi-8		Soviet Union	Utility		9	
Mil Mi-17		Soviet Union	Utility		6	
Harbin Z-9		China	Utility		9	
Eurocopter AS355		France	Utility		1	Stored
AgustaWestland AW109		Italy	Utility		1	

== Sport ==
The force maintains a professional association football team as one of its branches, which formerly played in the C-League.

== Ranks ==
=== Commissioned officer ranks ===
The rank insignia of commissioned officers.

Rank group	General / flag officers				Senior officers			Junior officers
Royal Cambodian Air Force
Royal Cambodian Air Force	នាយឧត្ដមសេនីយ៍ Neay utdamsenei	ឧត្ដមសេនីយ៍ឯក; Utdamsenei ek	ឧត្តមសេនីយ៍ទោ Utdamsenei tou	ឧត្តមសេនីយ៍ត្រី Utdamsenei trei	វរសេនីយ៍ឯក; Veareasenei ek	វរសេនីយ៍ទោ Veareasenei tou	វរសេនីយ៍ត្រី Veareasenei trei	អនុសេនីយ៍ឯក; Anusenei ek	អនុសេនីយ៍ទោ Anusenei tou	អនុសេនីយ៍ត្រី Anusenei trei

=== Other ranks ===
The rank insignia of non-commissioned officers and enlisted personnel.

Rank group	Senior NCOs					Junior NCOs		Enlisted
Royal Cambodian Air Force
Royal Cambodian Air Force	ព្រឹន្ទបាលឯក; Pruentobal ek	ព្រឹន្ទបាលទោ Pruentobal tou	ពលបាលឯក; Polobal ek	ពលបាលទោ Polobal tou	ពលបាលត្រី Polobal trei	នាយឯក; Neay ek	នាយទោ Neay tou	ពលឯក; Pol ek	ពលទោ Pol tou

== See also ==
- Cambodian Civil War
- Khmer National Armed Forces
- Khmer Air Force
- Royal Cambodian Army
- Royal Cambodian Armed Forces
- Royal Cambodian Navy
- Weapons of the Cambodian Civil War
