= Royal Cambodian Armed Forces =

Combined military forces of Cambodia

- កងយោធពលខេមរភូមិន្ទ
- Emblem of the Royal Cambodian Armed Forces

- Flag of the Royal Cambodian Armed Forces
- Motto: ជាតិ សាសនា ព្រះមហាក្សត្រ (transl. Nation, Religion, King)
- Founded: 9 November 1953; 73 years ago
- Current form: 24 September 1993; 33 years ago
- Service branches: Royal Cambodian Army; Royal Cambodian Navy; Royal Cambodian Air Force; Royal Gendarmerie of Cambodia
- Headquarters: Ministry of National Defence, Georgi Dimitrov Blvd, Phnom Penh 12156; RCAF High Command Headquarter

Leadership
- Supreme Commander of the Armed Forces: King Norodom Sihamoni
- Prime Minister: (Cambodia) General Hun Manet
- Minister of National Defence: (Cambodia) General Tea Seiha
- Commander-in-Chief: (Cambodia) General Vong Pisen

Personnel
- Active personnel: 124,300
- Reserve personnel: 100,000

Expenditure
- Budget: ៛2.903 trillion $739 million (2025)
- Percent of GDP: 1.47% of GDP

Industry
- Foreign suppliers: China; Czech Republic; Hungary; India; Indonesia; Poland; Russia; Ukraine; Vietnam

Related articles
- History: Military history of Cambodia
- Ranks: Military ranks of the Royal Cambodian Armed Forces

The Royal Cambodian Armed Forces (RCAF; Khmer: កងយោធពលខេមរភូមិន្ទ, romanised: Kang Youtheapol Khemaraphumin) is Cambodia's national military force. The Supreme Commander-in-Chief is King Norodom Sihamoni. Since 2018, General Vong Pisen has been the Commander-in-Chief of the RCAF as head of the Army, Navy, Air Force and the Gendarmerie. The armed forces operate under the jurisdiction of the Ministry of National Defence. Under the country's constitution, the RCAF is charged with protecting the sovereignty and territorial integrity of the Kingdom of Cambodia.

It was created in 1993 by a merger of the Cambodian People's Armed Forces (CPAF) and the National Army of Democratic Kampuchea (NADK) which included the Khmer Rouge, the Khmer People's National Liberation Front (KPNLF) and the National United Front for an Independent, Neutral, Peaceful and Cooperative Cambodia (Front uni national pour un Cambodge indépendant, neutre, pacifique, et coopératif, FUNCINPEC). The forerunner of the CPAF was the Kampuchean People's Revolutionary Armed Forces (KPRAF), established in 1979 with support from the People's Army of Vietnam (PAVN).

== History ==
=== Royal Cambodian Armed Forces (RCAF) ===
The RCAF was established in 1993 after the democratic election of a government consisting of two prime ministers. The armed forces of all parties except the NADK were integrated into a national armed force.

To resolve security problems, the government began a "Win-Win policy" in mid-1995 of national reconciliation and unity efforts under the Monarchy of Cambodia. Defections of NADK units began in early 1996 up until the death of Pol Pot in 1998.

== Branches ==
The RCAF has four branches: the Royal Cambodian Army, the Royal Cambodian Navy, the Royal Cambodian Air Force and the Royal Gendarmerie of Cambodia.

The Royal Cambodian Army (RCA) is the largest RCAF branch, with troops stationed in each of the country's 25 provinces. The Royal Cambodian Navy (RCN), the second-largest branch and operates in the Gulf of Thailand, along the Mekong and Bassac rivers and in the Tonlé Sap lake. The Royal Cambodian Air Force (RCAF), the smallest service branch with 5,000 members, operates in every province which has an airport. The Royal Gendarmerie is the national gendarmerie force of the Kingdom of Cambodia. It is a branch of the RCAF and it is responsible for the maintenance of public order and internal security. It has a strength of 30,000 members deployed in all provinces.

== See also ==
- History of Cambodia
- Cambodian Civil War
