= Ukrainian Sea Guard =

Coast guard of Ukraine

Sea Guard of the State Border Guard Service of Ukraine Морська охорона Державної прикордонної служби України
- Emblem

- Racing stripe

- Ensign

- Pennant

Agency overview
- Formed: 1991

Jurisdictional structure
- Operations jurisdiction: Ukraine
- Governing body: Ministry of Internal Affairs
- Constituting instrument: Law of Ukraine about State Border Guard Service of Ukraine 03.04.2003 № 661-IV
- Specialist jurisdiction: Coastal patrol, marine border protection, marine search and rescue

Operational structure
- Parent agency: SBGSU

Notables
- Significant operation: Russian invasion of Ukraine
- Anniversary: 28 May

Website
- www.pvu.gov.ua

The Ukrainian Sea Guard (Ukrainian: Морська охорона, romanized: Morska okhorona, pronounced [morˈsʲkɑ oxoˈrɔnɐ]; fully titled – Ukrainian: Морська охорона Державної прикордонної служби України, lit. 'Sea Guard of the State Border Guard Service of Ukraine', pronounced [morˈsʲkɑ oxoˈrɔnɐ derˈʒɑu̯noji prɪkorˈdɔnːoji ˈsluʒbɪ ʊkrɐˈjinɪ]) is the coast guard service of Ukraine, subordinated to the State Border Guard Service.

== History ==
The creation of the Sea Guard began simultaneously with the creation of the State Border Guard Service of Ukraine.

After the proclamation of the Republic of Crimea, on March 18, 2014, the State Border Service began the withdrawal of the Sea Guard from the Crimea.

Since 1999, ships and boats of the Sea Guard have been numbered with the prefix BG. Sea Guard vessels bear the Морська охорона inscription on their boards.

== Organization ==
The Sea Guard is the local successor of the Soviet Border Troops Naval Units that were similarly responsible for coast guard tasks. However, there were some interchanges in units, ships and personnel between the Sea Guard and the Ukrainian Navy.

The Sea Guard operates four sea guard detachments: in Balaklava, Odesa, Izmail and Kerch; a sea guard cutters division in Mariupol; a special-purpose sea guard cutters division in Yalta; and a riverine Dnieper sea guard cutters division in Kyiv.

Sea guard administration is split between the Azov-Black seas regional administration in Simferopol and the Southern regional administration in Odesa.

=== Squads of Marine Security ===
- Mariupol Sea Guard Detachment (from the Cape of Mehanom across the strait of Kerch and the Sea of Azov to administrative border between Zaporizhia and Donetsk regions)
- Izmail Sea Guard Detachment
- Odessa Sea Guard Detachment (Southern regional administration)

== Personnel ==
Service personnel of the Sea Guard wear either a black uniform similar to the Ukrainian Navy, but decorated with some green elements (traditional for border guard), or a common uniform of the Border Guard Service, while officers wear, since the 2010s, Western style sleeve insignia featuring the executive curl.

== Battle fleet ==
=== Major vessels ===
Sea Guard vessels bear the Морська охорона inscription on their boards.

Class	Photo	Type	Ships	Displacement (Note: Full load (in long tons)) (Note: Figures are accurate to no more than 2 decimal places)	Origin	Commissioned	Note
Warship (1 in service)
Pauk		Anti-submarine corvette	BG-50 Hryhoriy Kuropyatnykov	580	(Soviet Union) Yaroslavl	1984	
Fast attack craft (6 in service)
Stenka		Patrol boats	BG-57 Mykolaiv (Note: Previously named PSKR-722)	245	(Soviet Union) Almaz	1988	
Stenka		Patrol boats	BG-63 Pavlo Derzhavin (Note: Previously named PSKR-720)	245	(Soviet Union) Almaz	1987	
Stenka		Patrol boats	BG-62 Podillya (Note: Previously named PSKR-709)	245	(Soviet Union) Almaz	1983	
Shmel		River gunboats	BG-82 Lubny	77	(Soviet Union) Zaliv Shipbuilding yard	1972	
Shmel		River gunboats	BG-83 Nizhyn	77	(Soviet Union) Zaliv Shipbuilding yard	1968	
Shmel		River gunboats	BG-84 Izmayil	77	(Soviet Union) Zaliv Shipbuilding yard	1969	
Patrol ships (11 in service)
Orlan		Patrol gunboat	BG-200 Balaklava	42.5	(Ukraine) More	2012	Was intended to replace the Zhuk-class patrol boats
Zhuk 1400M (Grif)		Small patrol gunboats	BG-101 KaMO-509 (Note: Previously named PSKA-517)	39.7	(Soviet Union) More	1988	1 unidentified Zhuk 1400M captured by Russia after the Battle of Berdiansk; 1 unidentified Zhuk 1400M damaged and captured by Russia during the Siege of Mariupol; In 2020, KaMO-514, Liubomyr and KaMO-522 were reported to belong to a detachment east of the Kerch Strait - prior to the Russian invasion of Ukraine
Zhuk 1400M (Grif)		Small patrol gunboats	BG-103 KaMO-511 (Note: Previously named PSKA-529)	39.7	(Soviet Union) More	1987	1 unidentified Zhuk 1400M captured by Russia after the Battle of Berdiansk; 1 unidentified Zhuk 1400M damaged and captured by Russia during the Siege of Mariupol; In 2020, KaMO-514, Liubomyr and KaMO-522 were reported to belong to a detachment east of the Kerch Strait - prior to the Russian invasion of Ukraine
Zhuk 1400M (Grif)		Small patrol gunboats	BG-106 Zlatokray (Note: Previously named PSKA-550, then KaMO-515)	39.7	(Soviet Union) / (Ukraine) More	1992	1 unidentified Zhuk 1400M captured by Russia after the Battle of Berdiansk; 1 unidentified Zhuk 1400M damaged and captured by Russia during the Siege of Mariupol; In 2020, KaMO-514, Liubomyr and KaMO-522 were reported to belong to a detachment east of the Kerch Strait - prior to the Russian invasion of Ukraine
Zhuk 1400M (Grif)		Small patrol gunboats	BG-107 KaMO-516 (Note: Previously named PSKA-514)	39.7	(Soviet Union) / (Ukraine) More	1992	1 unidentified Zhuk 1400M captured by Russia after the Battle of Berdiansk; 1 unidentified Zhuk 1400M damaged and captured by Russia during the Siege of Mariupol; In 2020, KaMO-514, Liubomyr and KaMO-522 were reported to belong to a detachment east of the Kerch Strait - prior to the Russian invasion of Ukraine
Zhuk 1400M (Grif)		Small patrol gunboats	BG-109 Nemyriv (Note: Previously named KaMO-518)	39.7	(Soviet Union) / (Ukraine) More	1992	1 unidentified Zhuk 1400M captured by Russia after the Battle of Berdiansk; 1 unidentified Zhuk 1400M damaged and captured by Russia during the Siege of Mariupol; In 2020, KaMO-514, Liubomyr and KaMO-522 were reported to belong to a detachment east of the Kerch Strait - prior to the Russian invasion of Ukraine
Zhuk 1400M (Grif)		Small patrol gunboats	BG-111 Odesa (Note: Previously named KaMO-520)	39.7	(Soviet Union) / (Ukraine) More	1992	1 unidentified Zhuk 1400M captured by Russia after the Battle of Berdiansk; 1 unidentified Zhuk 1400M damaged and captured by Russia during the Siege of Mariupol; In 2020, KaMO-514, Liubomyr and KaMO-522 were reported to belong to a detachment east of the Kerch Strait - prior to the Russian invasion of Ukraine
Zhuk 1400M (Grif)		Small patrol gunboats	BG-115 Ternopil (Note: Previously named KaMO-523)	39.7	(Soviet Union) / (Ukraine) More	1993	1 unidentified Zhuk 1400M captured by Russia after the Battle of Berdiansk; 1 unidentified Zhuk 1400M damaged and captured by Russia during the Siege of Mariupol; In 2020, KaMO-514, Liubomyr and KaMO-522 were reported to belong to a detachment east of the Kerch Strait - prior to the Russian invasion of Ukraine
Zhuk 1400M (Grif)		Small patrol gunboats	BG-116 Darnytisa (Note: Previously named KaMO-524)	39.7	(Soviet Union) / (Ukraine) More	1993	1 unidentified Zhuk 1400M captured by Russia after the Battle of Berdiansk; 1 unidentified Zhuk 1400M damaged and captured by Russia during the Siege of Mariupol; In 2020, KaMO-514, Liubomyr and KaMO-522 were reported to belong to a detachment east of the Kerch Strait - prior to the Russian invasion of Ukraine
Zhuk 1400M (Grif)		Small patrol gunboats	BG-117 Vatutinets (Note: Previously named KaMO-525)	39.7	(Soviet Union) / (Ukraine) More	1993	1 unidentified Zhuk 1400M captured by Russia after the Battle of Berdiansk; 1 unidentified Zhuk 1400M damaged and captured by Russia during the Siege of Mariupol; In 2020, KaMO-514, Liubomyr and KaMO-522 were reported to belong to a detachment east of the Kerch Strait - prior to the Russian invasion of Ukraine
Cutters (29-32 in service)
PO-2 (project 376)		Diving cutter	BG-801 PSKA-155 (Note: project RVM376A)	41.1	(Soviet Union) Yaroslavl	1966	
PO-2 (project 376)		Harbor patrol	BG-612 PSKA-612 (Note: project R376U)	46.89	(Soviet Union) Sosnovka (Note: Commissioned in the Soviet Union; this is the most likely shipyard according to a linked source)	1968 (Note: Most likely date of commission according to a linked source)	PSKA-612 and PSKA-613 may still be undergoing repair
PO-2 (project 376)		Harbor patrol	BG-613 PSKA-613	46.89	Soviet Union		PSKA-612 and PSKA-613 may still be undergoing repair
(project 371) (Note: All are of project 371U)		Small patrol boats	Head no. 628	9.83	(Soviet Union) Vympel Shipyard		
(project 371)		Small patrol boats	Head no. 729	9.83	(Soviet Union) Vympel Shipyard		
(project 371)		Small patrol boats	Head no. 871	9.83	(Soviet Union) Vympel Shipyard		
(project 371)		Small patrol boats	BG-803	9.83	(Soviet Union) Vympel Shipyard	1990	
Kalkan-P (project 09104)		Patrol cutters	BG-07	7.74	(Ukraine) Mykolaiv		
Kalkan-P (project 09104)		Patrol cutters	BG-08	7.74	(Ukraine) Mykolaiv	2002 (Note: Launched in that year. Unclear when first commissioned)	
Kalkan-P (project 09104)		Patrol cutters	BG-12	7.74	(Ukraine) Mykolaiv	2008 (Note: Built in that year. Unclear when first commissioned)	
Kalkan (project 50030) (Note: Including Kalkan-M)		Patrol cutters	BG-305	7.8	(Ukraine) More		1 unidentified Kalkan captured by Russia during the Siege of Mariupol; In 2018, BG-303 and BG-305 were reported to belong to a detachment east of the Kerch Strait - prior to the Russian invasion of Ukraine
Kalkan (project 50030)		Patrol cutters	BG-320	7.8	(Ukraine) More		1 unidentified Kalkan captured by Russia during the Siege of Mariupol; In 2018, BG-303 and BG-305 were reported to belong to a detachment east of the Kerch Strait - prior to the Russian invasion of Ukraine
Kalkan (project 50030)		Patrol cutters	BG-333	7.8	(Ukraine) More		1 unidentified Kalkan captured by Russia during the Siege of Mariupol; In 2018, BG-303 and BG-305 were reported to belong to a detachment east of the Kerch Strait - prior to the Russian invasion of Ukraine
Kalkan (project 50030)		Patrol cutters	BG-503	7.8	(Ukraine) More		1 unidentified Kalkan captured by Russia during the Siege of Mariupol; In 2018, BG-303 and BG-305 were reported to belong to a detachment east of the Kerch Strait - prior to the Russian invasion of Ukraine
Kalkan (project 50030)		Patrol cutters	BG-603	7.8	(Ukraine) More		1 unidentified Kalkan captured by Russia during the Siege of Mariupol; In 2018, BG-303 and BG-305 were reported to belong to a detachment east of the Kerch Strait - prior to the Russian invasion of Ukraine
Kalkan (project 50030)		Patrol cutters	BG-604	7.8	(Ukraine) More		1 unidentified Kalkan captured by Russia during the Siege of Mariupol; In 2018, BG-303 and BG-305 were reported to belong to a detachment east of the Kerch Strait - prior to the Russian invasion of Ukraine
Kalkan (project 50030)		Patrol cutters	BG-807 Sailor Mykola Kushnirov	7.8	(Ukraine) More		1 unidentified Kalkan captured by Russia during the Siege of Mariupol; In 2018, BG-303 and BG-305 were reported to belong to a detachment east of the Kerch Strait - prior to the Russian invasion of Ukraine
Kalkan (project 50030)		Patrol cutters	BG-808	7.8	(Ukraine) More		1 unidentified Kalkan captured by Russia during the Siege of Mariupol; In 2018, BG-303 and BG-305 were reported to belong to a detachment east of the Kerch Strait - prior to the Russian invasion of Ukraine
Aist (project 1398B)		Small patrol boats	BG-609	20			Four of six Aist-class ships in the Ukrainian Navy and Sea Guard prior to the Russian invasion of Ukraine
Aist (project 1398B)		Small patrol boats	BG-610	20			Four of six Aist-class ships in the Ukrainian Navy and Sea Guard prior to the Russian invasion of Ukraine
Aist (project 1398B)		Small patrol boats	BG-611	20			Four of six Aist-class ships in the Ukrainian Navy and Sea Guard prior to the Russian invasion of Ukraine
Aist (project 1398B)		Small patrol boats	BG-815	20			Four of six Aist-class ships in the Ukrainian Navy and Sea Guard prior to the Russian invasion of Ukraine
(project 363)		Support boat	BG-806 RKZ-461	28.7	(Soviet Union) Yaroslavl	1952	May still be undergoing repair
UMS 1000		Patrol cutters	BG-15	7.4	(Ukraine) Kyiv	2011	Series of small patrol cutters developed by UMS boats In 2018, BG-25 was reported to belong to a detachment east of the Kerch Strait - prior to the Russian invasion of Ukraine
UMS 1000		Patrol cutters	BG-16	7.4	(Ukraine) Kyiv	2012	Series of small patrol cutters developed by UMS boats In 2018, BG-25 was reported to belong to a detachment east of the Kerch Strait - prior to the Russian invasion of Ukraine
UMS 1000		Patrol cutters	BG-17	7.4	(Ukraine) Kyiv	2012	Series of small patrol cutters developed by UMS boats In 2018, BG-25 was reported to belong to a detachment east of the Kerch Strait - prior to the Russian invasion of Ukraine
UMS 1000		Patrol cutters	BG-19	7.4	(Ukraine) Kyiv	2012	Series of small patrol cutters developed by UMS boats In 2018, BG-25 was reported to belong to a detachment east of the Kerch Strait - prior to the Russian invasion of Ukraine
UMS 1000		Patrol cutters	BG-20	7.4	(Ukraine) Kyiv	2013	Series of small patrol cutters developed by UMS boats In 2018, BG-25 was reported to belong to a detachment east of the Kerch Strait - prior to the Russian invasion of Ukraine
UMS 1000		Patrol cutters	BG-21	7.4	(Ukraine) Kyiv	2013	Series of small patrol cutters developed by UMS boats In 2018, BG-25 was reported to belong to a detachment east of the Kerch Strait - prior to the Russian invasion of Ukraine
UMS 600		Patrol cutters	BG-724 (Note: UMS 600 Cruiser)	1.46	(Ukraine) Kyiv		In 2020, was reported to belong to a detachment west of the Kerch Strait - prior to the Russian invasion of Ukraine
UMS 600		Patrol cutters	1 vessel (Note: UMS 600, also known as UMS 600 PL)	1.32 (Note: Displacement of UMS 600 (but not of UMS 600 Cruiser variant))	(Ukraine) Kyiv		In 2018, 1 vessel was reported to belong to a detachment east of the Kerch Strait - prior to the Russian invasion of Ukraine
Special purpose RIB (5 in service)
BRIG Navigator N730M		Rigid inflatable boat	1 vessel	2.56	Ukraine	2019-2020	
BRIG Navigator N700M		Rigid inflatable boat	BG-43	2.46	Ukraine		
BRIG Navigator N700M		Rigid inflatable boat	BG-42	2.46	Ukraine		
Safe Boat 27		Rigid inflatable boats	BG-1002	5.15	United States	2019	
Safe Boat 27		Rigid inflatable boats	BG-1003	5.15	United States	2019	
Auxiliary vessels
Tug (1 in service)
Titan		Tug	BG-60 Titan	1,025	(Norway) Georg Eides Sønner, Høylandsbygd	1974	Resumed service after repairs in 2021
Airboat (1 in service)
Panther Airboats-design airboat		Airboat	BG-717		(United States) Cocoa, Florida		
Motor yachts (3 in service)
Galia-640		Small patrol boats	BG-707		(Poland) Galeon Yachts, Straszyn		In 2018, 1 vessel was reported to belong to a detachment east of the Kerch Strait - prior to the Russian invasion of Ukraine
Galia-640		Small patrol boats	BG-709		(Poland) Galeon Yachts, Straszyn		In 2018, 1 vessel was reported to belong to a detachment east of the Kerch Strait - prior to the Russian invasion of Ukraine
Galia-280		Small patrol boat	BG-731		(Poland) Galeon Yachts, Straszyn		
Training (1 in service)
Chaika (project 1360)		Training vessel	BG-01 Krym	256	(Soviet Union) Almaz	1978	Converted from patrol boat in 2020
Special purpose boats and barges (4 in service)
Celik		Border support ship	BG-58 Amethyst		Turkey		Converted from fishing vessel in 2000
(project R-140)		Barracks ship	RSZ-20	405.2	(Soviet Union) Sokol	1984	
(project 824M)		Floating dock	PZh-61M	1,386	Soviet Union		
(project 889A)		Floating dock	Head no. 717	1,354	(Bulgaria) Burgas		

== Prospective additions ==
Class	Photo	Type	Ships	Displacement	Origin	Commissioned	Note
Awaiting repair
Kalkan-P (project 09104)		Patrol cutter	BG-10	7.74	(Ukraine) Mykolaiv	2006	
Awaiting delivery
Ocea FPB 98		Patrol boats	BG-202	120	(France) Ocea Shipbuilding		First units expected to come into service in 2022; already launched that year Arrived in Malta in May 2023 en route to Ukraine
Ocea FPB 98		Patrol boats	BG-203	120	(France) Ocea Shipbuilding		First units expected to come into service in 2022; already launched that year Arrived in Malta in May 2023 en route to Ukraine
Under construction
Ocea FPB 98		Patrol boats	BG-201	120	(Ukraine) Nibulon / (France) Ocea Shipbuilding (Note: 5 to be built at Nibulon)		20 vessels originally planned; first laid down in 2020; BG-201 already launched; first units expected to come into service in 2022
Ocea FPB 98		Patrol boats	BG-204	120	(Ukraine) Nibulon / (France) Ocea Shipbuilding		20 vessels originally planned; first laid down in 2020; BG-201 already launched; first units expected to come into service in 2022
Ocea FPB 98		Patrol boats	BG-205	120	(Ukraine) Nibulon / (France) Ocea Shipbuilding		20 vessels originally planned; first laid down in 2020; BG-201 already launched; first units expected to come into service in 2022
Ocea FPB 98		Patrol boats	BG-207	120	(Ukraine) Nibulon / (France) Ocea Shipbuilding		20 vessels originally planned; first laid down in 2020; BG-201 already launched; first units expected to come into service in 2022
38 Defiant		Pilothouse patrol boats	10 (Note: 38 Defiant pilothouse) under construction		(United States) Metal Shark		In June 2022, Metal Shark announced these boats were under construction as part of an accelerated strategy to support Ukraine which began in 2019. In January of the same year, the Sea Guard announced its expectation to receive 11 Metal Shark boats of the 38 Defiant and 36 Fearless classes in 2022
38 Defiant		Center console patrol boats	4 (Note: 38 Defiant center console) under construction		(United States) Metal Shark		In June 2022, Metal Shark announced these boats were under construction as part of an accelerated strategy to support Ukraine which began in 2019. In January of the same year, the Sea Guard announced its expectation to receive 11 Metal Shark boats of the 38 Defiant and 36 Fearless classes in 2022
36 Fearless		High-performance military interceptor boats	3 under construction		(United States) Metal Shark		In June 2022, Metal Shark announced these boats were under construction as part of an accelerated strategy to support Ukraine which began in 2019. In January of the same year, the Sea Guard announced its expectation to receive 11 Metal Shark boats of the 38 Defiant and 36 Fearless classes in 2022

== Decommissioned, sold, destroyed, captured ==
(Note: Not counting those recommissioned by or sent to the Ukrainian Navy or the Sea Guard’s parent agency (for border detachments))

Class	Photo	Type	Ships	Displacement	Origin	Commissioned	Decommissioned
Warships (2)
Pauk		Anti-submarine corvettes	BG-52 Hryhoriy Hnatenko	540	(Soviet Union) Yaroslavl	1987	Both ships were ready to be decommissioned and were left in Balaklava after the Russian annexation of Crimea; Hryhoriy Hnatenko tugged to Feodosia and scuttled in 2015. Raised and transferred to Sevastopol. Used as target to missiles and scuttled
Pauk		Anti-submarine corvettes	BG-51 Poltava (Note: Previously named PSKR-813)	540	(Soviet Union) Yaroslavl	1987	Both ships were ready to be decommissioned and were left in Balaklava after the Russian annexation of Crimea; Hryhoriy Hnatenko tugged to Feodosia and scuttled in 2015. Raised and transferred to Sevastopol. Used as target to missiles and scuttled
Fast attack craft (19)
Stenka		Patrol boats	PSKR-623	245	(Soviet Union) Almaz		PSKR-623 decommissioned in 1993; subsequently scrapped
Stenka		Patrol boats	PSKR-630	245	(Soviet Union) Almaz		PSKR-630 and PSKR-636 decommissioned in the mid-1990s; PSKR-630 converted to civil vessel and PSKR-636 scrapped
Stenka		Patrol boats	PSKR-636	245	(Soviet Union) Almaz		PSKR-630 and PSKR-636 decommissioned in the mid-1990s; PSKR-630 converted to civil vessel and PSKR-636 scrapped
Stenka		Patrol boats	Transcarpathia (Note: Previously named PSKR-648)	245	(Soviet Union) Almaz	1976	Transcarpathia sold to Georgia and subsequently renamed in 1998; scrapped in 2006
Stenka		Patrol boats	PSKR-645	245	(Soviet Union) Almaz	1975	PSKR-645 decommissioned in 1998; subsequently scrapped
Stenka		Patrol boats	Anastasia (Note: Previously named PSKR-629)	245	(Soviet Union) Almaz		Anastasia, PSKR-643 and Heroyi Kerchi decommissioned in 1999; Anastasia sold to Georgia and renamed in the same year; subsequent to decommissioning, PSKR-643 and Heroyi Kerchi scrapped
Stenka		Patrol boats	PSKR-643	245	(Soviet Union) Almaz	1975	Anastasia, PSKR-643 and Heroyi Kerchi decommissioned in 1999; Anastasia sold to Georgia and renamed in the same year; subsequent to decommissioning, PSKR-643 and Heroyi Kerchi scrapped
Stenka		Patrol boats	BG-30 Heroyi Kerchi (Note: Previously named PSKR-642)	245	(Soviet Union) Almaz	1981	Anastasia, PSKR-643 and Heroyi Kerchi decommissioned in 1999; Anastasia sold to Georgia and renamed in the same year; subsequent to decommissioning, PSKR-643 and Heroyi Kerchi scrapped
Stenka		Patrol boats	PSKR-635	245	(Soviet Union) Almaz		PSKR-635 decommissioned in 2000; subsequently scrapped
Stenka		Patrol boats	BG-60 Zaporizka Sich (Note: Previously named PSKR-650)	245	(Soviet Union) Almaz	1975	Zaporizka Sich decommissioned in 2004; subsequently scrapped
Stenka		Patrol boats	BG-56 Volyn (Note: Previously named PSKR-637)	245	(Soviet Union) Almaz	1974	Volyn decommissioned in 2007; subsequently scrapped
Stenka		Patrol boats	BG-61 Odesa (Note: Previously named PSKR-652)	245	(Soviet Union) Almaz	1975	Odesa decommissioned in 2011 and converted to civil vessel; scrapped in 2016
Stenka		Patrol boats	BG-31 Bukovyna (Note: Previously named PSKR-702)	245	(Soviet Union) Almaz	1976	Bukovyna lost to Russia during the annexation of Crimea; scuttled as target for missiles in 2016
Stenka		Patrol boats	BG-32 Donbas (Note: Previously named PSKR-705)	245	(Soviet Union) Almaz	1982	Donbas sunk during the Siege of Mariupol
Muravey		Anti-submarine hydrofoils	PSKR-103	221	(Soviet Union) More	1983	PSKR-103 decommissioned in 1996; subsequently scrapped
Muravey		Anti-submarine hydrofoils	BG-53 PSKR-108	221	(Soviet Union) More	1990	PSKR-108 and PSKR-105 decommissioned in 2000; both subsequently scrapped
Muravey		Anti-submarine hydrofoils	BG-54 PSKR-105	221	(Soviet Union) More	1985	PSKR-108 and PSKR-105 decommissioned in 2000; both subsequently scrapped
Muravey		Anti-submarine hydrofoils	BG-55 Halychyna (Note: Previously named PSKR-115)	221	(Soviet Union) / (Ukraine) More	1993	Halychyna decommissioned in 2010; subsequently scrapped
Shmel		River gunboat	BG-81 Kaniv	77	(Soviet Union) Zaliv Shipbuilding yard	1971	Decommissioned in 2012
Patrol ships (29)
Koral (project 58160)		Large patrol boat	1 vessel	310	(Ukraine) More	Under construction when captured	Lost to Russia during the annexation of Crimea
Zhuk 1400M (Grif)		Small patrol gunboats	PSKA-502 (Note: Previously named PSKA-579)	39.7	(Soviet Union) More	1981	PSKA-502, PSKA-503, PSKA-505, PSKA-506, PSKA-507, KaMO-504 and PSKA-513 decommissioned in the mid-1990s (at earliest, 1994); then PSKA-502 transferred to Artek (camp) and PSKA-506 converted to a civil vessel
Zhuk 1400M (Grif)		Small patrol gunboats	PSKA-503 (Note: Previously named PSKA-574)	39.7	(Soviet Union) More	1981	PSKA-502, PSKA-503, PSKA-505, PSKA-506, PSKA-507, KaMO-504 and PSKA-513 decommissioned in the mid-1990s (at earliest, 1994); then PSKA-502 transferred to Artek (camp) and PSKA-506 converted to a civil vessel
Zhuk 1400M (Grif)		Small patrol gunboats	PSKA-505 (Note: Previously named PSKA-526)	39.7	(Soviet Union) Batumi	1982	PSKA-502, PSKA-503, PSKA-505, PSKA-506, PSKA-507, KaMO-504 and PSKA-513 decommissioned in the mid-1990s (at earliest, 1994); then PSKA-502 transferred to Artek (camp) and PSKA-506 converted to a civil vessel
Zhuk 1400M (Grif)		Small patrol gunboats	PSKA-506 (Note: Previously named PSKA-527)	39.7	(Soviet Union) More	1982	PSKA-502, PSKA-503, PSKA-505, PSKA-506, PSKA-507, KaMO-504 and PSKA-513 decommissioned in the mid-1990s (at earliest, 1994); then PSKA-502 transferred to Artek (camp) and PSKA-506 converted to a civil vessel
Zhuk 1400M (Grif)		Small patrol gunboats	PSKA-507 (Note: Previously named PSKA-528)	39.7	(Soviet Union) More	1982	PSKA-502, PSKA-503, PSKA-505, PSKA-506, PSKA-507, KaMO-504 and PSKA-513 decommissioned in the mid-1990s (at earliest, 1994); then PSKA-502 transferred to Artek (camp) and PSKA-506 converted to a civil vessel
Zhuk 1400M (Grif)		Small patrol gunboats	KaMO-504	39.7	(Soviet Union) Batumi	1984	PSKA-502, PSKA-503, PSKA-505, PSKA-506, PSKA-507, KaMO-504 and PSKA-513 decommissioned in the mid-1990s (at earliest, 1994); then PSKA-502 transferred to Artek (camp) and PSKA-506 converted to a civil vessel
Zhuk 1400M (Grif)		Small patrol gunboats	PSKA-513 (Note: Previously named PSKA-538)	39.7	(Soviet Union) More	1990	PSKA-502, PSKA-503, PSKA-505, PSKA-506, PSKA-507, KaMO-504 and PSKA-513 decommissioned in the mid-1990s (at earliest, 1994); then PSKA-502 transferred to Artek (camp) and PSKA-506 converted to a civil vessel
Zhuk 1400M (Grif)		Small patrol gunboats	PSKA-528	39.7	(Ukraine) More	Never commissioned	Construction of PSKA-528, PSKA-529, PSKA-530, PSKA-531, PSKA-532 and PSKA-533 never completed; subsequently abandoned, but PSKA-528 installed as a monument in Feodosiya in 2010; PSKA-528 subsequently lost to Russia during the annexation of Crimea and decommissioned (by Russia) in its role as a monument in 2018
Zhuk 1400M (Grif)		Small patrol gunboats	PSKA-529	39.7	(Ukraine) More	Never commissioned	Construction of PSKA-528, PSKA-529, PSKA-530, PSKA-531, PSKA-532 and PSKA-533 never completed; subsequently abandoned, but PSKA-528 installed as a monument in Feodosiya in 2010; PSKA-528 subsequently lost to Russia during the annexation of Crimea and decommissioned (by Russia) in its role as a monument in 2018
Zhuk 1400M (Grif)		Small patrol gunboats	PSKA-530	39.7	(Ukraine) More	Never commissioned	Construction of PSKA-528, PSKA-529, PSKA-530, PSKA-531, PSKA-532 and PSKA-533 never completed; subsequently abandoned, but PSKA-528 installed as a monument in Feodosiya in 2010; PSKA-528 subsequently lost to Russia during the annexation of Crimea and decommissioned (by Russia) in its role as a monument in 2018
Zhuk 1400M (Grif)		Small patrol gunboats	PSKA-531	39.7	(Ukraine) More	Never commissioned	Construction of PSKA-528, PSKA-529, PSKA-530, PSKA-531, PSKA-532 and PSKA-533 never completed; subsequently abandoned, but PSKA-528 installed as a monument in Feodosiya in 2010; PSKA-528 subsequently lost to Russia during the annexation of Crimea and decommissioned (by Russia) in its role as a monument in 2018
Zhuk 1400M (Grif)		Small patrol gunboats	PSKA-532	39.7	(Ukraine) More	Never commissioned	Construction of PSKA-528, PSKA-529, PSKA-530, PSKA-531, PSKA-532 and PSKA-533 never completed; subsequently abandoned, but PSKA-528 installed as a monument in Feodosiya in 2010; PSKA-528 subsequently lost to Russia during the annexation of Crimea and decommissioned (by Russia) in its role as a monument in 2018
Zhuk 1400M (Grif)		Small patrol gunboats	PSKA-533	39.7	(Ukraine) More	Never commissioned	Construction of PSKA-528, PSKA-529, PSKA-530, PSKA-531, PSKA-532 and PSKA-533 never completed; subsequently abandoned, but PSKA-528 installed as a monument in Feodosiya in 2010; PSKA-528 subsequently lost to Russia during the annexation of Crimea and decommissioned (by Russia) in its role as a monument in 2018
Zhuk 1400M (Grif)		Small patrol gunboats	BG-100 Sivash (Note: Previously named PSKA-512, then KaMO-508)	39.7	(Soviet Union) More	1987	Sivash withdrawn from service in 2008 and dismantled
Zhuk 1400M (Grif)		Small patrol gunboats	BG-102 Obolon (Note: Previously named PSKA-508, then KaMO-510)	39.7	(Soviet Union) More	1988	Obolon and KaMO-512 decommissioned in 2012; Obolon subsequently lost to Russia during the annexation of Crimea; KaMO-512 scrapped in 2021
Zhuk 1400M (Grif)		Small patrol gunboats	BG-104 KaMO-512 (Note: Previously named PSKA-531)	39.7	(Soviet Union) More	1989	Obolon and KaMO-512 decommissioned in 2012; Obolon subsequently lost to Russia during the annexation of Crimea; KaMO-512 scrapped in 2021
Zhuk 1400M (Grif)		Small patrol gunboats	BG-112 KaMO-521	39.7	(Soviet Union) / (Ukraine) More	1993	KaMO-521 lost to Russia (while out of service) during the annexation of Crimea
Zhuk 1400M (Grif)		Small patrol gunboats	BG-119 KaMO-527	39.7	(Soviet Union) / (Ukraine) More	1994	KaMO-527 destroyed near Mariupol by Russian forces in 2014
Zhuk 1400M (Grif)		Small patrol gunboats	BG-118 Arabat (Note: Previously named KaMO-526)	39.7	(Soviet Union) / (Ukraine) More	1993	Arabat and 1 unidentified Zhuk 1400M captured after the Battle of Berdiansk
Zhuk 1400M (Grif)		Small patrol gunboats	BG-108 KaMO-517 (Note: Previously named PSKA-515)	39.7	(Soviet Union) / (Ukraine) More	1992	KaMO-517 and 1 unidentified Zhuk 1400M destroyed and wrecks captured by Russia during the Siege of Mariupol
Zhuk 1400E		Small patrol gunboat	PSKA-501 (Note: Previously named PSKA-562)	40	(Soviet Union) More	1975	Decommissioned in the mid-1990s (at earliest, 1994)
Zhuk 1400		Small patrol gunboats	PSKA-555	40	(Soviet Union) More	1972	Decommissioned in the mid-1990s (at earliest, 1994)
Zhuk 1400		Small patrol gunboats	PSKA-500 (Note: Previously named PSKA-558)	40	(Soviet Union) More	1973	Decommissioned in the mid-1990s (at earliest, 1994)
Gurzuf (project 14670)		Special border patrol boats	BG-02 Lviv (Note: Previously named PKASS-53)	43.5	(Soviet Union) Batumi	1989	Lost to Russia during the annexation of Crimea
Gurzuf (project 14670)		Special border patrol boats	BG-03 Kryvyi Rih (Note: Previously named PKASS-54)	43.5	(Soviet Union) Batumi	1989	Lost to Russia during the annexation of Crimea
Chibis-2 (project 14101)		Small patrol boat	BG-616	2.2	(Soviet Union) Kama	1991	Decommissioned in 2008
Cutters (43)
PO-2 (project 376)		Diving cutters	PSKA-158 (Note: project RV376)	38	(Soviet Union) Sosnovka	1966	PSKA-158 decommissioned between 1995 and 1999 (inclusive)
PO-2 (project 376)		Diving cutters	PSKA-159	38	(Soviet Union) Sosnovka		PSKA-159 and head no. 602 decommissioned in the 1990s
PO-2 (project 376)		Diving cutters	Head no. 602	38	(Soviet Union) Sosnovka		PSKA-159 and head no. 602 decommissioned in the 1990s
PO-2 (project 376)		Diving cutters	BG-501 RK-796 (Note: project RV376U)	38.2	(Soviet Union) Sosnovka	1970	RK-796 decommissioned in 2008 and subsequently lost to Russia during the annexation of Crimea; Scrapped in 2020
(project 371)		Small patrol boats	PSKA-125	9.83			PSKA-125 and PSKA-141 decommissioned and converted to civil vessels
(project 371)		Small patrol boats	PSKA-141	9.83			PSKA-125 and PSKA-141 decommissioned and converted to civil vessels
(project 371)		Small patrol boats	Head no. 629	9.83	(Soviet Union) Vympel Shipyard		Head no. 629 sold and subsequently scrapped
(project 371)		Small patrol boats	Head no. 1255	9.83	(Soviet Union) Vympel Shipyard	1987	Head numbers 1255, 1256 and 1257 decommissioned in 2008; head no. 1257 renamed and converted to a civil vessel in the same year
(project 371)		Small patrol boats	Head no. 1256	9.83	(Soviet Union) Vympel Shipyard	1987	Head numbers 1255, 1256 and 1257 decommissioned in 2008; head no. 1257 renamed and converted to a civil vessel in the same year
(project 371)		Small patrol boats	Head no. 1257	9.83	(Soviet Union) Vympel Shipyard	1987	Head numbers 1255, 1256 and 1257 decommissioned in 2008; head no. 1257 renamed and converted to a civil vessel in the same year
(project 371)		Small patrol boats	Head no. 1637	9.83	(Soviet Union) Vympel Shipyard	1991	Head no. 1637 decommissioned in 2010
(project 371)		Small patrol boats	Head no. 1525	9.83	(Soviet Union) Vympel Shipyard	1990	Head no. 1525 decommissioned in 2012
(project 343)		Small patrol boat	PMKA-1448 (Note: project 343ME)	1.85	Soviet Union	1984	PMKA-1448 decommissioned in 2008
(project 343)		Special border patrol boats	Head no. 8203 (Note: Volga (project 13432))	1.8	Soviet Union	1982	Head numbers 8203, 8305, 8306 and 8402 lost to Russia during the annexation of Crimea and put into Russian service in the same year
(project 343)		Special border patrol boats	Head no. 8305	1.8	Soviet Union	1983	Head numbers 8203, 8305, 8306 and 8402 lost to Russia during the annexation of Crimea and put into Russian service in the same year
(project 343)		Special border patrol boats	Head no. 8306	1.8	Soviet Union	1983	Head numbers 8203, 8305, 8306 and 8402 lost to Russia during the annexation of Crimea and put into Russian service in the same year
(project 343)		Special border patrol boats	Head no. 8402	1.8	Soviet Union	1984	Head numbers 8203, 8305, 8306 and 8402 lost to Russia during the annexation of Crimea and put into Russian service in the same year
Kalkan-P (project 09104)		Patrol cutters	BG-09	7.74	(Ukraine) Mykolaiv	2006	Lost to Russia during the annexation of Crimea. BG-11 subsequently put into service with the Russian Coast Guard
Kalkan-P (project 09104)		Patrol cutters	BG-11	7.74	(Ukraine) Mykolaiv	2008	Lost to Russia during the annexation of Crimea. BG-11 subsequently put into service with the Russian Coast Guard
Kalkan (project 50030) (Note: Including Kalkan-M)		Patrol cutters	BG-504	7.8	(Ukraine) More	1997	BG-504 lost to Russia during the annexation of Crimea; BG-308, BG-310 and BG-311 captured by Russia after the Battle of Berdiansk; BG-304, BG-309 and 1 unidentified Kalkan captured by Russia during the Siege of Mariupol; BG-304 awaiting repair prior to capture
Kalkan (project 50030)		Patrol cutters	BG-308	7.8	(Ukraine) More		BG-504 lost to Russia during the annexation of Crimea; BG-308, BG-310 and BG-311 captured by Russia after the Battle of Berdiansk; BG-304, BG-309 and 1 unidentified Kalkan captured by Russia during the Siege of Mariupol; BG-304 awaiting repair prior to capture
Kalkan (project 50030)		Patrol cutters	BG-310	7.8	(Ukraine) More		BG-504 lost to Russia during the annexation of Crimea; BG-308, BG-310 and BG-311 captured by Russia after the Battle of Berdiansk; BG-304, BG-309 and 1 unidentified Kalkan captured by Russia during the Siege of Mariupol; BG-304 awaiting repair prior to capture
Kalkan (project 50030)		Patrol cutters	BG-311	7.8	(Ukraine) More		BG-504 lost to Russia during the annexation of Crimea; BG-308, BG-310 and BG-311 captured by Russia after the Battle of Berdiansk; BG-304, BG-309 and 1 unidentified Kalkan captured by Russia during the Siege of Mariupol; BG-304 awaiting repair prior to capture
Kalkan (project 50030)		Patrol cutters	BG-304	7.8	(Ukraine) More		BG-504 lost to Russia during the annexation of Crimea; BG-308, BG-310 and BG-311 captured by Russia after the Battle of Berdiansk; BG-304, BG-309 and 1 unidentified Kalkan captured by Russia during the Siege of Mariupol; BG-304 awaiting repair prior to capture
Kalkan (project 50030)		Patrol cutters	BG-309	7.8	(Ukraine) More		BG-504 lost to Russia during the annexation of Crimea; BG-308, BG-310 and BG-311 captured by Russia after the Battle of Berdiansk; BG-304, BG-309 and 1 unidentified Kalkan captured by Russia during the Siege of Mariupol; BG-304 awaiting repair prior to capture
Katran		Patrol cutter	BG-820		Soviet Union	1998	Lost to Russia during the annexation of Crimea
Aist (project 1398B)		Small patrol boats	Head no. 317	20	Soviet Union		Head no. 317 decommissioned in 1994
Aist (project 1398B)		Small patrol boats	Head no. 340	20	(Soviet Union) More		Head no. 340 sunk in 1996
Aist (project 1398B)		Small patrol boats	PMKA-202	20	(Soviet Union) Batumi	1989	PMKA-202 decommissioned in 2008
Aist (project 1398B)		Small patrol boats	Head no. 9104	20	(Soviet Union) Batumi	1991	Head no. 9104 decommissioned in 2008
Aist (project 1398B)		Small patrol boats	PMKA-610	20	(Soviet Union) Batumi	1985	PMKA-610 decommissioned in 2009
Aist (project 1398B)		Small patrol boats	Head no. 9030	20	(Soviet Union) Batumi	1991	Head no. 9030 decommissioned in 2009
Aist (project 1398B)		Small patrol boats	BG-816 PMKA-224	20	(Soviet Union) More	1990	PMKA-224 decommissioned in 2010
Aist (project 1398B)		Small patrol boats	Head no. 8908	20	(Soviet Union) Batumi	1992	Head no. 8908 decommissioned in 2012, sold to a private client and converted to a civil vessel in 2014
(project 363)		Support boat	BG-818 PSKA-300	28.7	(Soviet Union) Yaroslavl	1951	Decommissioned in 2008
UMS 1000		Patrol cutters	BG-18	7.4	(Ukraine) Kyiv	2012	BG-18 lost to Russia during the annexation of Crimea
UMS 1000		Patrol cutters	BG-14	7.4	(Ukraine) Kyiv	2011	BG-14 and BG-24 captured by Russia after the Battle of Berdiansk
UMS 1000		Patrol cutters	BG-24	7.4	(Ukraine) Kyiv	2016	BG-14 and BG-24 captured by Russia after the Battle of Berdiansk
UMS 1000		Patrol cutters	BG-22	7.4	(Ukraine) Kyiv	2014	BG-22 and BG-23 both damaged and captured by Russia during the Siege of Mariupol
UMS 1000		Patrol cutters	BG-23	7.4	(Ukraine) Kyiv	2014	BG-22 and BG-23 both damaged and captured by Russia during the Siege of Mariupol
Hvilya (project 14720)		Patrol boats	2 vessels				Lost to Russia during the annexation of Crimea
Special purpose RIB (4)
BRIG Navigator N730M		Rigid inflatable boat	1 vessel	2.56	Ukraine	2019-2020	Most likely destroyed by Russia during the Siege of Mariupol
BRIG Navigator N700M		Rigid inflatable boat	BG-40	2.46	Ukraine		Captured by Russia during the Siege of Mariupol
Heavy Duty 460		Rigid inflatable boat	1 vessel		Ukraine		Lost to Russia during the annexation of Crimea
Brig Eagle 6 (Note: 'Brig S6' referred to in a linked source is most likely an abbreviation (and possible mistranslation) of this type)		Rigid inflatable boat	1 vessel	1.79	Ukraine		Lost to Russia during the annexation of Crimea
Auxiliary vessels
Command and SAR/medevac (1)
Type N		Command ship (Note: Designed as a tug)	BG-80 Danube	300	(Nazi Germany) Linz	1942	Put out of service in 2011; planned transfer to Izmail Naval Lyceum fell through Reportedly scrapped between October and 9 November, 2022
Motor yachts (2)
Adamant 315		Motor yacht	BG-732		Ukraine	2017	Captured by Russia after the Battle of Berdiansk
Galia-280		Small patrol boat	1 vessel		(Poland) Galeon Yachts, Straszyn		Lost to Russia during the annexation of Crimea
Special purpose boats and barges (6)
Baba Hasan		Border support ship	BG-59 Onyx		Turkey		Converted from fishing vessel in 2000; Vessel most likely captured or destroyed between the beginning of the full-scale Russian invasion of Ukraine and 20 May 2022 (inclusive); as of 2020, it was reported to be deployed in Mariupol, east of the Kerch Strait - prior to this
GTI SE 155 Sea-Doo		Jet skis	2 vessels		Mexico		Lost to Russia during the annexation of Crimea
Nalim (project 50150)		Border support ship (barge)	Nalim (project 50150)		(Ukraine) Zalyv Shipbuilding yard	Not yet in service when captured	Lost to Russia during the annexation of Crimea
(No formal type or project number)		Marine security barge (Note: Designed as a base tanker barge)	BNS-11250		Nazi Germany	1945 (Note: Built in 1943; possibly in commission before 1945 with Nazi Germany)	Decommissioned in 2012
(project 1842)		Floating base	RSZ-2 (Note: Previously named RSO-2)			1971	Sunk in Odesa no later than 2015; raised in 2016 to relieve space in the port

== Future ==
From 2012 to 2014 there were plans to build 39 small guard ships of different classes, including 6 Koral-class and 8 Orlan-class vessels.

From 2015 onward, there are plans to build a multipurpose guard ship, with displacement around 1000 tons, which can carry one helicopter.
