= Izmail Sea Guard Detachment =

18th Izmail Sea Guard Detachment
- 18-й Ізмаїл загін морської охорони (Ukrainian)
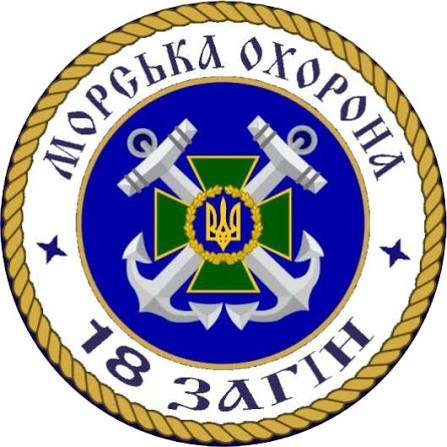
- Detachment Insignia
- Founded: 1996
- Country: Ukraine
- Allegiance: Ministry of Internal Affairs
- Branch: Sea Guard of Ukraine
- Type: Battalion
- Role: Coast Guard
- Part of: State Border Guard Service of Ukraine
- Garrison/HQ: Kiliya
- Engagements: Russo-Ukrainian war: War in Donbass; Russian invasion of Ukraine; Snake Island campaign; Southern Ukraine campaign
- Decorations: For Courage and Bravery

Commanders
- Current commander: Captain 1st Rank Shiksha Oleg Mykolayovych

The 18th Marine Guard Detachment (MUN 1560) is a military unit of the Ukrainian Sea Guard of the State Border Service of Ukraine. The detachment guards and patrols the maritime border of 172 km along the Danube in Odesa Oblast.

== History ==
In February 1996, on the basis of the 3rd River Brigade of Ukrainian Navy, the Izmail Sea Guard brigade was formed, consisting of four vessels of the project "21204" and one PSKR of the project "Trofeiny" along with a division of small boats and auxiliary vessels in Kiliya with Captain 1st Rank Martiyan M. P. as the brigade's first commander. On 6 July 1996, the vessel Lubny became the brigade's first vessel to be operationally deployed. The brigade performed regular patrols along Ukraine's maritime border on the Danube Delta at the junction of the Ukraine, Moldova, and Romania to the river's mouth. In 1999, the Izmail Brigade was recognized as the best naval unit of the Ukrainian Sea Guard and was awarded the Transitional Flag of the Odessa Regional Administration. On 26 December 1996, the vessel "Aist" of the Kiliya Division suffered an accident killing one sea guardsman (Kushnaryov M. A.). On 24 March 1999, the Izmail brigade's anti-submarine warfare ship took part in the destruction of WW2-era naval mines. In June 2000, the brigade underwent organizational and personnel changes and a training center was incorporated into its composition. In December 2000, it was disbanded and incorporated into the Odessa Sea Guard Detachment. In June 2002, it was reestablished as the 18th Izmail Maritime Guard Detachment. It was again disbanded in 2008. In July 2018, a decision was made to restore the unit. On February 20, 2019, the Cabinet of Ministers adopted a decree resulting in the reestablishment.

Following the Russian invasion of Ukraine, the detachment took part in the Snake Island campaign playing a direct role in the capture of snake island from Russian forces. BG-80 Danube was reportedly scrapped between October and 9 November 2022 amidst the war for spare parts. On 23 August 2023, the detachment destroyed a Russian Shahed drone. On 7 September 2023, the detachment's personnel destroyed a Russian kamikaze drone.

== Vessels ==
Vessel number	Image	Name	Class	Launched	Incorporation	Remarks
Auxiliary vessels
BG-58		Amethyst	Project "Steel" Turkish schooner		2000	
BG-80		Danube	Command ship	02.07.1942	01.08.1996	Until 1997 - SSV-10 Prut, Austrian-built minesweeper Grafinau.
Patrol vessels
BG-82		Lubny	Project 1204 artillery boats	1972	1994	
BG-81		Kaniv	Project 1204 artillery boats	1971	1995	
BG-83		Nizhyn	Project 1204 artillery boats	1968	1994	
BG-84		Izmail	Project 1204 artillery boats	1969	1995	
BG-107			Zhuk-class patrol boat			
BG-612			Project 376 patrol vessel			
BG-613			Project 376 patrol vessel			
BG-801		РВК-155	Project 376A vessel	20.12.1966	1997	
BG-806			Project 363 vessel			
BG-08			Kalkan-P			
BG-807			Kalkan			
BG-808			Kalkan			
			UMS 600			
			Galeon Galia 640			

== Commanders ==
- Captain 1st Rank Martiyan M. P. (1996–2000)
- Captain 1st Rank Isakov V.V. (2000–2002)
- Captain 1st Rank Zapyantsev Volodymyr Oleksandrovych (2002–2004)
- Captain 1st Rank Serhiy Volodymyrovych Shevchuk (2005–2007)
- Captain 1st Rank Oleksandr Oleksandrovich Tarasenko (2007–2008)
- Captain 1st Rank Shiksha Oleg Mykolayovych (2018–)
