= Straszyn Prędzieszyn railway station =

Railway station in Pomeranian Voivodeship, Poland

Coordinates: 54.2697°N 18.5719°E

Straszyn Prędzieszyn
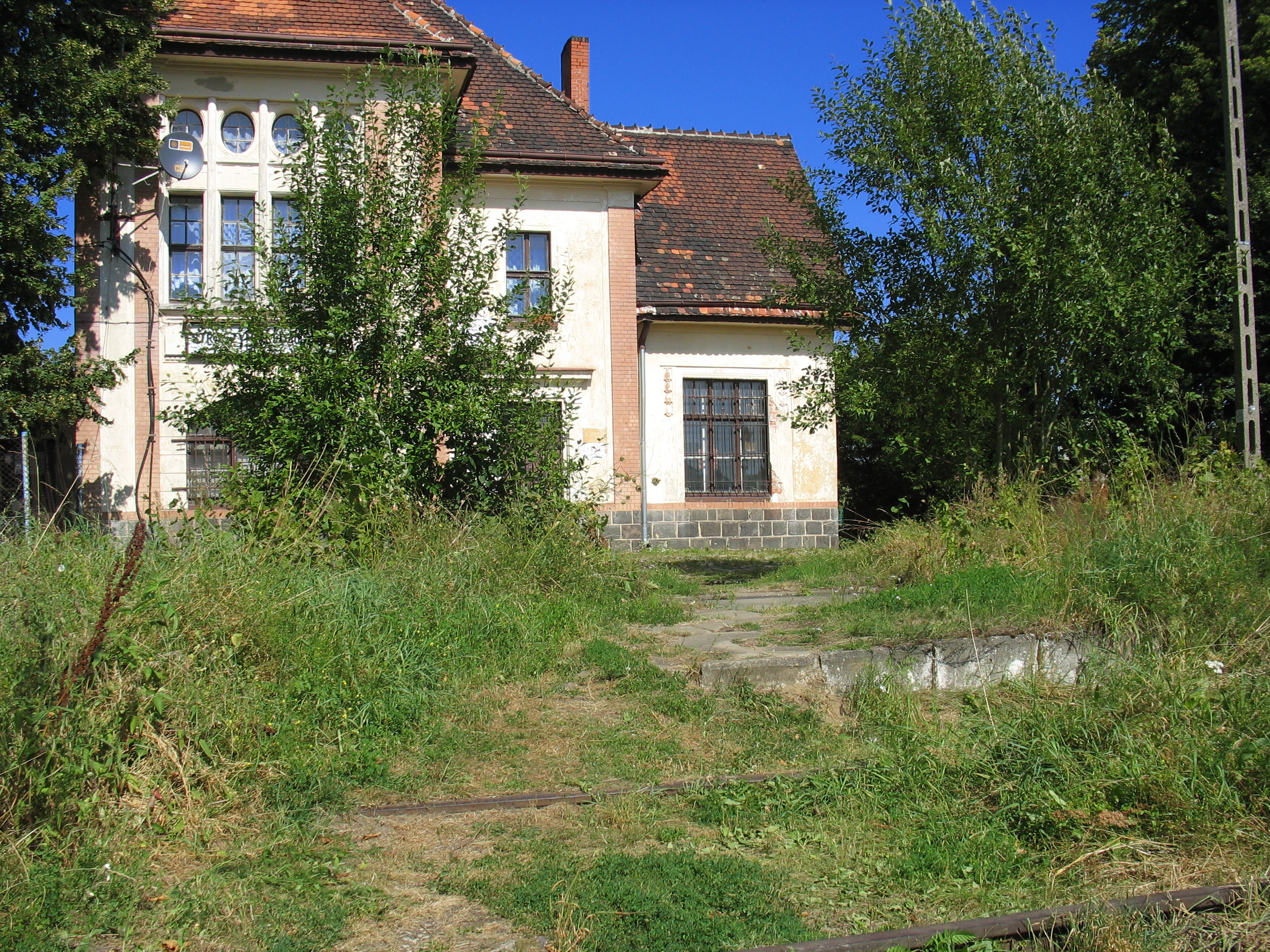

General information
- Location: Straszyn; Poland
- Owner: Polskie Koleje Państwowe S.A.
- Platforms: None

Construction
- Structure type: Building: Yes (no longer used); Depot: Never existed Water tower: Never existed

History
- Former names: Straschin Prangschin until 1945
Location

Straszyn Prędzieszyn is a non-operational railway station in Straszyn, Pomeranian Voivodeship, Poland.

== Lines crossing the station ==
Start station	End station	Line type
Pruszcz Gdański	Łeba	Closed
