= Mariupol Sea Guard Detachment =

23rd Mariupol Sea Guard Detachment
- 23-й Маріуполь загін морської охорони (Ukrainian)
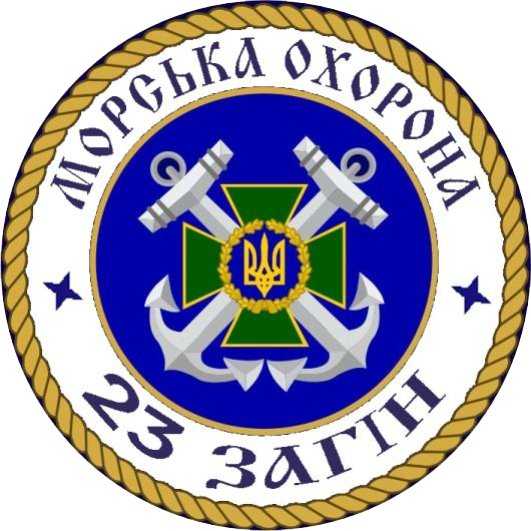
- Detachment Insignia
- Founded: 1994
- Country: Ukraine
- Allegiance: Ministry of Internal Affairs
- Branch: Sea Guard of Ukraine
- Type: Battalion
- Role: Coast Guard
- Part of: State Border Guard Service of Ukraine
- Garrison/HQ: Bilhorod-Dnistrovskyi
- Engagements: Russo-Ukrainian war: Russian invasion of Crimea; War in Donbass; Russian invasion of Ukraine; Southern Ukraine campaign; Siege of Mariupol; Battle of Berdiansk

Commanders
- Current commander: Captain 1st Rank Paslavsky Mykhailo Mykolayovych

The 23rd Marine Guard Detachment (MUN 1472) is a military unit of the Ukrainian Sea Guard of the State Border Service of Ukraine. The detachment guarded and patrolled the maritime border in the Sea of Azov, in a section of 154.7 nautical miles (249.5 km) and the Kerch Strait, in a section of 30.4 miles (49 km), within Donetsk, Zaporizhia and Kherson oblasts. But following the fall of Mariupol, it was relocated to Bilhorod-Dnistrovskyi.

== History ==
On 31 July 1994, the 23rd Separate Brigade of Border Guard Ships was established in Kerch from the vessels of Odessa and Balaklava maritime brigades. In the early 2000s, it was renamed we the 23rd Kerch Maritime Guard Detachment. In 2011, the detachment was reinforced with the special purpose maritime security ship "Onyx", formerly the Turkish schooner "Baba Hassan", captured by the Odessa Maritime Security Detachment in 2010 for illegal fishing in Ukrainian waters, it was then repaired and transferred to the Kerch Detachment.

On 28 February 2014, at night, a large part of the Kerch detachment by the order of the leadership of the Azov-Black Sea Regional Directorate, was evacuated from Kerch to Berdiansk leaving the maritime border unguarded except for the Kerch ferry crossing, where personnel remained on duty. On 3 March 2014, after midnight, 4 buses full of armed personnel, arrived at the detachment's headquarters in Genmola, besieged it and captured it without resistance, following negotiations. On 18 March 2014, 11 vessels of the Kerch detachment were relocated to Berdyansk and then on the night of 13–14 April to Mariupol where 7 vessels of another division were already based. On 31 August 2014, at 15:10, separatists attacked two patrol boats of the detachment, a BG-119 project 1400M “Grif” boat and a “Kalkan” vessel in the Sea of Azov with shelling and direct gunfire lighting up and sinking the “Grif” as well as damaging the “Kalkan”, prompting it to leave. Soon more vessels were deployed to rescue the sunken vessel's crew, 8 sailors were rescued of which 7 were wounded. The reinforcements were targeted with missiles but avoided hits. On 5 October 2014, at about 14:00, near Mariupol, during an attempted inspectiom of the attack site for the search of two missing sailors, a tactical vessel group of the detachment was attacked from Shyrokyne taking direct hits. The two sailors (Petukhov Denis Anatoliyovych and Tishchenko Bohdan Volodymyrovych) were later found dead and their bodies were recovered. On 7 June 2015, in the afternoon, 2 miles from Mariupol, a UMS-1000 vessel of the detachment encountered a naval mine, mistaking it for a radio buoy and tried to pull it to the ship, causing an explosion wounding six and killing two personnel (Vitaliy Anatolyevich Tatar and Masliy Anton Oleksandrovych), the latter being the vessel commander. On October 9, 2015, the State Azov Sea Marine Environmental Inspectorate handed over another "Kalkan" vessel to the detachment. On 29 July 2016, the Mariupol Sea Guard Detachment celebrated its 22nd anniversary. On 15 November 2016, a new UMS-1000 was transferred to the Mariupol Sea Guard Detachment. The UMS-1000 boat, damaged on 7 June 2015, was raised, repaired and returned to service on 26 May 2017.

Since the start of the Russian invasion of Ukraine, the detachment saw active combat against Russian forces particularly in the Siege of Mariupol and the defense of Azovstal, even acting as infantry due to limited naval combat capabilities. On 11 March 2022, a guardsman of the detachment (Yuryev Dmytro) was killed during a Combat mission in Mariupol. BG-59 Baba Hassan was also captured or destroyed before 20 May 2022, being previously deployed in Mariupol, east of the Kerch Strait - prior to this On 7 April 2022, two guardsmen of the detachment, (Pichakhchi Mykola Arturovich and Pakholivetsky Vladislav Genrikhovych) who were tasked with the regular delivery of resources to Azovstal to the by sea, were killed when their vessel was hit by a Russian missile system, while transporting the wounded soldiers of the Azov Brigade. On 15 April 2022, the ship BG-32 Donbass of the detachment was sunk by Russian forces and two more personnel of the detachment (Levchuk Igor Yuriyovych and Malina Roman) were killed in combat. The detachment was also involved in air evacuations of wounded personnel. BG-24 was captured by Russia after the Battle of Berdiansk Arabat and 1 unidentified Zhuk 1400M of the detachment were captured after the Battle of Berdiansk. BG-308, BG-310 and BG-311 captured by Russia after the Battle of Berdiansk BG-108 KaMO-517 and 1 unidentified Zhuk 1400M destroyed and wrecks captured by Russia during the Siege of Mariupol. BG-304, BG-22 and BG-23 both damaged and captured by Russia during the Siege of Mariupol BG-309 and 1 unidentified Kalkan captured by Russia during the Siege of Mariupol Following the culmination of the Siege of Mariupol, the detachment was evacuated and relocated to Bilhorod-Dnistrovskyi. On 27 July 2022, the detachment was awarded the honorary award "For Courage and Bravery". On 9 February 2024, 15 personnel of the detachment, captured during the Siege of Mariupol were released from Russian captivity.

== Vessels ==
| Vessel number | Image | Назва | Class | Launch | Induction | Remarks |
|---|---|---|---|---|---|---|
Heavy vessel
| BG-32 | | Donbas | Tarantul-class corvette | 1982 | 1992 | Sunk |
Auxiliary vessels
| ВG-59 | 150x150пкс | Onyx | Turkish schooner "Baba Hassan" | | 26.09.2011 | Captured or Destroyed |
Patrol vessels
| BG-105 | | | Zhuk-class patrol boat | | | |
| BG-108 | | 517 | Zhuk-class patrol boat | | | Destroyed and captured |
| BG-110 | | Lubomyr | Zhuk-class patrol boat | | | |
| BG-114 | | | Zhuk-class patrol boat | 1993 | | |
| BG-118 | | Arabat | Zhuk-class patrol boat | | | Destroyed and captured |
| BG-303 | | | Kalkan | | | |
| BG-304 | | | Kalkan | | | Destroyed and Captured |
| BG-305 | | | Kalkan | | | |
| BG-308 | | | Kalkan | | | Captured |
| BG-309 | | | Kalkan | | | Captured |
| BG-310 | | | Kalkan | | | Captured |
| BG-311 | | | Kalkan | | 09.10.2015 | |
| BG-22 | | | UMS 1000 | 2014 | 31.07.2014 | Damaged and Captured |
| BG-24 | | | UMS 1000 | 2016 | 15.11.2016 | Captured |
| BG-25 | | | UMS 1000 | 16.11.2018 | 22.12.2018 | |
| | | | UMS 600 | | | |
| | | | Galeon Galia 640 | | | |
| | | | BRIG Navigator N730M | | | |

== Commanders ==
- Captain 1st Rank Yuriy Loshak (2008–2014)
- Captain 1st Rank Mykola Volodymyrovych Syrinsky (2015–2019)
- Captain 1st Rank Levytskyi Mykola Serhiyovych (2019–2022)
- Captain 1st Rank Paslavsky Mykhailo Mykolayovych (2022-)
