= Mukha-class corvette =

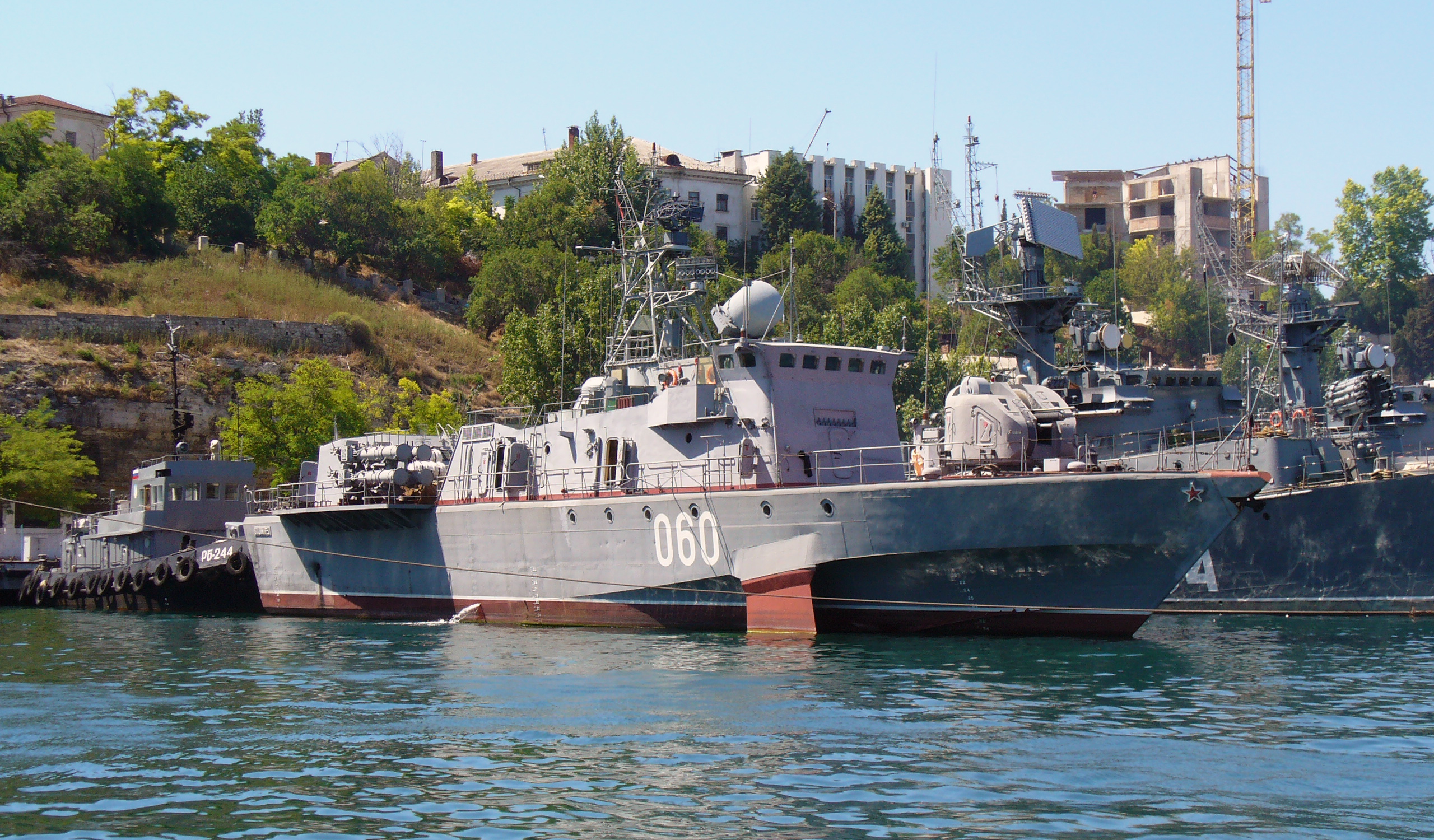
- Vladimirets in 2008

Class overview
- Name: Mukha class (Project 11451 Sokol)
- Operators: Soviet Navy; Russian Navy
- In service: 1987- 2014
- Completed: 2
- Canceled: 2
- Retired: 2

General characteristics
- Type: Hydrofoil corvette
- Displacement: 364 tons standard; 470 tons full load
- Length: 49.97 m (163 ft 11 in)
- Beam: 9.89 m (32 ft 5 in)
- Draught: 2.16 m (7 ft 1 in)
- Propulsion: 2x20.000 hp M10D gas turbines, 1x8.500 hp M16 gas turbine, 3x2 fixed pitch propellers, 2 rudder propellers, 1 bow thruster, 2x200 kW DGR-2A-200/1500 diesel generators M504
- Speed: 60.5 knots (112.0 km/h; 69.6 mph)
- Range: 750 nautical miles (1,390 km; 860 mi) at 12 knots (22 km/h; 14 mph); 1.450 nautical miles (2.685 km; 1.669 mi) at 50 knots (93 km/h; 58 mph)
- Endurance: 7 days
- Complement: 39
- Sensors & processing systems: MR-220 Reyd surface search radar; ARP-58SV radar radio direction finder; MG-369 Zvezda-M1-01 sonar; MGS-407К sonar; Beysur-451 navigational complex; Tayfun-4 communication complex; PK-16 decoy RL (2 KL-101 launchers)
- Armament: 1 × AK-176 naval gun; 1 × AK-630 gun; 2 × 4 400 mm TR-224 torpedo tubes (8 torpedoes SET-72); 1 × 8 9K34 Strela-3 SAM system launcher

The Mukha class, Soviet designation Project 11451 Sokol (falcon), was a class of hydrofoil patrol corvettes built for the Soviet Navy. Designated with the NATO reporting name Mukha class, it consisted of anti-submarine hydrofoils, used primarily for experimental purposes. The ships were built by PO More Shipyard in Feodosya, which had a broad experience in hydrofoil shipbuilding.

== Design ==
From a technical point of view, it is a modified version of the previous Babochka class (Project 1141), with which it shares the same hull and propulsion system. In particular, propulsion with the hull out of the water (foilborne) is ensured by two M-10 (NK-12M) gas turbines of 36,000 shp + 2 M-16 GTU, which allow a maximum speed of 50 knots, while propulsion with the hull in the water (hullborne) is ensured by two M-401 diesel engines of 2,200 shp (12.2 knots maximum speed). At the time of construction, no missile armament was carried, even if these units later received systems of various types. In detail, both SA-N-8 anti-aircraft missiles and SS-N-29 anti-ship missile mounted.

== Service ==
The two vessels entered service in the second half of the 1980s with the Black Sea Fleet. Future production was canceled, and the ships were used for experimental purposes. In particular, one vessel was used for testing the SS-N-29 anti-ship missile, which lasted from 1993 to 1997.

Only one unit, designated MPK-220 Vladimirets, was still in service with the Russian Navy as of October 2001, decommissioned in 2014.

== Ships ==
A total of 4 boats were planned for the Soviet Navy, but only two were completed.

Name	Hull No.	Commissioned	Service	Decommissioned	Status
MPK-215	501	31 December 1987	BSe	2001	Scrapped
MPK-220	502	30 December 1990	BSe	2014	since 03.04.1998 - Vladimirets Scrapped
MPK-231	503	-	-		Cancelled
MPK-?»	504	-	-		Cancelled
