= More (Feodosiya) =

Shipyard in Feodosia, Crimea

Shipbuilding Plant More
- Native name: СЗ «Море»
- Type: Federal State Unitary Enterprise
- Industry: shipbuilding, arms industry
- Founded: 1938
- Headquarters: Feodosia, Russia / Ukraine
- Revenue: $262,530 (2015)
- Operating income: −$1.27 million (2015)
- Net income: −$1.6 million (2015)
- Total assets: $17.6 million (2015)
- Total equity: $14.8 million (2015)
- Owner: Ministry of Industry and Trade (Russia)
- Website: More Ship

PO More Shipyard (Ukrainian: Відкрите акціонерне товариство Феодосійська суднобудівна компанія «Море», Russian: Судостроительный Завод «Море», originally Yuzhnaya Toka, Southern Stream) is a shipyard in Prymorskyi, Feodosia Municipality, Crimea.

Its most prominent products are the Zubr-class LCAC ship, military corvettes patrol boats and hydrofoil, and civilian Raketa, Meteorit, Kometa, Zarya and Voskhod fast hydrofoil boats.

== History ==
The construction of the shipyard began in 1938. It started specializing in the construction of fast vessels in 1947, after World War II. It also began to produce with hydrofoil in the years afterward, and in 1970 it began to produce hovercraft. Following the collapse of the Soviet Union, the shipyard came under the control of Ukraine.

In 2002, it concluded a contract to supply the Kalkan-class patrol boats to Turkmenistan, worth around 17 million hryvnias. However, by 2010, it recorded a net loss of 22.35 million hryvnias. In 2011, this shifted around when it returned to profitability with a net profit of 11.47 million hryvnias, which was in large part due to a contract with the Chinese military. The Chinese Navy had issued a contract with the shipyard to produce two Zubr-class LCAC ships, with two more ships being built in China afterwards, but with the participation of Ukrainian specialists from the shipyard. The total value of the contract was $350 million. The first vessel was delivered prior to 2013, and the second was being prepared for delivery in late 2013.

Following the 2014 Russian annexation of Crimea the company was taken over by the Russian federal government with the legal form of a Federal State Unitary Enterprise. On 23 October 2014, the shipyard was officially re-registered under Russian law. At the time, the then Russian-appointed Minister of Industrial Policy for Crimea, Andriy Skrynnyk, stated the enterprise would preserve everything prior to the annexation. As of 2016 the shipyard is building a Karakurt-class corvette for Russia's Black Sea Fleet, with funds from the Russian National Commercial Bank. However, the number of workers at the shipyard significantly fell from 1,000 to 350 by mid-2022, and in July 2022 44 more workers were dismissed. In March 2022, following the outbreak of the Russian invasion of Ukraine, its shares were transferred from Rostec to the United Shipbuilding Corporation (USC). At the time, the Head of the Russian Interregional Trade Union of Shipbuilding and Ship Repair Workers wrote to Mikhail Mishustin warning about the impending bankruptcy of the shipyard, due to an absence of orders from international buyers due to fear of sanctions, growing debt to suppliers, and deteriorating finances.

== List of products ==
- Muravey-class patrol boat Project 133 Antares, hydrofoil patrol boat
- Zubr-class, Air-cushioned landing crafts
- Project 22800 (Karakurt) - Storm, Okhotsk, and Tsiklon corvettes
- Project 1124 Albatros (Grisha)
- Project 11451 Sokol (Mukha), hydrofoil patrol boat
- Project 1240 Uragan (Sarancha), hydrofoil patrol boat
- Project 1241 Molnya (Tarantul), Project 12412
- Project 1400 Grif (Zhuk), Project 1400M, Project 14670, Project 1450

=== Building ===
Name	Class and type	Plant №	Laid down	Launched
(Zubr)	Zubr-class LCAC ship (at least 1 or 2, maybe 3 almost finished, < April 2014)	xxxN°	(either < 1989 within < 1998)	
Lviv	Small ASW corvette, Project 11451 Sokol	504 (U201)	1989	unfinished
Luhansk	Small ASW corvette, Project 11451 Sokol	503 (U203)	1989	unfinished
	Project 1400 Grif (Zhuk), Project 1400M, Pr. 14670, Pr. 1450 (x N°)			
Shtorm	Project 22800 Missile Corvette (and Patrol to ASW)	254	11 May 2016	
Ohotsk	Project 22800 Missile Corvette (and Patrol to ASW)	255	17 March 2017	
nd	various Passenger Hydrofoil (most of) ships (2 to 5 types of class)	nd	(after April–May 2014)	
nd	nd	nd	nd	

== International sanctions ==
In September 2016, the plant was sanctioned by the United States for its involvement in Crimea as a military-industrial company. Following the Russian invasion of Ukraine, the plant was subjected to further international sanctions. In April 2022, the European Union sanctioned the plant, with the official statement by the EU being that the shipyard had provided military warships to the Russian Navy, and also for its use of the "Z" symbol as its logo, which is associated with support for the Russian invasion. It is also included in sanctions outside of the EU by Japan, Ukraine, Monaco, the United States, and Switzerland.
