= Odesa Sea Guard Detachment =

1st Odesa Sea Guard Detachment
- 1-й Одеський загін морської охорони (Ukrainian)
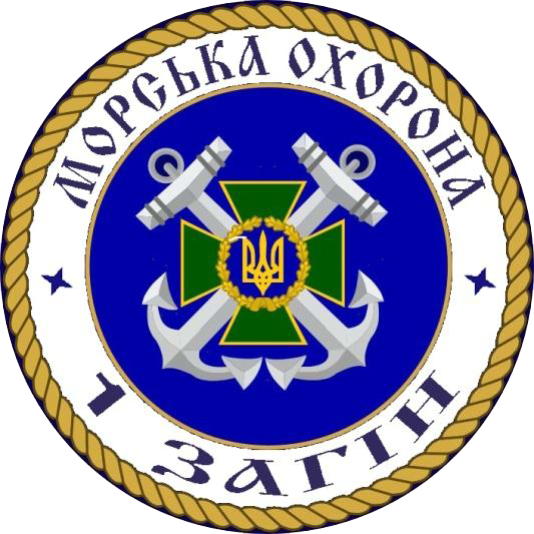
- Detachment Insignia
- Founded: 1992
- Country: Ukraine
- Allegiance: Ministry of Internal Affairs
- Branch: Sea Guard of Ukraine
- Type: Battalion
- Role: Coast Guard
- Part of: State Border Guard Service of Ukraine
- Garrison/HQ: Odesa
- Engagements: Russo-Ukrainian war: Russian invasion of Crimea; War in Donbass; Battle of the border; Russian invasion of Ukraine; Southern Ukraine campaign
- Decorations: For Courage and Bravery

Commanders
- Current commander: Captain 1st rank Magera Roman Yaroslavovych

1st Marine Guard Detachment (MUN 1485) is a military unit of the Ukrainian Sea Guard of the State Border Service of Ukraine. The detachment guards and patrols the maritime border in the Black Sea of 237 nautical miles (381.41 km) and also patrols and guards 97.78 miles (156.11 km) of maritime border along the Danube, in total an area of 25,000 sq. miles (82,500 km^{2}). Its range borders the areas of operations of Izmail, Bilhorod-Dniester and Odesa border detachments.

== History ==
In 1992, the 18th Odesa Sea Guard Detachment's personnel swore allegiance to Ukraine. In March 1995, the 26th and the 18th Marine Border Guard Detachment were merged as the 26th Sea Guard Detachment. In 2000 it was expanded to a Brigade level detachment named as the "1st Odesa Sea Guard Detachment". On 1 November 2002, it was awarded "The Best Military Unit of the Southern Direction of the Armed Forces of Ukraine." On 1 November 2009, it was again awarded as the "Best Military Unit of the Southern Regional Directorate of the State Border Service of Ukraine" and then for the third time in 2010.

In 2014, following the Russian invasion of Crimea, 12 units of the Sevastopol and Yalta maritime guard detachments were added to the Odesa Sea Guard detachment. On 7 August 2014, a sea guardsman of the detachment (Kolisnychenko Yevhen Anatoliyovych) was killed in combat during the Battle of the border. In 2018, Iryna Herashchenko and Iryna Friz presented the detachment with parliamentary honours. On 12 May 2021, the detachment discovered and thwarted the Russian missile corvette "Pavel Derzhavin" in the Black Sea near the city of Chornomorsk. On 1 June 2021, the detachment's chief of staff, Oleksiy Chertkov, did not arrive at the detachment's location and had gone missing, a search was initiated but failed to bring results, he was later revealed to be a Russian agent that had been evacuated by Russian agencies.

On 5 March 2022, the detachment evacuated 40 foreign crew members amidst the Russian invasion of Ukraine. In December 2022, the special operations force of the detachment underwent extensive training. On 7 April 2023, the positions of the detachment in Kherson Oblast were struck by Russian Air Force, with Russian government sources alleging to have inflicted "significant casualties" of around "50 personnel". In 2023, it also conducted regular patrols in the Black Sea aimed at deterring the Russian fleet as well as boarding suspicious vehicles in search of ammunition and equipment being transported. It again underwent extensive training in December 2023. On the new year eve of 2024, the detachment destroyed a Russian Shahed drone.

== Vessels ==
Vessel number	Image	Назва	Class	Launched	Commissioned	Note
Heavy Vessels
ВG-50		Grigory Kuropyatnikov	Tarantul-class corvette	18.01.1984	30.09.1984	
BG-57	150x150пкс	Mykolaiv	Stenka-class patrol boat	1988	1992	Simultaneous introduction
BG-62	150x150пкс	Podillia	Stenka-class patrol boat	1983	1995	Simultaneous introduction
BG-63	150x150пкс	Pavel Derzhavin	Stenka-class patrol boat	1987	1993	Simultaneous introduction
Auxiliary vessels
BG-60	150x150пкс	Titan	Tug	1974	2021	Command and Special Operations
Light vessels
BG-01		Crimea	Chika-class	1978	1992	
BG-101		525	1400М Patrol vessels			
BG-103		511	1400М Patrol vessels			
BG-104		512	1400М Patrol vessels			
BG-106		Zlotokraj	1400М Patrol vessels			
BG-109		Nemyriv	1400М Patrol vessels			
BG-111		Odesa	1400М Patrol vessels			
BG-115		Ternopil	1400М Patrol vessels			
BG-116		Darnytsia	1400М Patrol vessels			
BG-117		Vatutinets	1400М Patrol vessels			
BG-200		Balaclava	Orlan-class	09.10.2012	11.12.2012	
BG-07	150x150пкс		Kalkan-P			
BG-10	150x150пкс		Kalkan-P			
BG-12	150x150пкс		Kalkan-P			
BG-303			Kalkan			
BG-503			Kalkan			
BG-603			Kalkan			
BG-604			Kalkan			
BG-607			Kalkan			
BG-14			UMS 1000	2011	2011	
BG-15			UMS 1000	2011	2011	
BG-16			UMS 1000	2012	10.10.2012	
BG-17			UMS 1000	2012	10.10.2012	
BG-19			UMS 1000	2012	11.12.2012	
BG-20			UMS 1000	2013	2013	
BG-21			UMS 1000	2013	2013	
BG-23			UMS 1000	06.10.2014	2014	
			UMS 600			Small patrol vessels
	150x150пкс		Galeon Galia 640			
			BRIG Navigator N730M			Used for Special operations detachment

== Commanders ==
- Captain 1st rank Samarsky Dmitry Leonidovich (?-2016?)
- Captain 1st rank Magera Roman Yaroslavovych (2016-)

== Structure ==
The detachment consists of:

- Management and Headquarters
- Heavy Warship Division (Odesa)
- Kiliya Sea Guard vessels Division (Kiliya)
- Kyiv Maritime security Division (Kyiv)
- Skadovsk Sea Guard Division (Skadovsk)
- Special Operations Detachment
- Support Units
