= Zhuk-class patrol boat =

1969 Soviet patrol boat class

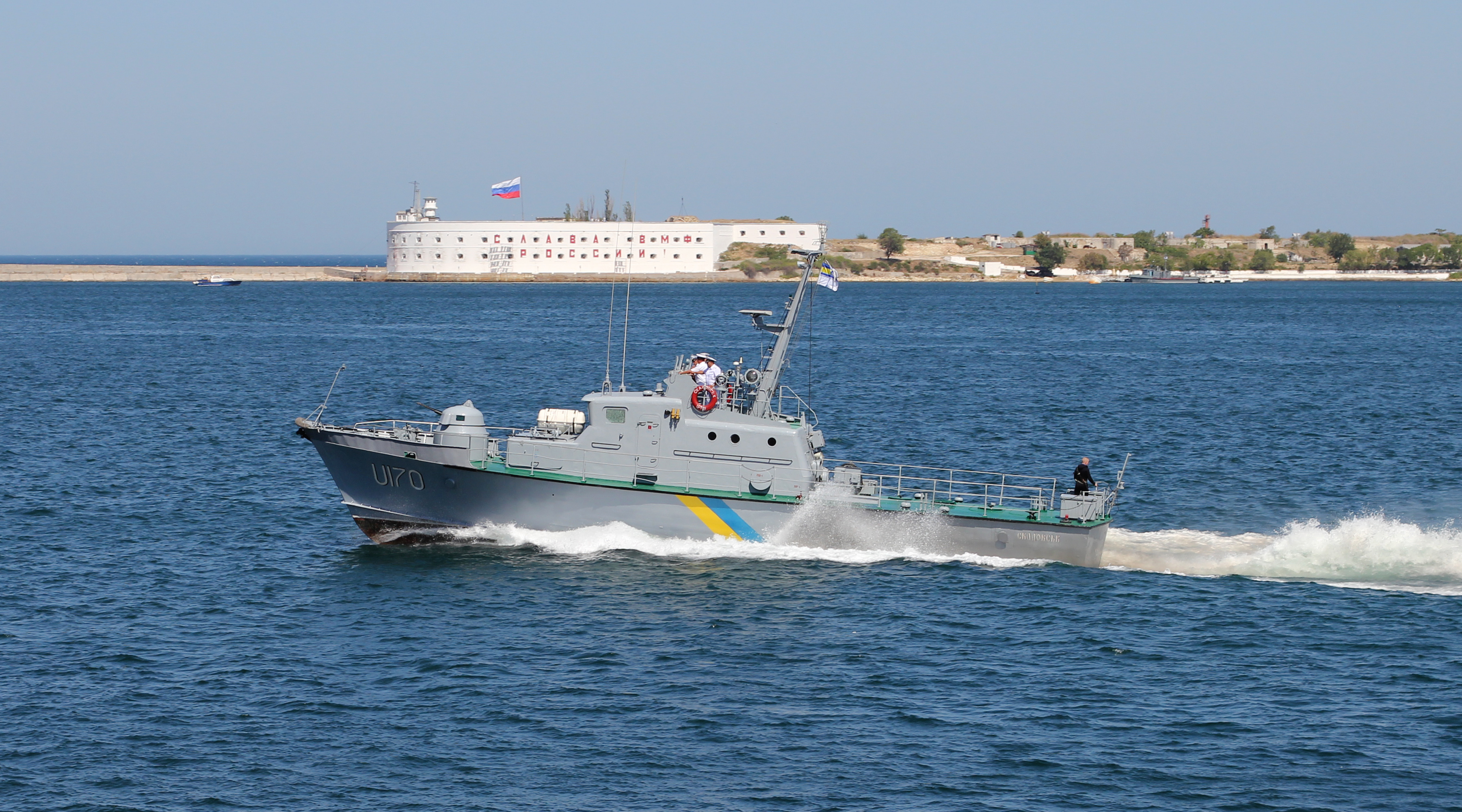
- Ukrainian patrol boat U170 Skadovsk at Sevastopol Bay, 2012

Class overview
- Name: Zhuk class (Project 1400 Grif)
- Builders: Almaz Shipbuilding Company, Leningrad; More Shipyard PO, Feodosiya; Batumi Shipbuilding Factory, Batumi
- Operators: see below

General characteristics
- Type: Patrol boat
- Displacement: 39 t (38 LT)
- Length: 23.8 m (78 ft)
- Beam: 5 m (16 ft)
- Draught: 1.1 m (4 ft)
- Installed power: Diesel-direct: 2 Type M401B diesels (2 x MTU/CAT; 2 x 1,000 @ 2,300 rpm)
- Propulsion: 2 shafts
- Speed: 30 m
- Range: 450 nmi (830 km)
- Complement: 11 (3 officers, 8 enlisted)
- Sensors & processing systems: Mius ("Spin Trough") surface search/navigation (range, bearing)
- Armament: 2 x twin 12.7 mm (0.50 in) guns

The Zhuk-class patrol boat (/ʒʊk/; Russian: Жук, lit. 'beetle'), Soviet designation Project 1400 "Grif" (Russian: Сторожевые катера проекта 1400 (1400М) «Гриф», romanized: Storozhevyye katera proyekta 1400 (1400M) "Grif", lit. 'Vulture'), is a class of small border patrol vessels built in the Soviet Union and its successor states. Over 300 boats were built between 1969 and 1991. The vessels were primarily used by the KGB Border Troop Maritime Units. The vessels had a cheap design suitable for mass production, with a single simple radar unit and manually-aimed machine guns.

The Zhuk-class was widely exported to over 20 countries. After the dissolution of the Soviet Union in 1991, it was distributed to its successor states, with the majority taken over by the Russian Federal Coast Guard. By 2007 only 15–20 remained in service with the Russian Navy.

== Variants ==
Project 1400
Project 1400A
Project 1400E
Created in 1972
Project 1400M
Project 1400ME
Created in 1976
Project 1400T
Export version for Turkmenistan, 1 built in 2004.

== Operators ==
Abkhazia

- Abkhazian Navy – 2 were received in 1992–1993 and their armament was replaced with 1×2-23 mm ZU-23-2 and 1–2 blocks of S-8 rocket (80 mm by 20 pieces per block); those two were involved in the Sukhumi Airport blockade and the 1993 Sukhumi airliner attacks during the war in Abkhazia, shooting down at least one Sukhoi Su-25, one Tupolev Tu-134, and two Tupolev Tu-154s). In 2004 received 3 vessels from the Russian 6th Patrol Boat Brigade and in 2006 received 3 more vessels. 2 have been decommissioned and scrapped.

Algeria

- Military of Algeria – 1 vessel procured in 1981.

Azerbaijan

- Azerbaijani Navy – 1 vessel inherited from the Caspian Flotilla.

Benin

- Navy of Benin – 4 vessels transferred. All decommissioned by 2002.

Cambodia

- Royal Cambodian Navy – 3 units transferred in 1975. In 1988 a fourth example was returned by Vietnam. Used for riverine patrol, they are active.

Cape Verde

- Coast Guard – 3 units transferred, all non-operational as of 2014.

Democratic Republic of the Congo

- DRC Navy – 3 units transferred by the USSR in 1982 and 3 more ordered in 1984.

Cuba

- Cuban Navy – 40 units transferred to Cuba between 1971 and 1989. By 2007 only a dozen remained in service.

Equatorial Guinea

- Military of Equatorial Guinea – 3 units transferred from 1971–1975. They were scrapped in 1988–89.

Estonia

- Estonian Navy – 2 vessels left behind after the Soviet withdrawal were commissioned in 1992. One was scrapped in 2001 and replaced by Swedish- and Finnish-built vessels. The other, EML Grif (P401), is preserved at the Lennusadam port of the Estonian Maritime Museum.

Ethiopia

- Ethiopian Navy – 4 were transferred in 2 batches between 1982 and 1990. They were destroyed by Eritrean rebels during the Ethiopian Civil War.

Guinea

- Military of Guinea – 2 refurbished units were transferred from the USSR to Guinea in 1987 and remain in service.

Iraq

- Iraqi Navy – 5 Zhuks were transferred by 1975. Relegated to security tasks during the Iran–Iraq War from 1980–1988, they took part in the 1990 attack on Kuwait City. During Operation Desert Storm three were sunk by Coalition aircraft, with the remaining two sunk in 2003 by US planes as part of Operation Iraqi Freedom.

Mauritius

- Military of Mauritius – 2 units were given to Mauritius in 1990, named Rescuer and Retriever. In 2007 were in excellent condition and operational. They have been upgraded with a new radar and civilian GPS receivers.

Mozambique

- Armed Forces for the Defense of Mozambique – 5 units delivered between 1978 and 1980. 2 were sunk during the Mozambican Civil War. The remainder were decommissioned in 1993.

Nicaragua

- Nicaraguan Navy – 8 units transferred by 1986. Two were lost during a 1989 hurricane and replaced with new units from the USSR. All but one were removed from service by 2000, with one, Río Segovia (GC301), remaining in service as of 2014.

Russia

- Russian Coast Guard – Up to 25 vessels (Pr.1400) were part of two border guard brigades (6th Patrol Boats Brigade in Ochamchire and 21st Patrol Boats Brigade in Novorossiysk); 4 vessels (Pr.1400ME) were part of a boat training group (GUK) that was based in Ochamchire, but training was conducted in Poti; 2 vessels (Pr.1400A) were part of government vessels division and based in Sochi (as of 2026, some may have decommissioned). One vessel, AK-388 (either in Coast Guard or Navy service), transferred from the Northern to the Black Sea Fleet in 2026.

Seychelles

- Seychelles People's Defence Force – Supplied by the USSR in 1982. 2 vessels remain operational with modernized radars.

Somalia

- Somali Navy – 1 unit was transferred, sunk in the civil war of 1991.

Soviet Union

- Soviet Coast Guard

Syria

- Syrian Navy – 8 units were transferred from 1981–1988. Home ported at Tartous. They remain in service.

Turkmenistan

- Turkmen Naval Forces – 5 vessels inherited in 1992. 1 Pr. 1400T exported in 2004.

Ukraine

- Ukrainian Navy – 2 vessels inherited; at least 10 more vessels built at the More Plant in Feodosiya.
- Ukrainian Sea Guard – 7 vessels of the 5th Patrol Boat Brigade in Balaklava (2 Pr.1400 and 3 Pr.1400M), 15 vessels of the 18th Patrol Boat Brigade in Odesa.

Vietnam

- Vietnam People's Navy – 14 units were transferred between 1978 and 1990. 1 was transferred to Cambodia, and 3 decommissioned in 1993. By 2007 all had been decommissioned.
- Vietnam Border Guard - 5 units.
- Vietnam Customs - 3 units, all decommissioned.

Yemen

- Yemeni Navy – Following the unification of North and South Yemen, 7 were in Yemeni possession. 4 were modified with the addition of Decca 1226 radar systems. Retired by 2006 and replaced by new patrol boats from Australia.
