= Straszyn, Pomeranian Voivodeship =

Straszyn
- Village
- Coat of arms

- Location within Poland
- Coordinates: 54°16′17″N 18°34′50″E
- Country: Poland
- Voivodeship: Pomeranian
- County: Gdańsk
- Gmina: Pruszcz Gdański
- Population: 3,600

Straszyn [ˈstraʂɨn] is a village in the administrative district of Gmina Pruszcz Gdański, within Gdańsk County, Pomeranian Voivodeship, in northern Poland.

For details of the history of the region, see History of Pomerania.

== Gallery ==
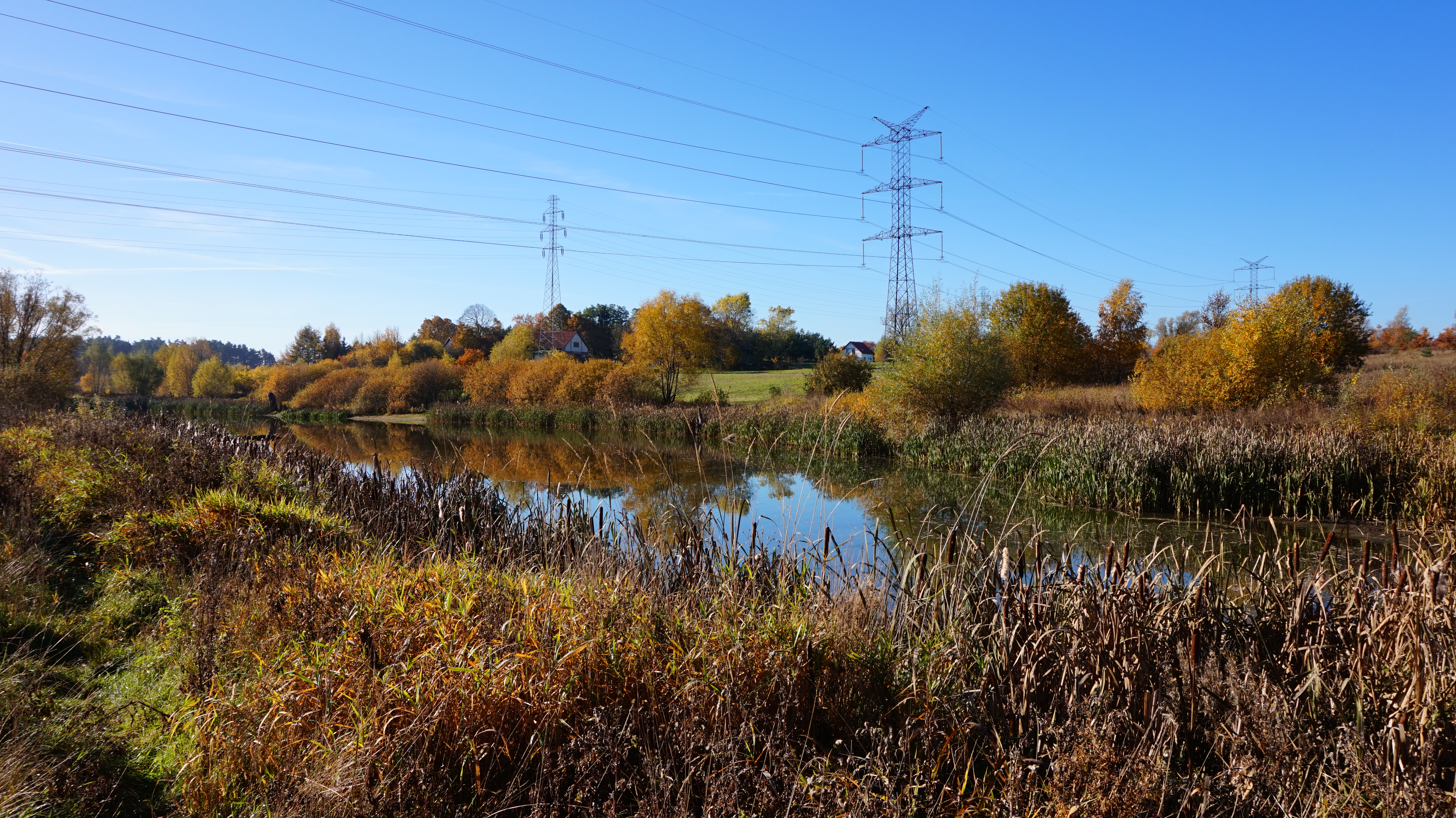

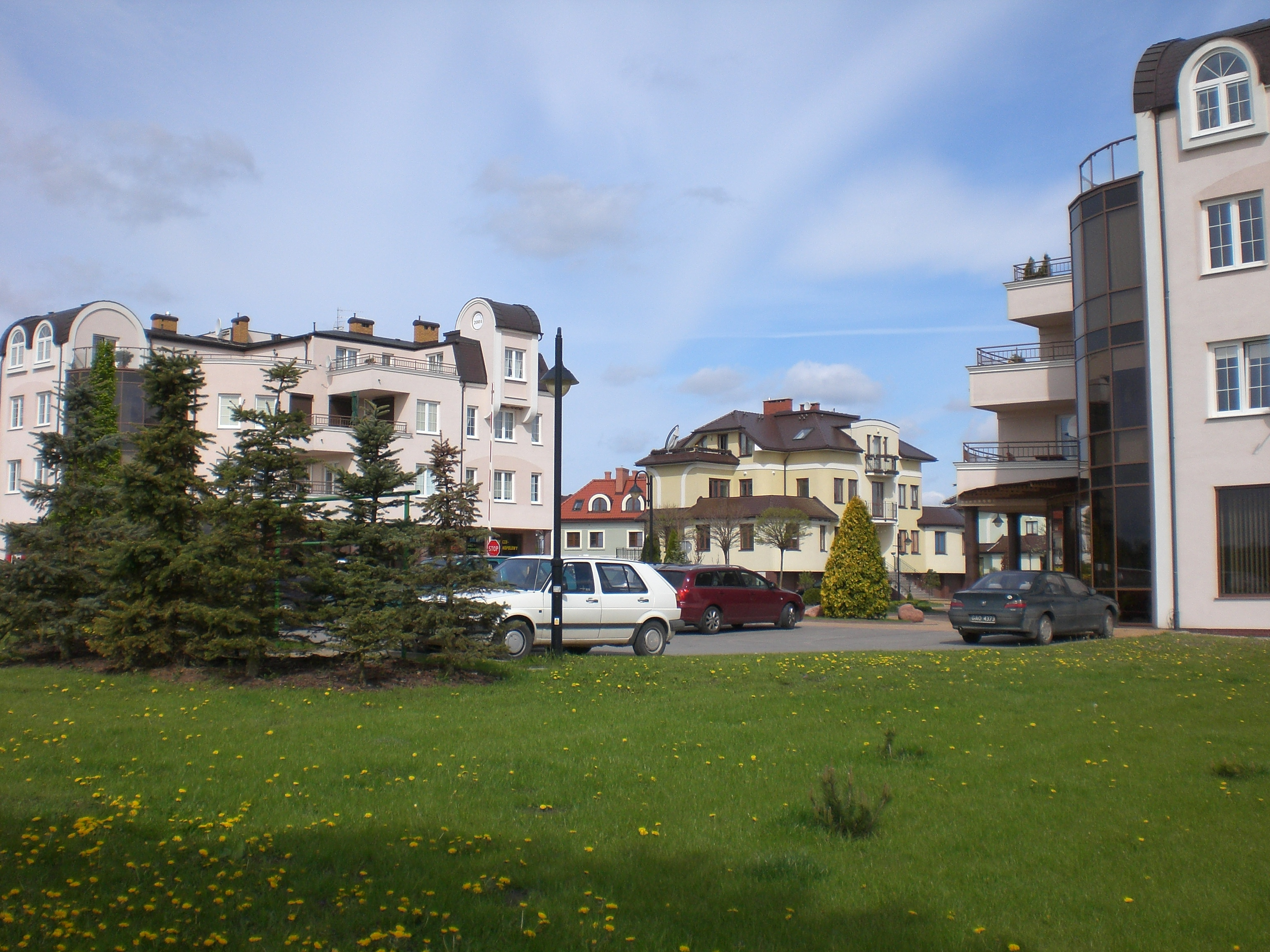

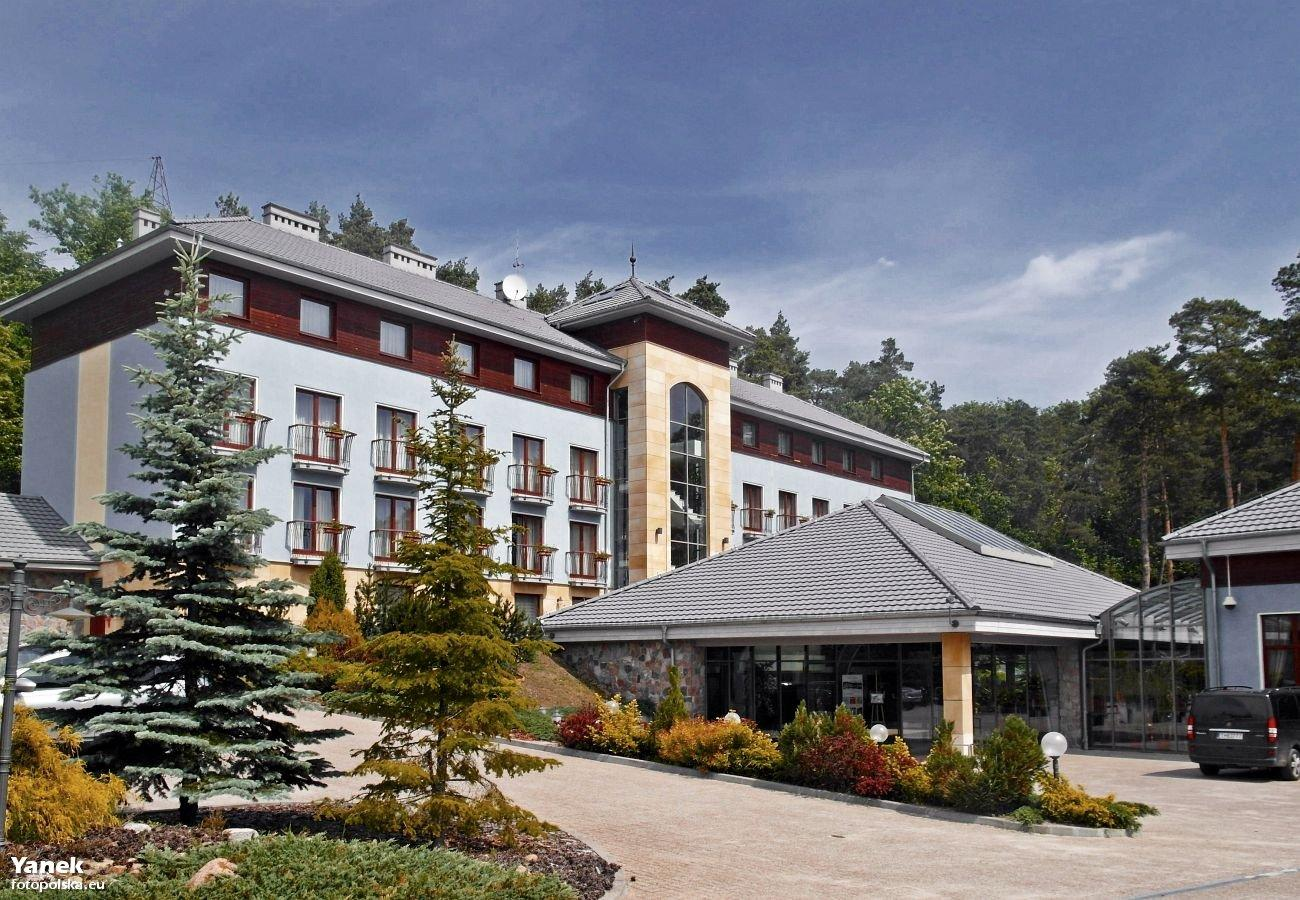

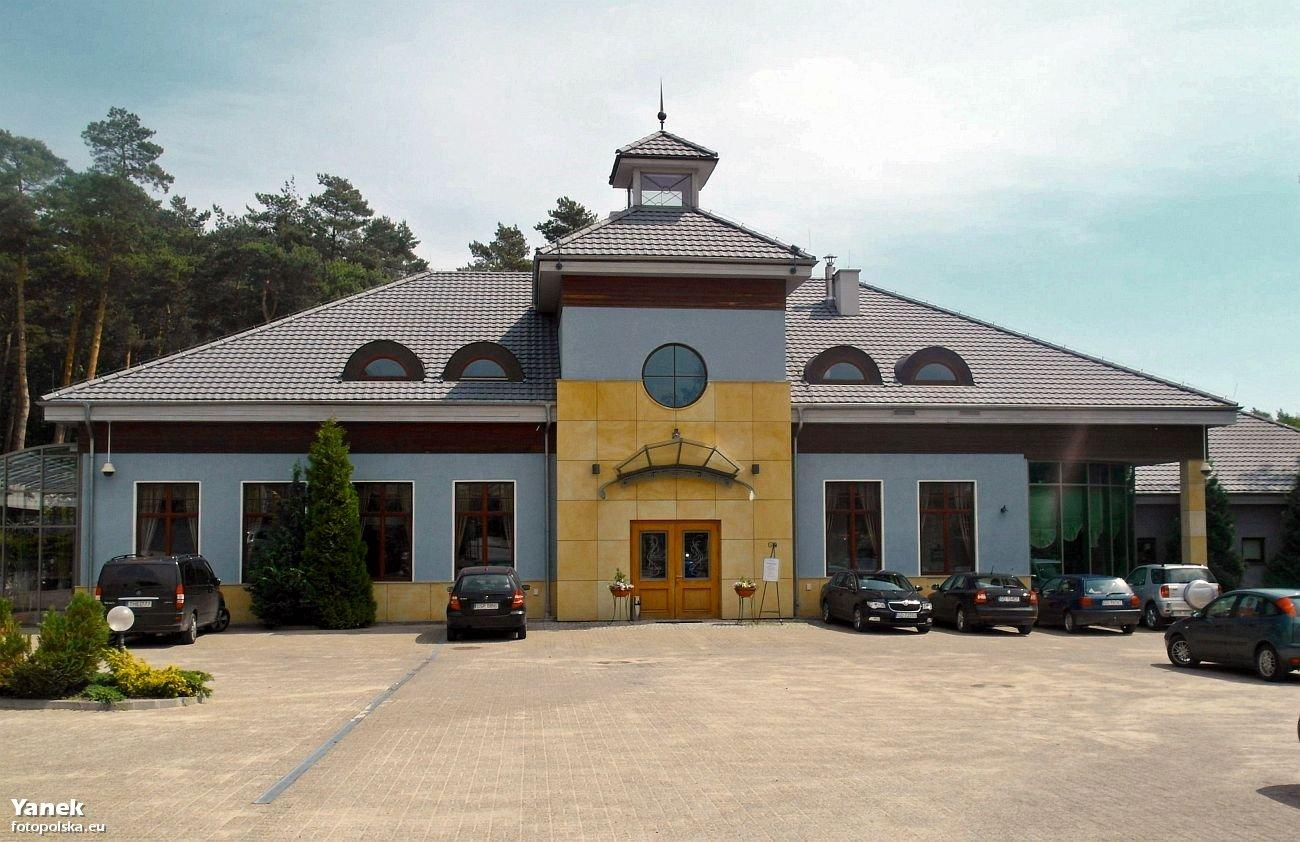
