= Minister of Finance of Saint Lucia =

Minister of Finance of Saint Lucia is a cabinet minister in charge of the Ministry of Finance, Economic Development and the Youth Economy of Saint Lucia, responsible for public finances of the country. The ministry is located at Financial Administrative Center, Pointe Seraphine, Castries. The first minister of finance who was not prime minister, was Stephenson King in June 2007.

== Ministers of Finance ==
Name	Took office	Left office	Party	Notes
John Compton	April 1964	July 1979	UWP	
Allan Louisy	July 1979	May 1981	SLP	
Winston Cenac	May 1981	January 1982	SLP	
Michael Pilgrim	January 1982	May 1982	PLP	
John Compton	May 1982	April 1996	UWP	
Vaughan Lewis	April 1996	May 1997	UWP	
Kenny Anthony	May 1997	December 2006	SLP	
John Compton	December 2006	June 2007	UWP	
Stephenson King	June 2007	November 2011	UWP	
Kenny Anthony	November 2011	June 2016	SLP	
Allen Chastanet	June 2016	July 2021	UWP	
Philip J. Pierre	July 2021	Incumbent	SLP	

== See also ==
- Government of Saint Lucia
- Economy of Saint Lucia
