= Deputy Prime Minister of Saint Lucia =

The Deputy Prime Minister of Saint Lucia is an additional portfolio usually given to a member of the Cabinet of Saint Lucia in order to deputize the Prime Minister. The prime minister might appoint a deputy prime minister in order to provide continuity.

== Deputy Premiers 1967-1979 ==
Name	Premier	Took office	Left office	Party	Notes
Hunter J. Francois	John Compton	1967	1972	UWP	Resigned

== Deputy Prime Ministers since 1979 ==
Name	Prime Minister	Took office	Left office	Party	Notes
George Mallet	John Compton	February 1979	July 1979	UWP	
George Odlum	Allan Louisy	July 1979	May 1981	SLP	
Peter Josie	Winston Cenac	May 1981	January 1982	SLP	
-	Michael Pilgrim	January 1982	May 1982		
George Mallet	John Compton	May 1982	April 1996	UWP	
Louis George	Vaughan Lewis	April 1996	May 1997	UWP	
Mario Michel	Kenny Anthony	May 1997	December 2006	SLP	
Lenard Montoute	John Compton	December 2006	September 2007	UWP	
Lenard Montoute	Stephenson King	September 2007	November 2011	UWP	
Philip J. Pierre	Kenny Anthony	December 2011	June 2016	SLP	
Vacant	Allen Chastanet	June 2016	July 2021		
Ernest Hilaire	Philip J. Pierre	7 January 2022	Incumbent	SLP	

== See also ==
- Prime Minister of Saint Lucia
- Politics of Saint Lucia
