= Leader of the Opposition (Saint Lucia) =

Person who leads the official parliamentary opposition in Saint Lucia

Leader of the Opposition is a constitutionally sanctioned office in Saint Lucia. The Constitution indicates that there shall be a Leader of the Opposition in the House of Assembly of Saint Lucia who is appointed by the Governor-General of Saint Lucia.

Usually the person is likely to command support of a majority of the members of the House who are not supporting the Government of Saint Lucia. Leader of the Opposition gives advice to the Governor-General of Saint Lucia for the appointment of a minority of senators in the Senate of Saint Lucia.

== Leaders of the Opposition ==
Name	Took office	Left office	Party	Notes
George Charles	June 1964	April 1974	SLP	
Allan Louisy	June 1974	July 1979	SLP	
John Compton	July 1979	June 1982	UWP	
Neville Cenac	June 1982	March 1987	SLP	
Julian Hunte	May 1987	February 1996	SLP	
Velon John	February 1996	May 1997	SLP	
Louis George	May 1997	November 2001	UWP	
Marius Wilson	December 2001	January 2003	UWP	
Arsene James	January 2003	April 2004	UWP	
Marcus Nicholas	April 2004	November 2006	UWP	
Kenny Anthony	December 2006	November 2011	SLP	
Stephenson King	November 2011	January 2014	UWP	
Gale Rigobert	1 February 2014	19 May 2016	UWP	
Philip J. Pierre	18 June 2016	28 July 2021	SLP	
Allen Chastanet	30 July 2021	Incumbent	UWP	

== See also ==
- Politics of Saint Lucia
- House of Assembly of Saint Lucia
- Prime Minister of Saint Lucia
