= George Charles =

Saint Lucian politician

The Honourable Sir George Charles KCMG CBE SLC

Chief Minister of Saint Lucia
- In office 1 January 1960 – April 1964
- Monarch: Elizabeth II
- Administrator: Earl of Oxford and Asquith; Gerald Jackson Bryan
- Succeeded by: John Compton

Personal details
- Born: 7 June 1916
- Died: 26 June 2004 (aged 88)
- Party: Saint Lucia Labour Party
- Relatives: Errol Charles (son)

Sir George Frederick Lawrence Charles KCMG CBE SLC (7 June 1916 – 26 June 2004) was a trade unionist, politician, founder of the Saint Lucia Labour Party and Chief Minister of Saint Lucia (1 January 1960 – 25 April 1964). He is a recipient of Saint Lucia's second-highest honour, the St. Lucia Cross (1987), and was knighted in 1988 by Queen Elizabeth II. George F. L. Charles Airport, in Castries, Saint Lucia, is named in his honour.

Born on 7 June 1916, George Charles had a privileged education at St. Mary's College. But like many young West Indians of his time, he migrated to Aruba and worked there for a year with the Largo Oil and Transport Company. In Aruba, he was exposed to trade union activities and on his return to Saint Lucia, in 1945, he championed the cause of the workers at the Vigie Airport - now George F. L. Charles Airport - Renovation Project, where he was employed as a timekeeper. His solidarity on that occasion propelled him to the General Secretaryship of the Saint Lucia Workers Cooperative Union.

Sir George played an increasingly active role in trade unionism and by 1948 was elected to the Castries Town Board, as trade union representative. He stepped up the efforts to secure a more democratic mode of representation and in 1950, he and his father James Charles were among the key personalities involved in the organization of the Saint Lucia Labour Party (SLP). The SLP immediately became the dominant force in Saint Lucia for over a decade. He and his party had a moderate socialist agenda, emphasizing workers' rights and more autonomy, or independence, for Saint Lucia - then an overseas colony of the United Kingdom.

In the 1951 general elections, the first held under universal adult suffrage, the St. Lucia Labour Party under his leadership won five of the eight seats against the middle class-oriented Peoples Progressive Party. Sir George's first resolution as an elected member was for legal recognition of the right to paid leave, which was rejected by the Colonial Authorities. The Labour Party was again victorious in 1954 general elections.

The struggle that Sir George led resulted in a series of constitutional reforms, obtaining a responsible ministerial government system. Sir George was named as the first Chief Minister (1960 reform), as well as first Minister for Education and Social Affairs.

Charles was Chief Minister until April 1964 when the government fell. The SLP subsequently lost the elections for the first time. From then on, Charles played a lesser role in politics. After Charles' tenure as Chief Minister, the SLP spent most of the next three decades in opposition, and he was Leader of the Opposition from 1964 to 1974. The SLP returned to power from 1979 to 1982, from 1997 to 2006, and again from 2011.

Charles, knighted a Knight Commander of The Order of Saint Michael and Saint George (KCMG) by Queen Elizabeth II in the 1998 Birthday Honours List, received his country's second-highest honour, the St. Lucia Cross in 1987.

Sir George Charles died on 26 June 2004 at age 88, after a short illness.
