= Jeannine Compton-Antoine =

Saint Lucian marine biologist and politician

Personal details
- Party: United Workers Party |(till 2011) Independent
- Relations: John Compton (father)

Jeannine Compton-Antoine is a Saint Lucian politician who represented the Micoud North constituency in the House of Assembly from 2007 to 2011. She won the seat for the United Workers Party in a 2007 by-election. Compton-Antoine resigned from the United Workers Party in 2011, and continued to serve as an independent MP. She lost the seat in the 2011 general election.

In July 2012, she was selected to be chair of the International Whaling Commission.

Compton-Antoine is the daughter of John Compton, former Prime Minister of Saint Lucia.
