= Lenard Montoute =

Saint Lucian politician

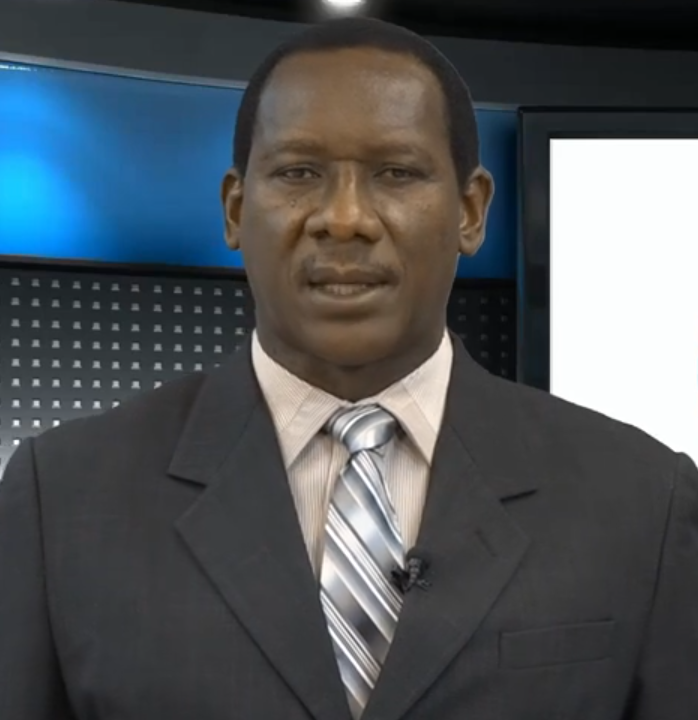
- Montoute in 2020

Member of Parliament for Gros Islet
- In office 6 June 2016 – 26 July 2021
- Succeeded by: Kenson Casimir

Minister for Equity, Social Justice, Empowerment, Youth Development, Sports and Local Government
- In office 14 June 2016 – 26 July 2021

Personal details
- Born: Peter Lenard "Spider" Montoute; 30 June 1962 (age 63)
- Party: United Workers Party (Saint Lucia)

Peter Lenard "Spider" Montoute (born 30 June 1962) is a Saint Lucian politician and former Minister and parliamentary representative for Gros Islet for the United Workers Party (UWP). Montoute lost his seat in the 2021 Saint Lucian general election to Kenson Casimir; this was a landslide victory for the Saint Lucia Labour Party.

== Political career ==
Montoute represented Gros Islet constituency from 2006 to 2011. He was the Minister for Social Transformation, Public Service, Human Resource Development and Youth and Sports.

He won the Gros Islet seat in the general election held on 11 December 2006. Montoute was also deputy leader of the United Workers Party and was considered a top contender for the leadership of the party, although he is also considered a political novice. Montoute began his career as an active politician in 2001. He lost his bid to Mario Michel by less than 500 votes and claimed a moral victory which he then parlayed into the longest, most consistent campaign for a seat ever seen in St Lucia. His hard work paid off with a big victory against former Labour Party leader, President of the United Nations General Assembly and Foreign Minister Julian Hunte.

Montoute was sworn in as Minister for Social Transformation, Human Services, Family Affairs, Youth and Sports on 19 December 2006 as part of the government of Prime Minister John Compton following the UWP electoral victory. His portfolio partially changed in a cabinet reshuffle under Prime Minister Stephenson King on 12 September 2007, following Compton's death; Montoute became Minister for Social Transformation, Public Service, Human Resource Development and Youth and Sports. There were many reports linking him to a bid to replace Stephenson King as leader of the government in 2008 but these ended when King fired Economic Affairs minister Ausbert D'auvergne and reinstated Choiseul MP Rufus Bousquet to the cabinet.

Montoute lost the Gros Islet seat in the 2011 general election. He was an opposition member of the Saint Lucia Senate from 2012 to 2014. He contested and won back the Gros Islet seat in the 2016 general election.
