= 1974 Saint Lucian general election =

General election results for Saint Lucia in 1974

- 7 May 1974

All 17 seats in the House of Assembly 9 seats needed for a majority
- Turnout: 84.38% (▲30.52pp)
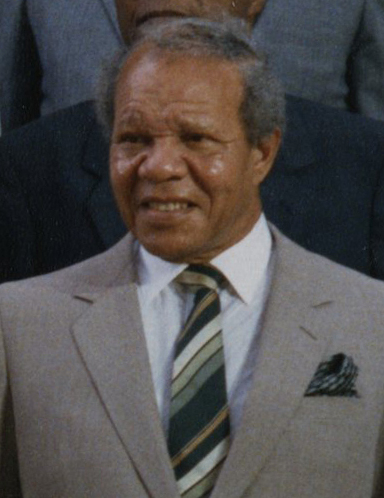

	First party	Second party
Leader	John Compton	Allan Louisy
Party	UWP	Labour Party
Last election	58.60%, 6 seats	35.62%, 3 seats
Seats won	10	7
Seat change	▲4	▲4
Popular vote	17,390	14,554
Percentage	53.35%	44.65%
Swing	▼5.25pp	▲9.03pp
- Results by constituency
Premier before election
John Compton
UWP
Elected Premier
John Compton
UWP

General elections were held in Saint Lucia on 7 May 1974. The result was a victory for the United Workers Party, which won ten of the seventeen seats. Voter turnout was 84.4%.

== Results ==
Party	Votes	%	Seats	+/–
United Workers Party	17,390	53.35	10	+4
Saint Lucia Labour Party	14,554	44.65	7	+4
Independents	650	1.99	0	New
Total	32,594	100.00	17	+7
Valid votes	32,594	97.04		
Invalid/blank votes	994	2.96		
Total votes	33,588	100.00		
Registered voters/turnout	39,805	84.38		
Source: Caribbean Elections
