= 1992 Saint Lucian general election =

- 27 April 1992

All 17 seats in the House of Assembly 9 seats needed for a majority
- Turnout: 62.79% (▼1.93pp)
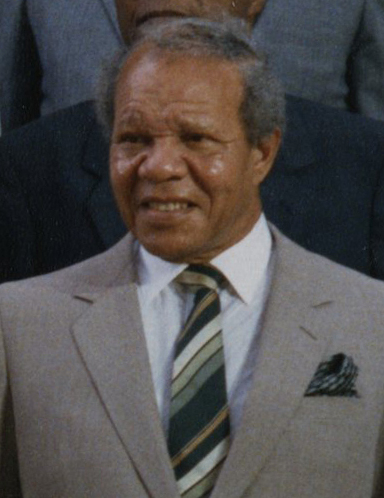

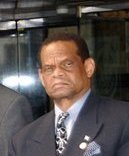
	First party	Second party
Leader	John Compton	Julian Hunte
Party	UWP	Labour Party
Last election	53.18%, 9 seats	40.80%, 8 seats
Seats won	11	6
Seat change	▲2	▼2
Popular vote	33,562	25,565
Percentage	56.67%	43.17%
Swing	▲3.49pp	▲2.37pp
- Results by constituency
Prime Minister before election
John Compton
UWP
Subsequent Prime Minister
John Compton
UWP

General elections were held in Saint Lucia on 27 April 1992. The result was a victory for the United Workers Party, which won eleven of the seventeen seats. Voter turnout was 62.8%.

== Results ==
Party	Votes	%	Seats	+/–
United Workers Party	33,562	56.67	11	+2
Saint Lucia Labour Party	25,565	43.17	6	–2
People's Progressive Party	97	0.16	0	New
Total	59,224	100.00	17	0
Valid votes	59,224	96.84		
Invalid/blank votes	1,931	3.16		
Total votes	61,155	100.00		
Registered voters/turnout	97,403	62.79		
Source: Nohlen
