= Fiona Compton =

Saint Lucian artist and historian

- Born: Saint Lucia
- Occupations: Artist, historian
- Parents: John Compton (father); Janice Barbara Compton (mother)
- Website: Official website

Fiona Compton is an artist and Caribbean historian from Saint Lucia. Her work has explored the various disparities in representation of the Afro Caribbean diaspora within art and mainstream media, exhibiting as part of a collective and in solo presentations across the U.K, Europe, the Caribbean, USA.

She is the founder of the online platform Know Your Caribbean, the number one online platform for Caribbean history and culture in the world, with a global monthly reach in its millions.

== Biography ==
Compton is one of the five children of politician John Compton, the first prime minister of Saint Lucia, and Janice Barbara Compton. She is the goddaughter of Charles III, King of Saint Lucia. In 2013, her youngest sister Nina Compton finished second and was voted as "fan favourite" on American reality cooking show Top Chef.

Compton works for publishing houses in the UK, taking photographs of European officials in the finance and banking industries. She is an ambassador for Notting Hill Carnival, a two-day festival in London.
