= 1961 Saint Lucian general election =

General election results for Saint Lucia in 1961

- 14 April 1961

All 10 seats in the House of Assembly 6 seats needed for a majority

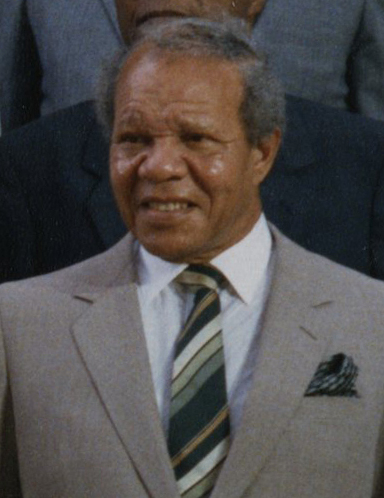
	First party	Second party
Leader	George Charles	John Compton
Party	Labour Party	People's Progressive Party
Last election	66.47%, 7 seats	28.42%, 1 seat
Seats won	9	1
Seat change	▲2	Steady
Popular vote	11,898	6,244
Percentage	61.45%	32.25%
Swing	▼5.02pp	▲2.91pp
- Results by constituency
Chief Minister before election
Office established
Elected Chief Minister
George Charles
Labour Party

General elections were held in Saint Lucia on 14 April 1961. The result was a victory for the Saint Lucia Labour Party, which won nine of the ten seats.

== Results ==
Party	Votes	%	Seats	+/–
Saint Lucia Labour Party	11,898	61.45	9	+2
People's Progressive Party	6,244	32.25	1	0
Independents	1,220	6.30	0	0
Total	19,362	100.00	10	+2
Source: Nohlen
