= 1969 Saint Lucian general election =

General election results in Saint Lucia for 1969

- 25 April 1969

All 10 seats in the House of Assembly 6 seats needed for a majority
- Turnout: 53.86% (▲2.04pp)
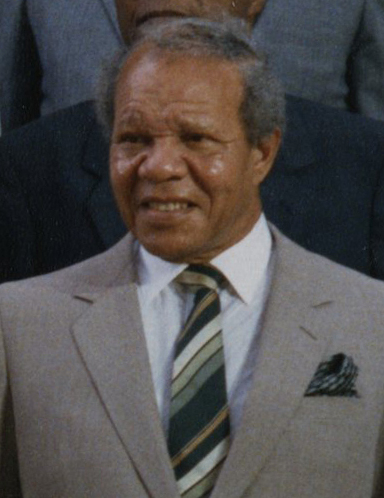

	First party	Second party
Leader	John Compton	Kenneth Foster
Party	UWP	Labour Party
Last election	51.51%, 6 seats	30.08%, 2 seats
Seats won	6	3
Seat change	Steady	▲1
Popular vote	13,606	5,614
Percentage	58.60%	35.62%
Swing	▲7.09pp	▲4.94pp
- Results by constituency
Premier before election
John Compton
UWP
Elected Premier
John Compton
UWP

General elections were held in Saint Lucia on 25 April 1969. The result was a victory for the United Workers Party, which won six of the ten seats. Voter turnout was 53.9%.

== Results ==
Party	Votes	%	Seats	+/–
United Workers Party	13,606	58.60	6	0
Saint Lucia Labour Party	8,270	35.62	3	+1
SLP–United Front	1,342	5.78	1	New
Total	23,218	100.00	10	0
Valid votes	23,218	96.07		
Invalid/blank votes	950	3.93		
Total votes	24,168	100.00		
Registered voters/turnout	44,868	53.86		
Source: Caribbean Elections
