= 1982 Saint Lucian general election =

- 3 May 1982

All 17 seats in the House of Assembly 9 seats needed for a majority
- Turnout: 65.80% (▼2.21pp)
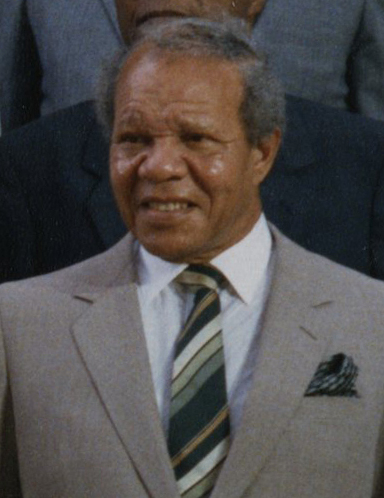

	First party	Second party	Third party
Leader	John Compton	Peter Josie	Jon Odlum
Party	UWP	Labour Party	PLP
Last election	43.79%, 5 seats	56.21%, 12 seats	–
Seats won	14	2	1
Seat change	▲9	▼10	New
Popular vote	27,252	8,122	13,133
Percentage	56.18%	16.27%	27.07%
Swing	▲12.39pp	▼39.47pp	New
- Results by constituency
Prime Minister before election
Michael Pilgrim
PLP
Subsequent Prime Minister
John Compton
UWP

General elections were held in Saint Lucia on 3 May 1982. The result was a victory for the United Workers Party, which won fourteen of the seventeen seats. Voter turnout was 65.8%.

== Results ==
Graph of the party split among 17 seats.
Party	Votes	%	Seats	+/–
United Workers Party	27,252	56.18	14	+9
Progressive Labour Party	13,133	27.07	1	New
Saint Lucia Labour Party	8,122	16.74	2	–10
Total	48,507	100.00	17	0
Valid votes	48,507	97.82		
Invalid/blank votes	1,083	2.18		
Total votes	49,590	100.00		
Registered voters/turnout	75,363	65.80		
Source: Caribbean Elections
