= April 1987 Saint Lucian general election =

April 1987 Saint Lucian general election may refer to:

- 6 April 1987 Saint Lucian general election, a general election held on 6 April
- 30 April 1987 Saint Lucian general election, a general election held on 30 April
