= Michael Pilgrim =

Former prime minister of Saint Lucia

Bryan Michael Pilgrim (born 3 January 1947) is a Saint Lucian politician and former prime minister.

He was appointed as a minister within the office of Prime Minister Allan Louisy after Saint Lucia Labour Party victory in the elections of 1979. However, he fell out with the Labour party in 1982. He served as 4th prime minister of Saint Lucia (acting prime minister) after the resignation of Winston Cenac on 17 January 1982. He also held the additional portfolio of Minister of Finance. As agreed he served for four months. He campaigned in the 1982 elections as Progressive Labour Party candidate, but lost. He was succeeded as prime minister in May 1982 by John Compton, leader of the United Workers' Party.

He campaigned in both of the 1987 elections as a candidate of Progressive Labour Party candidate, but lost. Then Pilgrim set up his own accounting firm. However, in the elections of 1992 he campaigned as United Workers Party (UWP) candidate, but lost.

== See also ==
- United Workers Party (Saint Lucia)
- Progressive Labour Party (Saint Lucia)
- Politics of Saint Lucia
- List of prime ministers of Saint Lucia

Political offices
Preceded by Winston Cenac	Prime Minister of Saint Lucia (acting); 1982	Succeeded by John Compton
