= Hunter J. Francois =

Saint Lucian lawyer and politician

Hunter J. François (CBE) (19 February 1924 – 15 November 2014) was a Saint Lucian lawyer and politician.

Born in Choiseul on the West Coast of the island.

François entered local politics in 1954, when he contested the electoral district of Choiseul, as an independent candidate. He ran against GA Mason of the St. Lucia Labour Party (SLP) and IG John of the People's Progressive Party (PPP). François came in third with John taking the seat. Seven years later, he joined the PPP, the party which represented the planter and establishment class. He was their candidate in East Castries in the 1961 elections against H B Collymore. At that time East Castries included Morne Du Don where Francois lived. Once more he was unsuccessful, registering 661 votes to Collymore's 979.

His fortunes changed in 1964 when he contested the historic 1964 elections for a newly formed party- the United Workers party (UWP) which was a merger between the PPP and National Labour Movement (NLM) of John Compton. Francois again ran for East Castries and this time turned the tables on HB Collymore, polling 821 votes to the latter's 661.

In the 1969 elections he staved off a formidable challenge for East Castries from Kenneth Foster, the leader of the SLP. In an election in which the UWP government lost two seats, François prevented them from losing a third and avoided the country being faced with a hung parliament, when he won over Foster by 43 votes. If Francois had lost East Castries, both the UWP and the SLP would have had five seats each.

He was Minister of Education, Health and Social Services from 1964 to 1974. He represented East Castries constituency for the United Workers Party, winning the seat in the 1964 general election. He was appointed deputy premier when Saint Lucia got associated statehood. In 1972, he resigned from the cabinet. In 1974, he subsequently joined the SLP and fought the elections of that year for that party in Central Castries against incumbent Trade Minister George Mallet of the UWP and Julian R Hunte, then an independent candidate who had also just parted ways with the UWP. George Mallet beat them both comfortably.

As Education Minister, François established the forerunner to Sir Arthur Lewis Community College. The Hunter J. François Library at the college is named in his honor.

After failing to win his seat in the 1974 general elections, François retired from politics.

He later held the position of Parliamentary Commissioner and chairman of the Board of Radio St. Lucia. After giving up these posts, he retired from public life.

== Personal life ==
François was married to Olive François.

François was also an accomplished pianist who had studied under Chester Catlow, an American concert pianist who had retired to Saint Lucia. His gift for music was passed on to his children several of whom became musicians, with one of them, Luther François, his son, has gone on to becoming one of the Caribbean's most celebrated saxophonists. Hunter François indeed made a varied and sterling contribution to the development of St. Lucia.

In February 2014, the government named a road in Monchy, Gros Islet where he lived, the Hunter J. François Drive.

== Death ==
Hunter J François, passed away in the early hours of Saturday, 15 November 2014 at the Tapion Hospital, St. Lucia after a prolonged illness. He was 90 years.
