= People's Progressive Party (Saint Lucia) =

Political party in Saint Lucia

The People's Progressive Party was a political party in Saint Lucia. It was the only opposition party in the country from 1951 until 1964.

== History ==
The party was established in 1950, and lost the 1951 elections to the Saint Lucia Labour Party. Elections held in 1954, 1957 and 1961 saw the same outcome, with the PPP and independent candidates never winning more than three seats. Shortly before the 1964 elections the party merged with the National Labour Movement, a breakaway faction from the Labour Party to form the United Workers' Party, which went on to win the elections.

The party was resurrected for the 1992 elections, but received just 97 votes and failed to win a seat. They did not contest any further elections.
