= Royal tours of Saint Lucia =

Visits to Saint Lucia by royals

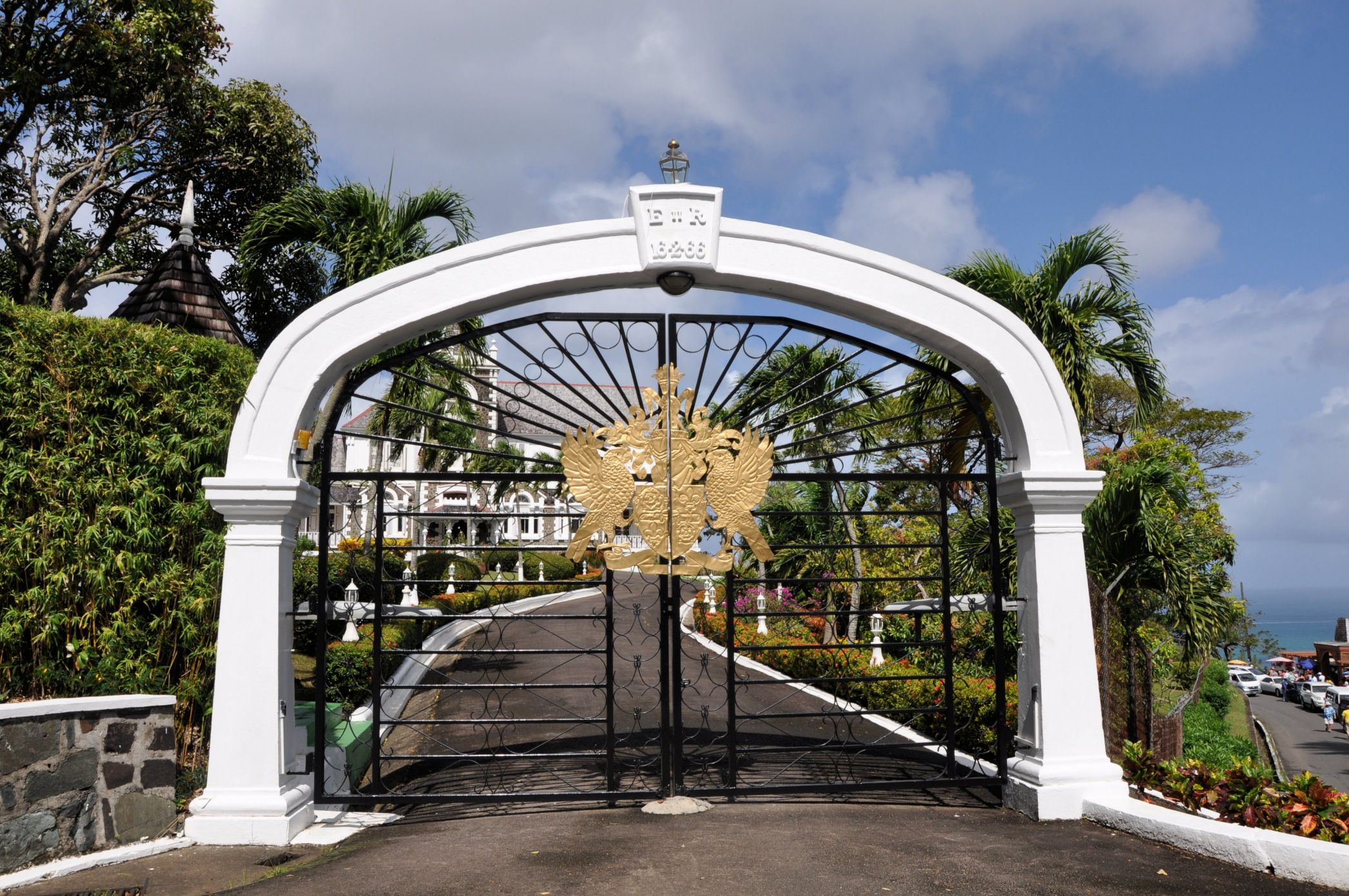
The arch above the gates of Government House, Castries, featuring an inscription marking Queen Elizabeth II's first ever visit to Saint Lucia on 16 February 1966

Royal tours of Saint Lucia by its royal family have been taking place since the 20th century. Elizabeth II, Queen of Saint Lucia (r. 1979–2022), visited the country twice; in 1966, and 1985.

Other members of the royal family have also paid visits.

== 20th century ==
The Queen and the Duke of Edinburgh in Saint Lucia, 1966

Queen Elizabeth II visited Saint Lucia for the first time during her Caribbean tour of 1966. They visited the island on 16 February, where she opened the Winban Research Centre. She and her husband also enjoyed traditional dancing and steel band music on board HMY Britannia and watched a fireworks display from Point Seraphin.

Princess Alexandra represented the Queen at the independence celebrations in 1979. She opened the first session of the new parliament on 22 February, on behalf of the Queen. On 23 February, the Princess opened the Pigeon Island National Park to the public.

The Queen of Saint Lucia visited on 26 October 1985. The day was declared a public holiday to honour her visit. The Queen laid the foundation stone for a new Red Cross headquarters, visited a residential home for the elderly and visited the Girls' Vocational School where they met children involved with The Duke of Edinburgh's Award Scheme on the island.

Charles, Prince of Wales visited in 1989 to attend the celebrations marking the tenth anniversary of independence.

Prince Philip, Duke of Edinburgh visited in March 1998, in his capacity as founder and chairman of the International Trustees of The Duke of Edinburgh's Award International Association. During his visit on 24 March, the Duke attended a Rotary Club Lunch at the Indies Restaurant, Castries, and later attended a meeting of the Award Council, followed by a Reception at Government House for young people who have reached the Gold Standard in The Duke of Edinburgh's Award.

== 21st century ==
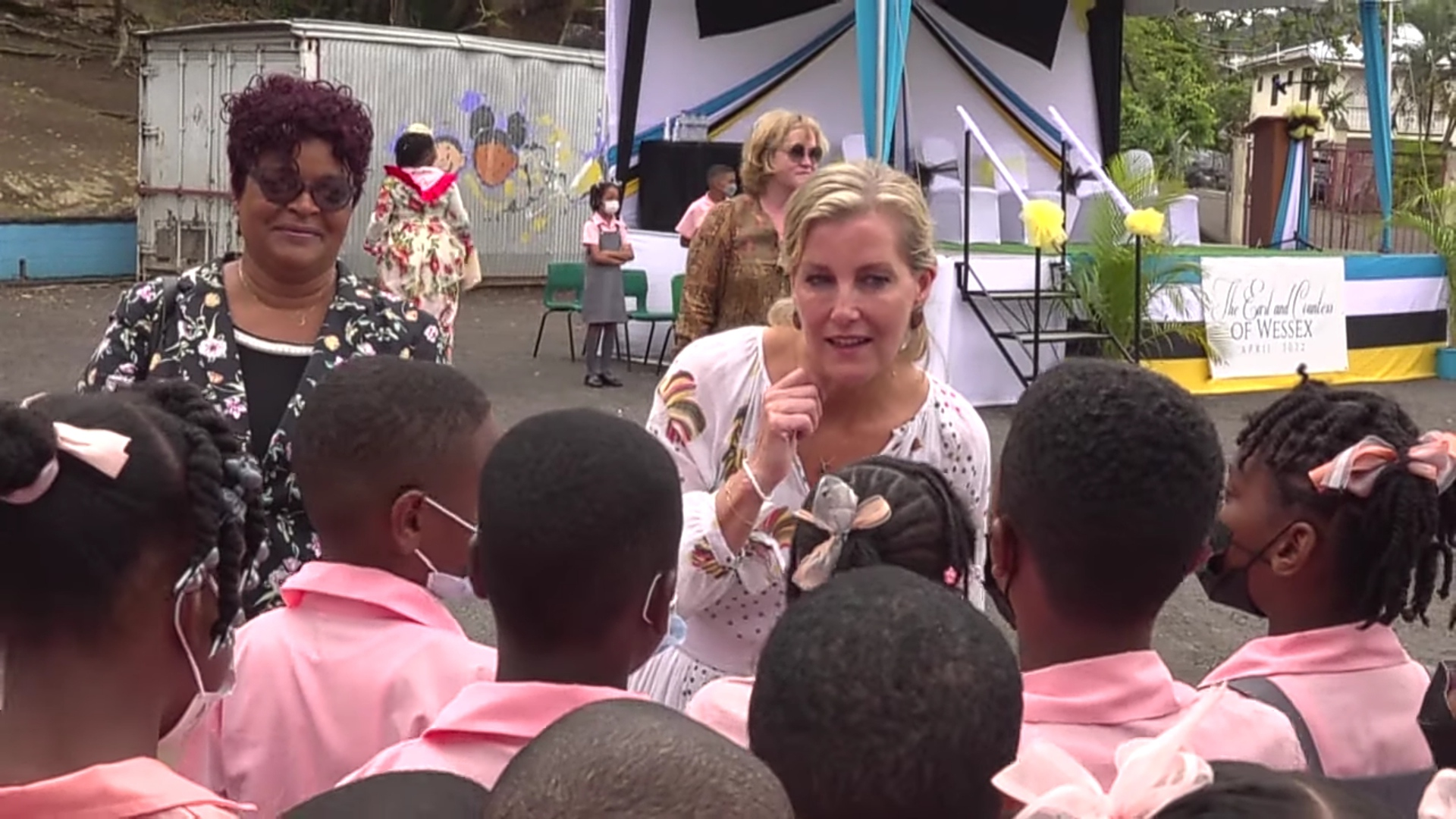
The Countess of Wessex meeting schoolchildren during her Platinum Jubilee Tour of Saint Lucia, 2022

Prince Andrew, Duke of York visited in February 2004 to mark the island's 25th anniversary of independence. On 21 February, the Duke attended a National Youth Rally at Beausejar Cricket Ground, a Reception on board HMS Monmouth, Castries, and visited Ciceron School. He laid a wreath at the Commonwealth War Graves Cemetery, and later attended the Independence Gala Performance at Mindoo Phillip Park. On 22 February, the Duke attended the Independence Day Parade, and later visited the National Skills Development Centre, la Place Carenage, and the National Exhibition at Castries.

The Prince of Wales and Duchess of Cornwall, visited Saint Lucia in March 2008. They arrived on 7 March and were received by the Governor-General Dame Pearlette Louisy, and later visited the Fond Doux Estate. The Prince visited Rabot Estate, Hotel Chocolat, held a meeting on sustainable eco-tourism, and later launched the National Youth Mentoring Programme and Chamber of Commerce's Young Business Trust at the Prime Minister's residence. The Prince and the Duchess later attended a reception hosted by the Governor-General at Government House.

I know that she regards her role as your head of state and your Queen as being an enormous privilege as you have developed as a nation the fact that you wanted to remain as a realm and wanted the Queen to remain as your Queen, is something that has always meant a great deal to her and she has always taken a particular interest in all of her realms and she follows your fortunes here in Saint Lucia with great interest.

— Prince Edward, Earl of Wessex, 2012

Edward and Sophie, the Earl and Countess of Wessex, visited in 2012 to commemorate the Queen's Diamond Jubilee. The couple arrived on 21 February, and later opened Le Pavilion Museum for the Diamond Jubilee, and afterwards attended a reception at Government House. On 22 February, the Earl and Countess attended the Independence Day Parade and celebrations at the Sab, Vigie, and later attended a youth performance and cultural display to celebrate the Queen's Diamond Jubilee at the Sandals Grande St. Lucian Spa and Beech Resort, Pigeon Island Causeway. The couple later attended a reception for young people who have achieved the Gold Standard in The Duke of Edinburgh's Award, and later visited the Headquarters of the St. John Association of Saint Lucia, George V Park, Castries, where the Countess launched the new website. The couple afterwards visited St. Lucia School of Music, Tapion, Castries, and attended a Recital, and attended the St. Lucia Independence Day Reception hosted by the prime minister. In his speech welcoming the royal couple, Prime Minister Kenny D. Anthony said:

Your Royal Highnesses, ours is long and colourful history. The fact that so much of our story is shared with you, your family, your country and other members of the Commonwealth makes it even more remarkable. Indeed, that sense of community has sustained and guided us through many travails, for as a small developing country, we have been many things, but never alone.

Prince Harry visited in November 2016. He received an official welcome at Pointe Seraphine, and later attended a reception hosted by the Governor-General at Government House. The next day, the Prince saw an exhibition cricket match at the Darren Sammy Cricket Ground. At Pigeon Island, the Prince attended an outdoor exhibition highlighting various conservation projects run by the young people of Saint Lucia, and unveiled the dedication plaque designating the Castries Water Works Reserve and surrounding rainforest as Saint Lucia's contribution to The Queen's Commonwealth Canopy. After departing Pigeon Island, the Prince Harry took part in a sod turning for a racecourse at the development for the St Lucia Turf Club. The Prince then travelled by boat from the north of St Lucia to the south-western town of Soufriere, where he attended a St Lucian street festival.

I am delighted to return to Saint Lucia and to have this opportunity to see so many of you once again. My wife and I have particularly fondly memories of our last visit here, in 2008, as indeed I have from my time on the West Indies Station when I was serving in the Royal Navy back in 1973.

— Charles, Prince of Wales, 2019

Charles, Prince of Wales visited in 2019 to celebrate the 40th anniversary of Saint Lucia's independence. The Prince was greeted at the airport by Prime Minister Allen Chastanet and Governor-General Sir Emmanuel Neville Cenac. The Prince then travelled to the Philip Marcellin Grounds to watch a ceremony and military parade. The Prince presented the Commonwealth Points of Light Award to the President of Faces of Cancer St Lucia Dorothy Phillips, on behalf of the Queen. In the evening, the Prince attended a reception hosted by the Governor-General for the 500 guests, including Members of Parliament, groups of Commonwealth Awardees and representatives from the Arts and Culture scene in Saint Lucia.

External videos
- Royal Visit - His Royal Highness Prince Charles, Prince of Wales; Source: Saint Lucia Government.

Edward and Sophie, the Earl and Countess of Wessex, visited in 2022 to mark the Queen's Platinum Jubilee. They arrived in Saint Lucia on 22 April, and later met Prime Minister Philip J. Pierre, and acting Governor-General Errol Charles. On 24 April, they attended a jubilee church service and visited Morne Fortune. On 27 April, they met locals in Soufrière. They also toured a cocoa plantation and met representatives of female-led businesses before visiting Sulphur Springs and having lunch with the prime minister. They also watched a performance by young people at the Mini Stadium. On 28 April, they wrapped up their tour by meeting pupils from six separate Saint Lucian schools.

== See also ==
- Monarchy of Saint Lucia
- Governor-General of Saint Lucia
- Government House, Saint Lucia
- List of Commonwealth visits made by Elizabeth II
