= 1997 Saint Lucian general election =

- 23 May 1997

All 17 seats in the House of Assembly 9 seats needed for a majority
- Turnout: 66.05% (▲3.26pp)
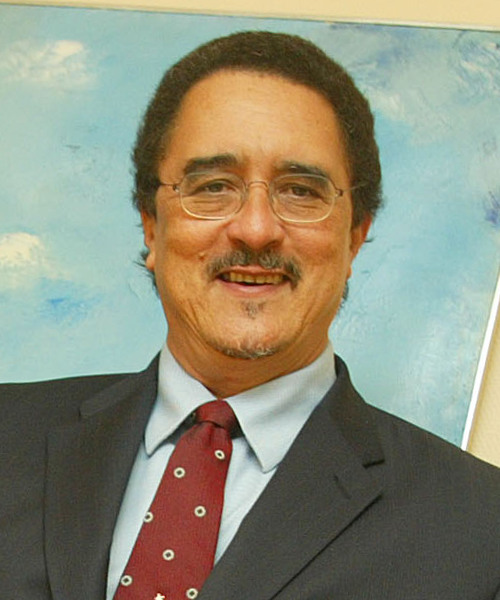

	First party	Second party
Leader	Kenny Anthony	Vaughan Lewis
Party	Labour Party	UWP
Last election	43.17%, 16 seats	56.67%, 11 seats
Seats won	16	1
Seat change	▲10	▼10
Popular vote	44,153	25,565
Percentage	61.35%	36.58%
Swing	▲18.18pp	▼20.09pp
- Results by constituency
Prime Minister before election
Vaughan Lewis
UWP
Subsequent Prime Minister
Kenny Anthony
Labour Party

General elections were held in Saint Lucia on 23 May 1997. The result was a victory for the Saint Lucia Labour Party, which won sixteen of the seventeen seats. Voter turnout was 66.1%.

== Results ==
Party	Votes	%	Seats	+/–
Saint Lucia Labour Party	44,153	61.35	16	+8
United Workers Party	26,325	36.58	1	–8
Independents	1,494	2.08	0	New
Total	71,972	100.00	17	0
Valid votes	71,972	97.87		
Invalid/blank votes	1,563	2.13		
Total votes	73,535	100.00		
Registered voters/turnout	111,330	66.05		
Source: Nohlen, IPU
