= Peter Josie =

Saint Lucian politician and trade unionist

Member of Parliament for Castries East
- In office 1974–1982

Member of Parliament for Vieux Fort South
- In office 1987–1997

Personal details
- Born: 26 September 1941 (age 84)
- Party: Saint Lucia Labour Party; United Workers Party

Peter Josie is a retired Saint Lucian politician and trade unionist. He served as a member of the House of Assembly from 1974 to 1982 and again from 1987 to 1997. He served as President of the Seamen and Waterfront Workers Union, the National Farmers Union, and the Technical and Allied Workers Union. He was leader of the Saint Lucia Labour Party and the Organisation for National Enlightenment.

== Career ==
Peter Josie was born on 26 September 1941 in Vieux-Fort, the southernmost town of Saint Lucia. He attended Saint Mary's College, the all-boys' elite secondary school in Castries. He earned a bachelor's degree in agronomy from the University of the West Indies in Trinidad. Josie is the only surviving member of the Saint Lucia group of delegates which discussed and negotiated independence for Saint Lucia from the British Government.

The firebrand leftist Peter Josie was an attendee at the famous but secret meeting of leftist minds on the minuscule Rat Island in 1970, which included members of Grenada's future revolutionary leadership. At the time governments were suspicious of the motives of these new entrants into the political fray. So fearful were they that they banned the revolutionaries from entering several territories. In one such case, on 16 April 1970, S.R. Slater, the Minister of Home Affairs in Saint Vincent deemed Josie, together with other activists as Dave Darbeau, Geddes Granger (now Makandal Daaga) and Robert "Bobby" Clarke, to be a prohibited immigrant.

He joined the Saint Lucia Labour Party in 1973. He served from 1974 to 1982 as a Member of Parliament for Castries East on the ticket of the Saint Lucia Labour Party. He began his career as Minister of Agriculture, Lands and Fisheries and then Minister of Foreign Affairs. Josie was the Deputy Prime Minister in the cabinet of Winston Cenac. After the ill-fated Labour Government fell, he led it unsuccessfully in the general elections of 1982. In 1984 Julian Hunte was elected the party leader, and Josie as his deputy. He continued with the party and won his seat as an MP for Vieux Fort South in 1987.

He had originally entered the political sphere as a Black Power proponent and member of the Saint Lucia Forum, together with other well-known political figures such as Hilford Deterville, Julian Hunte and George Odlum, which addressed mainly urban Saint Lucia on a new radical platform for Saint Lucia's development. It was with the latter he was always associated as they led an agricultural workers trade union and galvanised the then marginalised rural farm labourers.

Josie was the perfect foil for the suave Oxford-educated Odlum. Whilst Odlum deployed his oratorical skills laced with a command of sometimes stuffy but entertaining English, Josie was more direct, making effective use of the widely spoken French Creole to sometimes telling incendiary effect.

He was a major controversial player in the ill-fated Labour Party government which was riven by internal wrangling when it formed the government during the abbreviated term between 1979 and 1982. Odlum and Josie were to fall out in spectacular fashion as they acrimoniously parted ways, before the fall of the government.

He was thrown out of the Labour Party after campaigning against then leader Julian Hunte for the post of political leader. He switched allegiance to the ruling United Workers Party and became one of its two Ministers with responsibility for Agriculture.

He failed to retain his seat in the 1997 general elections. After the elections he formed a group, the Organisation for National Enlightenment (ONE), which he would abandon in the attempt to form a National Alliance with his former arch-enemies, John Compton and George Odlum. When this coalition floundered and the Alliance splintered, he took to the hustings in 2001 and to make an impression in his old stomping grounds, Castries East on the platform of the National Front. He last appeared at the hustings when he campaigned for Richard Frederick in the by-election of 2005 and the General Elections of 2006.

On 11 February 2012 Josie launched his autobiography, Shattered Dreams at the Bay Gardens Hotel. Josie is now closely associated with the campaign of Allen Chastanet, both in attaining the leadership of the opposition United Workers Party and in becoming Prime Minister of Saint Lucia.
