= Winston Cenac =

Saint Lucian politician (1925–2004)

3rd Prime Minister of Saint Lucia
- In office 4 May 1981 – 17 January 1982
- Monarch: Elizabeth II
- Governor-General: Boswell Williams
- Deputy: Peter Josie
- Preceded by: Allan Louisy
- Succeeded by: Michael Pilgrim (acting)

Personal details
- Born: Winston Francis Cenac; 14 September 1925
- Died: 22 September 2004 (aged 79)
- Resting place: Castries City Cemetery
- Party: Saint Lucia Labour Party
- Relatives: Neville Cenac (brother)
- Education: University of London

Winston Francis Cenac Q.C. (14 September 1925 – 22 September 2004) was a civil servant and politician from Saint Lucia. He was the third elected Prime Minister of independent Saint Lucia.

== Life ==
In 1952 he obtained the bachelor of laws of London University as an external student. He was appointed the attorney general of Saint Lucia in 1964. He was also the attorney general of Saint Vincent in 1967 and attorney general of Grenada from 1967 to 1970. In 1971, Cenac acted as judge in Saint Kitts for six months.

He served as General Procurator for Saint Lucia, Saint Vincent and the Grenadines and Grenada. In 1969 he gave up public service to become a lawyer. Elected representative when the Saint Lucia Labour Party gained power in 1979, Cenac became attorney general in the Allan Louisy administration. Cenac became Prime Minister upon Louisy's resignation on 4 May 1981. He also held the additional portfolio of Minister of Finance. He served for 8 months until he too was forced into resignation on 17 January 1982. he was replaced in his position by Michael Pilgrim.

He died on 22 September 2004 and is buried in Castries City Cemetery.

== Family ==
His brother, Sir Neville Cenac, was also a prominent politician in Saint Lucia until his appointment as Governor-General in 2018.

== See also ==
- Saint Lucia Labour Party
- List of prime ministers of Saint Lucia
- Politics of Saint Lucia

Political offices
Preceded by Allan Louisy	Prime Minister of Saint Lucia; 1981–1982	Succeeded by Michael Pilgrim
