= Progressive Labour Party (Saint Lucia) =

Former political party in Saint Lucia

- Chairperson: George Odlum
- Founded: 1981
- Dissolved: 1987 (defunct)
- Split from: Saint Lucia Labour Party

The Progressive Labour Party (PLP) was a political party in Saint Lucia that existed from its foundation in 1981 by former deputy prime minister George Odlum until the 30 April 1987 general election.

== History ==
The party was founded in 1981 by former deputy prime minister George Odlum when he and other members of Saint Lucia Labour Party broke away from the party after Odlum had lost the leadership election. Michael Pilgrim became deputy leader of the party, and later interim prime minister for four months before the 1982 elections.

It first contested national elections in 1982, when it finished second behind the United Workers' Party with 27.1% of the vote, but only won a single seat, taken by Jon Odlum, brother of George Odlum.

Julian Hunte refused an alliance with PLP in the two subsequent elections in 1987. In the 6 April 1987 elections the party's vote share fell to 9.3% and they lost their single seat. The party received 6.0% of the vote in the early elections held later in the month and remained seatless. They did not contest any further elections.
