= 1979 Saint Lucian general election =

- 2 July 1979

All 17 seats in the House of Assembly 9 seats needed for a majority
- Turnout: 68.01% (▼16.37pp)

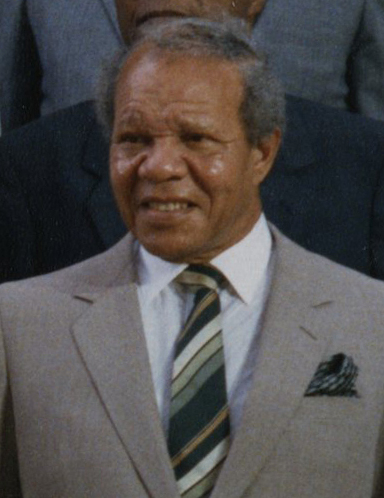
	First party	Second party
Leader	Allan Louisy	John Compton
Party	Labour Party	UWP
Last election	44.65%, 7 seats	53.35%, 10 seats
Seats won	12	5
Seat change	▲5	▼5
Popular vote	25,294	19,706
Percentage	56.21%	43.79%
Swing	▲11.56pp	▼9.56pp
- Results by constituency
Prime Minister before election
John Compton
UWP
Subsequent Prime Minister
Allan Louisy
Labour Party

General elections were held in Saint Lucia on 2 July 1979. The result was a victory for the Saint Lucia Labour Party, which won twelve of the seventeen seats. Voter turnout was 68.0%.

== Results ==
Party	Votes	%	Seats	+/–
Saint Lucia Labour Party	25,294	56.21	12	+5
United Workers Party	19,706	43.79	5	–5
Total	45,000	100.00	17	0
Valid votes	45,000	97.42		
Invalid/blank votes	1,191	2.58		
Total votes	46,191	100.00		
Registered voters/turnout	67,917	68.01		
Source: Nohlen
