= 6 April 1987 Saint Lucian general election =

General elections in Saint Lucia held on 6 April 1987

- 6 April 1987

All 17 seats in the House of Assembly 9 seats needed for a majority
- Turnout: 60.74% (▼5.06pp)
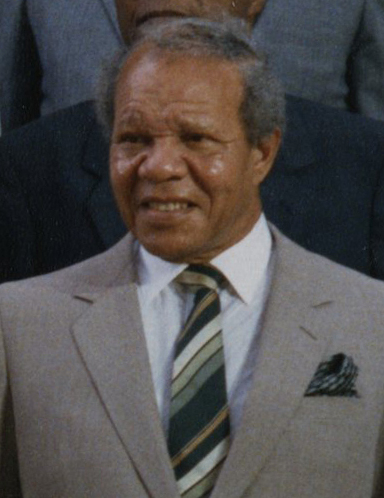

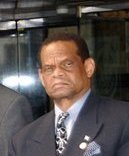
	First party	Second party
Leader	John Compton	Julian Hunte
Party	UWP	Labour Party
Last election	56.18%, 14 seats	16.74%, 2 seats
Seats won	9	8
Seat change	▼5	▲6
Popular vote	27,252	18,889
Percentage	52.46%	38.27%
Swing	▼3.72pp	▲21.53pp
Prime Minister before election
John Compton
UWP
Subsequent Prime Minister
John Compton
UWP

General elections were held in Saint Lucia on 6 April 1987. The result was a victory for the United Workers Party, which won nine of the seventeen seats. Voter turnout was 60.7%.

As the UWP had only won a single seat majority, Prime Minister John Compton called early elections, which were held on 30 April in order to try to increase the party's majority. However, the distribution of seats remained the same, despite the UWP obtaining an increased 53.2% of the vote.

== Results ==
Party	Votes	%	Seats	+/–
United Workers Party	25,892	52.46	9	–5
Saint Lucia Labour Party	18,889	38.27	8	+6
Progressive Labour Party	4,572	9.26	0	–1
Total	49,353	100.00	17	0
Valid votes	49,353	97.71		
Invalid/blank votes	1,158	2.29		
Total votes	50,511	100.00		
Registered voters/turnout	83,153	60.74		
Source: Nohlen
