= 1957 Saint Lucian general election =

General election results for Saint Lucia in 1957

Results by constituency

General elections were held in Saint Lucia on 18 September 1957. The result was a victory for the Saint Lucia Labour Party, which won seven of the eight seats. Voter turnout was 56.8%.

== Results ==
Party	Votes	%	Seats	+/–
Saint Lucia Labour Party	14,345	66.47	7	+2
People's Progressive Party	6,134	28.42	1	0
Independents	1,103	5.11	0	–2
Total	21,582	100.00	8	0
Valid votes	21,582	97.02		
Invalid/blank votes	662	2.98		
Total votes	22,244	100.00		
Registered voters/turnout	39,147	56.82		
Source: Nohlen
