= 30 April 1987 Saint Lucian general election =

- 30 April 1987

All 17 seats in the House of Assembly 9 seats needed for a majority
- Turnout: 64.72% (▲3.98pp)
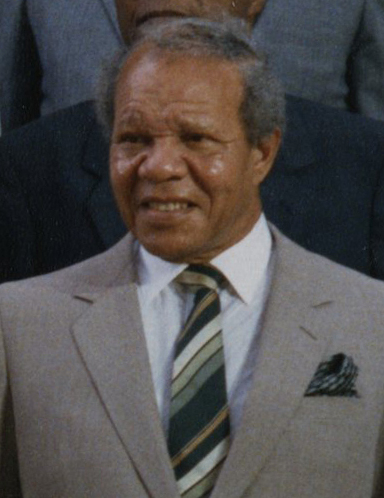

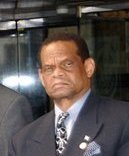
	First party	Second party
Leader	John Compton	Julian Hunte
Party	UWP	Labour Party
Last election	52.46%, 9 seats	38.27%, 8 seats
Seats won	9	8
Seat change	Steady	Steady
Popular vote	28,046	21,515
Percentage	53.18%	40.80%
Swing	▲0.72pp	▲2.53pp
- Results by constituency
Prime Minister before election
John Compton
UWP
Subsequent Prime Minister
John Compton
UWP

Snap general elections were held in Saint Lucia on 30 April 1987, after elections earlier in the month had resulted in only a single-seat majority for the United Workers Party (UWP). Despite the former increasing their share of the vote from 52.5% to 53.2%, the number of seats held by the UWP and the Saint Lucia Labour Party remained the same. Voter turnout was 64.7%.

== Results ==
Party	Votes	%	Seats	+/–
United Workers Party	28,046	53.18	9	0
Saint Lucia Labour Party	21,515	40.80	8	0
Progressive Labour Party	3,176	6.02	0	0
Total	52,737	100.00	17	0
Valid votes	52,737	97.87		
Invalid/blank votes	1,146	2.13		
Total votes	53,883	100.00		
Registered voters/turnout	83,257	64.72		
Source: Nohlen
