= List of prime ministers of Saint Lucia =

Prime Minister of Saint Lucia
- Pwèmyé Minis Sent Lisi

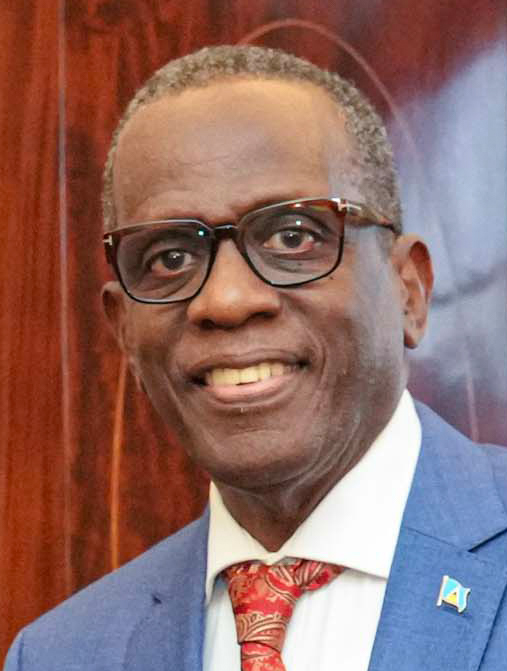
- Incumbent; Philip J. Pierre since 28 July 2021
- Style: The Honourable
- Residence: Prime Minister’s Official Residence at Vigie, Castries
- Appointer: Governor-General
- Term length: Five years renewable
- Formation: 22 February 1979
- First holder: John Compton
- Deputy: Deputy Prime Minister of Saint Lucia
- Salary: EC$136,849 / US$50,685 annually
- Website: Government website

This is a list of prime ministers of Saint Lucia. The prime minister is the head of government of Saint Lucia. The prime minister heads the executive branch and chairs the cabinet.

== Constitutional basis ==
Section 60 of the Constitution of Saint Lucia provides that the prime minister must be a member of the House of Assembly and that the governor-general shall "appoint a member of the House who appears to him likely to command the support of the majority of the members of the House", or if the House is dissolved, "a person who was a member of the House immediately before the dissolution". The same section requires the governor-general to remove the prime minister from office if a resolution of no confidence is passed and the prime minister does not resign within three days. The office of prime minister also becomes vacant if the holder ceases to be a member of the House of Assembly.

== List of officeholders ==
Political parties

Saint Lucia Labour Party (SLP)
United Workers Party (Saint Lucia) (UWP)
Progressive Labour Party (PLP)

Status

Denotes acting prime minister

Symbols

^{†} Died in office

=== Chief ministers of Saint Lucia (1960–1967) ===
| No. | Portrait | Name (Birth–Death) | Election | Term of office | | | Political party | Ref. |
| No. | Portrait | Name (Birth–Death) | Election | Took office | Left office | Time in office | Political party | Ref. |
|---|---|---|---|---|---|---|---|---|
| 1 | | George Charles (1916–2004) | 1961 | 1 January 1960 | April 1964 | 4 years, 3 months | SLP | |
| 2 | | John Compton (1925–2007) | 1964 | April 1964 | 1 March 1967 | 2 years, 11 months | UWP | |

=== Premier of Saint Lucia (1967–1979) ===
| No. | Portrait | Name (Birth–Death) | Election | Term of office | | | Political party | Ref. |
| No. | Portrait | Name (Birth–Death) | Election | Took office | Left office | Time in office | Political party | Ref. |
|---|---|---|---|---|---|---|---|---|
| 1 | | John Compton (1925–2007) | 1969; 1974 | 1 March 1967 | 22 February 1979 | 11 years, 358 days | UWP | |

=== Prime ministers of Saint Lucia (1979–present) ===
| No. | Portrait | Name (Birth–Death) | Election | Term of office | | | Political party | Ref. |
| No. | Portrait | Name (Birth–Death) | Election | Took office | Left office | Time in office | Political party | Ref. |
|---|---|---|---|---|---|---|---|---|
| 1 | | John Compton (1925–2007) | — | 22 February 1979 | 2 July 1979 | 130 days | UWP | |
| 2 | | Allan Louisy (1916–2011) | 1979 | 2 July 1979 | 4 May 1981 | 1 year, 306 days | SLP | |
| 3 | | Winston Cenac (1925–2004) | — | 4 May 1981 | 17 January 1982 | 258 days | SLP | |
| — | | Michael Pilgrim (born 1947) | — | 17 January 1982 | 3 May 1982 | 106 days | PLP | |
| (1) | | John Compton (1925–2007) | 1982; 1987 (6 Apr.); 1987 (30 Apr.); 1992 | 3 May 1982 | 2 April 1996 | 13 years, 335 days | UWP | |
| 4 | | Vaughan Lewis (born 1940) | — | 2 April 1996 | 24 May 1997 | 1 year, 52 days | UWP | |
| 5 | | Kenny Anthony (born 1951) | 1997; 2001 | 24 May 1997 | 11 December 2006 | 9 years, 201 days | SLP | |
| (1) | | Sir John Compton (1925–2007) | 2006 | 11 December 2006 | 7 September 2007^{[†]} | 270 days | UWP | |
| 6 | | Stephenson King (born 1958) | — | 7 September 2007 | 30 November 2011 | 4 years, 84 days | UWP | |
| (5) | | Kenny Anthony (born 1951) | 2011 | 30 November 2011 | 7 June 2016 | 4 years, 190 days | SLP | |
| 7 | | Allen Chastanet (born 1960) | 2016 | 7 June 2016 | 28 July 2021 | 5 years, 51 days | UWP | |
| 8 | | Philip J. Pierre (born 1954) | 2021; 2025 | 28 July 2021 | Incumbent | 5 years, 41 days | SLP | |

== Timeline ==
This is a graphical lifespan timeline of the prime ministers of Saint Lucia. They are listed in order of first assuming office.

The following chart lists prime ministers by lifespan (living prime ministers on the green line), with the years outside of their tenure in beige.

== See also ==
- Governor-General of Saint Lucia
- Deputy Prime Minister of Saint Lucia
