= Sulphur Springs, Saint Lucia =

Geothermal field in Soufrière District, Saint Lucia

Sulphur Springs
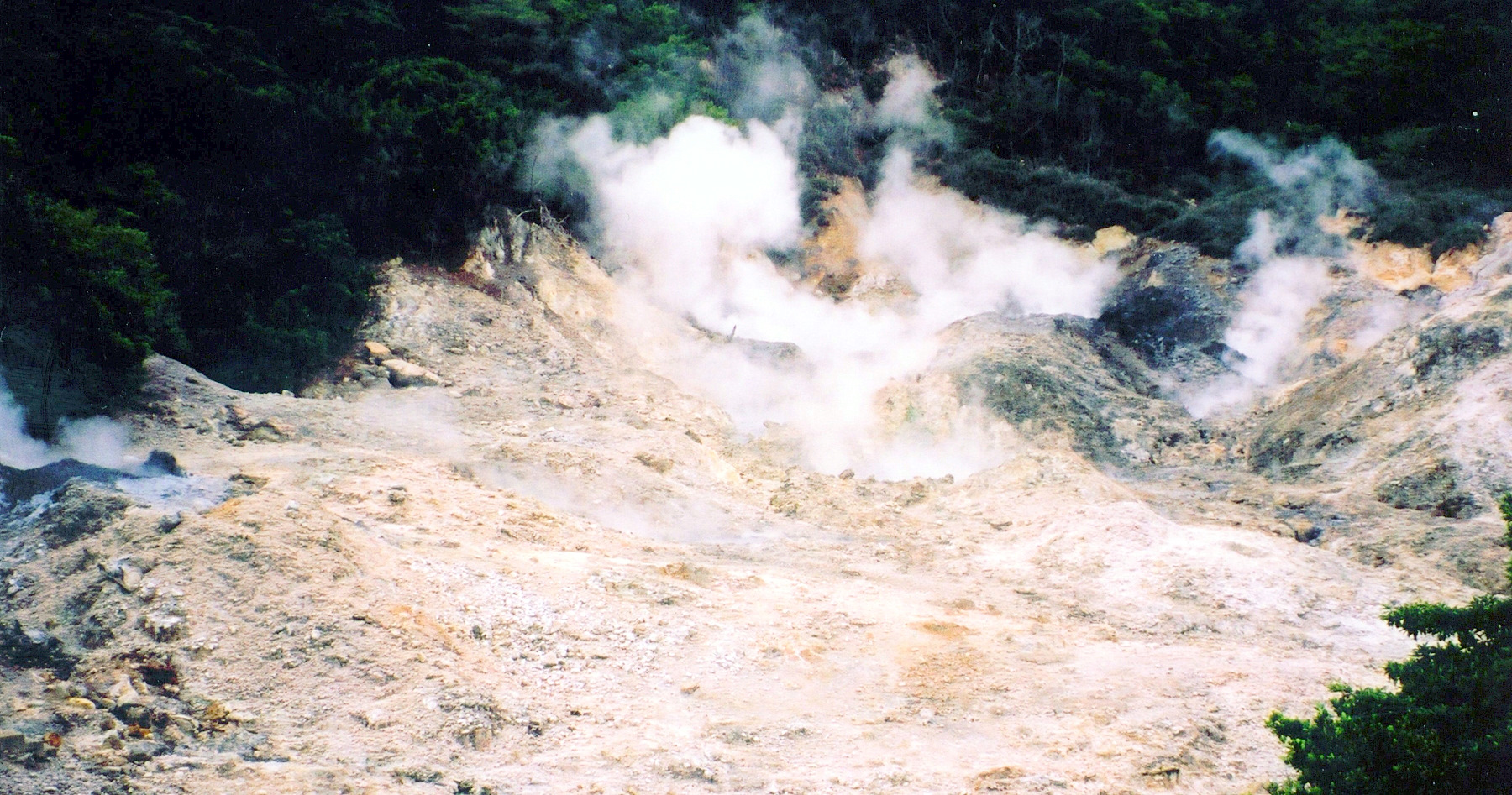
- Sulphur Springs

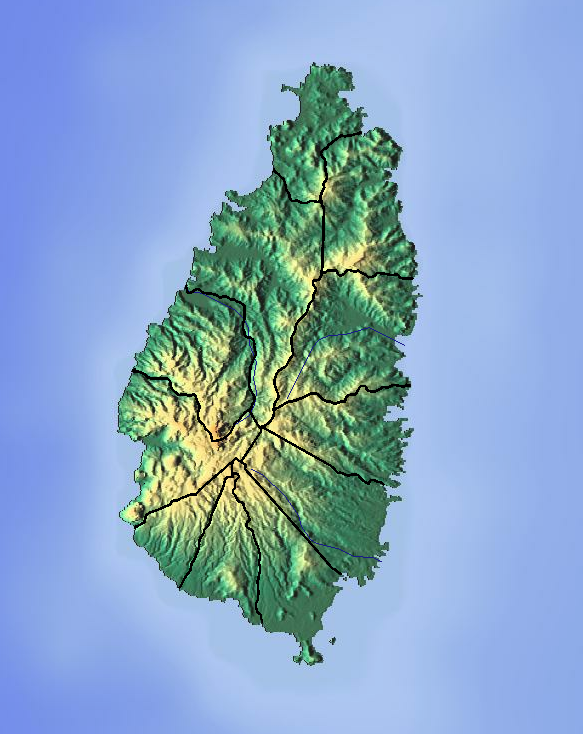
- Location within Saint Lucia
- Location: Soufrière District, Saint Lucia
- Coordinates: 13°50′17″N 61°02′46″W
- Elevation: 241 m (791 ft)

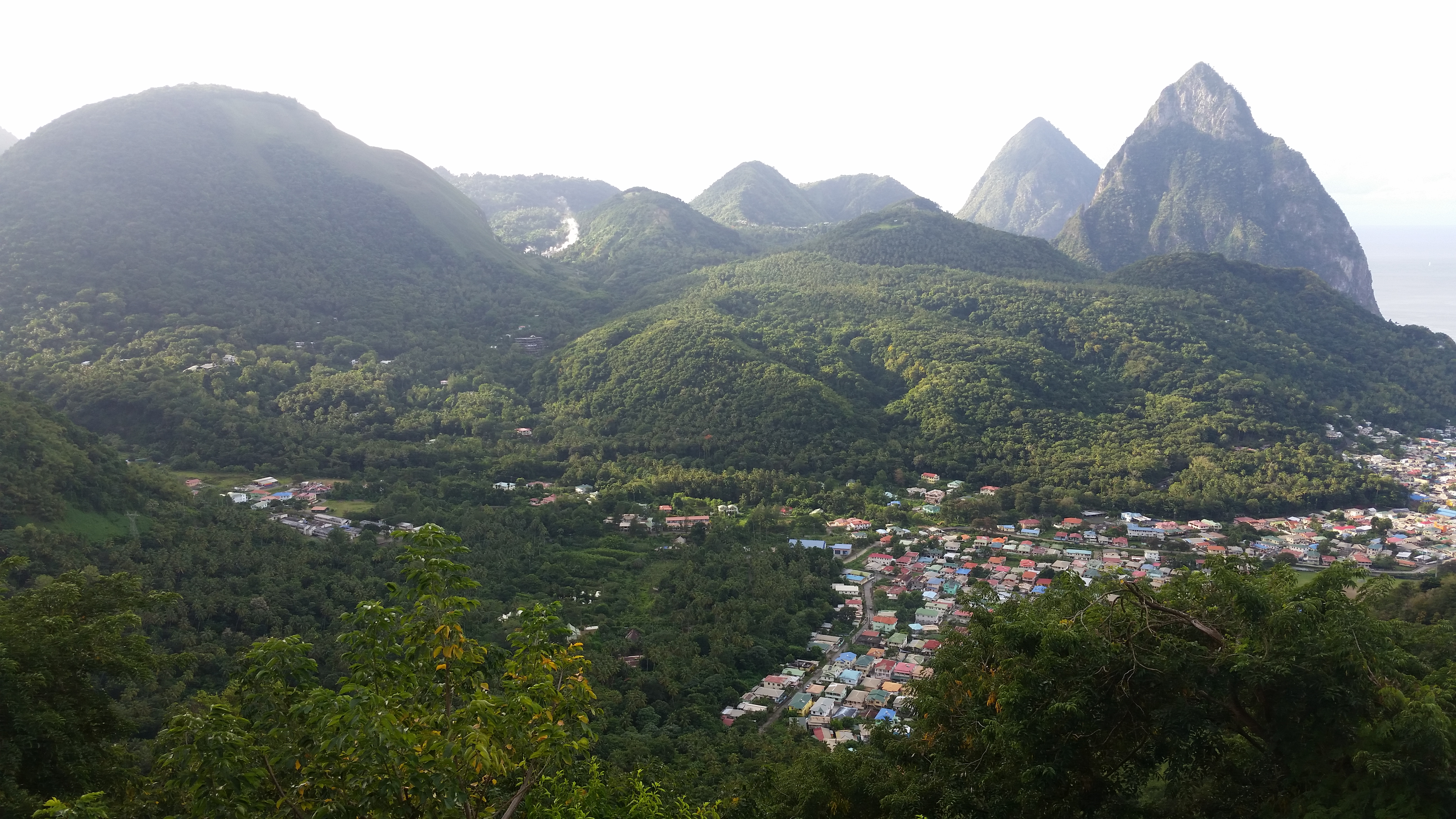
Vapors from Sulphur Springs can be seen in the left center background, with the Pitons in the right background, and Soufriere in the right foreground.

Sulphur Springs is a geothermal field on the island of Saint Lucia. It is located to the southwest in the district of Soufriere, a name given by the French meaning 'sulphur mine', because of the proximity of the town to the site. It is the most popular tourist destination in Saint Lucia, with approximately 200,000 annual patrons to the park, and is known as 'the world's only drive-in volcano'.

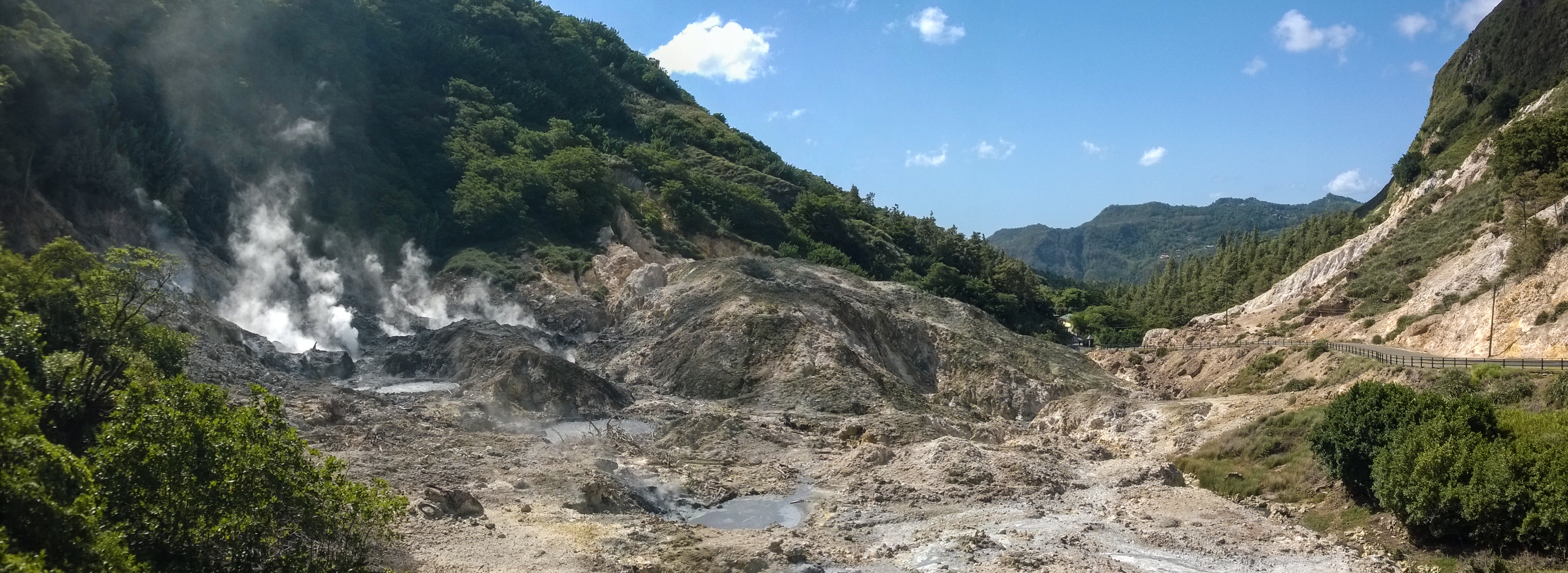
Sulphur Springs geothermal area near Soufrière, Saint Lucia

== Mine ==
A sulphur mine was operated by Bennett and Wood from 1836 until 1840. Maximum production occurred in 1836, with 540 tons of sulphur exported.

== Activity ==
The Sulphur Springs emerged from a weak spot in the crust of the enormous collapsed crater creating an upheaval of lava approximately 300,000 years ago. The most recent volcanic eruption from the Sulphur Springs, recorded as a minor explosion, occurred in 1766.

== Springs ==
The water located at the center of the springs boils at roughly 212 Fahrenheit (100 Celsius) creating large plumes of steam. The water coming out of the spring is blackened by a chemical reaction between the high content of sulfur and iron. The spring water also contains large deposits of copper, iron oxide, alkaline lead, calcium oxide, and carbon. Sulphur still billows from the cracks in the caldera. There are also active boiling mud pits around the area.

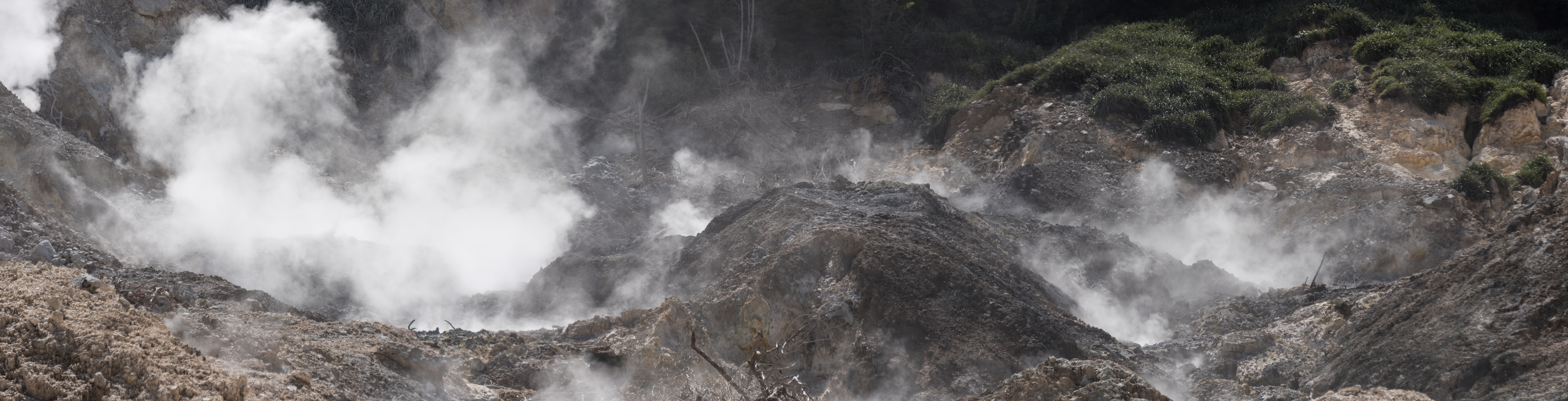
Blackened soil, hot pools and fumaroles

== Tourist attraction ==
The Sulphur Springs are a popular tourist destination in St Lucia due to their ability for tourists to literally drive up to the edge of the springs. Up until the mid-1990s, tourists were able to walk right up to the end of the tar-colored pits. Following an accident where a local tour guide named Gabriel fell through the crust into a pit and received second degree burns from just above his waist, the formation of what is now known as Gabriel's Hole has restricted viewing to a platform a few hundred feet away.

A couple of hundred yards downstream from the springs, the water temperature is still hot (around 110 Fahrenheit or 45 Celsius), but cool enough for tourists to enter and give themselves a mud bath. These mud baths are believed by some to have medicinal properties and are used by some tourists and locals for said reasons.
