= 2011 Saint Lucian general election =

← 2006	28 November 2011	2016 →

All 17 seats in the House of Assembly 9 seats needed for a majority
- Turnout: 56.14% (▼2.32pp)
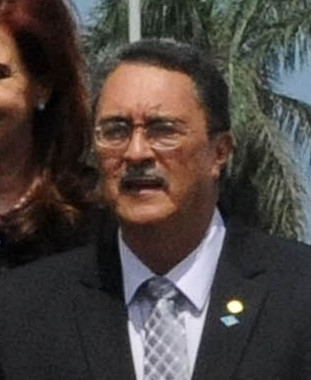

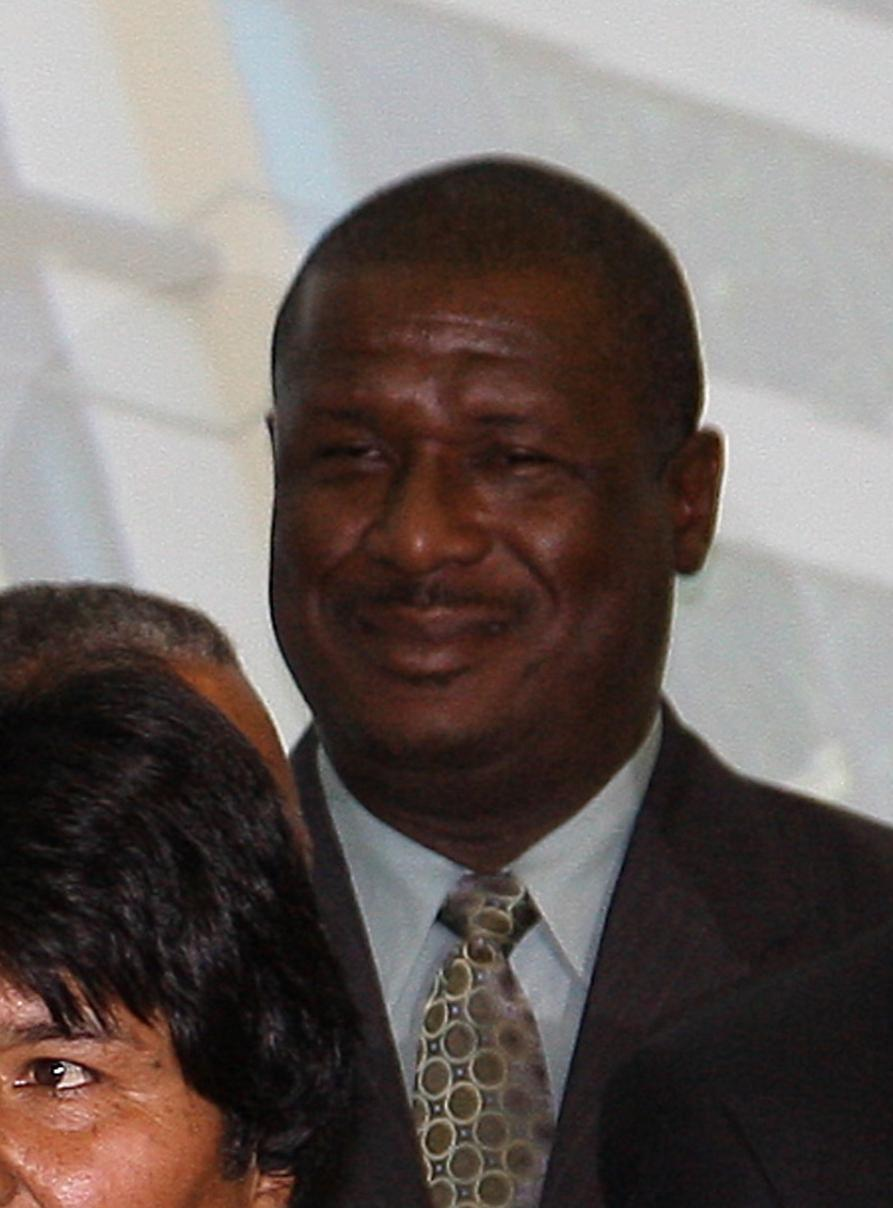
	First party	Second party
Leader	Kenny Anthony	Stephenson King
Party	Labour Party	UWP
Last election	48.32%, 6 seats	51.34%, 11 seats
Seats won	11	6
Seat change	▲5	▼5
Popular vote	42,620	39,336
Percentage	50.99%	46.96%
Swing	▲2.67pp	▼4.38pp
- Results by constituency
Prime Minister before election
Stephenson King
UWP
Subsequent Prime Minister
Kenny Anthony
Labour Party

General elections were held in Saint Lucia on 28 November 2011. The result was a victory for the opposition Saint Lucia Labour Party, which won eleven of the seventeen seats. On 30 November 2011 Labour Party leader Kenny Anthony was sworn in as Prime Minister.

== Electoral System ==
The 17 elected members of the House of Assembly were elected by first-past-the-post voting in single member constituencies. Following the elections, a Speaker was elected, who may be from outside the House.

== Results ==
Party	Votes	%	Seats	+/–
Saint Lucia Labour Party	42,456	50.99	11	+5
United Workers Party	39,100	46.96	6	–5
National Democratic Movement	200	0.24	0	New
Lucian People's Movement	143	0.17	0	New
Lucian Greens	23	0.03	0	New
Independents	1,338	1.61	0	0
Total	83,260	100.00	17	0
Valid votes	83,260	97.91		
Invalid/blank votes	1,775	2.09		
Total votes	85,035	100.00		
Registered voters/turnout	151,466	56.14		
Source: Caribbean Elections
