= 1964 Saint Lucian general election =

General election results in Saint Lucia for 1964

- 25 June 1964

All 10 seats in the House of Assembly 6 seats needed for a majority
- Turnout: 51.82%
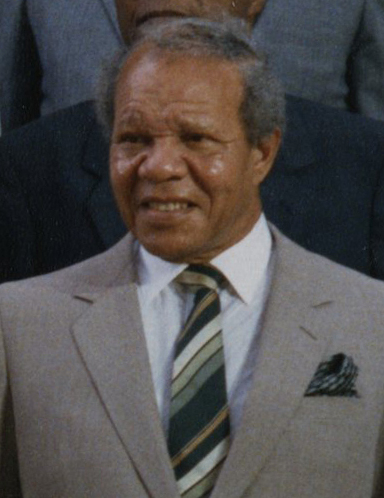

	First party	Second party
Leader	John Compton	George Charles
Party	UWP	Labour Party
Last election	32.25%, 1 seat	61.45%, 9 seats
Seats won	6	2
Seat change	▲5	▼7
Popular vote	9,615	5,614
Percentage	51.51%	30.08%
Swing	▲19.25pp	▼31.33pp
- Results by constituency
Chief Minister before election
George Charles
Labour Party
Elected Chief Minister
John Compton
UWP

General elections were held in Saint Lucia on 25 June 1964. The result was a victory for the United Workers Party, which won six of the ten seats. Voter turnout was 51.8%.

== Results ==
Party	Votes	%	Seats	+/–
United Workers Party	9,615	51.51	6	+5
Saint Lucia Labour Party	5,614	30.08	2	–7
Independents	3,436	18.41	2	+2
Total	18,665	100.00	10	0
Valid votes	18,665	95.36		
Invalid/blank votes	909	4.64		
Total votes	19,574	100.00		
Registered voters/turnout	37,774	51.82		
Source: Caribbean Elections
