= 1954 Saint Lucian general election =

General election held in Saint Lucia

Results by constituency

General elections were held in Saint Lucia on 23 September 1954. The result was a victory for the Saint Lucia Labour Party, which won five of the eight seats. Voter turnout was 49.4%.

== Results ==
Party	Votes	%	Seats	+/–
Saint Lucia Labour Party	7,462	47.44	5	0
People's Progressive Party	2,799	17.79	1	0
Independents	5,470	34.77	2	0
Total	15,731	100.00	8	0
Valid votes	15,731	92.50		
Invalid/blank votes	1,275	7.50		
Total votes	17,006	100.00		
Registered voters/turnout	34,452	49.36		
Source: Nohlen, PDBA
