= 1951 Saint Lucian general election =

General elections in Saint Lucia held on 12 October 1951

Results by constituency

General elections were held in Saint Lucia on 12 October 1951. The result was a victory for the Saint Lucia Labour Party, which won five of the eight seats. Voter turnout was 59.1%.

== Results ==
Party	Votes	%	Seats
Saint Lucia Labour Party	7,648	49.58	5
People's Progressive Party	4,201	27.23	1
Independents	3,577	23.19	2
Total	15,426	100.00	8
Valid votes	15,426	91.90	
Invalid/blank votes	1,360	8.10	
Total votes	16,786	100.00	
Registered voters/turnout	28,398	59.11	
Source: Nohlen, PDBA
