= Allan Louisy =

Prime Minister of Saint Lucia from 1979 to 1981

The Honourable Sir Allan Louisy KCMG PC

2nd Prime Minister of St Lucia
- In office 2 July 1979 – 4 May 1981
- Monarch: Elizabeth II
- Governor-General: Allen Montgomery Lewis
- Deputy: George Odlum
- Preceded by: John Compton
- Succeeded by: Winston Cenac

Personal details
- Born: Allan Fitzgerald Laurent Louisy; 5 September 1916 Laborie, St Lucia, British Windward Islands
- Died: 2 March 2011 (aged 94) Laborie, St Lucia
- Party: Saint Lucia Labour Party

Sir Allan Fitzgerald Laurent Louisy KCMG PC (5 September 1916 – 2 March 2011) was the second prime minister of independent St Lucia, following Sir John Compton in office. He was born in Laborie on 5 September 1916 and served as a judge before being elected to parliament in 1974.

Louisy was Leader of the Opposition from 1974 to 1979. In the 1979 general elections, Louisy became prime minister following the Saint Lucia Labour Party (SLP) victory. He also held the additional portfolio of Minister of Finance.

He was succeeded as prime minister by Winston Cenac. After retiring from politics, Sir Allan Louisy continued working as a consultant and as a lawyer. He was also actively involved in the trade union movement.

In his later years, he retired to his home in Saphyr Estate, and continued to spend his time volunteering in Laborie. He was knighted on 31 March 2005, recognizing all his accomplishments and benevolence during his lifetime.

He died on 2 March 2011 at home, surrounded by family.

== See also ==
- Saint Lucia Labour Party
- Politics of Saint Lucia
- List of prime ministers of Saint Lucia

Political offices
Preceded by John Compton	Prime Minister of Saint Lucia; 1979–1981	Succeeded by Winston Cenac
