= John Compton =

First Prime Minister of Saint Lucia

The Right Honourable Sir John Compton KCMG, PC
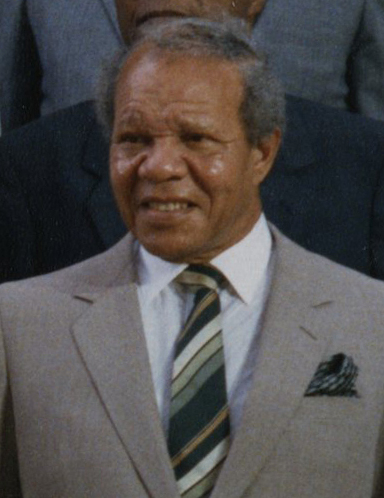
- Compton in 1986

1st Prime Minister of Saint Lucia
- In office 15 December 2006 – 7 September 2007
- Monarch: Elizabeth II
- Governor-General: Dame Pearlette Louisy
- Deputy: Lenard Montoute
- Preceded by: Kenny Anthony
- Succeeded by: Stephenson King
- In office 3 November 1982 – 2 April 1996
- Monarch: Elizabeth II
- Governors-General: Boswell Williams; Allen Montgomery Lewis; Vincent Floissac (acting); Stanislaus A. James
- Deputy: George Mallet
- Preceded by: Michael Pilgrim
- Succeeded by: Vaughan Lewis
- In office 22 February – 2 July 1979
- Monarch: Elizabeth II
- Governor-General: Allen Montgomery Lewis
- Deputy: George Mallet
- Preceded by: Himself (as Premier)
- Succeeded by: Allan Louisy

Premier of Saint Lucia
- In office 1 March 1967 – 22 February 1979
- Monarch: Elizabeth II
- Governor: Frederick Clarke; Ira Marcus Simmons; Allen Montgomery Lewis
- Deputy: Hunter J. Francois
- Preceded by: Himself (as Chief Minister)
- Succeeded by: Himself (as Prime Minister)

Chief Minister of Saint Lucia
- In office April 1964 – 1 March 1967
- Monarch: Elizabeth II
- Administrator: Gerald Jackson Bryan
- Preceded by: George Charles
- Succeeded by: Himself (as Premier)

Personal details
- Born: 29 April 1925 Canouan, Saint Vincent and the Grenadines
- Died: 7 September 2007 (aged 82) Tapion Hospital, Castries, Saint Lucia
- Cause of death: Complications from stroke
- Party: United Workers Party (from 1964)
- Other political affiliations: National Labour Movement (1961-1964); Saint Lucia Labour Party (1956-1961); Independent (before 1956)
- Spouse: Lady Barbara Janice Compton (née Clarke)

Sir John George Melvin Compton, KCMG PC (29 April 1925 – 7 September 2007) was a Saint Lucian politician who became the first prime minister upon independence in February 1979. Having led Saint Lucia under British rule from 1964 to 1979, Compton served as prime minister three times: briefly in 1979, again from 1982 to 1996, and from 2006 until his death in 2007. He cofounded the conservative United Workers Party (UWP) in 1964; he led the party until 1996, again from 1998 to 2000, and again from 2005 to 2007.

== Early life and education ==
Compton was born on 29 April 1925 in Canouan, St. Vincent and the Grenadines. In September 1939, he was taken to Saint Lucia. While studying law and economics, Compton attended the University College of Wales from 1948 to 1949 and the London School of Economics from 1949 to 1951; he was called to the Bar on 7 August 1951.

== Political career ==
=== Beginnings ===
Compton entered politics in 1954, successfully running for the Micoud/Dennery seat on the Saint Lucia Executive Council as an independent. He became the Council Member for Social Affairs in 1955, and served in this position until the Committee System was replaced by the Ministerial System in 1956. That same year, he joined the Saint Lucia Labour Party (SLP). He participated in a sugar workers' strike in 1957, and was fined for obstructing roads. Re-elected in 1957, Compton became Minister for Trade and Production in 1958; he was also appointed deputy leader of the SLP under George Charles. In 1960 he was reappointed Minister of Trade and Industry when Charles became the first Chief Minister. Although Compton was re-elected in 1961, he chose not to join the Executive Council. Objecting to the SLP's new ministers, he left the SLP instead and formed a new party, the National Labour Movement.

In 1964, Compton merged the National Labour Movement with another opposition party, the People's Progressive Party, to form the United Workers' Party (UWP). This new party won the 1964 general election, making Compton the new Chief Minister.

=== Administration under British rule, 1964–1979 ===
In office, Compton worked for Saint Lucia's independence from British rule. When Saint Lucia became an Associated State of the United Kingdom on 1 March 1967, a move that placed the Saint Lucian government fully in charge of the island's internal affairs, Compton became St. Lucia's first and only Premier. At the conference from April to May 1966 that led to this change, Compton sharply criticized the British government for excluding certain issues, and accused it of favoring "second-class citizenship for people of another color". In 1968, he married Barbara Janice Clarke, with whom he would have five children.

Following the UWP's victory in the 1974 election, Compton pushed for negotiations leading to independence, which was achieved on 22 February 1979; Compton became the newly independent nation's first Prime Minister.

=== As Prime Minister and in opposition, 1979–1996 ===
A few months after independence in 1979, the UWP was defeated in an election by the SLP, and Compton became Leader of the Opposition. The SLP government collapsed in October 1982, and the UWP won the subsequent election in November 1982; Compton became Prime Minister again. He also held the additional portfolio of Minister of Finance, Planning and Development. He remained in office until he retired in 1996; he was replaced by his chosen successor, Vaughan Lewis. Compton became a legal consultant.

In office, Compton's policies were conservative, pro-Western and anti-communist. He also worked for increased regional integration: upon leaving office in 1996, he voiced disappointment that the region's population remained a "divided people scattered over the Caribbean Sea".

=== After 1996 ===
He was re-elected as the leader of UWP in 1998, however, he was replaced as leader by Morella Joseph in 2000. Compton then joined George Odlum to form the National Alliance, which did not have much success in the 2001 elections.

On 13 March 2005, the UWP elected Compton, then 80 years old, as its leader again at a party convention in Soufriere; he received 260 votes against 135 for Vaughan Lewis.

During the 2006 general election season, Compton parried media concerns about his age and campaigned actively, commenting that it was different from preparing to run in the Olympics. Despite opinion polls forecasting another term for the incumbent St Lucia Labour Party, Compton led the UWP to victory on 11 December 2006. He was elected to the seat from Micoud North over SLP candidate Silas Wilson. He was sworn in as Prime Minister on 15 December. His cabinet was sworn in on 19 December, with Compton as Prime Minister and Minister of Finance.

== Illness and death ==
On 1 May 2007, Compton was hospitalized in New York City after suffering a series of strokes. He fell ill while visiting a doctor for a normal checkup.

On 16 May, Sports Minister Leonard Montoute, who was also the deputy leader of the United Workers Party, announced that Compton was unable to stand or walk on his own, and that the cabinet was preparing to select a successor.

Compton returned to Saint Lucia on 19 May. He temporarily resumed power in early June to oversee a cabinet reshuffle, in which he remained Prime Minister but gave up the finance portfolio to Acting Prime Minister Stephenson King. King said on 8 June that Compton's condition was improving. On 11 July, he attended a meeting with several cabinet ministers, the first time he had done so since the strokes.

In late July, it was announced that Compton would resign by the end of 2007. On 26 August, Compton was admitted to the Tapion Hospital in Castries because he was having trouble breathing due to pneumonia. While there, it was learned that he had suffered another stroke while recovering from the previous strokes. On 1 September, he was flown to Martinique for treatment of his pneumonia. While there, his condition worsened and he was placed on a ventilator. On 4 September, doctors decided that his condition was hopeless; on 5 September, he was returned to the Tapion Hospital in Saint Lucia to die. He died there on 7 September 2007. Acting Prime Minister King declared two weeks of mourning, beginning on 8 September.

A state funeral was held for Compton in Castries, at the Minor Basilica of the Immaculate Conception, on 18 September. Despite Compton's Anglican faith, the local Catholic church was used due to the large number of mourners and at the request of Sir John. The funeral services held in Micoud on 16 September and at the Minor Basilica on 18 September were in keeping with the requests of Sir John for his funeral service, including the hymns which were specifically requested by him. He was cremated on 19 September and his ashes spread in the Troumasse River at his estate in Mahaut upon his request.

The John Compton Dam in central Saint Lucia was renamed in his honor.

== Personal life and family ==
In 1967 he married Janice Barbara Clarke the daughter of Saint Lucia's first Saint Lucian-born Governor, Sir Frederick Clarke. Out of this union, five children were born.

Compton's daughter Jeannine Compton-Antoine, a marine biologist, is director of the Saint Lucia National Trust, having previously followed her fathers footsteps into politics. In a by-election held on 26 November 2007, she won John Compton's constituency of Micoud North. Daughter Fiona Compton is a Caribbean historian, artist and photographer who graduated from London College of Printing in 2005 with a BA in photography. She has worked for different UK publishing houses. Daughter Nina Compton is a James Beard Award-winning chef in the U.S., and television personality. In 2013, she participated in season 11 of the American reality cooking show Top Chef, where she was the runner-up and was voted the "fan favorite".

== See also ==
- Prime Minister of Saint Lucia
- United Workers Party
- John Compton Dam

Preceded by George Charles	Chief Minister of Saint Lucia; 1964–1967	Succeeded by --
Preceded by --	Premier of Saint Lucia; 1967–1979	Succeeded by --
Preceded by –	Prime Minister of Saint Lucia; 1979	Succeeded by Allan Louisy
Preceded by Michael Pilgrim	Prime Minister of Saint Lucia; 1982–1996	Succeeded by Vaughan Lewis
Preceded by Kenny Anthony	Prime Minister of Saint Lucia; 2006–2007	Succeeded by Stephenson King
