= Saint Lucia Labour Party =

Political party in Saint Lucia

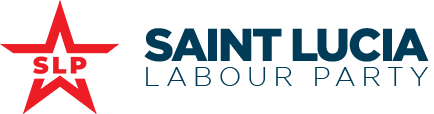
- Abbreviation: SLP
- Leader: Philip J. Pierre
- Founded: October 1950; 76 years ago
- Headquarters: Jeremie Street; Castries
- Ideology: Social democracy
- Political position: Centre-left
- Regional affiliation: COPPPAL; São Paulo Forum
- International affiliation: Progressive Alliance
- House of Assembly: 14 / 17
- Senate: 6 / 11

Website
- voteslp.lc

The Saint Lucia Labour Party (SLP) is a social democratic political party in Saint Lucia. It currently holds 14 out of 17 seats in the House of Assembly.

== History ==
The party was established in 1949, backed by the Saint Lucia Workers Cooperative Union. In the first elections held under universal suffrage in 1951, and led by party founder George Charles, the party won five of the eight seats. It retained all five seats in the 1954 elections, and increased their majority to seven of the eight seats in 1957 and nine of the ten seats in 1961.

In 1964, the party lost an election for the first time, with the United Workers Party, born out of a schism from within the Labour Party led by John Compton and eventual merger of the breakaway faction with the People's Progressive Party, winning six of the ten seats, with the Labour Party reduced to two. It gained a seat in the 1969 elections, and increased their representation to seven seats in 1974, although the UWP remained in power as the total number of seats rose to 17.

The Labour Party returned to power after winning the 1979 elections (12/17), led by Allan Louisy, replaced as prime minister during the term by Winston Cenac, himself replaced by Michael Pilgrim. The 1979 elections were the first elections held following independence from the United Kingdom, declared on 22 February 1979.

It lost the 1982 elections to Compton's UWP when they were reduced to just two seats, challenged on their left by a breakaway faction, George Odlum's Progressive Labour Party taking 1 seat. It remained in opposition following the two elections of April 1987, increasing its presence to 8 seats in both contests, and in 1992 (6/17).

Led by Dr. Kenny Anthony, former cabinet minister in the 1979–1982 government, it won the 1997 elections, taking 16 of the 17 seats. It remained in power after the 2001 elections (14/17).

It lost the 2006 elections to the UWP, who had called back John Compton as leader a year before - he had retired in 1996. Kenny Anthony remained leader of the party throughout its time as loyal opposition. The Labour Party won the 2011 Saint Lucian general election (28 November 2011), winning in 11 out of a 17-seats contest and defeating UWP leader Stephenson King who had lost to John Compton as Prime Minister (d. 2007, in office).

The Labour Party lost the 2016 elections to the UWP by 11 seats to 6, and Kenny Anthony resigned as party leader. Former Deputy PM Philip J. Pierre was confirmed as party leader on 18 June 2016. The party then formed government in the 2021 and 2025 general elections, under Pierre.

== Saint Lucia Labour Party Prime Ministers ==
No.	Portrait	Name (Birth–Death)	Election	Term of office			Ref.
No.	Portrait	Name (Birth–Death)	Election	Took office	Left office	Time in office	Ref.
1		Allan Louisy (1916–2011)	1979	2 July 1979	4 May 1981	1 year, 306 days	
2		Winston Cenac (1925–2004)	—	4 May 1981	17 January 1982	258 days	
3		Kenny Anthony (born 1951)	1997; 2001	24 May 1997	11 December 2006	9 years, 201 days	
3		Kenny Anthony (born 1951)	2011	30 November 2011	7 June 2016	4 years, 190 days	
4		Philip J. Pierre (born 1954)	2021; 2025	28 July 2021	Incumbent	5 years, 78 days	

== Election results ==
=== House of Assembly elections ===
Election	Party leader	Votes	%	Seats	+/–	Position	Result
1951	George Charles	7,648	49.6%	5 / 8	▲5	▲1st	Majority government
1954	George Charles	7,462	47.4%	5 / 8	Steady	1st	Majority government
1957	George Charles	14,345	66.5%	7 / 8	▲2	1st	Supermajority government
1961	George Charles	11,898	61.5%	9 / 10	▲2	1st	Supermajority government
1964	George Charles	5,617	30.1%	2 / 10	▼7	▼2nd	Opposition
1969	Kenneth Foster	8,271	36.1%	3 / 10	▲1	2nd	Opposition
1974	Allan Louisy	14,554	44.5%	7 / 17	▲4	2nd	Opposition
1979	Allan Louisy	25,294	56.2%	12 / 17	▲5	▲1st	Supermajority government
1982	Peter Josie	8,122	16.7%	2 / 17	▼10	▼2nd	Opposition
1987 (6 Apr)	Julian Hunte	18,889	38.3%	8 / 17	▲6	2nd	Opposition
1987 (30 Apr)	Julian Hunte	21,515	40.8%	8 / 17	Steady	2nd	Opposition
1992	Julian Hunte	25,565	43.2%	6 / 17	▼2	2nd	Opposition
1997	Kenny Anthony	44,153	61.3%	16 / 17	▲8	▲1st	Supermajority government
2001	Kenny Anthony	34,053	56.0%	14 / 17	▼2	1st	Supermajority government
2006	Kenny Anthony	36,604	48.3%	6 / 17	▼8	▼2nd	Opposition
2011	Kenny Anthony	42,456	50.99%	11 / 17	▲5	▲1st	Majority government
2016	Kenny Anthony	37,148	44.07%	6 / 17	▼5	▼2nd	Opposition
2021	Philip J. Pierre	43,798	50.14%	13 / 17	▲7	▲1st	Supermajority government
2025	Philip J. Pierre	48,855	55.77%	14 / 17	▲1	1st	Supermajority government
