= United Workers Party (Saint Lucia) =

- Leader: Allen Chastanet
- Founded: 1964
- Merger of: People's Progressive Party; National Labour Movement
- Ideology: Christian democracy Conservatism
- Political position: Centre-right
- Regional affiliation: Caribbean Democrat Union
- International affiliation: International Democracy Union
- House of Assembly: 1 / 17
- Senate: 3 / 11

Website
- uwpstlucia.com

The United Workers Party (UWP) is a political party in Saint Lucia currently led by former tourism minister Allen Chastanet, who defeated former prime minister Stephenson King in a July 28, 2013 leadership election. The party was led previously by Sir John Compton, the party's founder.

== History ==
The party was formed before the 1964 general elections by an alliance of the People's Progressive Party and the National Labour Movement, a splinter group founded by three members (John Compton, Vincent Monrose, and Maurice Mason) from the ruling Saint Lucia Labour Party. John Compton was the political leader and Henry Giraudy was the chairman of the party. They won the elections, taking six of the eight seats. They remained in power after winning elections in 1969 and 1974, before losing the 1979 elections to the Labour Party. They returned to power after winning 14 of the 17 seats in the 1982 elections, and remained in power after two elections in 1987 and one in 1992. The Labour Party won the 1997 and 2001 elections, but the UWP regained power in the 2006 elections. Since then neither party has managed to retain office for more than a single term. In 2011 the UWP lost the election to Labour, regained power in the 2016 elections, taking 11 of the 17 seats in the House, only to return to Opposition with just 2 seats after the 2021 election.

The United Workers Party is a member of the Caribbean Democrat Union, the regional organization of the global conservative International Democracy Union.

== Leaders ==
- John Compton (1964–1996)
- Vaughan Lewis (1996–1998)
- John Compton (1998-2000)
- Morella Joseph (2000-2001)
- Vaughan Lewis (2001-2005)
- John Compton (2005–2007)
- Stephenson King (2007–2013)
- Allen Chastanet (2013–present)

== United Workers Party Prime Ministers ==
Symbol

- † Died in office

| No. | Portrait | Name (Birth–Death) | Election | Term of office | | | Ref. |
| No. | Portrait | Name (Birth–Death) | Election | Took office | Left office | Time in office | Ref. |
|---|---|---|---|---|---|---|---|
| 1 | | John Compton (1925-2007) | — | 22 February 1979 | 2 July 1979 | 130 days | |
| 1 | | John Compton (1925-2007) | 1982; 1987 (6 Apr.); 1987 (30 Apr.); 1992 | 3 May 1982 | 2 April 1996 | 13 years, 335 days | |
| 1 | | John Compton (1925-2007) | 2006 | 11 December 2006 | 7 September 2007 † | 270 days | |
| 2 | | Vaughan Lewis (born 1940) | — | 2 April 1996 | 24 May 1997 | 1 year, 52 days | |
| 3 | | Stephenson King (born 1958) | — | 7 September 2007 | 30 November 2011 | 4 years, 84 days | |
| 4 | | Allen Chastanet (born 1960) | 2016 | 7 June 2016 | 28 July 2021 | 5 years, 51 days | |

== Election results ==
=== House of Assembly elections ===
| Election | Party leader | Votes | % | Seats | +/– | Position | Result |
|---|---|---|---|---|---|---|---|
| 1964 | John Compton | 9,615 | 51.5% | 6 / 10 | ▲6 | ▲1st | Majority government |
| 1969 | John Compton | 13,328 | 58.1% | 6 / 10 | Steady | 1st | Majority government |
| 1974 | John Compton | 17,300 | 53.4% | 10 / 17 | ▲4 | 1st | Majority government |
| 1979 | John Compton | 19,706 | 43.8% | 5 / 17 | ▼5 | ▼2nd | Opposition |
| 1982 | John Compton | 27,252 | 56.2% | 14 / 17 | ▲9 | ▲1st | Supermajority government |
| 1987 (6 Apr) | John Compton | 25,892 | 52.5% | 9 / 17 | ▼5 | 1st | Majority government |
| 1987 (30 Apr) | John Compton | 28,046 | 53.2% | 9 / 17 | Steady | 1st | Majority government |
| 1992 | John Compton | 33,562 | 56.7% | 11 / 17 | ▲2 | 1st | Majority government |
| 1997 | Vaughan Lewis | 26,325 | 36.6% | 1 / 17 | ▼10 | ▼2nd | Opposition |
| 2001 | Morella Joseph | 23,007 | 37.8% | 3 / 17 | ▲2 | 2nd | Opposition |
| 2006 | John Compton | 38,894 | 51.3% | 11 / 17 | ▲8 | ▲1st | Majority government |
| 2011 | Stephenson King | 39,100 | 46.96% | 6 / 17 | ▼5 | ▼2nd | Opposition |
| 2016 | Allen Chastanet | 46,183 | 54.79% | 11 / 17 | ▲5 | ▲1st | Majority government |
| 2021 | Allen Chastanet | 37,481 | 42.91% | 2 / 17 | ▼9 | ▼2nd | Opposition |
| 2025 | Allen Chastanet | 32,545 | 37.20% | 1 / 17 | ▼1 | 2nd | Opposition |
