= Saint Lucia =

Country in the West Indies in the eastern Caribbean Sea

- Flag Coat of arms
- Motto: "The Land, The People, The Light"
- Anthem: "Sons and Daughters of Saint Lucia" Royal anthem: "God Save the King"
- Location of Saint Lucia (circled in red) in the Caribbean

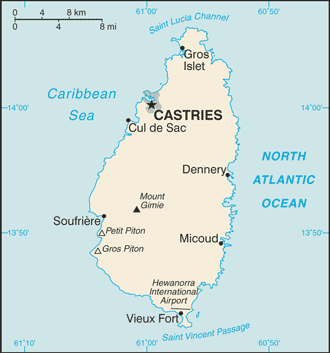
- Capital and largest city: Castries; 13°53′00″N 60°58′00″W
- Official languages: English
- Vernacular languages: Saint Lucian French Creole
- Ethnic groups (2020): 85.3% Afro-Caribbean; 10.9% Mixed; 2.2% Indian; 1.6% other/ unspecified
- Religion (2022): 77.4% Christianity; 14.4% no religion; 1.4% Rastafari; 2.7% other; 4.1% not stated
- Demonym: Saint Lucian
- Government: Unitary parliamentary constitutional monarchy
  - Monarch: Charles III
  - Governor-General: Felix Finisterre (acting)
  - Prime Minister: Philip J. Pierre
- Legislature: Parliament
  - Upper house: Senate
  - Lower house: House of Assembly

Independence
  - Associated State: 1 March 1967
  - Independence from the UK: 22 February 1979

Area
  - Total: 617 km^{2} (238 sq mi) (178th)
  - Water (%): 1.6

Population
  - 2023 estimate: 184,100 (177th)
  - 2022 census: 172,948
  - Density: 298/km^{2} (771.8/sq mi) (29th)
- GDP (PPP): 2025 estimate
  - Total: ▲$3.769 billion (177th)
  - Per capita: ▲$29,258 (73rd)
- GDP (nominal): 2025 estimate
  - Total: ▲$2.715 billion (168th)
  - Per capita: ▲$14,647 (72nd)
- Gini (2016): 51.2 high inequality
- HDI (2023): ▲0.748 high (103rd)
- Currency: East Caribbean dollar (XCD)
- Time zone: UTC−4 (AST)
- Date format: dd/mm/yyyy
- Calling code: +1
- ISO 3166 code: LC
- Internet TLD: .lc

Saint Lucia (Note: (/ˈluːʃə/; LOO-shə) Saint Lucian Creole French: Sent Lisi) (also written as St. Lucia) is an island country in the eastern and southern Caribbean. Part of the Windward Islands of the Lesser Antilles, it is located north/northeast of the island of Saint Vincent, northwest of Barbados and south of Martinique. It covers a land area of 617 km^{2} (238 sq mi) with an officially estimated population of over 184,100 people as of mid 2023. The nation's capital and largest city is Castries.

The first proven inhabitants of the island, the Arawaks, are believed to have been the first to settle on the island in 200–400 AD. In 800 AD, the island was taken over by the Kalinago. The French were the first European colonists to settle on the island, and they signed a treaty with the native Caribs in 1660. The English took control of the island in 1663. In ensuing years, England and France fought 14 times for control of the island; consequently control over this immensely valuable geopolitical position changed frequently. Eventually, the British took complete control in 1814, shortly after the victory over French Emperor Napoleon I. Because the island switched so often between British and French control, Saint Lucia was also known as the "Helen of the West" after the Greek mythological character, Helen of Troy.

Representative government was introduced in 1924 with universal suffrage being established in 1951. From 1958 to 1962, the island was a member of the West Indies Federation. On 22 February 1979, Saint Lucia became an independent state, while remaining as a Commonwealth realm.

Saint Lucia is a member of the United Nations, the Organization of American States, the World Trade Organization, Caribbean Community (CARICOM) and the Organisation of Eastern Caribbean States (OECS). It is also a member of the Organisation internationale de la Francophonie.

== Etymology ==
Saint Lucia is named after Saint Lucy of Syracuse (283–304 AD). Legend states that French sailors were shipwrecked on the island on 13 December, the feast day of St. Lucy, and therefore named the island in her honour.

A globe in the Vatican from 1520 shows the island as Sancta Lucia, indicating that the island was instead named by early Spanish explorers. Saint Lucia was first known as Louanalao by the Arawak Indians in 200 AD, meaning "Island of the Iguanas," and then as Hewanorra, in 800 AD, meaning "there where iguanas are found," when the Carib Indians arrived and assimilated their culture into Saint Lucia.

== History ==
=== Pre-Columbian ===
The first proven inhabitants of Saint Lucia were the Arawaks, though there may have been other native peoples prior to them. The Arawaks are believed to have come from northern South America, sometime around 200–400 AD, as there are numerous archaeological sites on the island where specimens of their pottery have been found.

The Kalinago (Island Caribs) arrived around 800 AD, and seized control from the Arawaks by killing their men and assimilating the women into their own society.

=== Early European exploration and colonization ===
It is possible that Christopher Columbus may have sighted the island during his fourth voyage in 1502, but he does not mention the island in his log. Juan de la Cosa noted the island on his map of 1500, calling it El Falcon, and another island to the south Las Agujas. A Spanish cédula from 1511 mentions the island within the Spanish domain, and a globe in the Vatican made in 1520, shows the island as Sancta Lucia.

In the late 1550s, the French pirate François le Clerc (known as Jambe de Bois, due to his wooden leg) set up a camp on Pigeon Island, from where he attacked passing Spanish ships. In 1605, an English vessel, Oliphe Blossome, was blown off-course on its way to Guyana. As a result, 67 colonists started a settlement on Saint Lucia, after initially being welcomed by the Carib chief Anthonie. By 26 September 1605, only 19 survived following continued attacks by the Carib chief Augraumart, so the settlers fled the island. The English tried to settle the island again in 1638, but the Caribs continued to be hostile. Eventually, the French successfully claimed the island in 1650 and they signed a treaty with the Caribs in 1660. In 1664, Thomas Warner (son of Sir Thomas Warner, the governor of St Kitts) claimed Saint Lucia for England but the English fled again in 1666, with the French gaining full control of the island after the signing of the Treaty of Breda. Saint Lucia was made an official French crown colony in 1674 as a dependency of Martinique.

=== 18th and 19th centuries ===
After the slave-based sugar industry developed, both the British and the French found the island attractive. During the 18th century, the island changed ownership, or was declared neutral territory, a dozen times, although the French settlements remained and the island was a de facto French colony well into the eighteenth century.

In 1722, George I of Great Britain granted both Saint Lucia and Saint Vincent to the 2nd Duke of Montagu. Montagu appointed Nathaniel Uring, a merchant sea captain and adventurer, as deputy-governor. Uring went to the islands with a group of seven ships, and established settlement at Petit Carenage. Unable to get enough support from British warships, he and the new colonists were quickly run off by the French.

During the Seven Years' War, Britain occupied Saint Lucia for a year, but handed the island back to the French in 1763, under the Treaty of Paris. In 1765, the French began to develop the land for the cultivation of sugar cane as a commodity crop on large plantations. During the American Revolutionary War, the British captured the island in 1778, but returned it to France in 1783 under the terms of the Treaty of Paris.

In January 1791, during the French Revolution the National Assembly sent four commissioners to Saint Lucia to counter Royalist sentiments there. By August 1791, slaves began to abandon their estates and Governor Jean-Joseph Sourbader de Gimat fled. Following the outbreak of the French Revolutionary Wars and proclamation of the French First Republic, in December 1792 Lieutenant Jean-Baptiste Raymond de Lacrosse arrived in Saint Lucia with revolutionary pamphlets and the colony's poor whites and free people of colour began to arm themselves. On 1 February 1793, France declared war on Britain and General Nicolas Xavier de Ricard became governor. The National Convention abolished slavery on 4 February 1794, and on 1 April Saint Lucia was captured by British forces under Vice-admiral John Jervis. However, a combined force of maroons and fugitive white French regulars who called themselves French: Armée Française dans les Bois, lit. 'French Army in the Woods' began to fight back, starting the First Brigand War.

In June 1795, French forces under the nominal control of Victor Hugues recaptured the island from the British. However, in 1796 a British expeditionary force landed on Saint Lucia and recaptured it from the French, during which Castries was burned; the recapture became known as the Second Brigand War. The British returned Saint Lucia to France in 1802 under the Treaty of Amiens, which ended the French Revolutionary Wars. However, following the outbreak of the Napoleonic Wars in May 1803, the British once again recaptured the colony. Much of the Armee Française dans les Bois escaped into the island's interior where they evaded capture and established maroon communities.

Slavery on the island continued for a short time, but anti-slavery sentiment was rising in Britain. The British stopped the import of slaves by anyone, of whatever ethnicity, when they abolished the slave trade in 1807. France and Great Britain continued to contest Saint Lucia until the British secured it in 1814, as part of the Treaty of Paris, ending the Napoleonic Wars. Thereafter, Saint Lucia was considered one of the British Windward Islands colonies.

The institution of slavery was abolished on the island in 1834, as it was throughout the British Empire. After abolition, all former slaves had to serve a four-year "apprenticeship", to accustom them to the idea of freedom. During that period, they worked for their former masters for at least three-quarters of the work week. Full freedom was duly granted by the British in 1838. By that time, people of African ethnicity greatly outnumbered those of ethnic European background. People of Carib descent also comprised a minority on the island.

Flag of Saint Lucia 1939–1967

=== 20th century ===
Saint Lucia's first representative government was introduced in 1924, with the first election taking place in 1925. Many Saint Lucians served during the Second World War, and the conflict visited the island directly during the Battle of the Caribbean, when a German U-boat attacked and sank two British ships in Castries harbour on 9 March 1942. The US used the island as a military hub during the war, including setting up a secondary naval base in Gros Islet and using what is now the island's international airport as an air force base.

Universal suffrage was introduced in 1951 and elections were held the same year. In 1958, Saint Lucia joined the West Indies Federation, although the federation was dissolved just a few years later in 1962. In 1967, Saint Lucia became one of the six members of the West Indies Associated States, with internal self-government. Independence was peacefully gained in 1979 under Sir John Compton of United Workers Party, with the island remaining within the British Commonwealth, keeping then-Queen Elizabeth II as Monarch, represented locally by a Governor-General.

=== Post-independence era ===
Despite leading the country to independence, Compton's initial term as prime minister lasted only a few months, being defeated by the Saint Lucia Labour Party (SLP) under Allan Louisy in the 1979 Saint Lucian general election. In 1980, Hurricane Allen struck the island, destroying much of its infrastructure and reducing economic growth. Compton returned to power after the 1982 Saint Lucian general election after much instability during the labour government's term. During Compton's second term as the island's leader, banana exports significantly increased and became the nation's main source of revenue. There were improvements to infrastructure, and education was expanded to rural areas. Saint Lucia was key to the US invasion of Grenada. During the 1990s and 2000s, the nation's economy began shifting from agriculture to tourism under the leadership of Kenny Anthony. The 9/11 attacks in the United States in 2001 killed two Saint Lucians, and caused an economic slowdown, although moderate growth continued until the Great Recession. The recession, as well as the landfall of Hurricane Tomas in 2010, led to slow economic growth during the early 2010s, although the economy picked up during the later part of the decade and avoided contraction until 2020, after the COVID-19 pandemic caused major economic issues globally.

In June 2016, the United Workers Party (UWP), led by Allen Michael Chastanet, won 11 of the 17 seats in the general election, ousting the St Lucia Labour Party (SLP) of the incumbent Prime Minister Kenny Anthony. However, Saint Lucia Labour Party won the next election in July 2021, meaning its leader Philip J Pierre became the ninth Prime Minister of Saint Lucia since independence. St Lucia Labour Party (SLP) of prime minister Philip Pierre kept its majority in the 2025 election.

== Geography ==
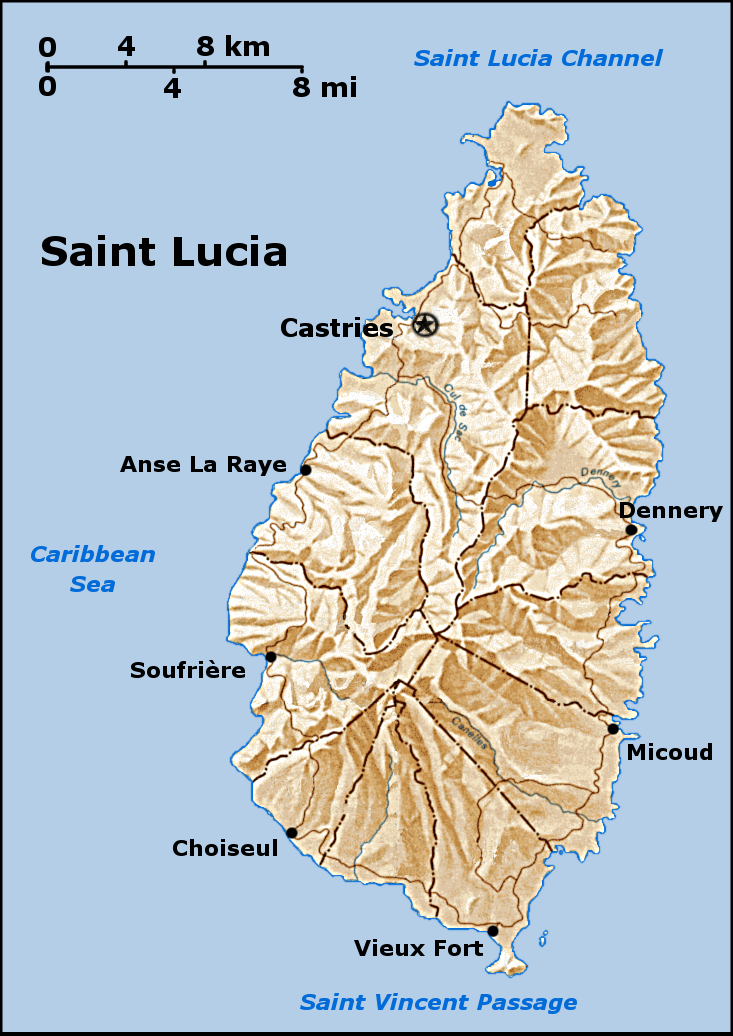
A map of Saint Lucia

Saint Lucia has a total area of 617 km^{2} (238 sq mi). As a volcanic island, Saint Lucia is very mountainous, with its highest point being Mount Gimie, at 950 m (3,120 ft) above sea level. The Pitons, two mountainous volcanic plugs, form the island's most famous landmark. Saint Lucia is also home to the world's only drive-in volcano, the Sulphur Springs. There are a number of small islands off the coast, the largest of which are the Maria Islands, located in the south-east of the island.

Saint Lucia lies at latitude 14° N and longitude 61° W. The population tends to be concentrated around the coast, with the interior more sparsely populated, due to the presence of dense forests.

=== Flora and fauna ===
Many species are endemic to the island, including Anolis luciae, a species of lizard, and Boa orophias, a species of boid snake.

=== Ecoregions ===
Saint Lucia has five terrestrial ecoregions: Windward Islands moist forests, Leeward Islands dry forests, Windward Islands dry forests, Windward Islands xeric scrub, and Lesser Antilles mangroves. The country had a 2019 Forest Landscape Integrity Index mean score of 6.17/10, ranking it 84th globally out of 172 countries.

=== Climate ===
Saint Lucia has a tropical climate, specifically a tropical rainforest climate (Af), moderated by northeast trade winds, with a dry season from 1 December to 31 May, and a wet/rainy season from 1 June to 30 November.

Average daytime and nighttime temperatures are around 30 °C (86 °F), and 24 °C (75 °F) respectively. Being fairly close to the equator, the island's temperature does not fluctuate much between winter and summer.

Climate data for St Lucia
Month	Jan	Feb	Mar	Apr	May	Jun	Jul	Aug	Sep	Oct	Nov	Dec	Year
Mean daily maximum °C (°F)	29 (84)	29 (84)	29 (84)	30 (86)	31 (88)	31 (88)	31 (88)	31 (88)	31 (88)	31 (88)	30 (86)	29 (84)	30 (86)
Daily mean °C (°F)	26 (79)	26 (79)	26 (79)	27 (81)	28 (82)	28 (82)	28 (82)	28 (82)	28 (82)	28 (82)	27 (81)	26 (79)	27 (81)
Mean daily minimum °C (°F)	23 (73)	23 (73)	24 (75)	24 (75)	25 (77)	25 (77)	25 (77)	25 (77)	25 (77)	25 (77)	24 (75)	24 (75)	24 (76)
Average precipitation mm (inches)	125 (4.9)	95 (3.7)	75 (3.0)	90 (3.5)	125 (4.9)	200 (7.9)	245 (9.6)	205 (8.1)	225 (8.9)	260 (10.2)	215 (8.5)	160 (6.3)	2,020 (79.5)
Average precipitation days	14	9	10	10	11	15	18	16	17	20	18	16	174
Mean monthly sunshine hours	248	226	248	240	248	240	248	248	240	217	240	248	2,891
Source: climatestotravel

=== Geology ===
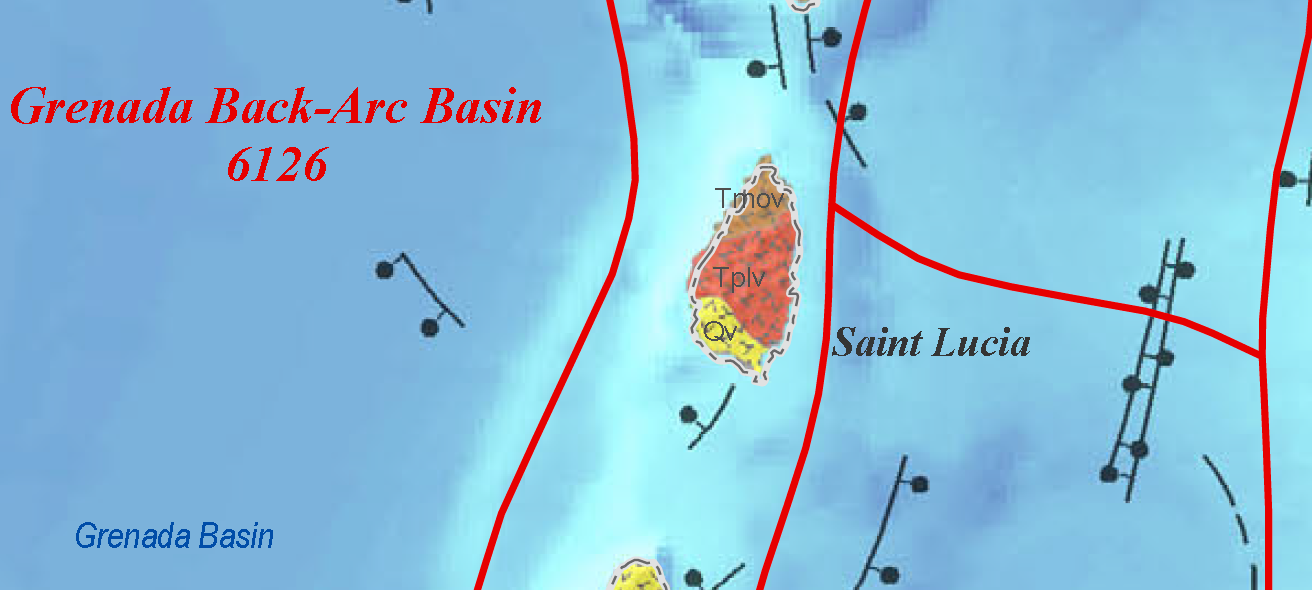
Geological map of Saint Lucia.

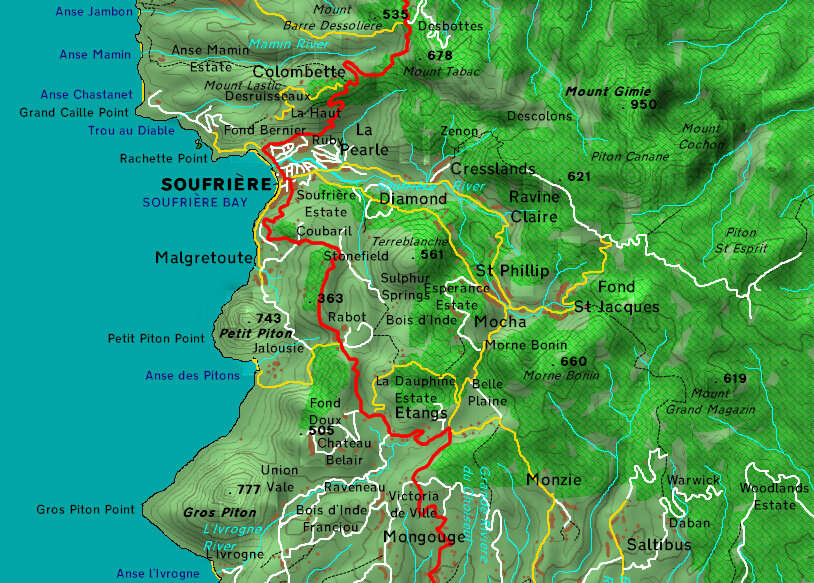
Topography of the Soufriere Volcanic Complex

The geology of St. Lucia can be described as composing three main areas. The oldest, 16–18 Ma, volcanic rocks are exposed from Castries northward and consist of eroded basalt and andesite centres. The middle, central highlands, portion of the island consists of dissected andesite centres, 10.4 to 1 Mya, while the lower southwest portion of the island contains recent activity from the Soufriere Volcanic Centre (SVC). This SVC, centred about the Qualibou depression, contains pyroclastic flow deposits, lava flows, domes, block and ash flow deposits, and explosion craters. This depression's perimeter includes the town of Soufriere, Mount Tabac, Mt. Gimie, Morne Bonin, and Gros Piton. At 10 km (6.2 mi) in diameter, though the western portion is open towards the Grenada basin, the depression formed as recently as 100 kya. The depression is noted for its geothermal activity, especially at Sulphur Springs and Soufrière Estates, a phreatic eruption in 1776, and recent seismic activity in 2000–2001.

Eroded andesitic stratovolcanoes to the north east of the depression include Mt. Gimie, Piton St Esprit, and Mt. Grand Magazin, all greater than 1 Mya in age. Andesitic and dacite pyroclastic flows from these volcanoes are found at Morne Tabac dome (532 kya), Morne Bonin dome (273 kya), and Bellevue (264 kya). Avalanche deposits from the formation of the Qualibou depression are found offshore, and in the massive blocks of Rabot, Pleisance, and Coubaril. The dacitic domes of Petit Piton (109 kya) and Gros Piton (71 kya) were then extruded onto the depression floor accompanied by the Anse John (104 kya) and La Pointe (59.8 kya) pyroclastic flows. Later, pyroclastic flows include pumice-rich Belfond and Anse Noir (20 kya). Finally, the dacitic domes of Terre Blanche (15.3 kya) and Belfond (13.6 kya) formed within the depression.

== Government and politics ==
Main office-holders

King of Saint Lucia:
Charles III
since
8 September 2022

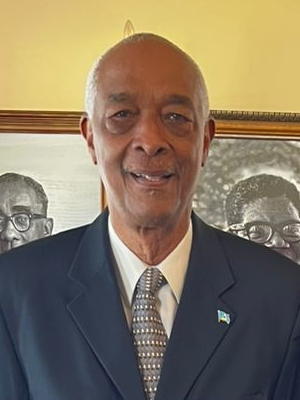
Acting Governor-General of Saint Lucia:
Felix Finisterre
since
1 August 2026

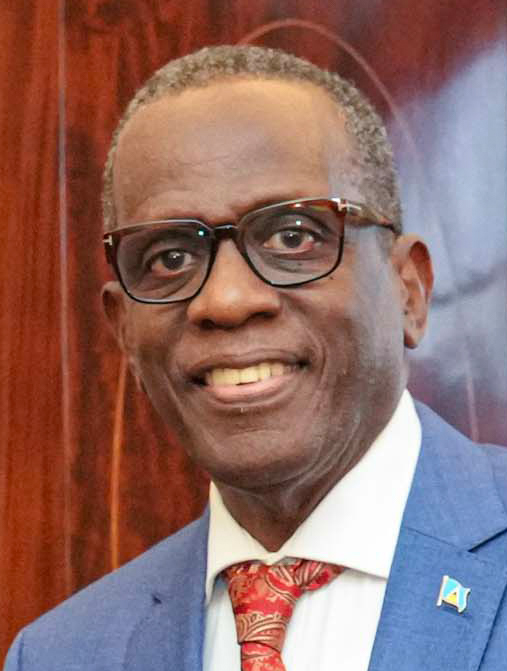
Prime Minister of Saint Lucia:
Philip J. Pierre
since
28 July 2021

Like most Caribbean countries, Saint Lucia is a unitary state with a parliamentary system. It is a Commonwealth realm and a constitutional monarchy, with the current monarch being Charles III, who is represented on the island by a governor-general, currently Errol Charles. The prime minister (currently Philip J. Pierre) is the head of government, the head of the cabinet, and is normally the leader of the largest party in the House of Assembly. The house has 17 seats, with each member being elected via a plurality of votes in their constituency. The upper chamber of Parliament is the Senate which has 11 appointed members, the majority of which are appointed by the prime minister.

=== Administrative divisions ===
The 10 Districts of Saint Lucia

Saint Lucia is made up of 10 districts. The districts were created and named by French colonials, and the British chose to keep the names in an anglicised form. The largest district in both size and population is Castries, where the nation's capital of the same name is located. The following are the 10 districts placed in alphabetical order:

- Anse la Raye
- Canaries
- Castries
- Choiseul
- Dennery
- Gros Islet
- Laborie
- Micoud
- Soufrière
- Vieux Fort

=== Foreign relations ===
Saint Lucia is a member of the Caribbean Community, Organisation of Eastern Caribbean States, the Organization of American States and Organisation internationale de la Francophonie. As a Commonwealth Realm, Saint Lucia has relatively friendly relations with United Kingdom and Canada. France is also a major ally, in part due to Saint Lucia's border with Martinique. The United States is the island's largest trading partner, and Saint Lucia was key to the US invasion of Grenada in 1983, and voted against condemning the invasion. Saint Lucia became the 152nd member of the United Nations on 18 September 1979.

Saint Lucia does not have a military although the Royal Saint Lucia Police Force has a Special Service Unit (SSU) and a Coast Guard. The island signed the UN Treaty on the Prohibition of Nuclear Weapons in 2018.

=== Law and crime ===
Saint Lucia is a mixed jurisdiction, meaning that it has a legal system based in part on both civil law and English common law. The Civil Code of St. Lucia of 1867 was based on the Quebec Civil Code of 1866, as supplemented by English common law-style legislation. The Judicial Committee of the Privy Council was Saint Lucia's final court of appeal until 2023, when a constitutional amendment transferred this to the Caribbean Court of Justice.

Saint Lucia's homicide rate has hit record highs in recent years. There were 75 homicides in 2021, a 34.5% increase compared with 55 homicides in 2020. 2021 saw the island record the most homicides in its history, and also its highest murder rate in its history, at 40 murders per 100,000 people.

== Economy ==
Saint Lucia is a Small Island Developing State, a designation similar to a developing country with a few substantial differences due to Saint Lucia's island nature. The service sector is the largest sector of the economy, accounting for 86.9% of GDP in 2020, followed by industrial and agricultural sectors at 10.9% and 2.2%, respectively.

Saint Lucia has been able to attract foreign business and investment due to its educated workforce and improvements in roads, communications, water supply, sewerage, and port facilities. Like most small islands, tourism and offshore banking are Saint Lucia's main sources of revenue. Agriculture, specifically the banana industry, was previously the largest sector of the economy, although its importance has declined significantly. The island's manufacturing sector has been called the most diverse in the Eastern Caribbean, with goods such as plastic being produced on a large scale.

Saint Lucia's currency is the Eastern Caribbean Dollar (EC$), a regional currency shared among members of the Eastern Caribbean Currency Union (ECU). The country's main trade partners are the US, UK, EU and other CARICOM countries.

=== Tourism ===
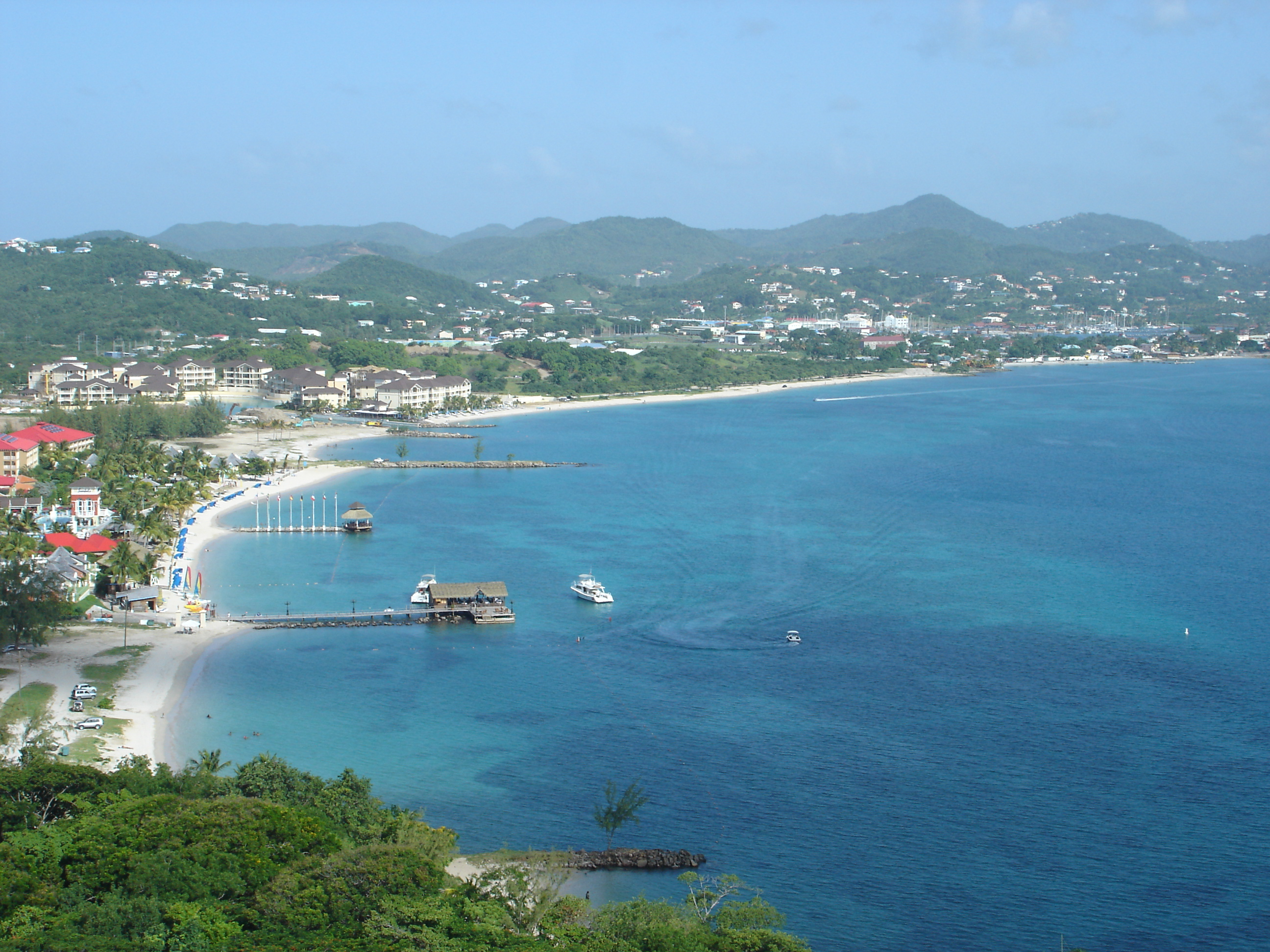
Gros Islet and Rodney Bay, as seen from Pigeon Island

Tourism is the largest contributor to Saint Lucia's economy. Tourist numbers tend to be more substantial during the dry season (January to April), often referred to as the tourist season. Saint Lucia's tropical weather, scenery, beaches and resorts have made it a popular tourist destination, with 1.29 million visitors arriving in 2019.

Some of Saint Lucia's tourist attractions include the Sulphur Springs, the Botanical Gardens, Pigeon Island and The Pitons.

=== Agriculture ===
The agricultural sector was once the main contributor to Saint Lucia's economy. This was especially thanks to the exporting of bananas. However, its importance to the economy has declined significantly, in part due to increased competition from South American countries in the banana industry. Nevertheless, agriculture is still an important part of the country's economy, providing 7.9% of jobs and contributing to 2.2% of the GDP in 2021.

In the early 2020s, about 18% of land was used for agricultural practices. Bananas remain the main agricultural product grown in Saint Lucia, as well as coconuts, cocoa beans, mangoes, avocados, vegetables, citrus fruits, and root crops, such as yams and sweet potatoes.

Saint Lucia also has a small livestock sector, which is dominated by poultry. The island is self-sufficient in egg production and production of poultry and pork has increased in recent years. Fishing has also been of considerable importance to the nation's economy.

=== Infrastructure ===
Saint Lucia has a wide-ranging public bus network which covers most of the island. Busses are owned by private individuals, while the government is responsible for setting up routes and hubs. The road network covers most of the island, although some rural areas still lack access to proper roads.

The island has two airports, including the Hewanorra International Airport. Cruising and yachting are very important to the country's economy, with the main sea port being located in Castries, while the main marina is located in Rodney Bay which is also home to the St. Lucia Yacht Club. Meanwhile, the nation's main oil refinery is located in Bexon.

The main source of electricity in Saint Lucia is oil through its sole power station, the Cul De Sac Power Station, although solar energy is also a major source. There have also been attempts to introduce geothermal and wind energy to the island.

== Demographics ==
A census is normally held in Saint Lucia every 10 years. In the 2022 census, Saint Lucia reported a population of 172,948 in 65,951 households. This was a 4.4% increase from the 165,595 recorded at the previous census in 2010. Ages 0–14 made up 18.8% of the population while those 65 and over made up 5.5%. Nearly 40% of the island's population lived in the District of Castries, where the nation's capital of the same name is located.

Saint Lucia had a fertility rate of 1.4 children per woman in 2021, the lowest in the Americas. This is much lower than in 1990, when the birth rate was 3.4 children per woman, and significantly lower than in 1959, when the birth rate peaked at 6.98 children per woman. Most emigration from Saint Lucia is primarily to Anglophone countries, with the UK having almost 10,000 Saint Lucian-born citizens, and over 30,000 of Saint Lucian heritage. The US is home to many Saint Lucians, especially areas such as Miami and New York City. Canada is also home to many Saint Lucians, and especially the city of Montréal in the French-speaking province of Quebec. The median age of Saint Lucians was 33.1 years in 2021.

=== Ethnic groups ===
Saint Lucia was originally populated by Amerindian peoples. However, European colonisation led to a significant drop in the indigenous populations. Most residents of the island were white planters, but African slaves and indentured servants brought by the Europeans eventually came to outnumber them. Because of this, Saint Lucia's population is predominantly of African and mixed descent. As of 2010, 85.3% of the population are black and 10.9% are of multiracial descent. Other groups include Indo-Caribbean persons (2.2%), whites (0.6%), and Indigenous Persons (0.6%). A small number of Kalinago live in the Choiseul region and in other towns on the western coast. There is also a small population of Lebanese and Syrians.

=== Languages ===
The official language of Saint Lucia is English, though Saint Lucian French Creole (Kwéyòl) is widely spoken. Referred to colloquially as Patois ("Patwa"), it is spoken by a majority of the population. It is a dialect of Antillean Creole and is also related to Haitian Creole, though it nonetheless has a number of distinctive features from the latter. The Creole language developed during the early period of French colonisation and is derived chiefly from French and West African languages. There have been some attempts to make the language official, but they have not yet been successful.

=== Religion ===
Religion in Saint Lucia (2022 census)
1. Roman Catholicism (50.6%)
2. Seventh-day Adventism (10.8%)
3. Pentecostalism (9.00%)
4. Other Christians (5.60%)
5. Rastafari (1.40%)
6. Other religions (incl. Hinduism, Islam, Baháʼí Faith, etc.) (2.60%)
7. None (14.1%)
8. Not stated (4.10%)

In the 2022 census, a majority of Saint Lucians identified as Christians. This can be traced back to the nation's colonization by French and British settlers. Due to heavy French influence, most Christians on the island are Catholics, with 50.6% of the island's residents identifying as such. The remaining population identifies mostly with Protestant denominations like Seventh-day Adventist and Pentecostal churches. About 1.9% of the population identified as members of the Rastafari movement. The number of residents claiming no religion stood at 14.1% in 2022 up from 5.9% in the 2011 Census.

There is no state religion in Saint Lucia. The nation's constitution guarantees freedom of religion and prohibits forcing persons to take oath to any religion in which they do not follow. Religious groups are also guaranteed the freedom to establish places of education.

=== Education ===
Most primary and secondary schools in Saint Lucia are operated by the government. Education is free and compulsory for children aged five to fifteen. This includes seven years of primary school and three to five years of secondary school. In the last two years of secondary school, students are allowed to choose the subjects that they would like to do, in preparation for regional Caribbean Examinations Council (CSEC) examinations. In 2020, public spending on education was at 3.6%.

Tertiary educational facilities on the island are normally private institutions. These include Monroe University and International American University. However, there are still a few public institutions, including the Sir Arthur Lewis Community College and the University of the West Indies.

=== Health ===
Health services in Saint Lucia are split between the government and private institutions. The island is served by two public hospitals and multiple health centres, although most dental and vision services are private. Public expenditure on healthcare stood at 2.1% in 2019.

In 2021, life expectancy was at 71.1 years (67.8 for men and 74.7 for women). This was compared to 73.4 years in 2019. The drop in life expectancy was largely attributed to the COVID-19 pandemic.

== Culture ==
The culture of Saint Lucia has been influenced by African, East Indian, French, and English heritage. The main secondary language of the island is Saint Lucian Creole (Kwéyòl), a French-based creole spoken by most of the population. The island boasts the highest ratio of Nobel laureates produced with respect to the total population of any sovereign country in the world. (Note: See List of countries by Nobel laureates per capita for more information.) Two winners have come from Saint Lucia: Sir Arthur Lewis, who won the Nobel Prize in Economics in 1979, and the poet Derek Walcott, who received the Nobel Prize in Literature in 1992.

Saint Lucia has two flower festivals, the La Rose festival, celebrated on 30 August, and the La Marguerite festival, celebrated on 17 October. Every summer, the island hosts a carnival as a way to present the country's culture and music. Annually, there are normally many festivals, most of them being music-related.

=== Music ===
Saint Lucian music is heavily influenced by elements of African music, especially rhythmically. The most popular music genres in Saint Lucia are calypso, soca, dancehall, reggae, zouk, and folk music. Dennery Segment, a genre influenced by Angolan Kuduro, Saint Lucian Solo music and Dancehall was developed on the island. The internationally renowned Saint Lucia Jazz Festival is held annually, and the festival is a major source of revenue for the country's economy.

=== Cuisine ===
Saint Lucian cuisine is a mix of African, European, Indian and Caribbean dishes. Some common dishes include macaroni pie, stewed chicken, rice and peas, roti (Indian flatbreads) and soups made with fresh locally produced vegetables. All mainstream meat and poultry are eaten in St. Lucia; meat and seafood are normally stewed and browned to create a rich gravy sometimes served over "ground provisions" (vegetables) or rice. Johnny cakes (known as bakes) are also common, and are served with different side dishes, such as saltfish. The national dish of Saint Lucia is green figs and saltfish.

=== Sports ===
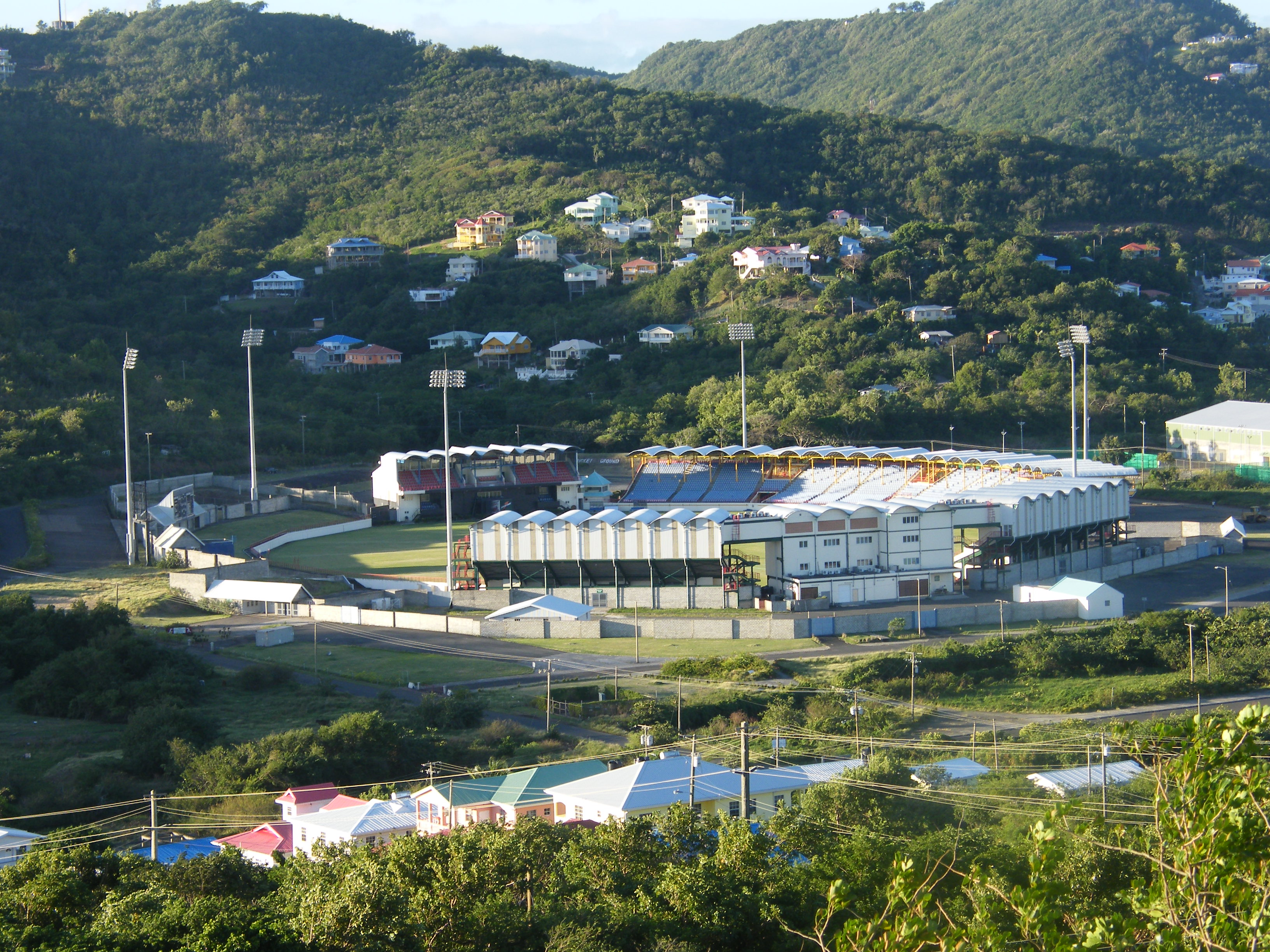
The Daren Sammy Cricket Ground in Beausejour

As with most Caribbean islands, cricket is the most popular sport in Saint Lucia. The Windward Islands cricket team includes players from Saint Lucia and plays in the West Indies Championship. Daren Sammy became the first Saint Lucian to represent the West Indies cricket team on his debut in 2007, and was made captain in 2010. As captain, he led the team to two ICC Men's T20 World Cup titles in both 2012 and 2016. Saint Lucia is also home to The Saint Lucia Kings, a T20 franchise playing in the Caribbean Premier League. Sailing is a major sport in Saint Lucia, with the Atlantic Rally for Cruisers (ARC) race beginning in the Canary Islands and ending on the island. Other sports that are popular on the island include football, basketball, tennis, golf and volleyball. Karate and boxing have also seen increased popularity in recent years.

Julien Alfred won the nation's first-ever Olympic medal, when she won the women's 100 meters event in 10.72 seconds at the 2024 Summer Olympics held in Paris, France.

== See also ==
- Index of Saint Lucia-related articles
- Outline of Saint Lucia
