= Elections in Saint Lucia =

Saint Lucia elects on the national level a legislature. The Legislature has two chambers. The House of Assembly has 17 members, elected for a five-year term in single-seat constituencies. The Senate has 11 appointed members. Saint Lucia has a two-party system, which means that there are two dominant political parties, with extreme difficulty for anybody to achieve electoral success under the banner of any other party.

== Latest election ==
The Labour Party triumphed in the elections, winning 14 seats out of the 17 in the House of Assembly. The UWP won one seat; Micoud South, the seat of party leader Allen Chastanet. This was one of the seats the UWP had won in 2021; the other one, Choiseul, held by Bradley Felix, was lost to Labour Party member Keithson Charles. Two independents, Stephenson King of Castries North, and Richard Frederick of Castries Central, were reelected in their constituencies despite being expected to face much stiffer competition during the 2025 election. Both MPs were ex-UWP members. After the election, Pierre stated, "There is a place in Parliament for the opposition, and we will move forward and work moving forward together." Chastanet resigned as leader of the UWP on December 5, but his resignation was rejected by his party on 11 December.

Party	Votes	%	Seats	+/–
Saint Lucia Labour Party	48,855	55.77	14	+1
United Workers Party	32,597	37.21	1	–1
National Congress Party	42	0.05	0	New
Independents	6,108	6.97	2	0
Total	87,602	100.00	17	0
Valid votes	87,602	97.91		
Invalid/blank votes	1,869	2.09		
Total votes	89,471	100.00		
Registered voters/turnout	184,654	48.45		
Source: Electoral Department

=== By constituency ===
Constituency	Electorate	Turnout	%	Political party	Candidate	Votes	%
Anse la Raye/Canaries	8,940	4,975	55.65	Saint Lucia Labour Party	Wayne Girard	2,746	56.0
Anse la Raye/Canaries	8,940	4,975	55.65	United Workers Party	Dominic Fedee	2,154	44.0
Babonneau	13,905	6,718	48.31	Saint Lucia Labour Party	John Paul Estephane	3,918	58.8
Babonneau	13,905	6,718	48.31	United Workers Party	Leo Titus Preville	2,747	41.2
Castries Central	9,204	3,682	40.00	Independent	Richard Frederick	2,151	59.5
Castries Central	9,204	3,682	40.00	United Workers Party	Rosh Neshach Clarke	1,082	29.9
Castries Central	9,204	3,682	40.00	Independent	Stanley Felix	369	10.2
Castries Central	9,204	3,682	40.00	National Congress Party	Andre Robert Matthew	13	0.4
Castries East	12,861	5,289	41.12	Saint Lucia Labour Party	Philip J. Pierre	4,014	77.8
Castries East	12,861	5,289	41.12	United Workers Party	Peter Denis Chicot	1,142	22.2
Castries North	12,706	5,364	42.22	Independent	Stephenson King	3,485	66.0
Castries North	12,706	5,364	42.22	United Workers Party	Stephen John Feverier	1,722	32.6
Castries North	12,706	5,364	42.22	Independent	Marcellus Stiede	33	0.6
Castries North	12,706	5,364	42.22	National Congress Party	Jeana Merlissa Matthew	29	0.5
Castries North	12,706	5,364	42.22	Independent	Brenda Edwin	10	0.2
Castries South	9,795	4,942	50.45	Saint Lucia Labour Party	Ernest Hilaire	3,228	67.7
Castries South	9,795	4,942	50.45	United Workers Party	Tommy Hogarth Descartes	1,519	31.8
Castries South	9,795	4,942	50.45	Independent	David A. Hird	23	0.5
Castries South East	15,491	7,677	49.56	Saint Lucia Labour Party	Lisa Jawahir	4,299	57.4
Castries South East	15,491	7,677	49.56	United Workers Party	Guy Joseph	3,187	42.6
Choiseul	11,539	5,705	49.44	Saint Lucia Labour Party (gain)	Keithson Charles	2,941	53.9
Choiseul	11,539	5,705	49.44	United Workers Party	John Bradley Felix	2,517	46.1
Dennery North	9,261	4,873	52.62	Saint Lucia Labour Party	Shawn A. Edward	2,786	58.0
Dennery North	9,261	4,873	52.62	United Workers Party	Bradley Marcelle Fulgence	2,020	42.0
Dennery South	5,507	3,096	56.22	Saint Lucia Labour Party	Alfred Prospere	1,566	50.9
Dennery South	5,507	3,096	56.22	United Workers Party	Benson Valens Emile	1,508	49.1
Gros Islet	25,831	12,350	47.81	Saint Lucia Labour Party	Kenson Joel Casimir	8,175	67.9
Gros Islet	25,831	12,350	47.81	United Workers Party	Marcella Adella Johnson	3,861	32.1
Laborie	7,996	3,244	40.57	Saint Lucia Labour Party	Alva Baptiste	2,612	81.2
Laborie	7,996	3,244	40.57	United Workers Party	Laura Romina Jean Pierre	606	18.8
Micoud North	8,085	4,080	50.46	Saint Lucia Labour Party	Jeremiah Norbert	2,321	57.4
Micoud North	8,085	4,080	50.46	United Workers Party	Elisha Norbert	1,715	42.4
Micoud North	8,085	4,080	50.46	Independent	Marius Wilson	5	0.1
Micoud South	7,806	3,964	50.78	United Workers Party	Allen Chastanet	2,292	58.6
Micoud South	7,806	3,964	50.78	Saint Lucia Labour Party	Shanda Lee Harracksingh	1,619	41.4
Soufriere	8,532	5,210	61.06	Saint Lucia Labour Party	Emma Hippolyte	2,622	51.8
Soufriere	8,532	5,210	61.06	United Workers Party	Herod Adrien Stanislas	2,442	48.2
Vieux Fort North	7,205	3,451	47.90	Saint Lucia Labour Party	Moses Jean Baptiste	2,444	72.4
Vieux Fort North	7,205	3,451	47.90	United Workers Party	Calixte Ian Xavier	932	27.6
Vieux Fort South	9,990	4,851	48.56	Saint Lucia Labour Party	Danny Butcher	3,564	75.2
Vieux Fort South	9,990	4,851	48.56	United Workers Party	Leanna Eva Johannes-Paul	1,145	24.2
Vieux Fort South	9,990	4,851	48.56	Independent	David Troy Charles	18	0.4
Vieux Fort South	9,990	4,851	48.56	Independent	Choix Z. C Melchoir	14	0.3
Source: Electoral Department

== By-elections ==
=== 2006 Central Castries ===
Independent candidate Richard Frederick won the Castries Central seat at a by-election on 13 March 2006. Frederick defeated the former incumbent Sarah Flood-Beaubrun and Attorney General Victor La Corbiniere. The by-election was triggered by Flood-Beaubrun's resignation, an act of protest.

== See also ==
- Electoral calendar
- Electoral system
