= 2025 Saint Lucian general election =

- 1 December 2025

All 17 seats in the House of Assembly 9 seats needed for a majority
- Turnout: 48.45% (▼2.63 pp)
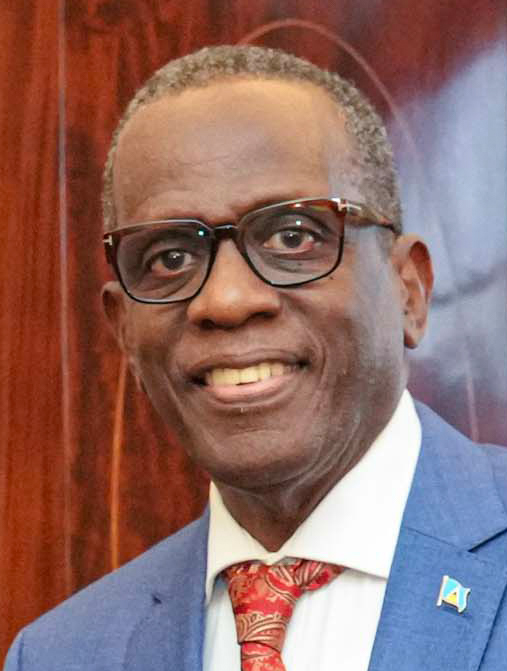

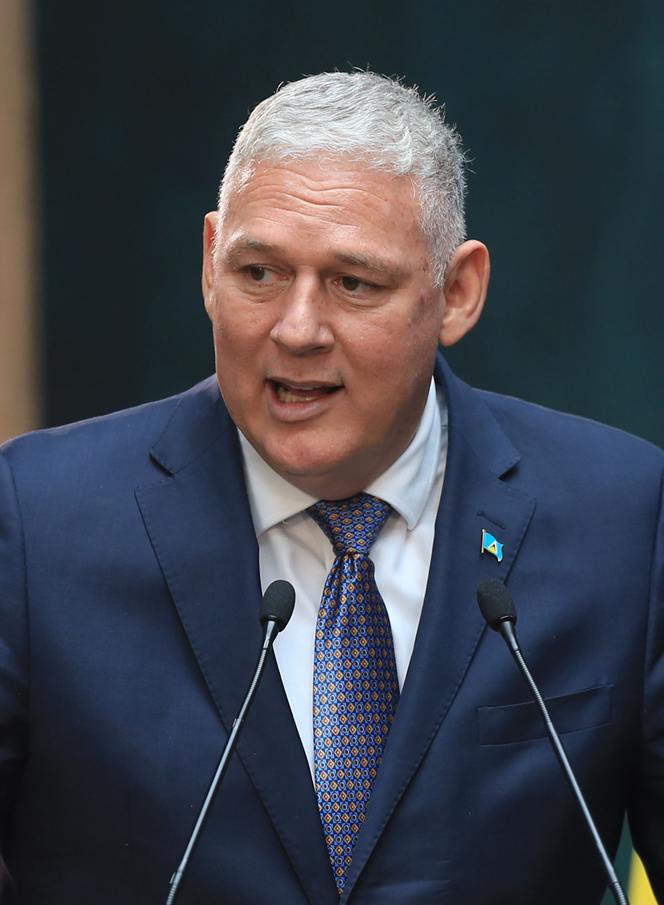
	First party	Second party
Leader	Philip J. Pierre	Allen Chastanet
Party	Labour Party	UWP
Last election	50.14%, 13 seats	42.91%, 2 seats
Seats won	14	1
Seat change	▲1	▼1
Popular vote	48,855	32,597
Percentage	55.77%	37.21%
Swing	▲5.63 pp	▼5.70 pp
- Results by constituency
Prime Minister before election
Philip J. Pierre
Labour Party
Elected Prime Minister
Philip J. Pierre
Labour Party

General elections were held in Saint Lucia on 1 December 2025 to elect all 17 members of the House of Assembly. The centre-left incumbent Saint Lucia Labour Party won a landslide, increasing both its number of seats and share of the popular vote. This was the first time since independence that an incumbent government improved its performance while seeking a second consecutive term. The centre-right opposition United Workers Party won only one seat, equalling its worst result alongside the 1997 election. The election also ended a 24-year streak of single-term governments, marking the first reelection of a government since 2001.

== Electoral system ==
The 17 elected members of the House of Assembly are elected by first-past-the-post in single member constituencies.

According to the constitution, elections for a new Parliament session can be held at the latest five years and 90 days after the opening of the previous session. The first session after the 2021 election was held on 17 August 2021, leaving the deadline for the next elections as November 2026.

== Campaign ==
Pierre called the elections formally on 9 November, with a nomination day of November 21 and an election day for 1 December. The Saint Lucian parliament was dissolved on 10 November for the campaign period. The ensuing campaign largely focused on crime, healthcare, infrastructure, youth opportunities, and economic growth.

During the campaign, Pierre advocated for stability and cautious economic management. Chastanet meanwhile blamed Pierre for a declining security situation due to less American support of the Royal Saint Lucia Police Force; this support was withdrawn amid human rights abuses by Saint Lucian police per the U.S Leahy Laws. Chastanet also called for a re-evaluation of the St. Lucian citizenship-by-investment program, which is an important source of income in the country but has been criticized by the United States for being allegedly exploitable by foreign adversaries.

The UWP's campaign was characterized as being rather inconsistent. Many members of the campaign sought to utilize the legacy of John Compton, the first prime minister of an independent St. Lucia and cofounder of the UWP, while others distanced themselves from him, seeking to instead create a messaging system outside of Compton. Additionally, while the UWP was seen as having grand messaging, said messaging was hindered by the lack of record on their part for their goals. By contrast, the Labour party ran a more ground-level campaign, capitalizing on their governance in the past few years to secure voter confidence.

== Results ==
The Labour Party triumphed in the elections, winning 14 seats out of the 17 in the House of Assembly. The UWP won one seat; Micoud South, the seat of party leader Allen Chastanet. This was one of the seats the UWP had won in 2021; the other one, Choiseul, held by Bradley Felix, was lost to Labour Party member Keithson Charles. Two independents, Stephenson King of Castries North, and Richard Frederick of Castries Central, were reelected in their constituencies despite being expected to face much stiffer competition during the 2025 election. Both MPs were ex-UWP members. After the election, Pierre stated, "There is a place in Parliament for the opposition, and we will move forward and work moving forward together." Chastanet resigned as leader of the UWP on December 5, but his resignation was rejected by his party on 11 December.

Party	Votes	%	Seats	+/–
Saint Lucia Labour Party	48,855	55.77	14	+1
United Workers Party	32,597	37.21	1	–1
National Congress Party	42	0.05	0	New
Independents	6,108	6.97	2	0
Total	87,602	100.00	17	0
Valid votes	87,602	97.91		
Invalid/blank votes	1,869	2.09		
Total votes	89,471	100.00		
Registered voters/turnout	184,654	48.45		
Source: Electoral Department

=== By constituency ===
Constituency	Electorate	Turnout	%	Political party	Candidate	Votes	%
Anse la Raye/Canaries	8,940	4,975	55.65	Saint Lucia Labour Party	Wayne Girard	2,746	56.0
Anse la Raye/Canaries	8,940	4,975	55.65	United Workers Party	Dominic Fedee	2,154	44.0
Babonneau	13,905	6,718	48.31	Saint Lucia Labour Party	John Paul Estephane	3,918	58.8
Babonneau	13,905	6,718	48.31	United Workers Party	Leo Titus Preville	2,747	41.2
Castries Central	9,204	3,682	40.00	Independent	Richard Frederick	2,151	59.5
Castries Central	9,204	3,682	40.00	United Workers Party	Rosh Neshach Clarke	1,082	29.9
Castries Central	9,204	3,682	40.00	Independent	Stanley Felix	369	10.2
Castries Central	9,204	3,682	40.00	National Congress Party	Andre Robert Matthew	13	0.4
Castries East	12,861	5,289	41.12	Saint Lucia Labour Party	Philip J. Pierre	4,014	77.8
Castries East	12,861	5,289	41.12	United Workers Party	Peter Denis Chicot	1,142	22.2
Castries North	12,706	5,364	42.22	Independent	Stephenson King	3,485	66.0
Castries North	12,706	5,364	42.22	United Workers Party	Stephen John Feverier	1,722	32.6
Castries North	12,706	5,364	42.22	Independent	Marcellus Stiede	33	0.6
Castries North	12,706	5,364	42.22	National Congress Party	Jeana Merlissa Matthew	29	0.5
Castries North	12,706	5,364	42.22	Independent	Brenda Edwin	10	0.2
Castries South	9,795	4,942	50.45	Saint Lucia Labour Party	Ernest Hilaire	3,228	67.7
Castries South	9,795	4,942	50.45	United Workers Party	Tommy Hogarth Descartes	1,519	31.8
Castries South	9,795	4,942	50.45	Independent	David A. Hird	23	0.5
Castries South East	15,491	7,677	49.56	Saint Lucia Labour Party	Lisa Jawahir	4,299	57.4
Castries South East	15,491	7,677	49.56	United Workers Party	Guy Joseph	3,187	42.6
Choiseul	11,539	5,705	49.44	Saint Lucia Labour Party (gain)	Keithson Charles	2,941	53.9
Choiseul	11,539	5,705	49.44	United Workers Party	John Bradley Felix	2,517	46.1
Dennery North	9,261	4,873	52.62	Saint Lucia Labour Party	Shawn A. Edward	2,786	58.0
Dennery North	9,261	4,873	52.62	United Workers Party	Bradley Marcelle Fulgence	2,020	42.0
Dennery South	5,507	3,096	56.22	Saint Lucia Labour Party	Alfred Prospere	1,566	50.9
Dennery South	5,507	3,096	56.22	United Workers Party	Benson Valens Emile	1,508	49.1
Gros Islet	25,831	12,350	47.81	Saint Lucia Labour Party	Kenson Joel Casimir	8,175	67.9
Gros Islet	25,831	12,350	47.81	United Workers Party	Marcella Adella Johnson	3,861	32.1
Laborie	7,996	3,244	40.57	Saint Lucia Labour Party	Alva Baptiste	2,612	81.2
Laborie	7,996	3,244	40.57	United Workers Party	Laura Romina Jean Pierre	606	18.8
Micoud North	8,085	4,080	50.46	Saint Lucia Labour Party	Jeremiah Norbert	2,321	57.4
Micoud North	8,085	4,080	50.46	United Workers Party	Elisha Norbert	1,715	42.4
Micoud North	8,085	4,080	50.46	Independent	Marius Wilson	5	0.1
Micoud South	7,806	3,964	50.78	United Workers Party	Allen Chastanet	2,292	58.6
Micoud South	7,806	3,964	50.78	Saint Lucia Labour Party	Shanda Lee Harracksingh	1,619	41.4
Soufriere	8,532	5,210	61.06	Saint Lucia Labour Party	Emma Hippolyte	2,622	51.8
Soufriere	8,532	5,210	61.06	United Workers Party	Herod Adrien Stanislas	2,442	48.2
Vieux Fort North	7,205	3,451	47.90	Saint Lucia Labour Party	Moses Jean Baptiste	2,444	72.4
Vieux Fort North	7,205	3,451	47.90	United Workers Party	Calixte Ian Xavier	932	27.6
Vieux Fort South	9,990	4,851	48.56	Saint Lucia Labour Party	Danny Butcher	3,564	75.2
Vieux Fort South	9,990	4,851	48.56	United Workers Party	Leanna Eva Johannes-Paul	1,145	24.2
Vieux Fort South	9,990	4,851	48.56	Independent	David Troy Charles	18	0.4
Vieux Fort South	9,990	4,851	48.56	Independent	Choix Z. C Melchoir	14	0.3
Source: Electoral Department
