= 2016 Saint Lucian general election =

← 2011	6 June 2016	2021 →

All 17 seats in the House of Assembly 9 seats needed for a majority
- Turnout: 53.45% (▼2.69pp)
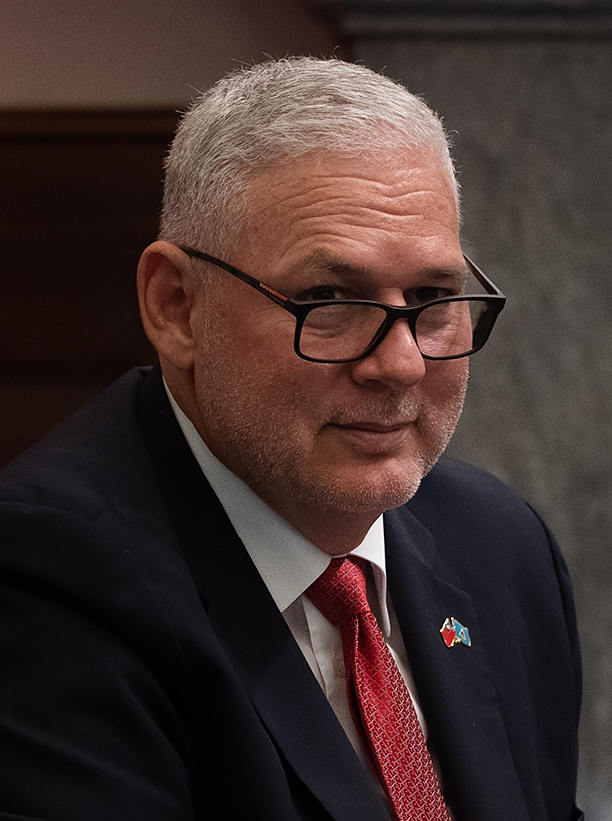

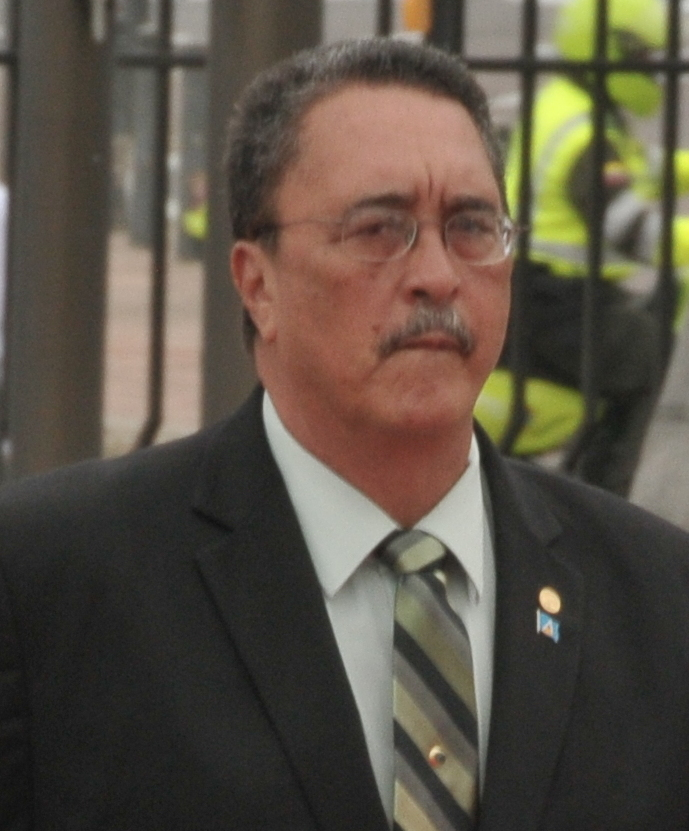
	First party	Second party
Leader	Allen Chastanet	Kenny Anthony
Party	UWP	Labour Party
Last election	46.96%, 6 seats	50.99%, 11 seats
Seats won	11	6
Seat change	▲5	▼5
Popular vote	46,165	37,172
Percentage	54.76%	44.09%
Swing	▲7.80pp	▼6.90pp
- Results by constituency.
Prime Minister before election
Kenny Anthony
Labour Party
Subsequent Prime Minister
Allen Chastanet
UWP

2016 campaign poster for future Saint Lucia Prime Minister Allen Chastanet

General elections were held in Saint Lucia on 6 June 2016. The result was a victory for the United Workers Party, which won eleven of the seventeen seats. On 7 June 2016 United Workers Party leader Allen Chastanet was sworn in as Prime Minister.

== Electoral system ==
The 17 elected members of the House of Assembly were elected by first-past-the-post voting in single member constituencies. Following the elections, a Speaker is elected, who may be from outside the House.

== Campaign ==
The opposition United Workers Party announced it would be fielding a full slate of 17 candidates. The ruling Labour Party campaign included 15 pledges to voters.

== Results ==
Party	Votes	%	Seats	+/–
United Workers Party	46,165	54.76	11	+5
Saint Lucia Labour Party	37,172	44.09	6	–5
Lucian People's Movement	152	0.18	0	0
Independents	813	0.96	0	0
Total	84,302	100.00	17	0
Valid votes	84,302	97.43		
Invalid/blank votes	2,223	2.57		
Total votes	86,525	100.00		
Registered voters/turnout	161,883	53.45		
Source: Saint Lucia Electoral Department

=== By constituency ===
Constituency	Winner	Party
Anse la Raye/Canaries	Dominic Fedee	United Workers Party gain
Babonneau	Ezechiel Joseph	United Workers Party gain
Castries Central	Sarah Flood-Beaubrun	United Workers Party hold
Castries East	Philip Pierre	Saint Lucia Labour Party hold
Castries North	Stephenson King	United Workers Party hold
Castries South	Ernest Hilaire	Saint Lucia Labour Party hold
Castries South East	Guy Joseph	United Workers Party hold
Choiseul/Saltibus	Bradley Felix	United Workers Party gain
Dennery North	Shawn Edward	Saint Lucia Labour Party hold
Dennery South	Edmund Estephane	United Workers Party hold
Gros Islet	Lenard Montoute	United Workers Party gain
Laborie	Alva Baptiste	Saint Lucia Labour Party hold
Micoud North	Gale Rigobert	United Workers Party hold
Micoud South	Allen Chastanet	United Workers Party hold
Soufriere	Herod Stanislaus	United Workers Party gain
Vieux Fort North	Moses Jean Baptiste	Saint Lucia Labour Party hold
Vieux Fort South	Kenny Anthony	Saint Lucia Labour Party hold
Source: St Lucia Times
