= 2021 Saint Lucian general election =

- 26 July 2021

All 17 seats in the House of Assembly 9 seats needed for a majority
- Turnout: 51.08% (▼2.37 pp)
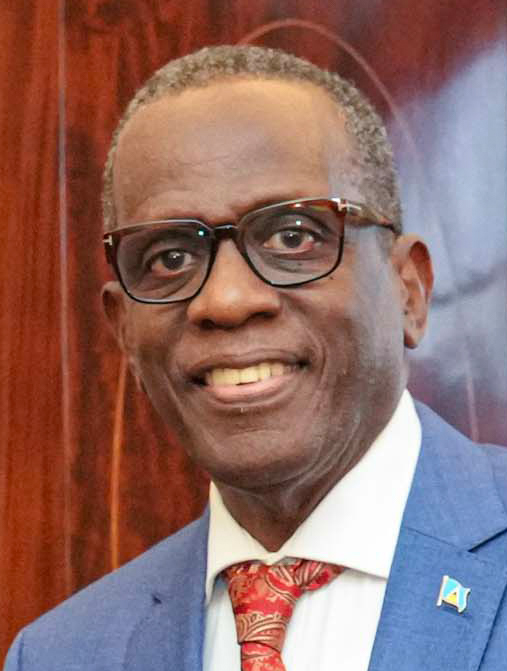

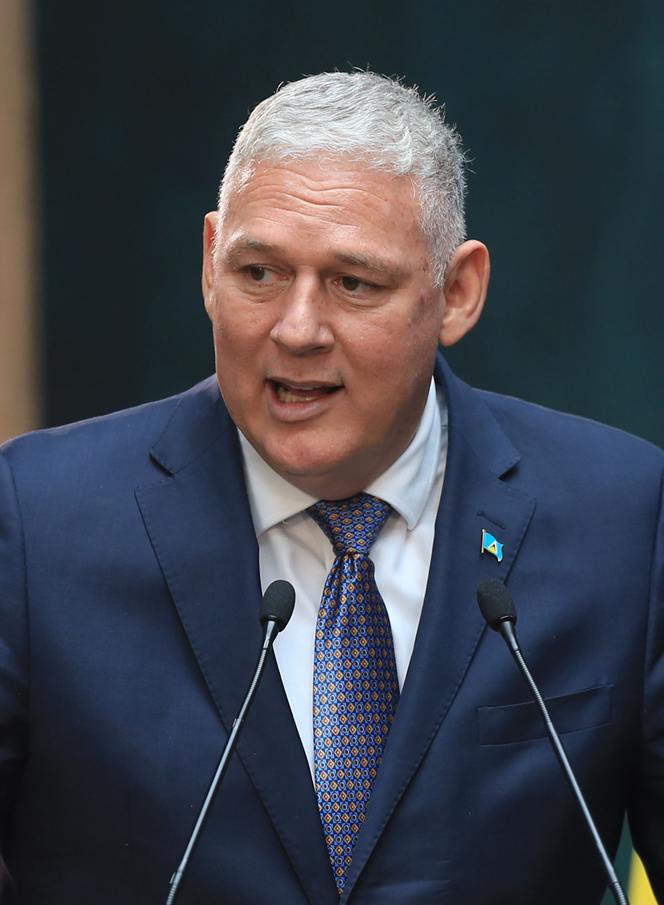
	First party	Second party
Leader	Philip J. Pierre	Allen Chastanet
Party	Labour Party	UWP
Last election	44.09%, 6 seats	54.76%, 11 seats
Seats won	13	2
Seat change	▲7	▼9
Popular vote	48,784	37,481
Percentage	50.14%	42.91%
Swing	▲6.05 pp	▼11.85 pp
- Results by constituency
Prime Minister before election
Allen Chastanet
UWP
Elected Prime Minister
Philip J. Pierre
Labour Party

General elections were held in Saint Lucia on 26 July 2021, having been constitutionally required by 12 October 2021. Voters elected all 17 members of the House of Assembly. The result was a victory for the opposition Saint Lucia Labour Party, which won 13 of the 17 seats in the House, while the ruling United Workers Party lost nine of its eleven seats, its worst result since 1997. It was the fourth consecutive election in which the incumbent government was defeated.

== Electoral system ==
The 17 elected members of the House of Assembly were elected by first-past-the-post in single member constituencies.

According to the constitution, elections for a new Parliament session can be held at the latest 5 years and 90 days after the opening of the previous session. The first session after the 2016 election was held on 12 July 2016, leaving the deadline in October 2021. Incumbent Prime Minister Allen Chastanet favoured a later date, stating in April 2021 his intent to avoid another outbreak of the COVID-19 pandemic in Saint Lucia. On 5 July 2021, he announced that the election would be held on 26 July.

== Campaign ==
Political parties began announcing prospective candidates in December 2020.

On Nomination Day, 16 July, the governing United Workers Party (UWP) nominated candidates for all 17 constituencies. The opposition Saint Lucia Labour Party (SLP) nominated candidates for 15 constituencies, not fielding candidates in two constituencies where former UWP members campaigned as independents. The National Green Party (NGP) nominated candidates for eight constituencies.

Although the parties held campaign rallies, they mutually agreed not to allow motorcades after warnings from health authorities.

In June 2021 the UWP announced a five-point pledge of top priority items it would deliver if re-elected: the pledge included additional support for needy persons, a reduction in VAT, electronic textbooks for students and a health insurance programme covering all citizens.

The NGP was founded on 23 May 2021. For the upcoming election, the party announced food security to be its key issue, along with constitutional reforms that the UWP and SLP had not passed. The NGP also proposed increased spending on social services and tourism infrastructure; these projects would be funded by establishing a legal cannabis industry.

== Conduct ==
The Caribbean Community sent a team of ten election observers for the main election as well as the advance polls on 23 July, and gave a favourable initial assessment. Chaired by Alvin Smith, the five-member team from the Commonwealth also praised the conduct of the elections, but criticised the slow updating of the voter registry. The Organization of American States sent a team of twelve election observers.

== Results ==
The opposition SLP won a supermajority of 13 of the 17 seats, a gain of seven. This was the highest number of seats won by a single party since 1997. The UWP retained only two seats, those of PM Chastanet and Commerce Minister Bradley Felix, with the party facing its second worst performance in history, only behind the 1997 elections. Among its many loses, the UWP lost the Micoud North seat for the first time since independence. Two former UWP members running as independents, Stephenson King and Richard Frederick, won their seats, both by large margins.

Party	Votes	%	Seats	+/–
Saint Lucia Labour Party	43,799	50.14	13	+7
United Workers Party	37,481	42.91	2	–9
National Green Party	271	0.31	0	New
Independents	5,807	6.65	2	+2
Total	87,358	100.00	17	0
Valid votes	87,358	98.10		
Invalid/blank votes	1,694	1.90		
Total votes	89,052	100.00		
Registered voters/turnout	174,332	51.08		
Source: Electoral Department

=== By constituency ===
Constituency	Electorate	Turnout	%	Political party	Candidate	Votes	%
Anse la Raye/Canaries	8,614	4,978	57.79	Saint Lucia Labour Party (gain)	Wayne Girard	2,468	51.6
Anse la Raye/Canaries	8,614	4,978	57.79	United Workers Party	Dominic Fedee	2,303	48.1
Anse la Raye/Canaries	8,614	4,978	57.79	National Green Party	Avalan Joseph	16	0.3
Babonneau	12,942	6,524	50.41	Saint Lucia Labour Party (gain)	Virginia Albert-Poyotte	3,245	50.9
Babonneau	12,942	6,524	50.41	United Workers Party	Ezechiel Joseph	3,135	49.1
Castries Central	9,102	3,687	40.51	Independent (gain)	Richard Frederick	2,099	57.5
Castries Central	9,102	3,687	40.51	United Workers Party	Sarah Flood-Beaubrun	1,494	41.0
Castries Central	9,102	3,687	40.51	National Green Party	Aaron Alexander	55	1.5
Castries East	12,739	5,658	44.41	Saint Lucia Labour Party	Philip J. Pierre	3,700	66.5
Castries East	12,739	5,658	44.41	United Workers Party	Fortuna C. Belrose	1,823	32.8
Castries East	12,739	5,658	44.41	National Green Party	Ubaidullah Muhammad	40	0.7
Castries North	12,282	5,327	43.37	Independent (gain)	Stephenson King	3,643	69.5
Castries North	12,282	5,327	43.37	United Workers Party	Jeannine Giraudy-McIntyre	1,530	29.2
Castries North	12,282	5,327	43.37	National Green Party	Daisy Anna St. Rose	37	0.7
Castries North	12,282	5,327	43.37	Independent	Nathalbert Earl George	31	0.6
Castries South	9,554	4,810	50.35	Saint Lucia Labour Party	Ernest Hilaire	3,064	64.8
Castries South	9,554	4,810	50.35	United Workers Party	Bertrand Birch Johannes	1,635	34.6
Castries South	9,554	4,810	50.35	National Green Party	Raffaele Cantoni	33	0.7
Castries South East	15,000	7,642	50.95	Saint Lucia Labour Party (gain)	Joachim Andre Henry	3,978	52.9
Castries South East	15,000	7,642	50.95	United Workers Party	Guy Joseph	3,541	47.1
Choiseul	9,546	5,498	57.59	United Workers Party	John Bradley Felix	2,846	53.5
Choiseul	9,546	5,498	57.59	Saint Lucia Labour Party	Pauline Antoine-Prospere	2,461	46.3
Choiseul	9,546	5,498	57.59	National Green Party	Mary Gilberta St. Rose	10	0.2
Dennery North	8,705	4,628	53.16	Saint Lucia Labour Party	Shawn A. Edward	2,414	53.0
Dennery North	8,705	4,628	53.16	United Workers Party	Angelina Phera Polius	2,133	46.8
Dennery North	8,705	4,628	53.16	National Green Party	Wendel George	10	0.2
Dennery South	5,391	3,028	56.17	Saint Lucia Labour Party (gain)	Alfred Prospere	1,548	53.2
Dennery South	5,391	3,028	56.17	United Workers Party	Edmund Estephane	1,364	46.8
Gros Islet	24,418	12,292	50.34	Saint Lucia Labour Party (gain)	Kenson Joel Casimir	7,077	58.1
Gros Islet	24,418	12,292	50.34	United Workers Party	Lenard Montoute	5,024	41.3
Gros Islet	24,418	12,292	50.34	National Green Party	Andre De Caires	70	0.6
Laborie	6,870	3,426	49.87	Saint Lucia Labour Party (gain)	Alva Baptiste	2,170	64.0
Laborie	6,870	3,426	49.87	United Workers Party	Francisco Jean Pierre	1,218	36.0
Micoud North	8,314	4,121	49.57	Saint Lucia Labour Party (gain)	Jeremiah Norbert	2,283	56.5
Micoud North	8,314	4,121	49.57	United Workers Party	Gale Rigobert	1,731	42.8
Micoud North	8,314	4,121	49.57	Independent	Michael Philip St. Catherine	26	0.6
Micoud South	7,557	4,030	53.33	United Workers Party	Allen Chastanet	2,303	58.1
Micoud South	7,557	4,030	53.33	Saint Lucia Labour Party	Guibion Ferdinand	1,656	41.8
Micoud South	7,557	4,030	53.33	Independent	Melanie Fraites	6	0.2
Soufriere	8,903	5,040	56.61	Saint Lucia Labour Party (gain)	Emma Hippolyte	2,499	50.7
Soufriere	8,903	5,040	56.61	United Workers Party	Herod Adrien Stanislas	2,434	49.3
Vieux Fort North	6,995	3,601	51.48	Saint Lucia Labour Party	Moses Jean Baptiste	2,087	59.0
Vieux Fort North	6,995	3,601	51.48	United Workers Party	Vincent London	1,453	41.0
Vieux Fort South	9,611	4,570	47.55	Saint Lucia Labour Party	Kenny Anthony	3,020	67.5
Vieux Fort South	9,611	4,570	47.55	United Workers Party	Hermangild Francis	1,457	32.5
Source: Electoral Department

== Reactions ==
=== Domestic ===
SLP leader Pierre thanked the people of Saint Lucia for his party's win, promising to focus on healthcare and youth employment. PM Chastanet called Pierre to offer his congratulations. In a Facebook post, Chastanet thanked the UWP supporters and announced that the party will regroup. The NGP Deputy Leader Aaron Alexander congratulated the SLP and affirmed his party's willingness to work with them to improve the country.

=== International ===
- Grenada: Prime Minister Keith Mitchell and the opposition National Democratic Congress party both issued statements congratulating the SLP.
- Dominica: Prime Minister Roosevelt Skerrit, leader of the Dominica Labour Party, congratulated Pierre and SLP in a radio interview: "Anytime there is a difficulty in a country, people feel more comfortable with the Labour Party in office."
- Antigua and Barbuda: Prime Minister Gaston Browne sent a letter of congratulations to Pierre.

== Aftermath ==
SLP leader Philip J. Pierre was sworn in as the new Prime Minister on 28 July. The new Cabinet was sworn in on 5 August in a ceremony attended by Antiguan PM Gaston Browne. It consisted of 13 ministers, including the two independent MPs, and two parliamentary secretaries.

=== Cabinet of Ministers ===
Constituency	Political Party	Office Holder	Ministerial Office
Castries East	Saint Lucia Labour Party	Phillip J. Pierre	Prime Minister, Minister of Finance, Economic Development and the Youth Economy.
Castries South	Saint Lucia Labour Party	Ernest Hilaire	Minister for Tourism, Investment, Creative Industries, Culture and Information.
Vieux Fort North	Saint Lucia Labour Party	Moses Jn. Baptist	Minister for Health, Wellness and Elderly Affairs.
Dennery North	Saint Lucia Labour Party	Shawn A. Edward	Minister for Education, Sustainable Development, Innovation, Science, Technology and Vocational Training.
Laborie	Saint Lucia Labour Party	Alva Romanus Baptiste	Minister for External Affairs, International Trade, Civil Aviation and Diaspora Affairs.
Soufriere	Saint Lucia Labour Party	Emma Hippolyte	Minister for Commerce, Manufacturing, Business Development, Cooperatives and Consumer Affairs.
Castries South East	Saint Lucia Labour Party	Joachim Andre Henry	Minister for Equity, Social Justice and People's Empowerment.
Babonneau	Saint Lucia Labour Party	Virginia Albert-Poyotte	Minister for the Public Service, Home Affairs, Labour and Gender Affairs.
Gros Islet	Saint Lucia Labour Party	Kenson Joel Casimir	Minister for Youth Development and Sports.
Dennery South	Saint Lucia Labour Party	Alfred Prospere	Minister for Agriculture, Fisheries, Food Security and Rural Development.
Anse la Raye/Canaries	Saint Lucia Labour Party	Wayne D. Girard	Minister in the Ministry of Finance, Economic Development and Youth Economy.
Castries North	Independent	Stephenson King	Senior Minister and Minister for Infrastructure, Ports, Transport, Physical Development and Urban Renewal.
Castries Central	Independent	Richard Frederick	Minister in the Office of the Prime Minister with responsibility for Housing and Local Government.
Source: Caribbean National Weekly

=== Parliamentary Secretaries ===
Parliamentary Secretaries
Office Holder	Office
Dr. Pauline Antoine-Prospere	Parliamentary Secretary, Ministry of Education, Sustainable Development, Innovation, Science, Technology and Vocational Training.
Guibion Ferdinand	Parliamentary Secretary, Ministry of Tourism, Investment, Creative Industries, Culture and Information.
Source: Caribbean National Weekly
