= 2006 Saint Lucian general election =

- 11 December 2006

All 17 seats in the House of Assembly 9 seats needed for a majority
- Turnout: 58.46% (▲5.73pp)
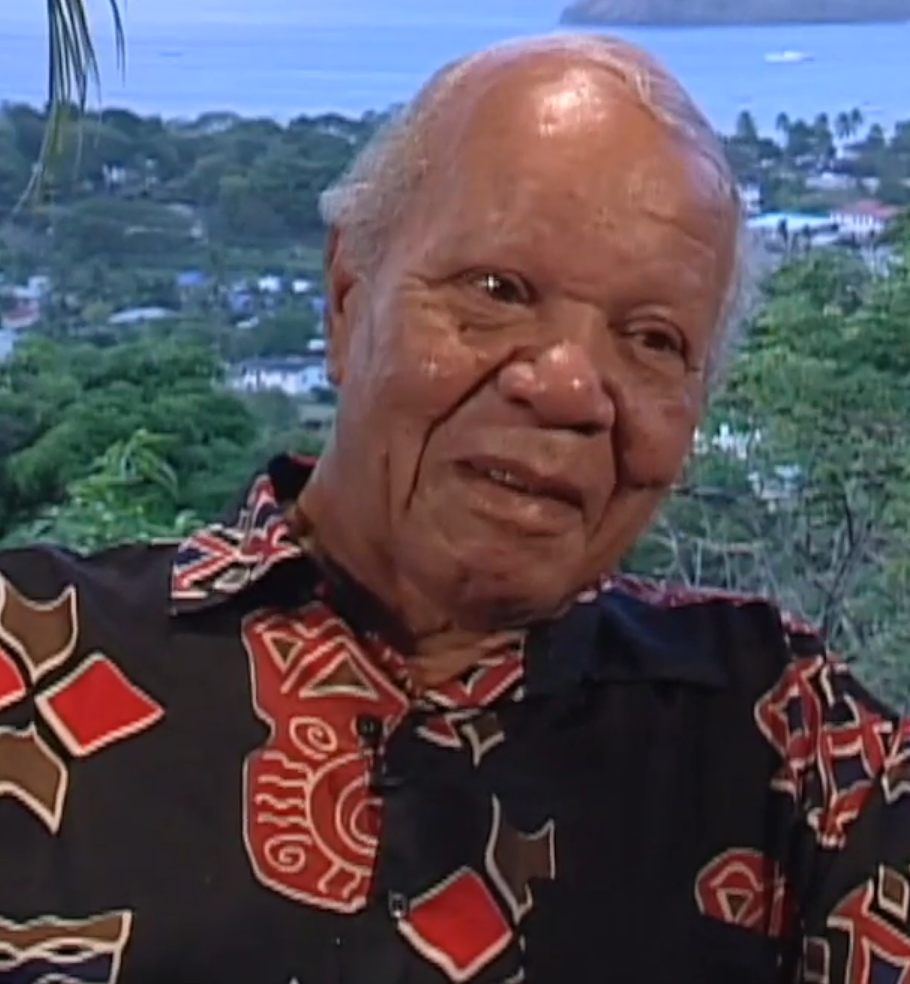

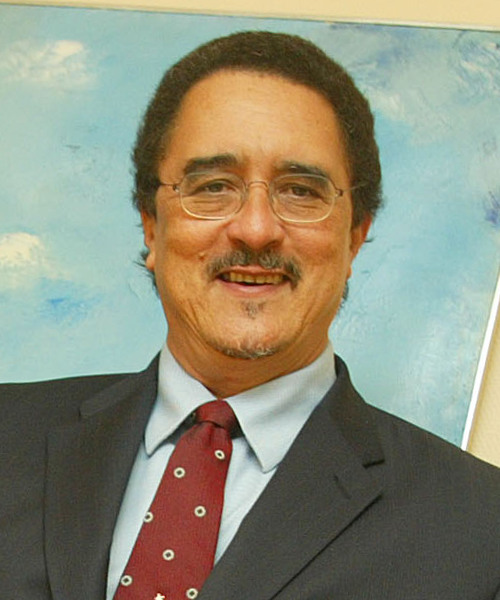
	First party	Second party
Leader	John Compton	Kenny Anthony
Party	UWP	Labour Party
Last election	37.84%, 3 seats	56.01%, 14 seats
Seats won	11	6
Seat change	▲8	▼8
Popular vote	38,894	36,604
Percentage	51.34%	48.32%
Swing	▲13.50pp	▼7.69pp
- Results by constituency.
Prime Minister before election
Kenny Anthony
Labour Party
Subsequent Prime Minister
John Compton
UWP

General elections were held in Saint Lucia on 11 December 2006. The elections were fought between the Saint Lucia Labour Party (SLP) and the United Workers Party (UWP), which between them dominated politics in Saint Lucia. The results saw the governing Saint Lucia Labour Party lose the election to the United Workers Party led by John Compton, which gained eight seats to hold an eleven to six majority.

== Background ==
The last two elections in 1997 and 2001 had seen victories for the Saint Lucia Labour Party with the previous election in 2001 seeing them win 14 seats to only 3 for the United Workers Party.

However in 2005 John Compton came out of retirement to become leader of the opposition United Workers Party again. Compton had led Saint Lucia to independence in 1979 and then been prime minister from 1982 until he resigned in 1996. Compton defeated Vaughan Lewis in an election for the leadership of the United Workers Party with Lewis later defecting from the UWP to fight the 2006 election for the Saint Lucia labour Party.

A by-election in Castries Central in March 2006 was seen as starting a long campaign for the election due in December. The by-election was won by an independent candidate Richard Frederick in a seat which the Saint Lucia Labour Party had won in the last two elections. Frederick would later join the United Workers Party and stood for the party in the general election.

== Campaign ==
2006 campaign poster for future Saint Lucian Prime Minister Stephenson King

In the campaign the United Workers Party focused on crime, which they saw as increasing, and promised to make it a priority if they were elected. Their leader Compton pledged to tackle unemployment, which they said was to blame for much of the crime in Saint Lucia. They also promised to revive the banana industry in Saint Lucia and accused the Saint Lucia Labour Party of corruption and nepotism. However the age of the United Workers Party leader John Compton, at 81, became an issue with the Saint Lucia Labour Party calling on voters to not entrust the country to him.

The governing Saint Lucia Labour Party defended their record in office and put the strong economic growth over the last few years at the centre of their campaign. They also pledged to continue tackling crime in Saint Lucia and to bring in a mandatory capital punishment for anyone convicted of murder. The Saint Lucia Labour Party received assistance in the campaign from the Prime Ministers of St Vincent and the Grenadines and Dominica who both spoke in favour of the party at rallies.

The police commissioner in Saint Lucia described the election as the most peaceful yet in Saint Lucia with election monitors from CARICOM and the Organisation of American States observing the election. Four opinion polls as the election neared showed differing results with each political party favoured by two of the polls. There was controversy over the release of a poll two days before the election which strongly favoured the Saint Lucia Labour Party, with the United Workers Party describing it as a "laughing stock" as it had been conducted back on the 25 and 26 November.

== Results ==
The results saw the United Workers Party gain a majority in the election, winning 11 of the 17 seats. While the United Workers Party won a strong majority of the seats they were only around 2,000 votes, or 3%, ahead of the Saint Lucia Labour Party. The election resulted in John Compton succeeding Kenny Anthony, and Compton became Prime Minister again at the age of 81.

Party	Votes	%	Seats	+/–
United Workers Party	38,894	51.34	11	+8
Saint Lucia Labour Party	36,604	48.32	6	–8
Independents	258	0.34	0	0
Total	75,756	100.00	17	0
Valid votes	75,756	97.77		
Invalid/blank votes	1,731	2.23		
Total votes	77,487	100.00		
Registered voters/turnout	132,545	58.46		
Source: Caribbean Elections

=== By constituency ===
The seventeen constituency results in the election were as follows.

Constituency	Winner	Party
Anse la Raye/Canaries	Keith Mondesir	United Workers Party gain
Babonneau	Ezekiel Joseph	United Workers Party gain
Castries Central	Richard Frederick	United Workers Party gain
Castries East	Philip Pierre	Saint Lucia Labour Party hold
Castries North	Stephenson King	United Workers Party gain
Castries South	Robert Lewis	Saint Lucia Labour Party hold
Castries South East	Guy Joseph	United Workers Party gain
Choiseul	Rufus Bousquet	United Workers Party gain
Dennery North	Marcus Nicholas	United Workers Party hold
Dennery South	Edmund Estephane	United Workers Party gain
Gros Islet	Lenard Montoute	United Workers Party gain
Laborie	Alva Baptiste	Saint Lucia Labour Party hold
Micoud North	John Compton	United Workers Party hold
Micoud South	Arsene James	United Workers Party hold
Soufriere	Harold Dalson	Saint Lucia Labour Party hold
Vieux Fort North	Moses Jean Baptiste	Saint Lucia Labour Party hold
Vieux Fort South	Kenny Anthony	Saint Lucia Labour Party hold
