= Marcus Nicholas =

Saint Lucian politician

Marcus Neill Nicholas is a Saint Lucian politician who represented the Dennery North constituency for the United Workers Party (UWP) in the House of Assembly of Saint Lucia. He was also the Deputy Speaker of the House of Assembly.

He has been involved in the political arena since 1997, when he lost an election to the Saint Lucia Labour Party (SLP) candidate Anthony Torrence. In the 2001 general election, Nicholas won the seat from Dennery North Constituency as a UWP candidate; in this election, the UWP only won three constituencies: Micoud North, Micoud South, and Dennery North. Nicholas subsequently became the Leader of the Opposition. In the midst of internal party disputes, the UWP announced that it had terminated his membership in the party on July 29, 2004.

Nicholas was narrowly re-elected as the UWP candidate from the Dennery North Constituency in the general election held on 11 December 2006, defeating SLP candidate Damian Grieves. Following the election, in which the UWP won a majority in the House of Assembly, UWP leader John Compton offered Nicholas a junior position in the government, and Nicholas was reportedly unhappy about this. He nevertheless became Minister in the Ministry of Agriculture, Forestry and Fisheries in Compton's government, which was sworn in on 19 December 2006.

Following Compton's death, he was one of only two UWP members of parliament (along with Rufus Bousquet) who did not receive posts in the government of Prime Minister Stephenson King, which was appointed on September 12, 2007.
