= Walter Francois =

Saint Lucian politician

Walter Francois is a Saint Lucian politician who represented the Soufrière constituency for the Saint Lucia Labour Party until 2006. Under his tenure, he oversaw the area's disaster relief efforts following Hurricane Lenny in 2006.

While serving as Minister for Planning, Development, Environment, and Housing until July 2002, Francois launched the Small and Micro Business Development Project and Rural Enterprise Development Project to support economic growth. Additionally, Francois presided over digitalization of property ownership records and infrastructure projects.

In July 2002, Prime Minister Kenny Anthony announced that Francois would resign from his cabinet after investigative journalists found that Francois had lied about possessing a PhD degree. However, Anthony argued that forcing Francois to immediately resign from the House of Assembly would disenfranchise those living in the Soufrière district. Francois ultimately chose not to run for re-election in the 2006 Saint Lucian general election, succeeded by Harold Dalson.

In 2012, the Soufrière Regional Development Foundation appointed Francois as its CEO, leading to speculation that Dalson, who had previously served as the foundation's chairman, had arranged for Francois to lead the organization, despite his lack of qualifications, in exchange for Francois' retirement from politics.
