= Joachim Henry =

Saint Lucian politician

The Right Honourable Joachim Henry MP
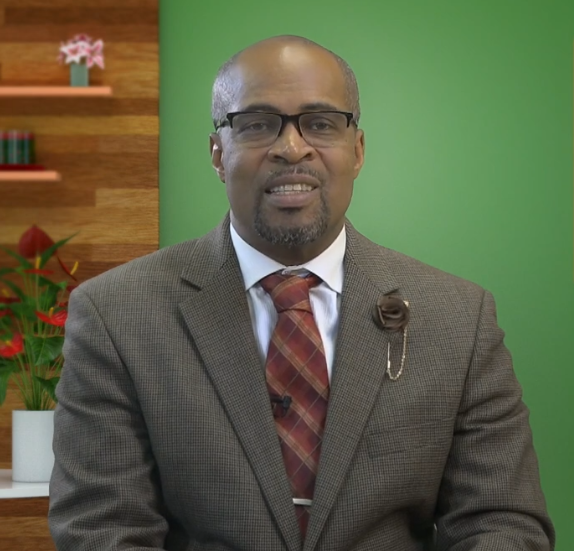
- Henry in 2021

Member of Parliament for Castries South East
- Assuming office 2021
- Succeeding: Guy Joseph

Member of the Senate
- In office 2016–2020

Minister for Equity, Social Justice and Empowerment
- Incumbent
- Assumed office 5 August 2021

Personal details
- Born: Joachim Andre Henry
- Party: Saint Lucia Labour Party

Joachim Andre Henry is a Saint Lucian politician and Minister for Equity, Social Justice and Empowerment.

== Political career ==
He was elected to represent Castries South East constituency in the House of Assembly in the 2021 general election. He is a member of the Saint Lucia Labour Party. From 2016 to 2020, he served in the Senate as leader of opposition business.

Henry unsuccessfully contested the Castries South East seat in the 2016 general election.

== Personal life ==
Henry is a member of the Seventh-day Adventist Church.
