= Angelina Phera Polius =

Saint Lucian politician

Member of the Senate
- Incumbent
- Assumed office 15 September 2020

Personal details
- Born: Angelina Phera Polius
- Party: United Workers Party (Saint Lucia)
- Education: University of the West Indies and University of Sheffield

Angelina Phera Polius is a Saint Lucian politician, senator in the Upper house and former veteran educator. Polius contested the 2021 Saint Lucia General Election as a United Workers Party Candidate for the Dennery North Constituency. She was unsuccessful against the incumbent Shawn Edward.

== Education ==
Polius holds a Bachelor's degree in Education with First Class Honours from the University of the West Indies. She also obtained a master's degree in New Literacies from the University of Sheffield.

== Political career ==
Polius became a senator on 15 September 2020 as she replaced her predecessor Timothy Mangal who resigned. She became a United Workers Party Senator once again after the 2021 Saint Lucia General Election since she was unable to claim a seat in the House of Assembly.
