= Minister of Foreign Affairs (Saint Lucia) =

This is a list of foreign ministers of Saint Lucia.

- 1979: John Compton
- 1979–1981: George Odlum
- 1981–1982: Peter Josie
- 1982–1987: John Compton
- 1987–1992: Neville Cenac
- 1992–1996: George Mallet
- 1996–1997: Vaughan Lewis
- 1997–2001: George Odlum
- 2001–2004: Julian Hunte
- 2004–2006: Petrus Compton
- 2006–2007: Rufus Bousquet
- 2007–2009: Stephenson King
- 2009–2011: Rufus Bousquet
- 2011–2016: Alva Baptiste
- 2016–2021: Allen Chastanet
- 2021–present: Alva Baptiste

== Sources ==
- Rulers.org – Foreign ministers S–Z
