= Richard Frederick =

Saint Lucian lawyer and politician

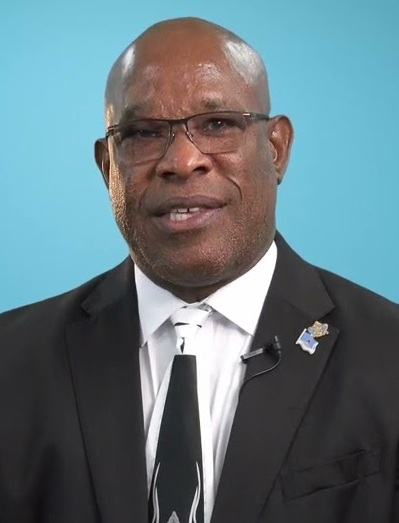
- Frederick in 2022

Member, House of Assembly of Saint Lucia from Castries Central
- Incumbent
- Assumed office 2021
- Preceded by: Sarah Flood-Beaubrun
- In office 9 January 2007 – 19 May 2016
- Preceded by: Sarah Flood-Beaubrun
- Succeeded by: Sarah Flood-Beaubrun

Minister in the Office of the Prime Minister with Responsibility for Housing and Local Government
- Incumbent
- Assumed office 5 August 2021

Personal details
- Born: 6 August 1965 (age 61)
- Party: Independent _{(2014–present)}, United Workers Party _{(2006–2014)}, Independent _{(2006)}
- Education: Saint Mary's College
- Occupation: Lawyer

Richard Frederick (born 6 August 1965) is a Saint Lucian lawyer and politician. He is the Minister in the Office of the Prime Minister with Responsibility for Housing and Local Government. Fredrick made his debut in the 2021 Saint Lucian General Election, earning his seat for the Castries Central Constituency as an Independent candidate in the House of Assembly. He previously served in parliament from 2006 to 2016, and he was Minister for Physical Planning, Housing, Urban Renewal and Local Government.

== Early life ==
Born on 6 August 1965, Richard Frederick is the tenth of twelve children and the last of five boys. Raised in Micoud on the southeast coast of Saint Lucia, his parents—who were farmers by profession—worked to educate him and his siblings.

Frederick attended St. Mary's College from 1977 to 1982, at which time he moved to the island's capital, Castries, to be closer to school. He subsequently studied law in the UK and became a barrister. He became a constant fixture on radio, first with the popular Avocat En hall La, then hosting his Can I Help You? legal advice programme on HTS Radio, a show continuing despite his parliamentary status.

== Political career ==
Frederick was elected to the Castries Central constituency as an independent Member of Parliament, having won the by-election held on 13 March 2006, triggered by the resignation of Saint Lucia Labour Party's MP Sarah Flood-Beaubrun. Subsequently endorsed by the United Workers Party (UWP), he was re-elected for the UWP in the December 2006 general election.

He was sworn in as Minister for Housing, Urban Renewal and Local Government in the government of Prime Minister John Compton on 19 December 2006.

Following Prime Minister Compton's death, Frederick's portfolio was expanded to include Urban Renewal and Local Government in the 12 September 2007, cabinet reshuffle under new Prime Minister Stephenson King. He subsequently failed in his bid to become deputy leader of the United Workers Party in 2008.

A powerful criminal attorney, he has amassed millions and was embroiled in a customs scandal, which had to do with him allegedly underpaying customs duties for clearing personal vehicles through Customs. An investigation ensued.

In 2007, he was taken into custody by police, acting on instructions from Customs Controller Terrance Leonard, for alleged tax evasion and under-invoicing on the purchase of cars from the United States. No charges have since been laid. Frederick has enjoined the Attorney General in a suit he has brought related to this incident. He won the lawsuit, which was pursued with his brother, who himself was arrested for the same cause, and they were jointly awarded $50,000 for unlawful arrest. Frederick resigned as a cabinet minister in September 2011, following a Wikileak-related scandal regarding the withdrawal by the U.S. State Department of his diplomatic visa for entry in the United States. Mr. Frederick's diplomatic visa being revoked was in relation to US $25 million. If there exist reports of Frederick's considerable wealth and attacks regarding the acquisition of his assets, none are proven or have been found with merit yet. However, it remains a fact that he was one of the most, if not the most, expensive criminal defense lawyer on the island.

He was reelected in his constituency in the 2011 general elections, but his party was defeated. On 17 August 2014, Frederick was expelled from the United Workers Party, after he blatantly refused to work with Allen Chastanet who had secured leadership of the United Workers Party. Although he was given an ultimatum, he refused. He declined to contest the 2016 general election.

Frederick was an independent Labour candidate in the 2021 general election, to represent Castries Central in Parliament. He defeated the incumbent, Sarah Flood-Beaubrun, by 605 votes.
