= Ezechiel Joseph =

Saint Lucian politician

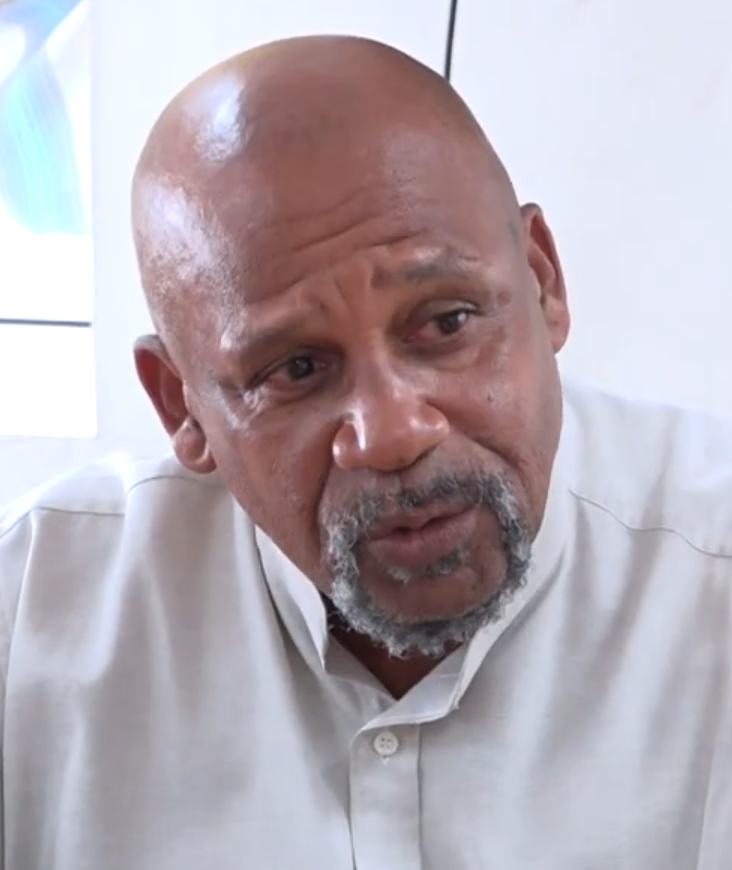
- Joseph in 2021

Member of Parliament for Babonneau
- In office 2006–2011
- Preceded by: Virginia Albert-Poyotte
- In office 6 June 2016 – 26 July 2021

Member of the Senate
- In office 12 January 2012 – 31 December 2015

Minister for Agriculture, Forestry and Fisheries
- In office 2006–2011

Minister of Agriculture, Fisheries, Physical Planning, Natural Resources and Co-operatives
- In office 6 June 2016 – 26 July 2021

Personal details
- Born: Ezechiel Joseph
- Party: United Workers Party (Saint Lucia)

Ezechiel Joseph is a Saint Lucian politician and former representative for the constituency of Babonneau and senator, for the United Workers Party in the House of Assembly. Joseph served as the Minister of Agriculture, Fisheries, Physical Planning, Natural Resources and Co-operatives in his 2016 - 2021 tenure. Joseph lost his seat in the 2021 Saint Lucian General Election dubbed a landslide victory for the Saint Lucia Labour Party.

== Political career ==
Joseph represented the constituency of Babonneau for the United Workers Party from 2006 to 2011 and from 2016 to 2021. Joseph won the seat at the general election held on 11 December 2006. In the government of Prime Minister John Compton, sworn in on 19 December 2006, he was appointed Minister for Agriculture, Forestry and Fisheries. Joseph lost the seat at the general election held on 28 November 2011. He was sworn in as an opposition member of the Senate on 5 January 2012. He resigned from the Senate effective 31 December 2015. Joseph regained the Babonneau seat in the general election held on 6 June 2016 and served again as Minister for Agriculture. He was lost the seat again in the 2021 general election.
