= Arsene James =

Saint Lucian politician

Arsene Vigil James (30 October 1944 – 29 July 2018) was a Saint Lucian politician and former Leader of the Opposition. He represented the Micoud South constituency for the United Workers' Party. James became Leader of the Parliamentary Opposition when UWP leader Morella Joseph did not win her seat, in the December 2001 elections.

He served as the Minister for Education and Culture under the government of Prime Minister John Compton from 2006 to 2011.

He died on July 29, 2018.

== See also ==
- United Workers' Party (Saint Lucia)
- Politics of Saint Lucia
