= Lisa Jawahir =

Saint Lucian politician

MP for Castries South East
- Incumbent
- Assumed office 2025

Personal details
- Party: Saint Lucia Labour Party

Lisa Cassandra Jawahir is a Saint Lucian politician.

== Biography ==
In 2020, Jawahir was appointed to the Senate of Saint Lucia. Jawahir was elected to the House of Assembly of Saint Lucia in Castries South East at the 2025 Saint Lucian general election. She was appointed agriculture minister.
