= Micoud, Saint Lucia =

Micoud
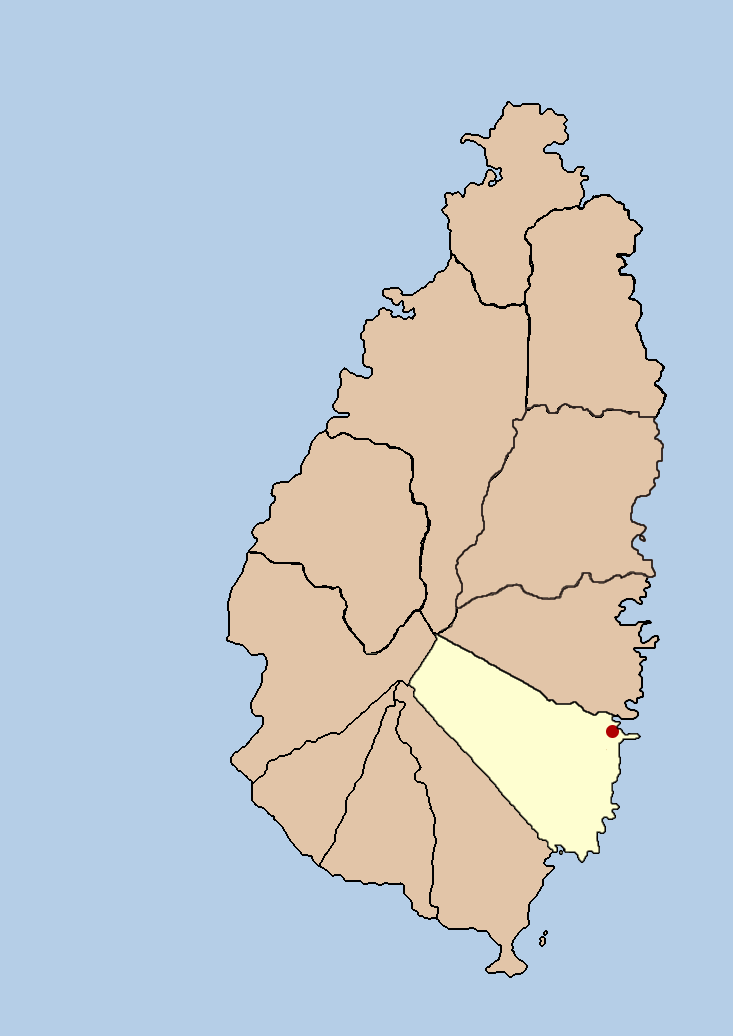
- Political map of St Lucia showing location of Micoud
- Coordinates: 13°49′08″N 60°54′00″W
- Country: Saint Lucia
- District: Micoud District
- Founded: 18th Century
- Founder: The French
- Named for: Baron de Micoud, governor of Saint Lucia

Government
  - Governing body: Micoud Village Council
- Elevation: 1 m (3.3 ft)

Population (2005)
  - Total: 16,620 (Micoud District)
- Time zone: UTC-4 (Eastern Caribbean Time Zone (ECT))
- Area code: 758

Micoud is a village of around 2,700 inhabitants on the south-east coast of Saint Lucia in the Micoud District. It was named after Baron de Micoud, who was the French governor of Saint Lucia in the 18th century. More recently it has been known as the home town and constituency seat of Sir John Compton, who was the premier of Saint Lucia from 1967 to 1979, then prime minister in 1979, 1982 to 1996, and 2006 to 2007.

== See also ==
- Micoud District
- List of cities in Saint Lucia
