= Harold Dalson =

Saint Lucian politician

Harold Dalsan is a Saint Lucian politician who represents the constituency of Soufrière for the Saint Lucia Labour Party. Dalsan won the seat at the general election held on 11 December 2006. Dalsan became Minister for Social Transformation and Local Government in 2011.

== See also ==
- Politics of Saint Lucia
