= Wayne Girard =

Saint Lucian politician

The Honourable Wayne Girard MP
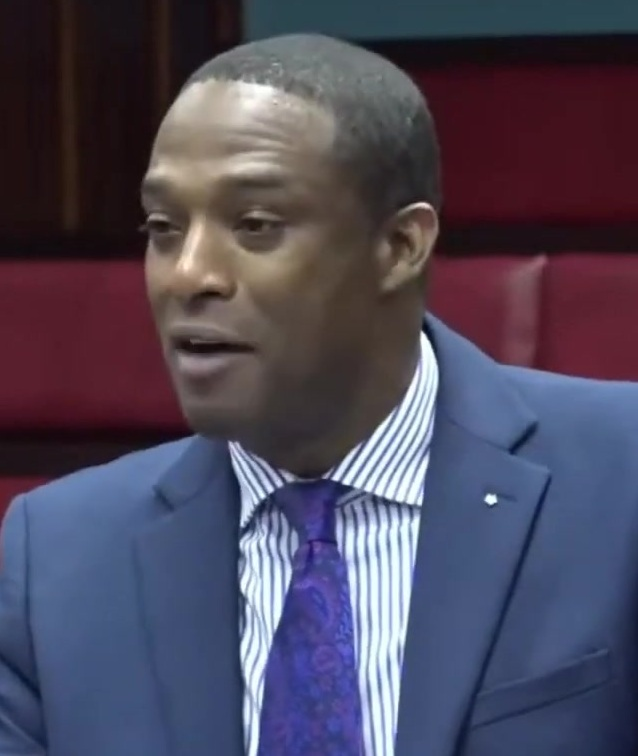

Member of Parliament for Anse la Raye-Canaries
- Assuming office 26 July 2021
- Succeeding: Dominic Fedee

Minister in the Ministry of Finance, Economic Development and Youth Economy
- Incumbent
- Assumed office 5 August 2021

Personal details
- Born: Wayne D. Girard
- Party: Saint Lucia Labour Party

Wayne Girard is a Saint Lucian politician. Girard serves as the Minister in the Ministry of Finance, Economic Development and Youth Economy. He also represents the constituency of Anse la Raye-Canaries in the House of Assembly.

He was the endorsed Saint Lucia Labour Party candidate for the constituency of Anse la Raye-Canaries. Girard won the parliamentary elections after polling 51.6% of the votes to secure victory for the Saint Lucia Labour Party in the 2021 Saint Lucian General Election. The SLP secured a landslide victory over the United Workers Party.
