= Jeremiah Norbert =

Saint Lucian politician

The Right Honourable Jeremiah Norbert MP
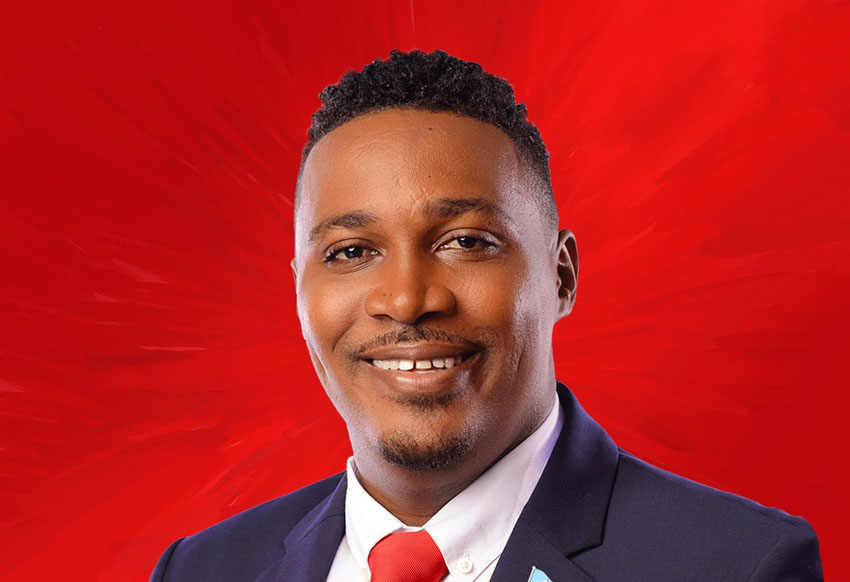

Member of Parliament for Micoud North
- Assuming office 2021
- Succeeding: Gale Rigobert

Deputy Speaker of The Lower House
- Incumbent
- Assumed office 5 August 2021

Personal details
- Born: Jeremiah Norbert
- Party: Saint Lucia Labour Party
- Education: University of the West Indies Open Campus

Jeremiah Norbert is a Saint Lucian politician, Deputy Speaker of The Lower House and former Police Officer. Norbert won his seat in the 2021 general election. The Micoud North seat was deemed a United Workers Party stronghold but Norbert is now the representative for Micoud North in the House of Assembly elected for the Saint Lucia Labour Party.

== Post career ==
Norbert served in the Royal Saint Lucia Police Force for 10 Years. Norbert was the Best Recruit in his Graduating Class of 2011.

== Education ==
Norbert is pursuing studies at the University of the West Indies Open Campus in a Bachelor's program in Political Science.
