= Emma Hippolyte =

Saint Lucian politician

The Right Honourable, Order of the British Empire Emma Hippolyte MP, OBE
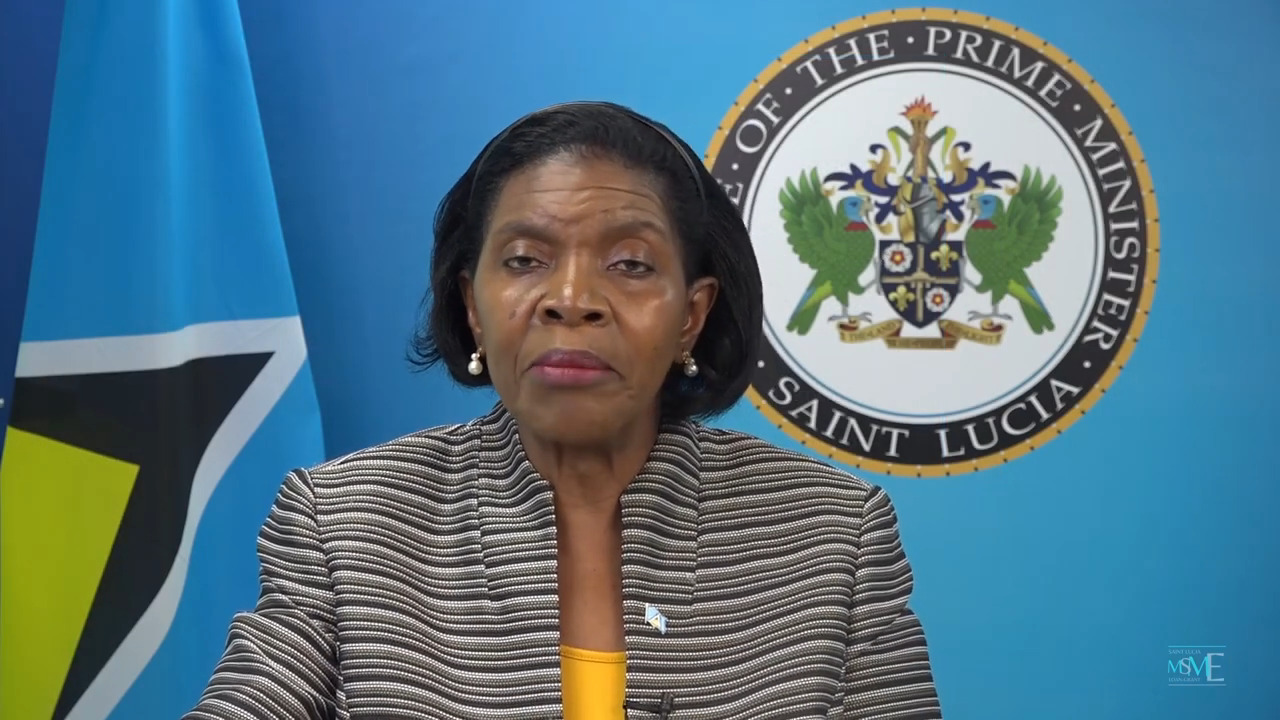

Member of Parliament for Soufriere–Fond St. Jacques
- Assuming office 2021
- Succeeding: Herod Stanislaus

Minister for Commerce, Business Development, Investment, and Consumer Affairs
- In office 2011–2016

Member of Parliament for Gros Islet
- In office 2011–2016
- Preceded by: Lenard Montoute
- Succeeded by: Lenard Montoute

Member of the Senate
- In office 1987–20

Minister for Commerce, Manufacturing, Business Development, Cooperatives and Consumer Affairs
- Incumbent
- Assumed office 5 August 2021

Personal details
- Born: 1950 September 23rd Soufriere, Saint Lucia
- Party: Saint Lucia Labour Party
- Occupation: Accountant

Emma Hippolyte, OBE is a Saint Lucian politician and Minister for Commerce, Manufacturing, Business Development, Cooperatives and Consumer Affairs. Hippolyte serves as the representative for Soufriere-Fond St. Jacques as a Member of Parliament. Hippolyte was a member of the Saint Lucian Senate from 2007 to 2011. She won the Soufriere-Fond St. Jacques seat in the 2021 general election. She lost the Gros Islet seat in the 2016 general election.

Hippolyte was awarded OBE in 2006 for services to the government and public service.

In 2017 she urged a probe into corned beef imported from Brazil.

== Political career ==
=== Representation of Gros Islet ===
Hippolyte represented Gros Islet constituency for the Saint Lucia Labour Party from 2011 to 2016. She was the Minister for Commerce, Business Development, Investment and Consumer Affairs. She won her seat in the 2011 general election.
