= Alva Baptiste =

Saint Lucian politician

The Right Honourable Alva Baptiste MP
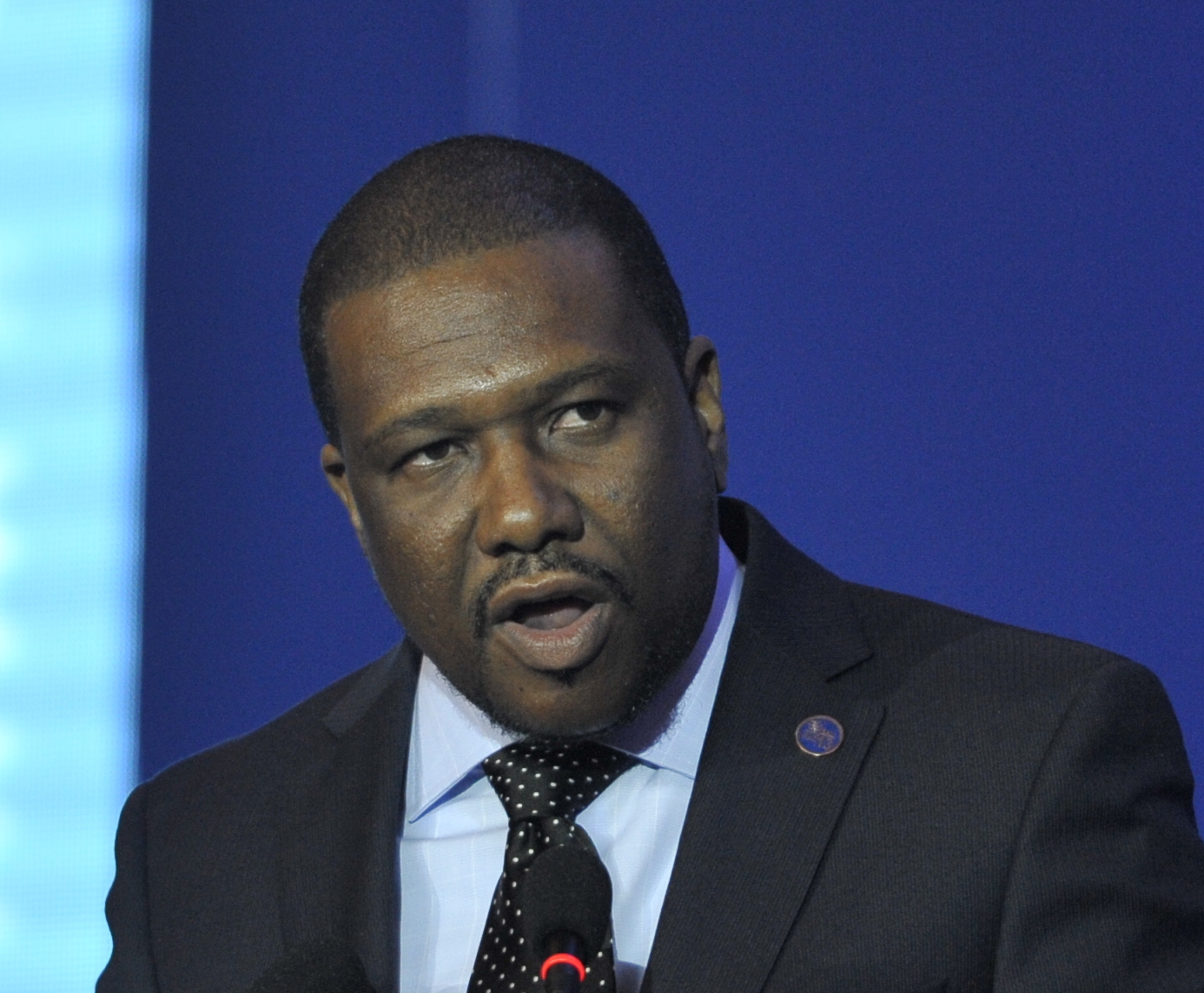
- Alva Baptiste at a WTO conference in Bali, December 2013

14th and 16th Minister for External Affairs
- Incumbent
- Assumed office 5 August 2021
- Prime Minister: Philip J. Pierre
- Preceded by: Allen Chastanet
- In office 30 November 2011 – 7 June 2016
- Prime Minister: Kenny Anthony
- Preceded by: Rufus Bousquet
- Succeeded by: Allen Chastanet

Member of Parliament for Laborie
- Incumbent
- Assumed office 11 December 2006

Personal details
- Born: Alva Romanus Baptiste
- Party: Saint Lucia Labour Party

Alva Romanus Baptiste is a Saint Lucian politician who represents the constituency of Laborie for the Saint Lucia Labour Party. Baptiste won the seat at the general election held on 11 December 2006. He also won convincingly in the 2011, 2016 and 2021 general elections. He is currently the Minister for External Affairs, International Trade, Civil Aviation and Diaspora Affairs.
