= Stephenson King =

Former Prime minister of Saint Lucia

The Honourable Stephenson King
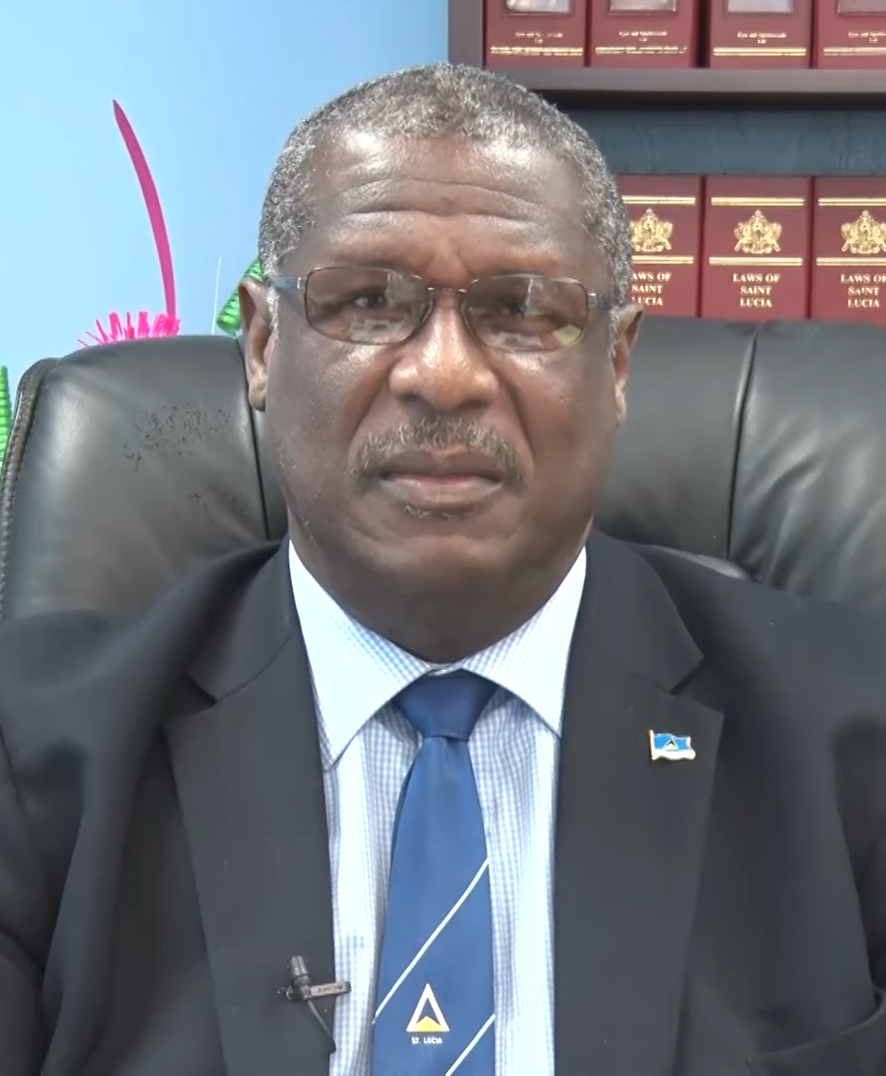

7th Prime Minister of Saint Lucia
- In office 1 May 2007 – 30 November 2011; Acting: 1 May 2007 – 9 September 2007
- Monarch: Elizabeth II
- Governor General: Pearlette Louisy
- Deputy: Lenard Montoute
- Preceded by: John Compton
- Succeeded by: Kenny Anthony

Senior Minister and Minister for Infrastructure, Ports, Transport, Physical Development, and Urban Renewal
- Incumbent
- Assumed office 5 August 2021
- Prime Minister: Philip Pierre

Personal details
- Born: 13 November 1958 (age 68) Castries, Saint Lucia
- Party: Independent (7 July 2021 – present)
- Other political affiliations: UWP (1982 – 7 July 2021)
- Spouse: Rosella Nestor
- Children: Ashelle King

Stephenson King (born 13 November 1958) is the former Prime Minister of Saint Lucia. He is the Senior Minister and Minister for Infrastructure, Ports, Transport, Physical Development, and Urban Renewal. King was the former candidate for the United Workers Party (UWP). He now represents the constituency of Castries North as an independent candidate as of July 2021, after resigning from the UWP.

== Early life and education ==
He is the son of Grafton King; a renowned seaman, from Canouan, St.Vincent, and Marie Bernadette Satney, a seamstress from the village of Choiseul. He attended the Methodist Infant and Primary Schools for his early infant and primary schooling. Later, he was admitted to the Seventh Day Adventist Academy, where he continued his secondary education.

== Pre-politics career ==
Following the completion of his secondary education, King gained employment at the former St. Lucia Co-operative Bank Ltd (now 1st National Bank of St Lucia), where he served for two and a half years. He resigned in 1981 to accept an offer from the law firm of Floissac and Giraudy, where he served for seven years as Accountant, Trade Marks Clerk/Paralegal.

== Political career ==
In 1981 following the inaugural youth conference of the United Workers Party, King was elected the President of the party's youth arm. In 1982 after having actively participated in the election campaign of that year he was appointed a City Councilor of the Castries City Council and a board member of the St. Lucia Housing Authority, serving in both capacities for 5 years. During that period he also formed and became the founding President of the Rotaract Club of Saint Lucia, resigning in 1987 when he entered elective politics.

Stephenson entered the political fray on the island when he was nominated as the candidate for the Castries North-East Constituency. In the first election on 6 April 1987 he got 2,411 votes against former prime minister Michael Pilgrim of the St Lucia Labour Party (1772 votes) and Oswald Augustin of the Progressive Labour Party (846 votes). In the second (snap) election on 30 April 1987 he polled 2,731 votes to Pilgrim's 2,549 votes and Augustin's 375 votes. He was then appointed as a Cabinet Minister, serving as the Minister for Community Development, Social Affairs, Youth, Sports, and local Government.

He faced the electorate again in 1992 against lawyer Wilkie Larcher of the St Lucia Labour Party. He was able to register a bigger victory this time polling 3,511 to Larcher's 2,009. Following the election he was appointed to the Cabinet as the Minister for Health, Local Government, Information and Broadcasting.

He would succumb in the tumultuous defeat of the United Worker's Party in the 1997 election where he was defeated by George Odlum on a St Lucia Labour Party ticket. The results of the election show Odlum overcoming the incumbent 3960 to 2604, the lowest number of votes King would ever gain in an election. He took a nine-year sabbatical from elective politics although remaining chairman of the party for most of this period.

Following a short-lived struggle between himself and Cybelle Cenac for that right King received the endorsement of the United Workers Party in 2006 to contest the general elections as the candidate for Castries North. He would defeat the sitting Minister of Agriculture at the polls, which also saw his United Worker's Party return to office. The UWP won a majority of seats in the 2006 election, and a new government under Compton was sworn in on 19 December 2006. King was named Minister for Health and Labour Relations.

Compton's illness in May 2007 prompted King to be named acting prime minister. In a cabinet reshuffle in early June 2007, he became Minister of Finance (inclusive of International Financial Services), External Affairs, Home Affairs, National Security, Labor, Information and Broadcasting. In an ironic twist, King assumed the mantle while a few months earlier he had been seen as a Lewis loyalist in the party's leadership race. Compton died on 7 September 2007, and King announced his death on 8 September. King was subsequently sworn in as prime minister by Governor-General Pearlette Louisy on 9 September. The ten UWP members of the House of Assembly agreed on King's designation as prime minister. King reshuffled the cabinet on 12 September. In addition to Prime Ministership, he assumed the roles of External Affairs, Home Affairs and National Security. King also held the modified portfolio of Minister of Finance (including International Financial Services), Economic Affairs, Economic Planning and National Development. Earlier in 2008 Prime Minister King came under pressure, first from leader of the opposition Dr. Kenny Anthony and then from his own parliamentary wing, to dismiss Economic Planning Minister Ausbert D'Auvergne. He eventually acquiesced and returned Choiseul representative Rufus Bousquet to his cabinet, defusing the impasse.

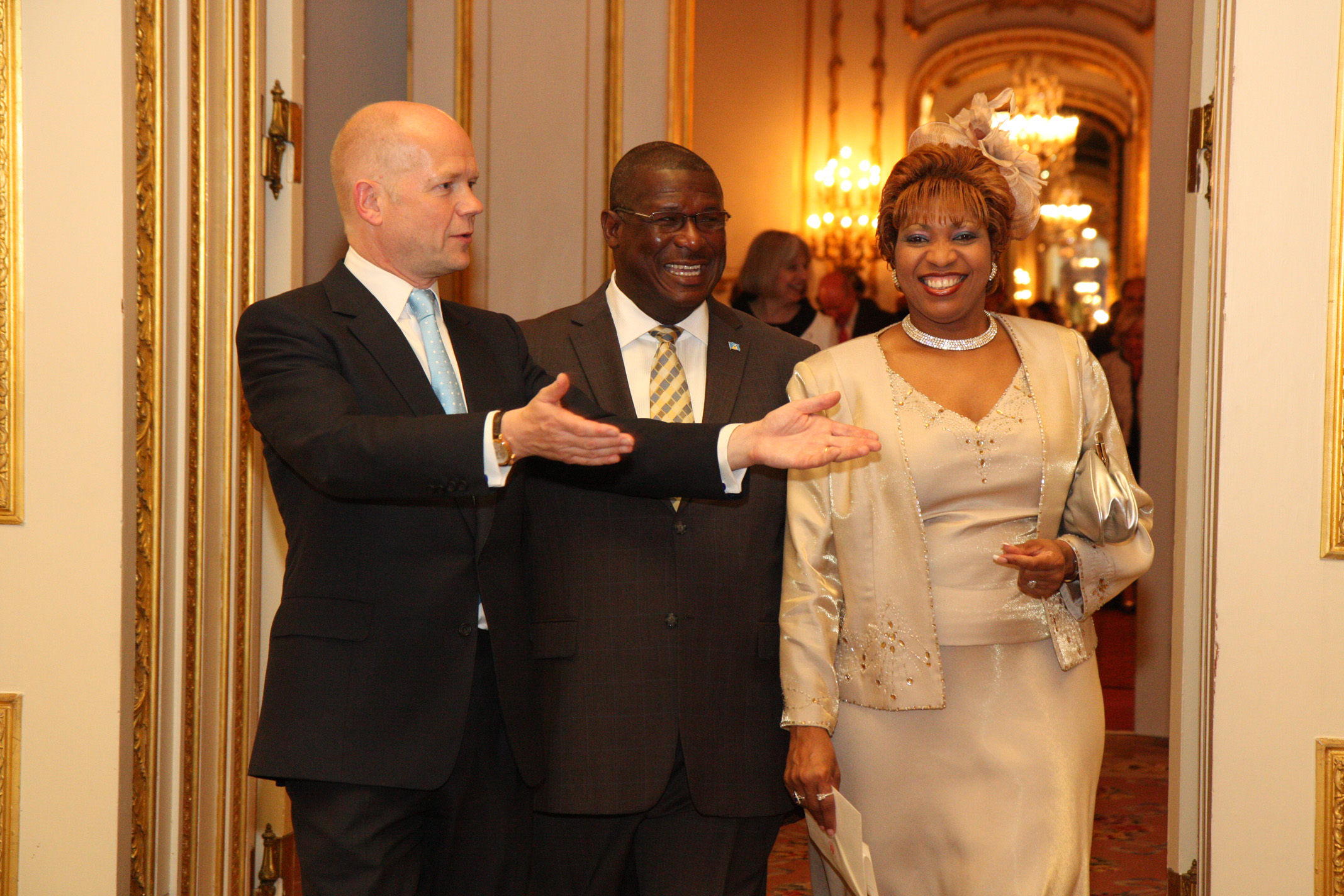
Stephenson King and his wife Rosella being welcomed by William Hague.

King also dismissed the representative of Central Castries and Minister of Housing Richard Frederick from cabinet in 2011, following a scandal created by the revocation of his visitors and diplomatic visas by the United States Government.

The King administration suffered defeat in the 2011 general elections on 28 November 2011, obtaining only 6 out of 17 seats in Parliament. He was subsequently Leader of the Parliamentary Opposition from November 2011 to January 2014.

=== Withdrawal from the United Workers Party ===
King was at the center of media and public attention in June 2021 as rumors went on that he was going to leave the United Workers Party. King remained silent for weeks before breaking his silence in a dubbed "Address to the Nation"; this address was televised live on the Saint Lucia Choice Media Network and Liberty FM Radio. In his address King stated that he will not contest the 2021 general election on a UWP ticket but as an independent candidate. Prime Minister Allen Chastanet accepted King's resignation on 8 July 2021. King would be replaced the day after on 9 July 2021 by President of the Saint Lucia Senate Jeannine Giraudy-McIntyre.

King went on to justify his withdrawal in his "Address to The Nation", stating:

"Never have I been so repulsed by the blatant disrespect and callous contempt in which so many ordinary people have been held by those who now hold political office. Today, I find myself unable to recognise the founding principles of my party in the government, that I am supposedly a part of, and say 'Sa pa Flambeau'.

In all good conscience I cannot go to the people and ask them to endorse for another five years, what has just preceded us and to repose the leadership of this country, in the same group of people in some mistaken belief that it will be alright in the morning.

So after deep and profound soul searching, consultations and prayers, and after having spent so much time, indeed for the past few years, attempting to share my wisdom with my colleagues to pursue a different brand of politics, I have reached the inevitable and painful conclusion that I can no longer be part of an organisation that I can hardly recognise."

—

King would go on to receive public backlash. Mary Francis, an attorney at law, commented "There is a price to pay for treachery and time will tell", referencing to King's upcoming decision. Some members of the public took to social media to express their disappointment and disagreement, whilst others agreed with the decision.

King won re-election as an independent in the 2021 Saint Lucian general election, defeating his UWP opponent Jeannine Giraudy-McIntyre with 69.5% of the vote.

== Personal life ==
King married Rosella Nestor, his longtime partner in a wedding ceremony in Miami on Saturday 29 November 2008.

== See also ==
- List of prime ministers of Saint Lucia
- United Workers Party

Political offices
Preceded by John Compton	Prime Minister of Saint Lucia; 2007–2011	Succeeded by Kenny Anthony
