= Alfred Prospere =

Saint Lucian politician

The Right Honourable Alfred Prospere MP
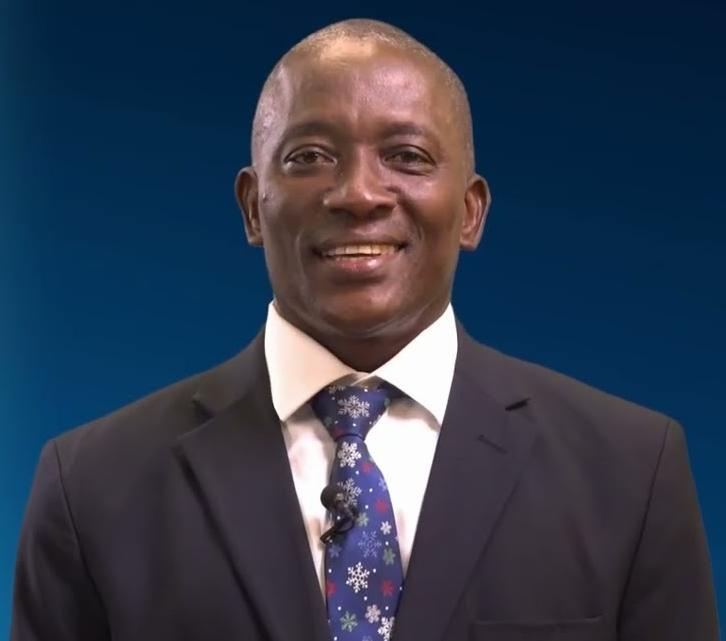

Member of Parliament for Dennery South
- Assuming office 26 July 2021
- Succeeding: Edmund Estephane

Minister for Agriculture, Fisheries, Food Security and Rural Development
- Incumbent
- Assumed office 5 August 2021

Personal details
- Born: Alfred Prosper
- Party: Saint Lucia Labour Party

Alfred Prospere is a Saint Lucian politician and retired Chief Forestry Officer. Prospere serves as the Minister for Agriculture, Fisheries, Food Security and Rural Development. He also represents the Dennery South constituency in the House of Assembly.

He was the endorsed Saint Lucia Labour Party candidate for the constituency of Dennery South. Prospere won the parliamentary elections by a slim margin of 184 votes over incumbent Edmund Estaphane, polling 53.2% of the ballots cast, to secure victory for the Saint Lucia Labour Party in the 2021 Saint Lucian General Election. The SLP secured a landslide victory over the United Workers Party.
