= Edmund Estephane =

Saint Lucian politician for United Workers Party

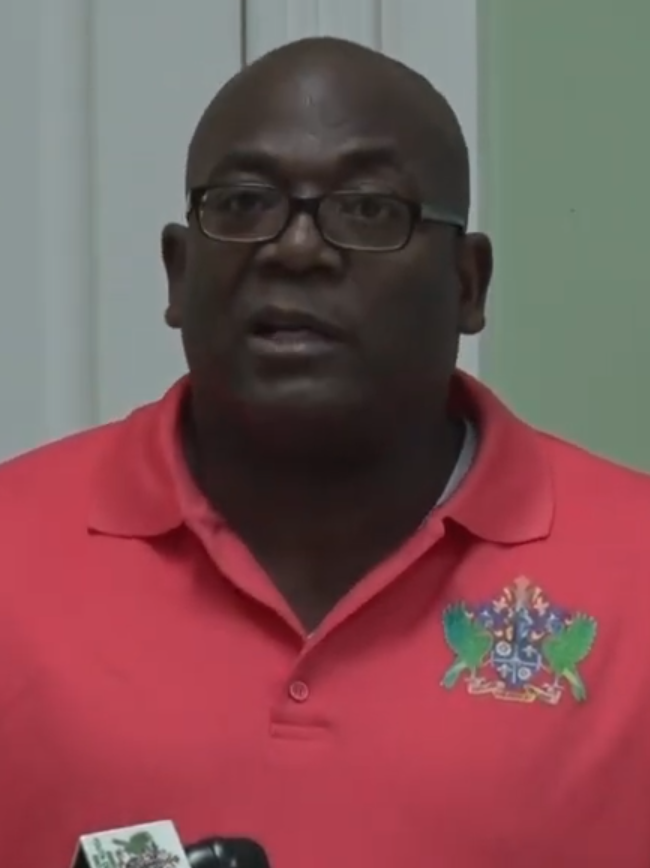
- Estephane in 2021

Personal information
- Born: 16 November 1968 (age 57)

Sport
- Sport: Track and field

Edmund Estephane (born 16 November 1968) is a Saint Lucian politician who represented the constituency of Dennery South for the United Workers Party. He is also a former sprinter who competed at the World Championships.

Estephane won his seat at the general election held on 11 December 2006. In the government of Prime Minister John Compton, sworn in on 19 December 2006, Estephane was named Minister of the Ministry of Trade, Industry and Commerce. In early June 2007, he became Minister of Health, and in the next cabinet reshuffle on September 12, 2007, following Compton's death, he became Minister for Labour, Information and Broadcasting. Edmund Estaphane lost his palimentary seat to Saint Lucia Labour Party candidate Alfred Prospere in the 2021 Saint Lucia General Election.
