= Rufus Bousquet =

Saint Lucian politician

Rufus George Bousquet (born 28 November 1958) is a Saint Lucian politician who formerly represented the constituency of Choiseul for the United Workers Party. Bousquet last won the seat at the general election held on 11 December 2006 but lost it to Lorne Theophilus in the November 2011 General Elections. Prior to 2000 his name was Bruce Tucker or, from 1989, Joseph Michael Bousquet.

== Early life ==
He was born in St Lucia and educated until 1975 at St Mary's College. From 1989 until his first election to Parliament in 1992 to represent Choiseul, he was Managing Direction of a holiday real estate company.

== Career ==
Bousquet served in the government under Prime Minister John Compton as Minister for Financial Services and the National Development Corporation before being dismissed in 1995. Following the UWP victory in December 2006, he became Minister for External Affairs, International Financial Services, Information and Broadcasting in Compton's new government, sworn in on 19 December.

On May 1, 2007, he signed an agreement with Taiwanese foreign minister James C. F. Huang restoring diplomatic relations between the two countries at the expense of St. Lucia's relations with the People's Republic of China. In early June 2007 Bousquet was dismissed from the government by Compton; some speculation attributed the dismissal to the restoration of relations with Taiwan.

Bousquet expressed his readiness to seek the UWP leadership at its planned convention in October 2007. Following Compton's death on September 7, 2007, reports indicated that Bousquet only supported the designation of Acting Prime Minister Stephenson King as Prime Minister on the condition that he be brought back into the cabinet, but he was not included in it when a cabinet reshuffle occurred on September 12.

On June 6, 2008, having restored a good relationship with the Prime Minister and the cabinet, The Honorable Rufus Bousquet was sworn in as Minister for Industry, Trade, Commerce, Investment and Consumer Affairs () In February 2009, the Prime Minister gave up his position as Minister of Foreign Affairs and restored Bousquet to the position. In the November 28, 2011 General Elections he obtained a total of 2756 votes whereas his opponent, Lorne Theophilus, obtained 2810 of the constituent's votes thus ending his run as parliamentary representative for Choiseul.
