= Gale Rigobert =

Saint Lucian politician

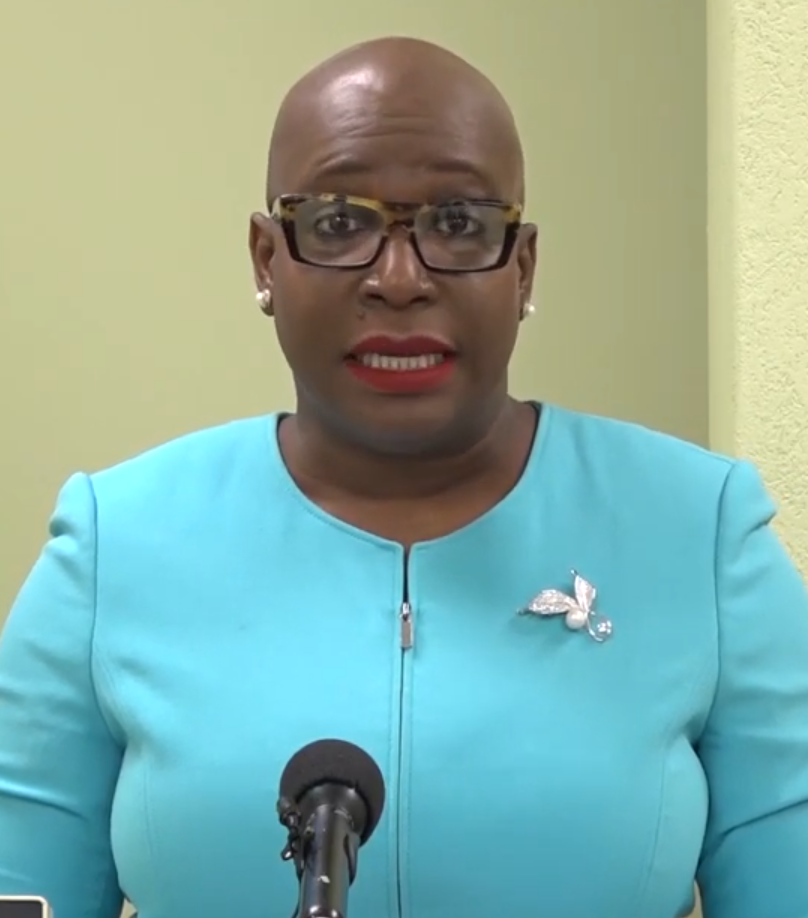
Rigobert in 2021

Gale Tracy Christiane Rigobert is a Saint Lucian politician, former Minister for Education, Innovation, Gender Relations and Sustainable Development. She is the former representative for Micoud North constituency in the House of Assembly.

== Biography ==
She served as deputy political leader of the United Workers Party. She won her seat in the 2011 general election. Rigobert was a member of the Saint Lucian Senate. She is a former lecturer at the University of the West Indies. On 1 February 2014, she became Leader of the Parliamentary Opposition for the United Workers Party. In June 2016, she was appointed Minister of Education, Innovation, Gender Relations and Sustainable Development.

When Minister for Education, Innovation, Gender Relations, and Sustainable Development, she assumed her seat as the Co-Chair of the Governing Board of the Risk-informed Early Action Partnership (REAP). The REAP brings together a range of stakeholders across the climate, humanitarian, and development communities with the aim of making 1 billion people safer from disaster by 2025.

Rigobert is the author of the book – “Bridging the Digital Divide? Prospects for Caribbean Development in the New Techno-economic Paradigm”.

In October 2023, she assumed the role of Academic Dean at the University of St. Martin.
