= Bradley Felix =

Saint Lucian politician

The Right Honourable Bradley Felix MP
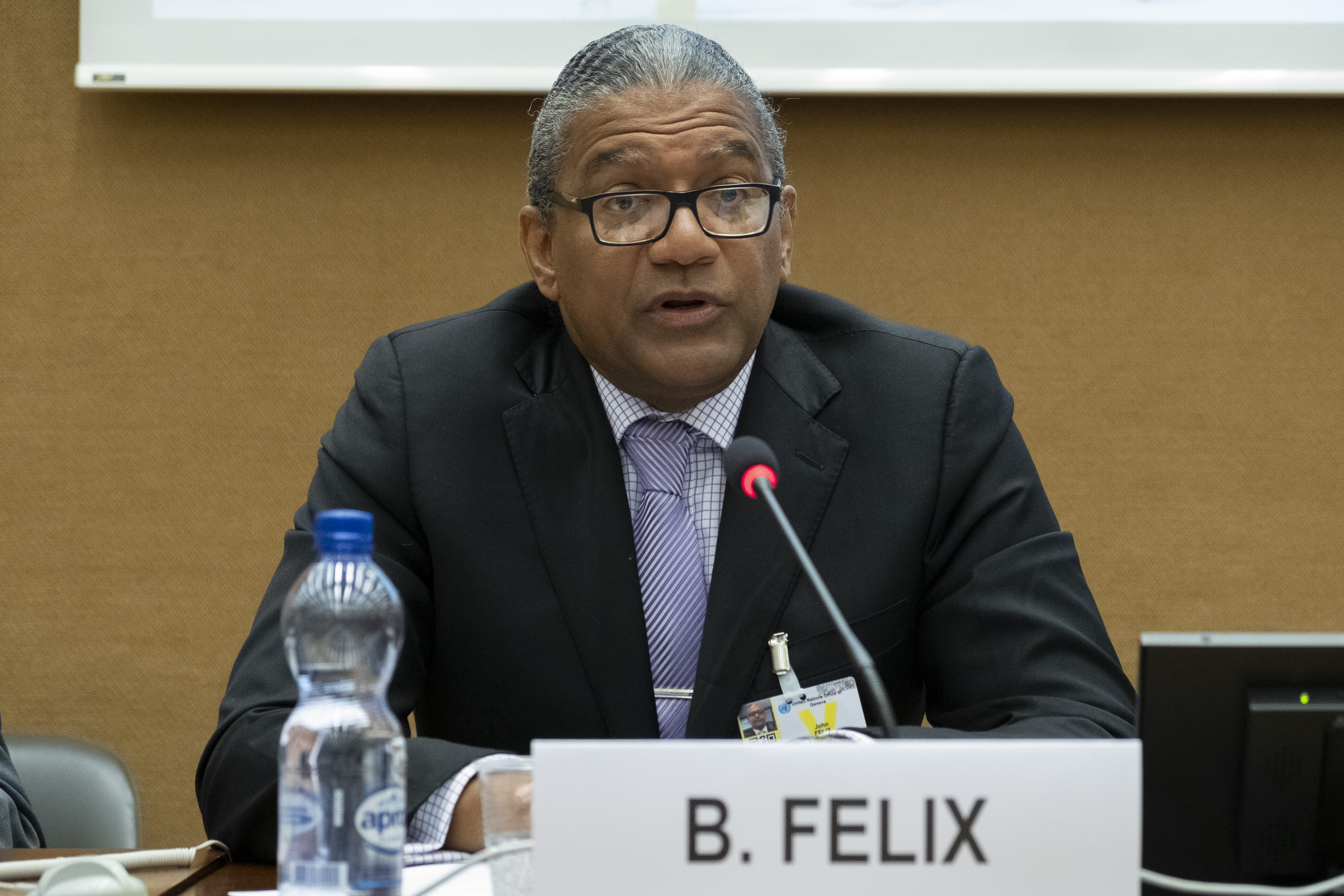

Member of Parliament for Choiseul
- Incumbent
- Assumed office 7 June 2016

Minister for Commerce, Industry, Investment, Enterprise Development and Consumer Affairs
- In office 7 June 2016 – 2021

Personal details
- Born: Bradley Felix
- Party: United Workers Party (Saint Lucia)

Bradley Felix is a Saint Lucian politician who was elected to represent Choiseul constituency in the House of Assembly in the 2021 general election. He is a member of the United Workers Party. He has served in the House of Assembly since 2016. Felix is now one of four opposition members in the House of Assembly after a landslide victory for the Saint Lucia Labour Party in the 2021 general election.
