= Dominic Fedee =

Saint Lucian politician

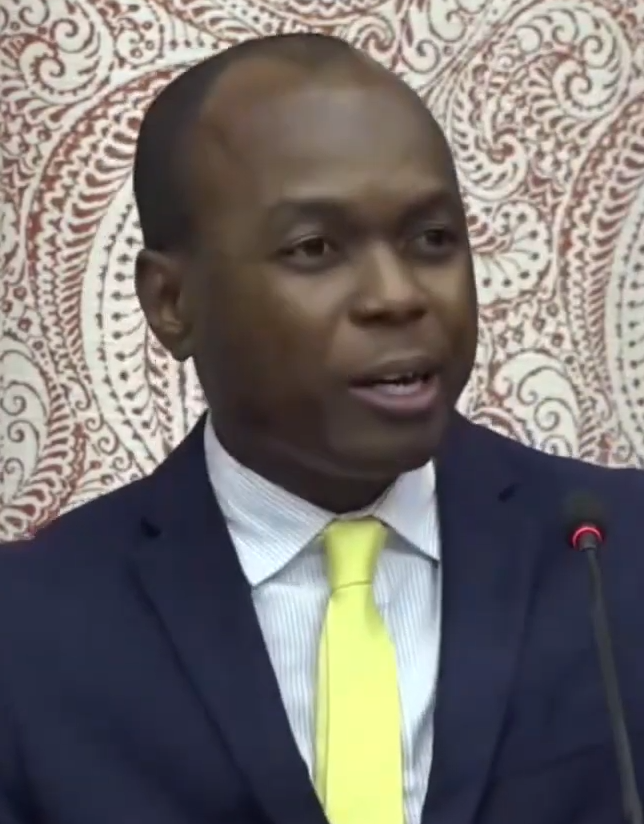
- Fedee in 2021

Member of Parliament for Anse la Raye
- In office 6 June 2016 – 26 July 2021

Member of the Senate
- In office 14 January 2016 – 6 June 2016

Minister for Tourism, Information and Broadcasting
- In office 14 June 2016 – 26 July 2021

Personal details
- Born: Dominic Fedee Guyana
- Party: United Workers Party

Dominic Fedee is a Saint Lucian politician of the United Workers Party. Fedee is the former Minister for Tourism, Information and Broadcasting. He was elected parliamentary representative for Anse la Raye/Canaires in the general election held on 6 June 2016. Fedee was later defeated in the 2021 general election.

Fedee is former OECS regional Public Relations Officer for Sandals Resorts. He was appointed as an opposition member of the Senate of Saint Lucia in January 2016.

Born in Guyana, Fedee is the brother of cricketer Sergio Fedee.
