= Philip J. Pierre =

Prime Minister of Saint Lucia since 2021

The Right Honourable Philip J. Pierre MP
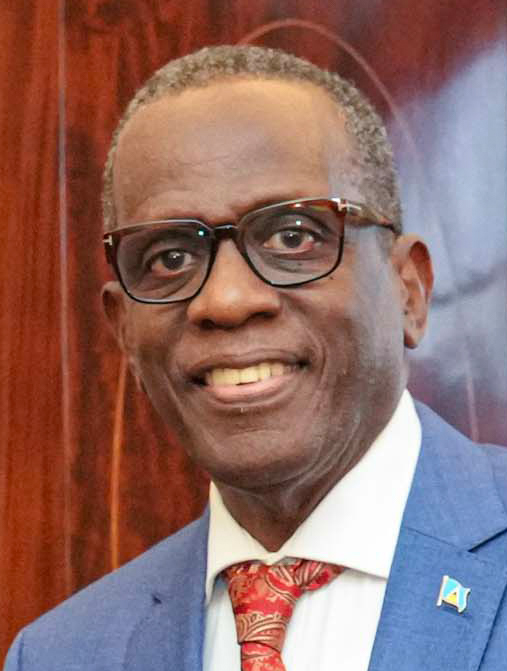
- Pierre in 2025

9th Prime Minister of Saint Lucia
- Incumbent
- Assumed office 28 July 2021
- Monarchs: Elizabeth II; Charles III
- Governors-General: Neville Cenac; Errol Charles; Felix Finisterre (acting)
- Deputy: Ernest Hilaire
- Preceded by: Allen Chastanet

12th Minister for Finance, Economic Development and the Youth Economy
- Incumbent
- Assumed office 5 August 2021
- Prime Minister: Himself
- Preceded by: Allen Chastanet

Leader of the Opposition
- In office 18 June 2016 – 28 July 2021
- Prime Minister: Allen Chastanet
- Preceded by: Kenny Anthony
- Succeeded by: Allen Chastanet

10th Deputy Prime Minister of Saint Lucia
- In office 30 November 2011 – 7 June 2016
- Prime Minister: Kenny Anthony
- Preceded by: Lenard Montoute
- Succeeded by: Ernest Hilaire (2022)

Member of Parliament
- Incumbent
- Assumed office 24 May 1997
- Preceded by: Romanus Lansiquot
- Constituency: Castries East

Chairman of the Caribbean Community
- Incumbent
- Assumed office 1 July 2026
- Preceded by: Terrance Drew

Personal details
- Born: Philip Joseph Pierre; 18 September 1954 (age 72) Castries, Saint Lucia
- Party: Saint Lucia Labour Party
- Education: University of the West Indies

Philip Joseph Pierre (born 18 September 1954) is a Saint Lucian politician currently serving as the prime minister of Saint Lucia since 2021. Pierre serves as the Minister for Finance, Economic Development and the Youth Economy. He is the Leader of the Saint Lucia Labour Party since 18 June 2016. He has represented the Castries East constituency in the House of Assembly since 1997.

Pierre previously served as Minister for Tourism, Civil Aviation and International Financial Services from 1997 to 2000; Minister of Commerce, Tourism, Investment and Consumer Affairs from 2001 to 2006; Deputy Prime Minister and Minister for Infrastructure, Port Services and Transport from 2011 to 2016; and as Leader of the Opposition from 2016 to 2021.

== Early life ==
Pierre's mother Evelyn was a schoolteacher, and his father Auguste was a policeman. He studied at Saint Mary's College, then completed a BA (hons) in accounts and a Master of Business Administration from the University of the West Indies. After graduation, he taught at Saint Mary's College and worked as a trainee manager at J.Q. Charles Ltd. Pierre then entered the finance industry: he worked as an audit clerk at Coopers & Lybrand and Pannell Kerr Forster, and as a financial controller at Stanthur Co. Ltd.

From 1985 to 1994, Pierre was the Director of the National Research and Development Corporation. He was also Chief Executive of his own management consultancy firm, Philip J. Pierre Business Services Ltd., from 1990 to 1997.

== Politics ==
Pierre joined the Saint Lucia Labour Party (SLP) in 1985, and served as the party treasurer from 1986 to 1992. He contested the 1992 Saint Lucian general election for the first time in Castries East, but did not win. After serving as the SLP chairman from 1992 to 1996, Pierre ran again in 1997 general election and won. In the resulting SLP government led by Kenny Anthony, Pierre served as Minister for Tourism, Civil Aviation and International Financial Services from 1997 to 2000 and Minister for Commerce, Tourism, Investment and Consumer Affairs from 2001 to 2006.

Pierre was re-elected to the House of Assembly from Castries East in the general elections of 2001, 2006, and 2011. In December 2011, he was sworn in as Deputy Prime Minister and Minister for Infrastructure, Port Services, and Transportation. Pierre retained his seat in the 2016 general election, but the SLP lost the election. Kenny Anthony resigned as party leader; Pierre was then elected as his successor on 18 June 2016. He also became the Leader of the Parliamentary Opposition.

Pierre is a member of the Commonwealth Parliamentary Association (CPA). He also joined the Assembly of Caribbean Community Parliamentarians, attending its inaugural 1996 meeting in Barbados.

Pierre led the SLP in the 2021 general election, where the party won a majority of seats. He was sworn in as Prime Minister on 28 July 2021.

Pierre obtained a second term as Prime Minister, after the victory of his party in the legislative elections of December 2025.

In May 2026, after the murder of Joy St. Omer in Castries District caused social outrage, Pierre condemned violence against women in the country and urged calm following calls to resume executions in Saint Lucia. The country has had a moratorium on the death penalty since 1995, when convicted rapist and murderer Joseph Solomon was hanged. Pierre defended his government's strategy to combat crime and stated that resuming capital punishment requires thinking "very, very carefully."

Assembly seats
Preceded by Romanus Lansiquot	Member of Parliament for Castries East; 1994–present	Incumbent
Political offices
Preceded by Gale Rigobert	Leader of the Opposition; 2016–2021	Succeeded by Allen Chastanet
Preceded by Allen Chastanet	Prime Minister of Saint Lucia; 2021–present	Incumbent
Party political offices
Preceded by Kenny Anthony	Leader of the Saint Lucia Labour Party; 2016–present	Incumbent
