= Allen Chastanet =

Prime Minister of Saint Lucia from 2016 to 2021

The Right Honourable Allen Chastanet MP
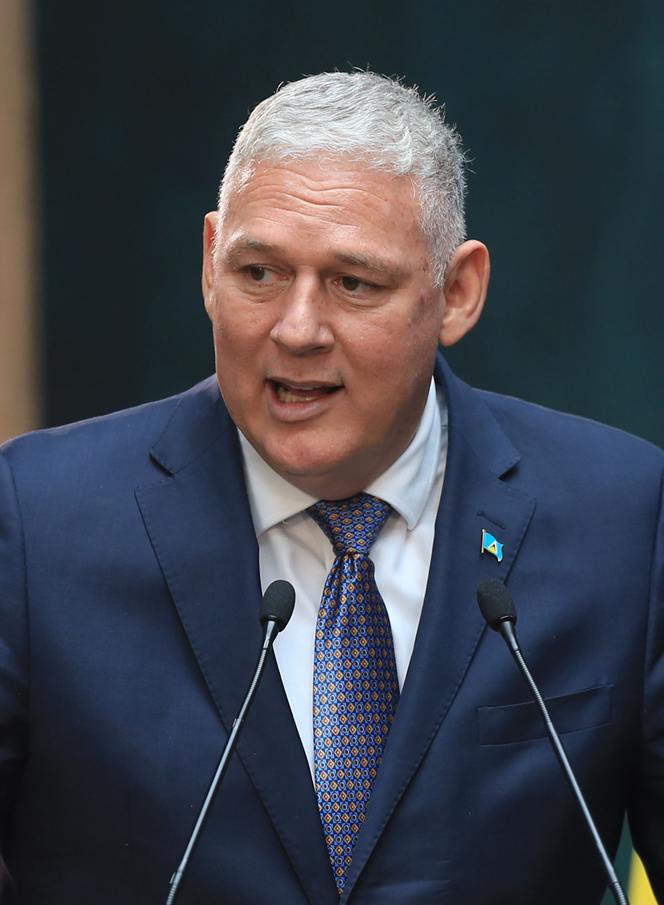
- Chastanet in 2017

8th Prime Minister of Saint Lucia
- In office 7 June 2016 – 28 July 2021
- Monarch: Elizabeth II
- Governors General: Pearlette Louisy; Neville Cenac
- Preceded by: Kenny Anthony
- Succeeded by: Philip J. Pierre

Leader of the Opposition
- Incumbent
- Assumed office 30 July 2021
- Monarchs: Elizabeth II; Charles III
- Prime Minister: Philip J. Pierre
- Preceded by: Philip J. Pierre

11th Minister of Finance
- In office 14 June 2016 – 28 July 2021
- Prime Minister: Himself
- Preceded by: Kenny Anthony
- Succeeded by: Philip J. Pierre

Member of Parliament
- Incumbent
- Assumed office 6 June 2016
- Preceded by: Arsene James
- Constituency: Micoud South

Personal details
- Born: Allen Michael Chastanet; 20 November 1960 (age 65) Martinique
- Party: United Workers Party
- Spouse: Raquel DuBoulay
- Parent: Michael Chastanet
- Education: Bishop's University; American University

Allen Michael Chastanet (born 20 November 1960) is a Saint Lucian businessman and politician who served as Prime Minister of Saint Lucia from 2016 to 2021. He is currently the Leader of the Opposition of Saint Lucia and the political leader of the United Workers Party as well as the parliamentary representative for Micoud South constituency.

== Education ==
In 1979, Chastanet graduated from high school at Stanstead College in Stanstead, Quebec. He holds a B.A. degree from Bishop's University and an M.Sc. degree from American University.

== Business career ==
Chastanet worked as vice president of marketing and sales for Air Jamaica. He is the managing director of the Coco Palm Hotel in Rodney Bay.

== Political career ==
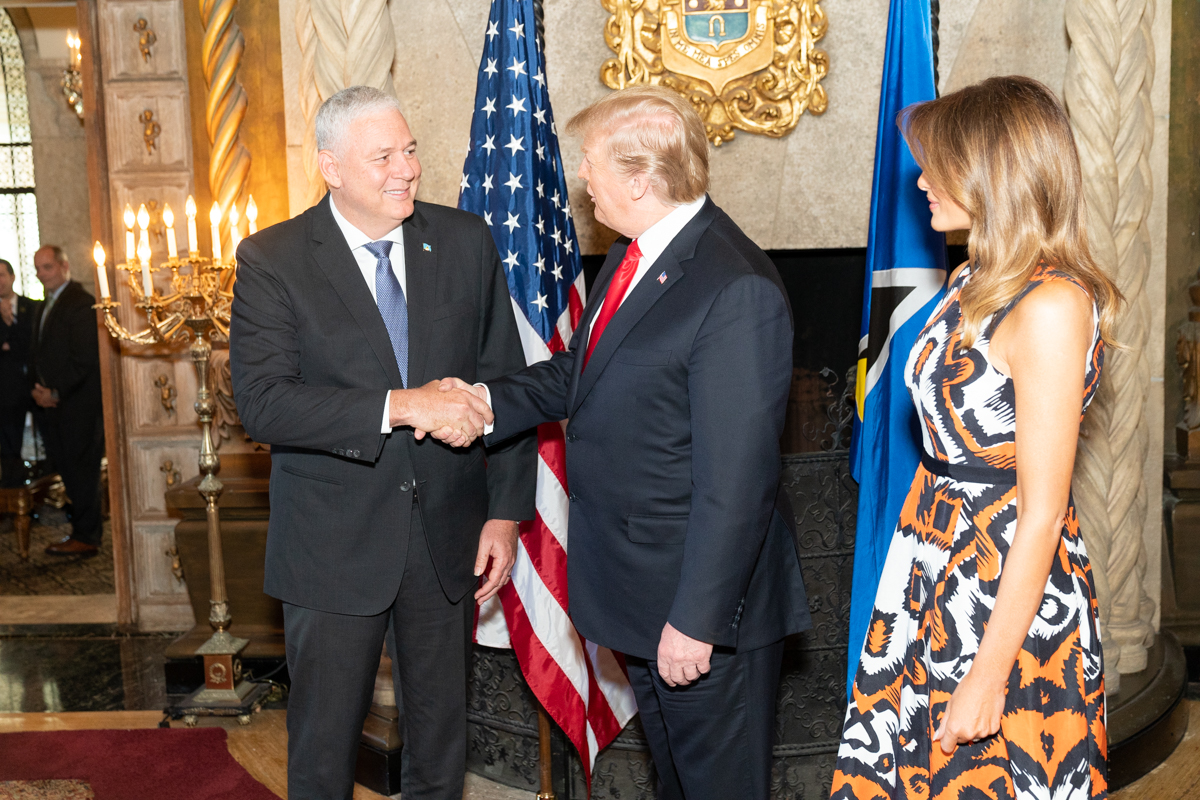
Chastanet and U.S. President Donald Trump in 2019

Chastanet was Minister for Tourism and Civil Aviation and a member of the Saint Lucian Senate from 2006 to 2011. Chastanet unsuccessfully ran for a parliament seat for Soufriere Constituency in the 2011 general election. In 2013, he was elected leader of the opposition United Workers Party. Chastanet won the parliament seat for Micoud South constituency in the 2016 general election. He was sworn in as Prime Minister on 7 June 2016. He held the additional portfolios of Minister of Finance, Economic Growth, Job Creation, External Affairs and the Public Service.

On 26 July 2021, Chastanet and his political party United Workers Party were not successful in the 2021 Saint Lucian general election after they were defeated by the Saint Lucia Labour Party by a landslide. On 30 July 2021, Chastanet was appointed Leader of the Opposition. His party fell to just 1 seat in the 2025 general election.

== Political positions ==
In April 2022, Chastanet stated his support for Saint Lucia to become a republic.

== Personal life ==
Chastanet is the son of businessman Michael Chastanet. Allen Chastanet is married to attorney-at-law Raquel DuBoulay-Chastanet. They have two children.

== See also ==
- List of foreign ministers in 2017
- List of current foreign ministers

Political offices
| Preceded by Kenny Anthony | Prime Minister of Saint Lucia; 2016–2021 | Succeeded by Philip J. Pierre |
