= Guy Joseph =

Saint Lucian politician

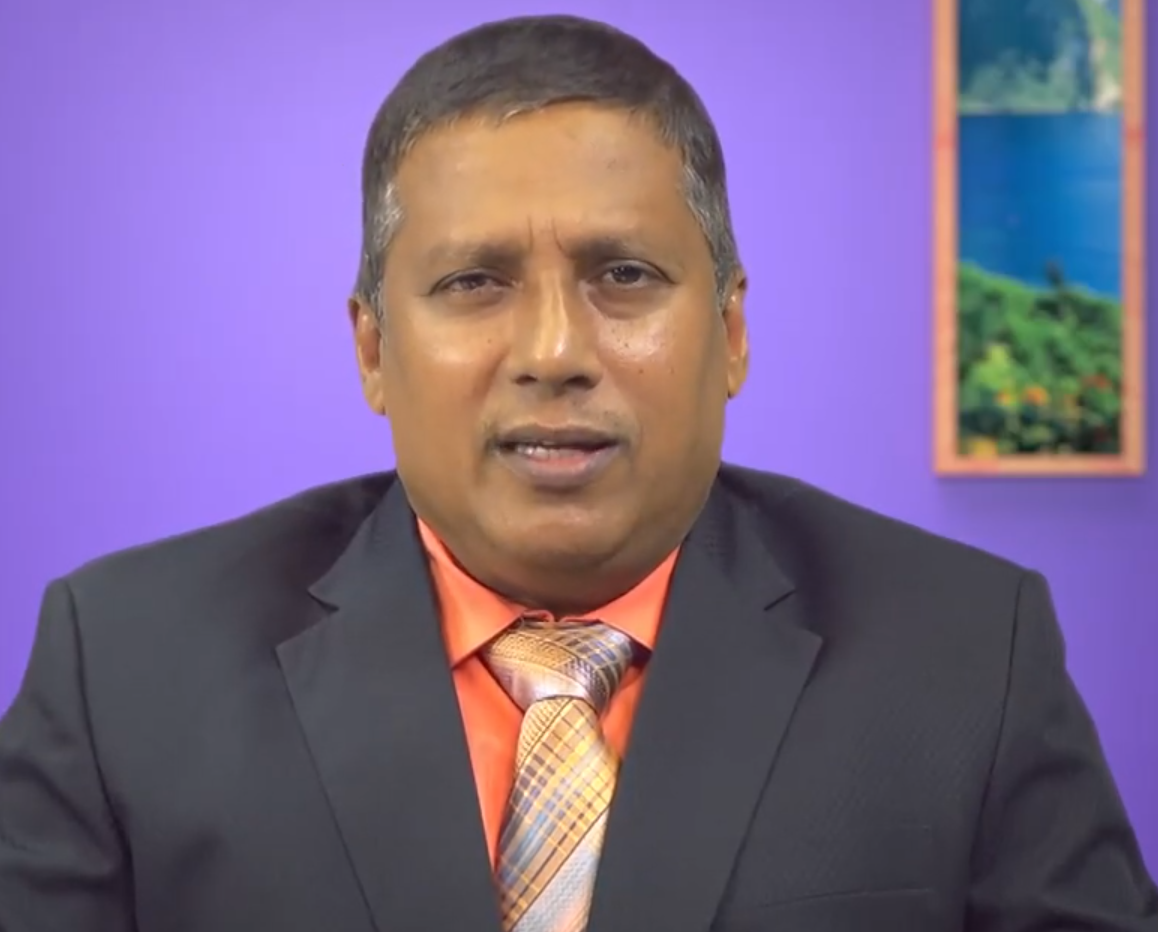
- Joseph in 2020

MP for Castries South East
- Prime Minister: John Compton
- Constituency: Castries South East

Minister for Communications, Works, Transport and Public Utilities
- In office 19 December 2006 – 2011

Minister for Economic Development, Housing, Urban Renewal, Transport and Civil Aviation
- In office 2016–2021

Personal details
- Born: 1966 (age 59–60)

Guy Eardley Joseph (born 1966) is a Saint Lucian politician and former representative for the constituency of Castries South East for the United Workers Party. Joseph was defeated in the St. Lucia 2021 General Election.

Joseph won the seat at the general election held on 11 December 2006, defeating Menissa Rambally. In the government of Prime Minister John Compton, sworn in on 19 December 2006, Joseph was appointed Minister for Communications, Works, Transport and Public Utilities.

== Personal life ==
Joseph is a member of the Seventh-day Adventist Church.
