= Shawn Edward =

Saint Lucian politician

The Right Honourable Shawn Edward MP
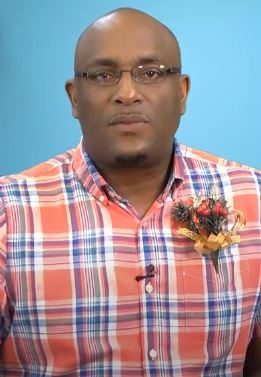
- Edward in 2020

Member of Parliament for Dennery North
- Incumbent
- Assumed office 28 November 2011

Minister for Youth Development and Sports
- In office 2011–2016

Minister for Education, Sustainable Development, Innovation, Science, Technology and Vocational Training
- Incumbent
- Assumed office 5 August 2021

2nd Deputy Political Leader of the Saint Lucia Labour Party
- Incumbent
- Assumed office 28 September 2019

Personal details
- Born: Shawn Edward
- Party: Saint Lucia Labour Party

Shawn Edward is a Saint Lucian politician and representative in the House of Assembly for the Constituency of Dennery North for the Saint Lucia Labour Party. Edward also serves as Minister for Education, Sustainable Development, Innovation, Science, Technology and Vocational Training. Edward won his seat once again at the 2021 Saint Lucian General Election. He is also the 2nd Deputy Political Leader of the Saint Lucia Labour Party. Edward has not lost his seat since his entry in the 2011 Saint Lucian General Election.

== Political career ==
Edward made his debut in Lucian politics in 2011 winning his seat. From there he went on to be Minister for Youth Development and Sports during the Kenny Anthony led administration. Edward claimed his spot in the 2021 Saint Lucian General Election, where he was later sworn in as Minister for Education, Sustainable Development, Innovation, Science, Technology and Vocational Training.
