= Moses Jean Baptiste =

Saint Lucian politician

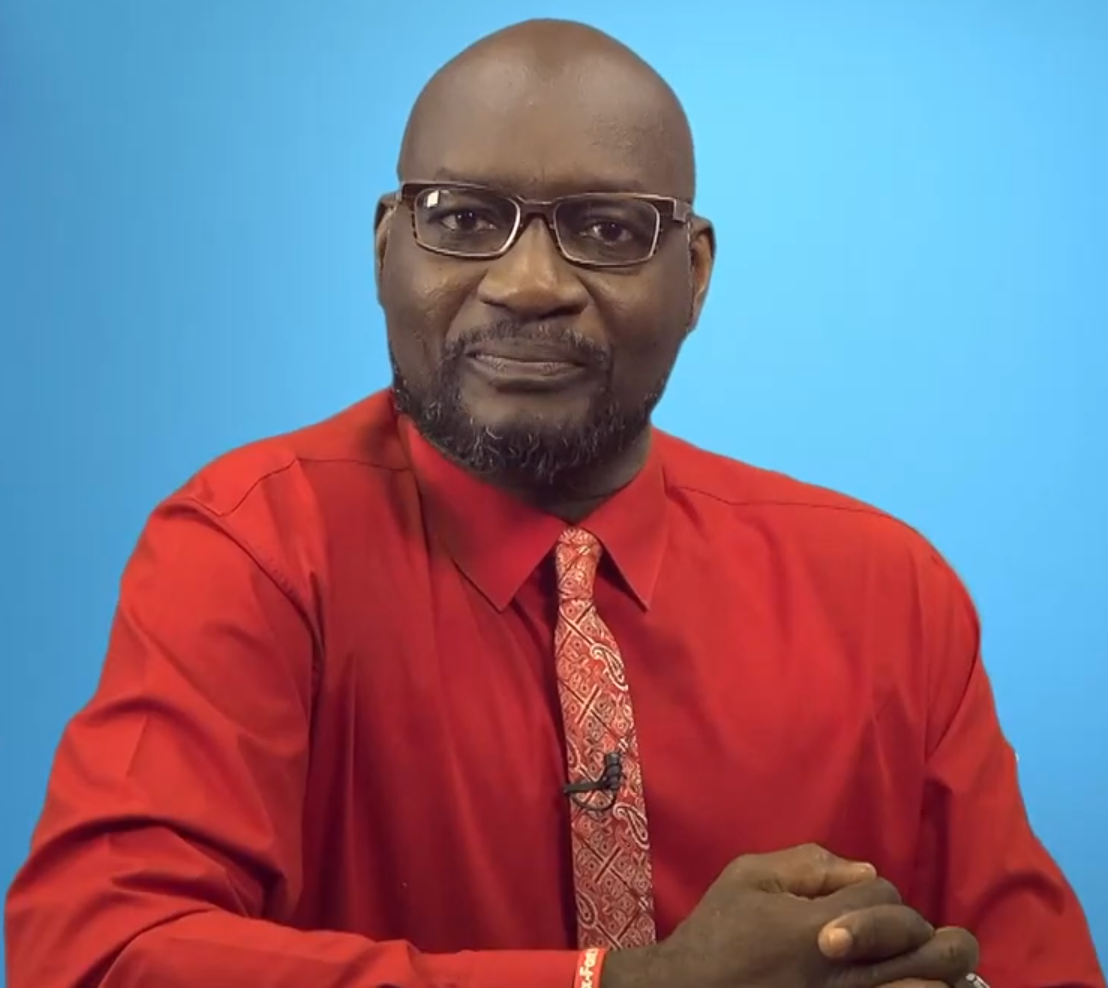
Jn. Baptiste in 2020

Moses Jn. Baptiste is a St. Lucian politician. He is the Parliamentary Representative for Vieux Fort North.

Jn. Baptiste resides in Pierrot, Vieux-Fort. Before entering politics, Moses was an agricultural science teacher at the Vieux Fort Comprehensive Secondary School Campus A and then moved on to be the head master at the Vieux Fort Primary school. Jn. Baptiste is part of a local cultural and drumming called "tanbou melee." He successfully contested the 2006 general elections in St. Lucia and is a first term Parliamentarian. Hon. Moses Jn. Baptiste is the Labour Party's spokesperson on Rural Development, Agriculture and Culture.

He is also a poet, farmer and dramatist.
