= Micoud District =

- District
- Location of Micoud District within Saint Lucia
- Coordinates: 13°49′N 60°54′WTown of Micoud
- Country: St. Lucia

Area
  - Total: 112.1 km^{2} (43.3 sq mi)

Population (2010)
  - Total: 16,284
  - Density: 145/km^{2} (380/sq mi)
- ISO 3166-2:LC: LC-08

Micoud District is one of 10 districts (formerly called quarters) of the Caribbean island nation of Saint Lucia The seat of this district is the town of Micoud inside this district. According to the 2002 census, the population of the district was 16,143 people. The final 2010 Census recorded a population of 16,284 in Micoud District. A former quarter, Praslin Quarter, was merged into Micoud Quarter. It was not enumerated separately in the 2010 Census. The 2001 Census shows Praslin as part of Micoud District.

The Micoud District is divided into two electoral constituencies represented in the House of Assembly of Saint Lucia. The electoral constituencies has been represented since July 2021 by Jeremiah Norbert (Micoud North) and Allen Chastanet (Micoud South) as Parliamentary Representatives. The district elected their representatives during the countries recent general election.

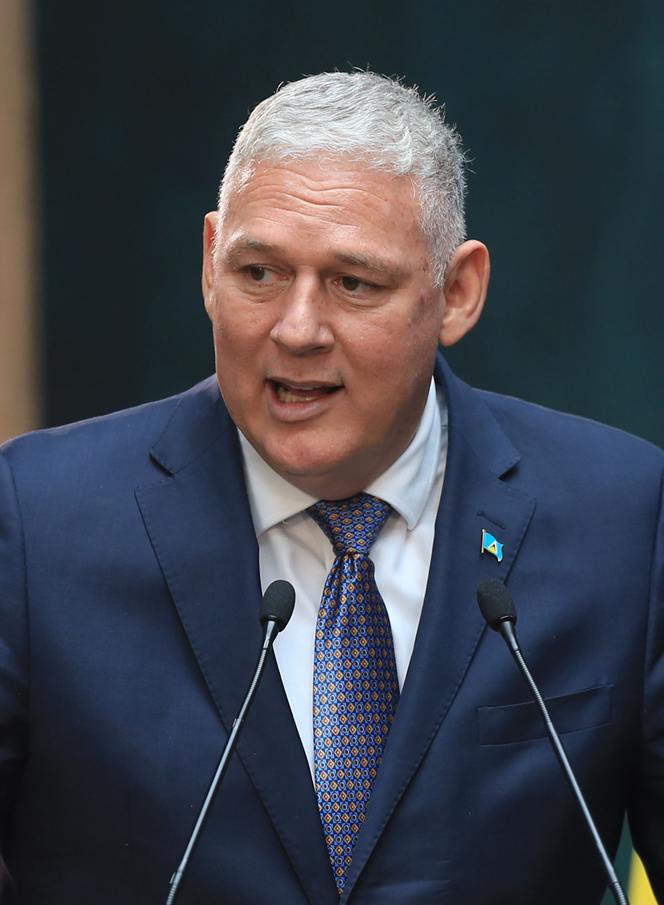
Current Representative for Micoud South - Allen Chastanet

== Government ==
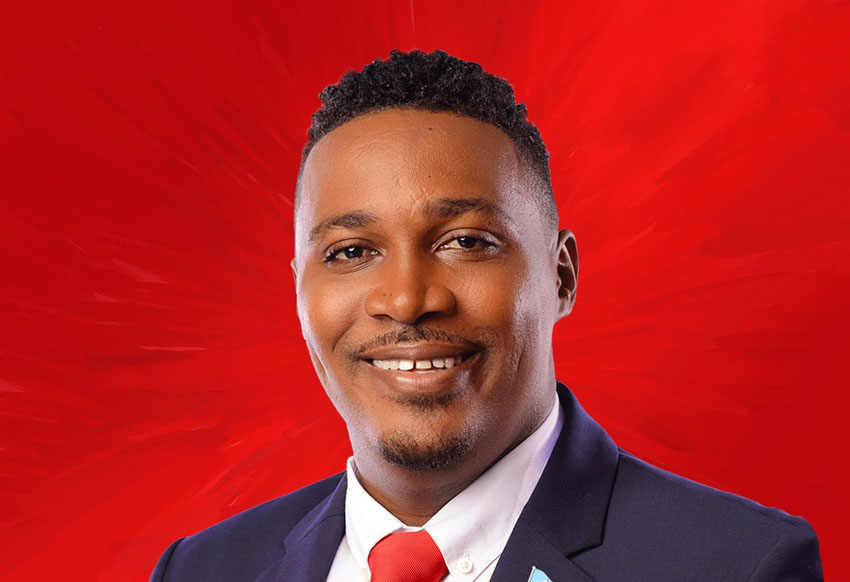
Current Representative for Micoud North- Jeremiah Norbert

The Micoud District is divided into two electoral constituencies represented in the House of Assembly of Saint Lucia. The electoral constituencies has been represented since July 2021 by Jeremiah Norbert (Micoud North) and Allen Chastanet (Micoud South) as Parliamentary Representatives. The district elected their representatives during the countries recent general election.

== Locations in Micoud District ==
Micoud District is divided into 69 second-order administrative divisions.

=== Estates ===
The following estates are within the Micoud District:

- Beauchamp Estate, 13°48′57″N 60°54′52″W
- Canelles Estate, 13°47′09″N 60°54′50″W
- Fond Estate, 13°50′07″N 60°54′22″W
- Fond Raillon Estate, 13°51′34″N 60°55′51″W
- Mamiku Estate, 13°52′16″N 60°54′38″W
- Mondésir Estate, 13°49′16″N 60°54′35″W
- Moreau Estate, 13°49′49″N 60°56′34″W
- Orangerie Estate, 13°51′00″N 60°55′00″W
- Palmiste Estate, 13°51′19″N 60°57′34″W
- Praslin Estate, 13°53′01″N 60°53′47″W
- Savannes Estate, 13°46′09″N 60°55′47″W
- Troumassée Estate, 13°48′34″N 60°54′18″W

=== Towns ===
The following populated places are towns within Micoud District:

- Mon Repos, 13°51′35″N 60°54′08″W
- Ti Rocher, 13°49′00″N 60°55′49″W
- Troumasse, 13°49′00″N 60°55′00″W
- Vige, 13°47′12″N 60°55′50″W
- Malgrétoute, 13°50′28″N 60°54′14″W
- Mamiku, 13°51′56″N 60°54′10″W
- Planard, 13°48′34″N 60°54′56″W
- Patience, 13°51′04″N 60°54′34″W
- Old Settlement, 13°53′00″N 60°54′00″W
- La Pointe, 13°50′46″N 60°54′08″W
- Hellene, 13°47′00″N 60°55′00″W
- Fond Devaux, 13°51′00″N 60°55′00″W
- Dugard, 13°48′42″N 60°54′46″W
- De Mailly, 13°47′47″N 60°57′06″W
- D’Aubaigon, 13°50′00″N 60°55′00″W
- Blanchard, 13°48′22″N 60°56′47″W
- Anse Ger, 13°47′52″N 60°54′59″W
- Angere, 13°47′00″N 60°55′00″W
- Anbre, 13°49′49″N 60°55′47″W

=== Nature reserves ===
There are three forest or nature reserves within Micoud District:

- Frigate Islands Nature Reserve, 13°52′46″N 60°53′01″W
- Quilesse Forest Reserve, 13°50′41″N 60°58′28″W
- Savannes Bay Nature Reserve, 13°45′47″N 60°55′25″W

=== Islands and mountains ===
There are three significant islands and three significant mountains within Micoud District:

- Frigate Island, 13°52′46″N 60°53′00″W
- Praslin Island, 13°52′31″N 60°53′23″W
- Scorpion Island, 13°45′56″N 60°55′22″W
- Mount Beaucoup, 13°51′46″N 60°58′09″W
- Mount Durocher, 13°51′49″N 60°55′30″W
- Piton Saint Esprit, 13°50′57″N 60°58′45″W

== Notable people ==
The following notable people were from the Micoud District:

- Sesenne (1914-2010), singer and cultural icon
- Daren Sammy, former West Indies cricketer and Head Coach of the West Indies

== See also ==
- List of cities in Saint Lucia
- List of rivers of Saint Lucia
