= House of Assembly of Saint Lucia =

Lower house of the Parliament of Saint Lucia

House of Assembly of Saint Lucia Chambre d'assemblée de Sainte-Lucie
- 12th Saint Lucian Parliament

Type
- Type: Lower House of the Parliament of Saint Lucia

History
- Founded: March 1, 1967

Leadership
- Speaker: Claudius Francis, SLP since 17 August 2021
- Prime Minister: Philip J. Pierre, SLP since 28 July 2021
- Leader of the Opposition: Allen Chastanet, UWP since 30 July 2021

Structure
- Seats: 17 MPs
- House political groups: HM Government: SLP (14); Independent (2); HM Loyal Opposition: UWP (1)

Elections
- House voting system: First-past-the-post
- Last House election: 1 December 2025
- Next House election: 1 December 2030

Meeting place
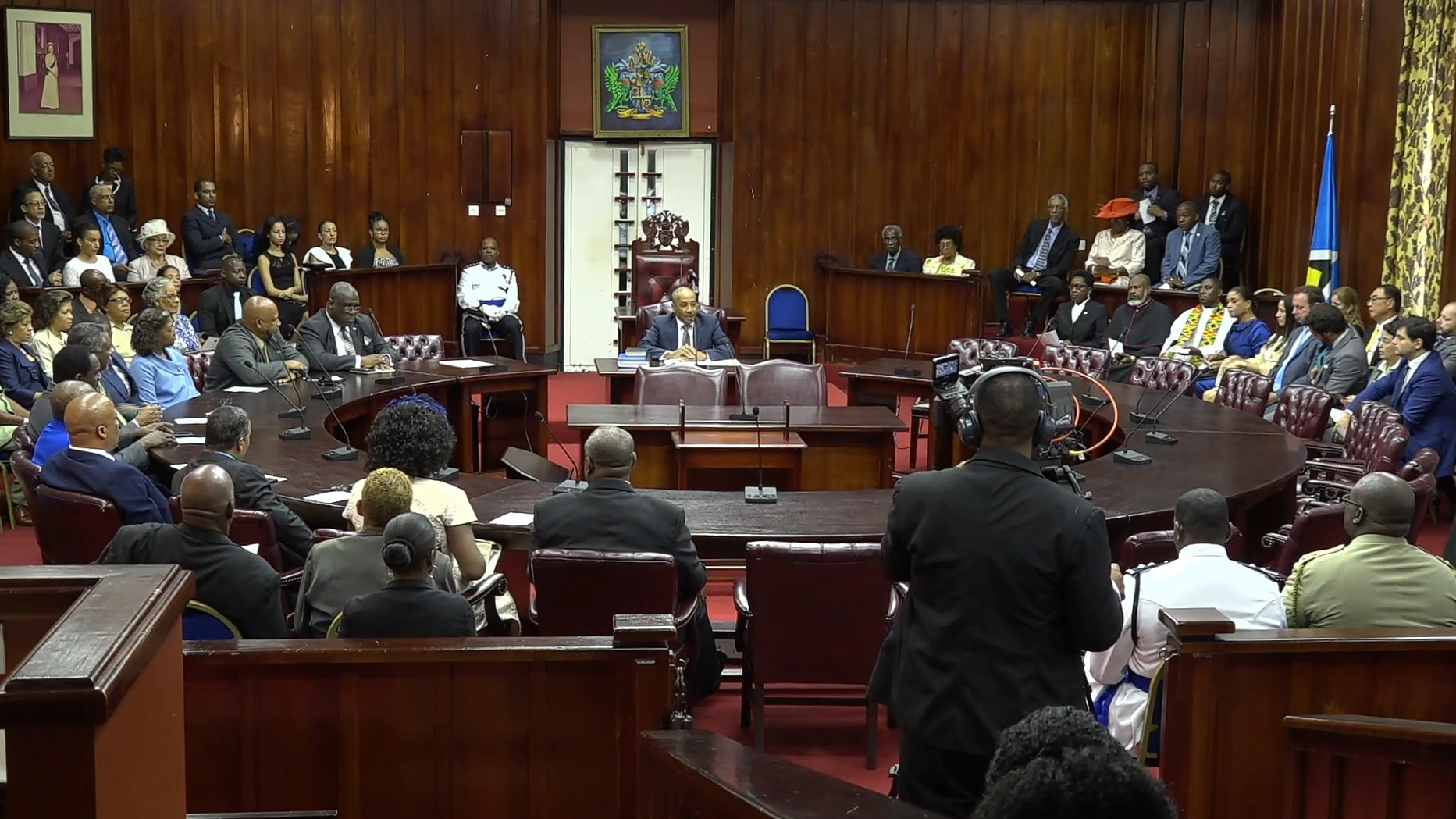

Website
- parliament.govt.lc

The House of Assembly is the lower house of the Parliament of Saint Lucia, elected by popular vote. The upper house is the Senate. It has 17 or 18 members: 17 members elected for a five-year term in single-seat constituencies, and a speaker elected by the 17 members, who may be one of their number or a person chosen from outside the House. To be elected to the house, a person must be at least 21 years old.

== History ==
House of Assembly was established in 1967 when associated statehood was attained. It replaced the legislative council.

== Relationship with the government ==
Section 60 of the Constitution of Saint Lucia requires the prime minister of Saint Lucia to be a member of the House of Assembly. It provides for the governor-general to "appoint a member of the House who appears to him likely to command the support of the majority of the members of the House" and for the office to fall vacant if the prime minister ceases to be a member of the House of Assembly for any reason other than the dissolution of parliament.

== Latest general election ==
Party	Votes	%	Seats	+/–
Saint Lucia Labour Party	48,784	55.77	14	+1
United Workers Party	32,545	37.20	1	–1
National Congress Party	42	0.05	0	New
Independents	6,108	6.98	2	0
Total	87,479	100.00	17	0
Valid votes	87,479	97.79		
Invalid/blank votes	1,980	2.21		
Total votes	89,459	100.00		
Registered voters/turnout	184,654	48.45		

== Current composition ==
Following the election of 26 July 2021, the House of Assembly of Saint Lucia comprises the following members:

Constituency	Name	Party
Gros Islet	Kenson Casimir	SLP
Babonneau	Virginia Poyotte	SLP
Castries East	Philip J. Pierre	SLP
Castries South	Ernest Hilaire	SLP
Castries South East	Joachim Henry	SLP
Anse la Raye and Canaries	Wayne Girard	SLP
Soufriere	Emma Hippolyte	SLP
Laborie	Alva Baptiste	SLP
Vieux Fort North	Moses Jean Baptiste	SLP
Vieux Fort South	Kenny Anthony	SLP
Micoud North	Jeremiah Norbert	SLP
Dennery South	Alfred Prospere	SLP
Dennery North	Shawn Edward	SLP
Micoud South	Allen Chastanet	UWP
Choiseul	Bradley Felix	UWP
Castries Central	Richard Frederick	IND
Castries North	Stephenson King	IND

== Constituencies ==
Electoral boundaries of Saint Lucia

Saint Lucia has 17 electoral segments, each of which elects one Parliamentary Representative to the House of Assembly:

District	Constituencies
Gros Islet	Gros Islet, Castries North, Babonneau
Castries	Babonneau, Castries East, Castries South, Castries South East, Castries North
Anse la Raye	Anse la Raye and Canaries
Canaries	Anse la Raye and Canaries
Soufrière	Soufrière
Laborie	Laborie
Vieux Fort	Vieux Fort North, Vieux Fort South
Micoud	Micoud North, Micoud South, Vieux Fort North, Dennery South
Dennery	Dennery South, Dennery North
Choiseul	Choiseul

== See also ==
- List of speakers of the House of Assembly of Saint Lucia
- Districts of Saint Lucia
