= Soufrière =

Soufrière may refer to:

== Places ==
- Soufrière Estate, Saint Lucia

=== Settlements, jurisdictions, political geography ===
- Soufrière, Dominica, a village on the southwest coast of Dominica in the Caribbean
- Petit Soufrière, Dominica, a village on the east coast of Dominica
- Soufrière, Saint Lucia, a town in Saint Lucia in the Caribbean
- Soufrière District, Saint Lucia

=== Landforms, geology, natural geography ===
- Soufrière River, Saint Lucia

==== Volcanic ====
- La Grande Soufrière or simply La Soufrière, a volcano in Guadeloupe in the Caribbean
- Soufrière Hills, a volcano on Montserrat in the Caribbean
- La Soufrière (volcano), a volcano on the island of Saint Vincent in the Caribbean
- Soufrière Volcanic Center, a caldera on Saint Lucia

== Other uses ==
- La Soufrière (film), a film by director Werner Herzog
