= Soufriere Mini Stadium =

Stadium in Soufrière, Saint Lucia

Coordinates: 13°51′25.8″N 61°03′20.1″W

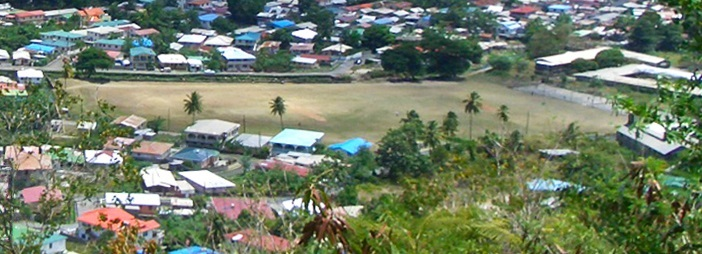
- Stadium site in 2007 before development
- Interactive map of Soufriere Mini Stadium
- Location: Soufriere, Saint Lucia
- Capacity: 500
- Surface: artificial turf

Construction
- Groundbreaking: 5 April 2019

Soufriere Mini Stadium is a multi-purpose stadium in Soufriere, Saint Lucia which meets FIFA international standards. The stadium also contains a 400-meter IAAF standard running track.

== History ==
By May 2019, the Government of Saint Lucia had announced that the Soufriere Mini Stadium would be redeveloped to meet international standards of FIFA and CONCACAF. Meeting these requirements would allow the venue to host international competitions of these organizations, in addition to the domestic association football leagues. A groundbreaking ceremony was held on 5 April 2019. In December of that year, Prime Minister Allen Chastanet announced that the earthworks for the redevelopment of the stadium were nearly complete with completion of the entire project expected the following year. By January 2021, structural work of the stadium was mostly complete with the synthetic running track and artificial turf field surface installed. The following month, the government announced that the EC$10.1 million first phase of the project was concluding. At that time they also announced that the government would begin planning to refurbish the grandstand to international standards with work expected to begin in 2022. At completion, the stadium project would be the first of its kind in Saint Lucia since the construction of the George Odlum Stadium and the Darren Sammy Cricket Ground almost twenty years prior.
