= Soufrière District =

- Districts
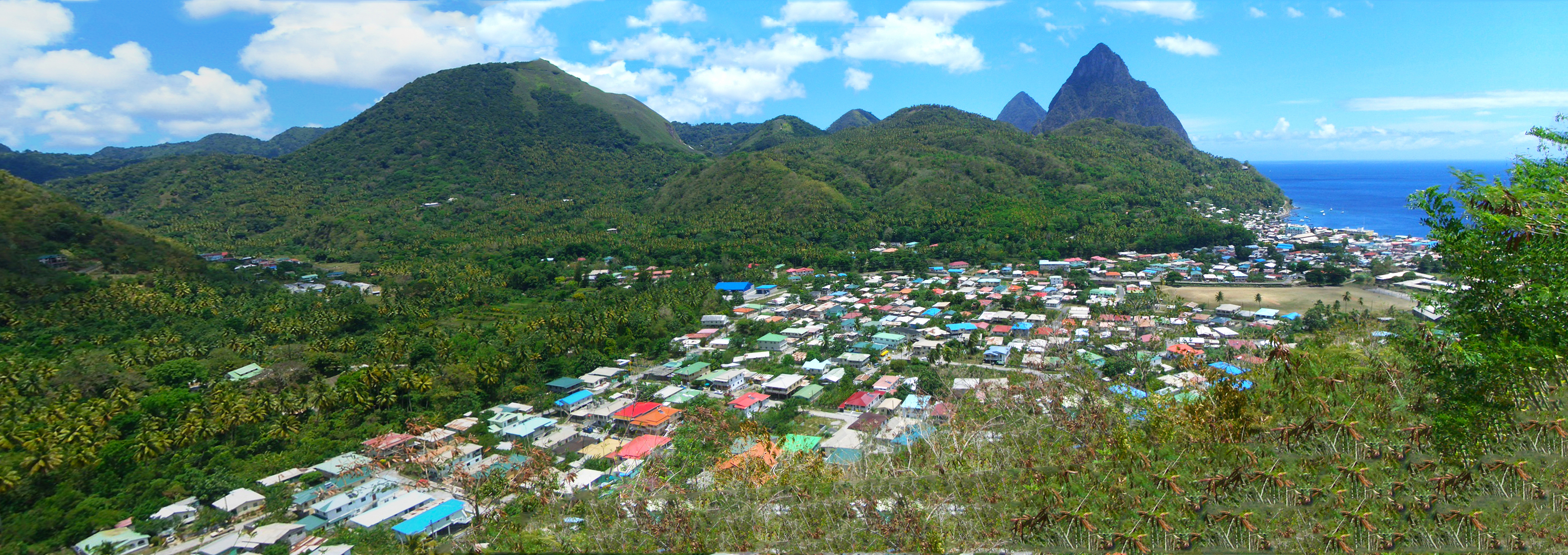

- Location of Soufrière District within Saint Lucia
- Coordinates (Town of Soufrière): 13°51′19″N 61°03′30″W
- Country: Saint Lucia

Area
  - Total: 58.4 km^{2} (22.5 sq mi)

Population (2010)
  - Total: 7,657
  - Density: 131/km^{2} (340/sq mi)
- ISO 3166-2:LC: LC-10

Soufrière is a district on the Southwest coast of Saint Lucia in the West Indies. Soufrière was the former capital of Saint Lucia during times of French rule. It is now a small fishing port with an emerging tourism industry. It has several tourist sites, including a "drive-in" volcano, the Diamond Botanical Gardens with waterfall (briefly featured in Superman II) and historic mineral baths, plus the nearby beaches of Anse Chastanet to the north and Malgretout to the south.

== History ==
The name Soufrière came from the French who dominated during the 1700s. The French word Soufrière means volcanic area or sulphur in the air.

The nearby plantation at Anse Mamin, formerly Malmaison, was at one time owned by Gaspard-Joseph Tascher de La Pagerie father of Josephine de Beauharnais. Although the exact locale of her birth has been the subject of dispute by historians, it is certain that the Empress spent much of her childhood on her father's plantation.

Framing the town to the south are the Pitons - comprising the Gros Piton and Petit Piton. They rise directly up from the coral reef beds and form part of a UNESCO World Heritage Site. The region is commonly visited for snorkeling and scuba diving.

Soufrière doubled as the fictional town Port Agnes, capital of the equally fictional island of Cascara in the 1985 comedy movie Water. The movies Creature and White Squall were also filmed there.

== Government ==
The Soufrière District is an electoral constituency and has been represented since July 2021 in the House of Assembly of Saint Lucia by Emma Hippolyte Parliamentary Representative for the Soufrière electoral constituency.

== Local attractions ==
The following attractions are within the borders of the quarter:

- The Pitons: Gros Piton and Petit Piton are two giant volcanic plugs located south of Soufrière and are a UNESCO World Heritage Site.
- Sulfur springs: Soufrière is located within the caldera of the dormant Qualibou volcano and the area is geothermally active. Marketed as a drive-through volcano, there are numerous hot springs and fumaroles.
- Soufrière Estate: Also known as Diamond Estate, this is an old colonial estate that is home to a botanical garden, sulphur baths and Diamond Falls.
- Fond Doux Estate: A working plantation where cacao is still processed.
- St Lucia's Rainforest: There are several rainforest trails in the locale with views of the surrounding area, abundant wildlife and several waterfalls such as the Enbas Saut Falls.
- Anse Chastanet: A resort with a beach and several trails along the coast.

== Gallery ==
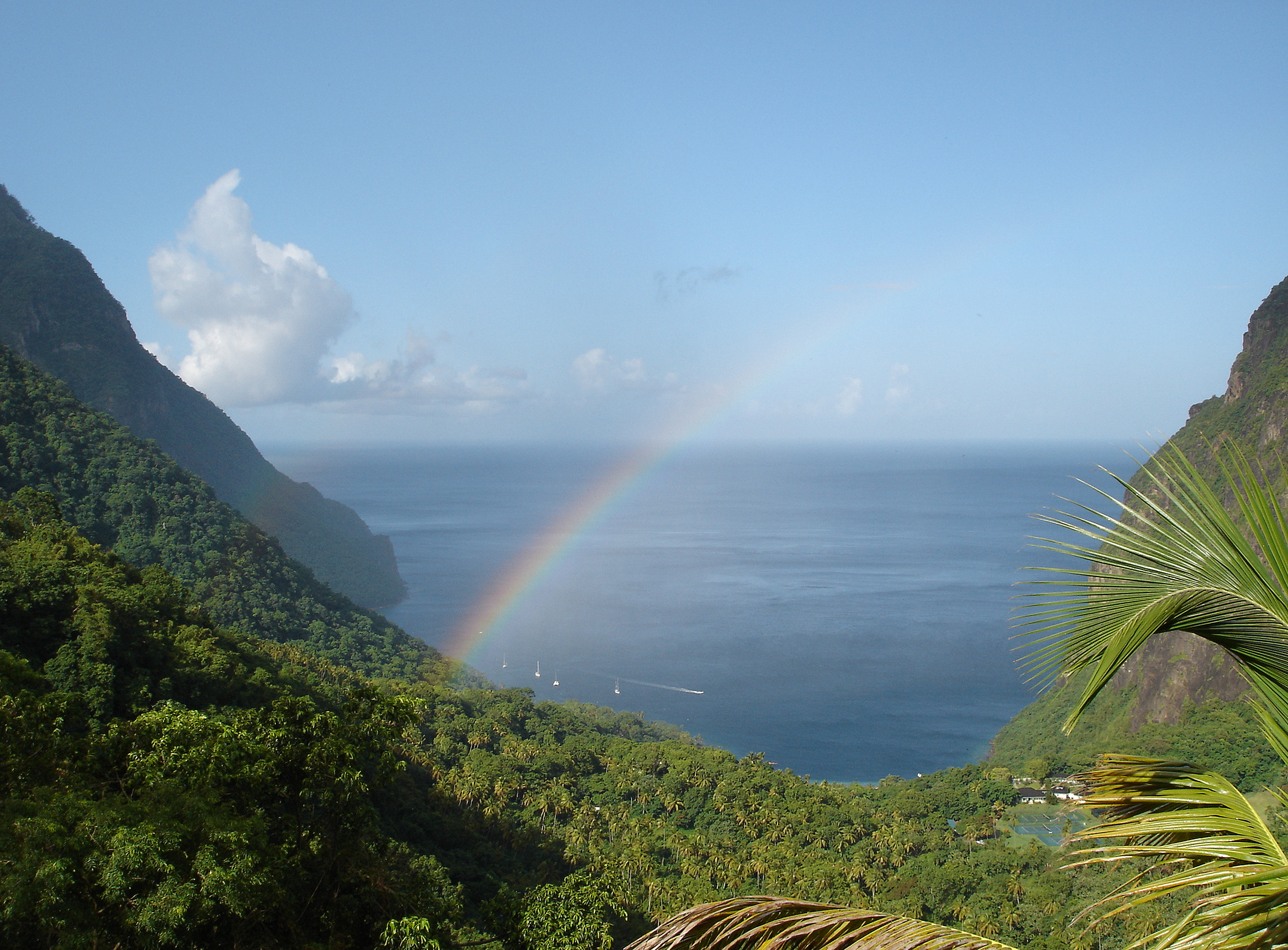
Piton Valley, part of the UNESCO World Heritage Site near Soufrière

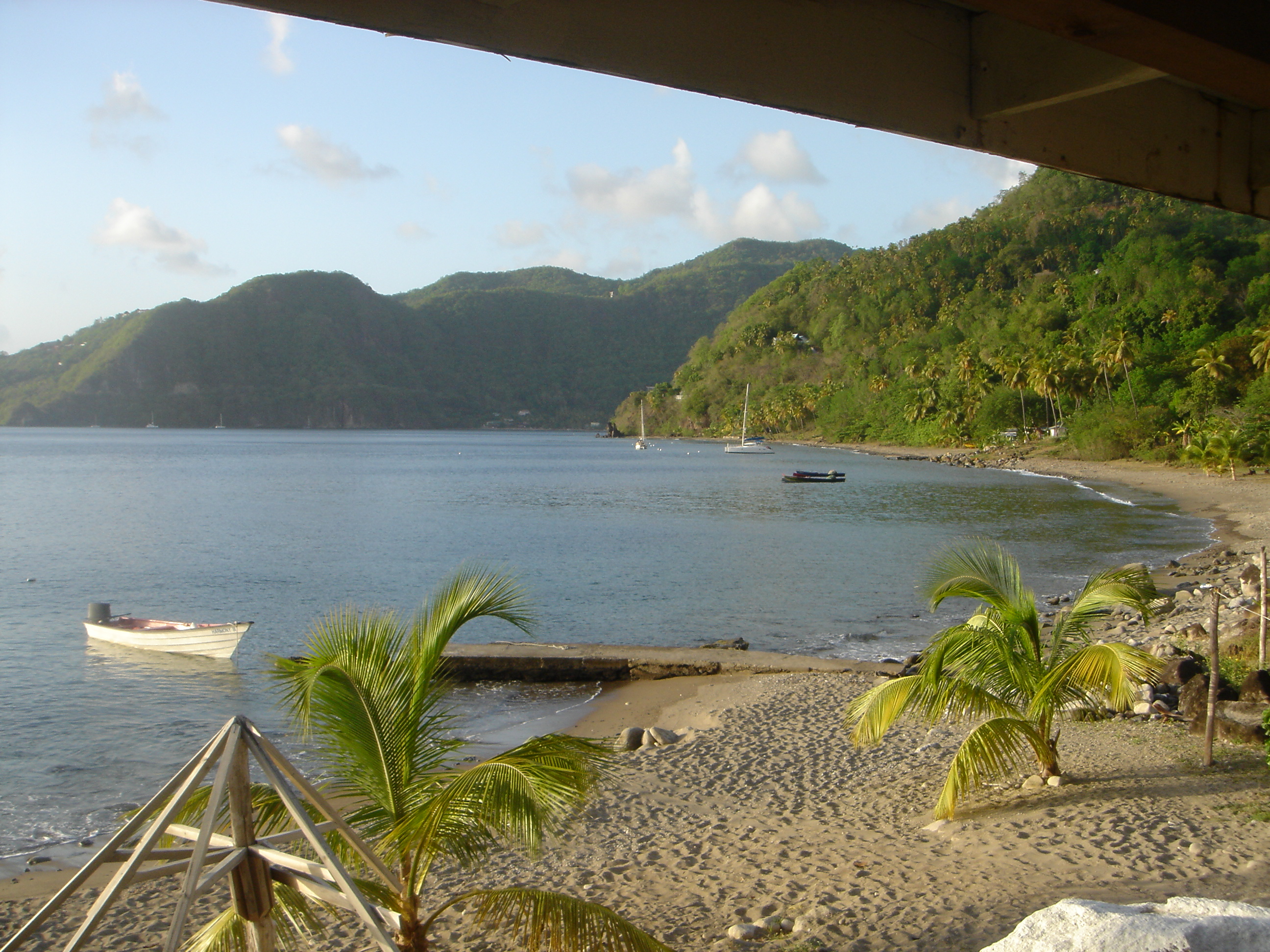
Malgretout Beach, looking north towards Soufrière

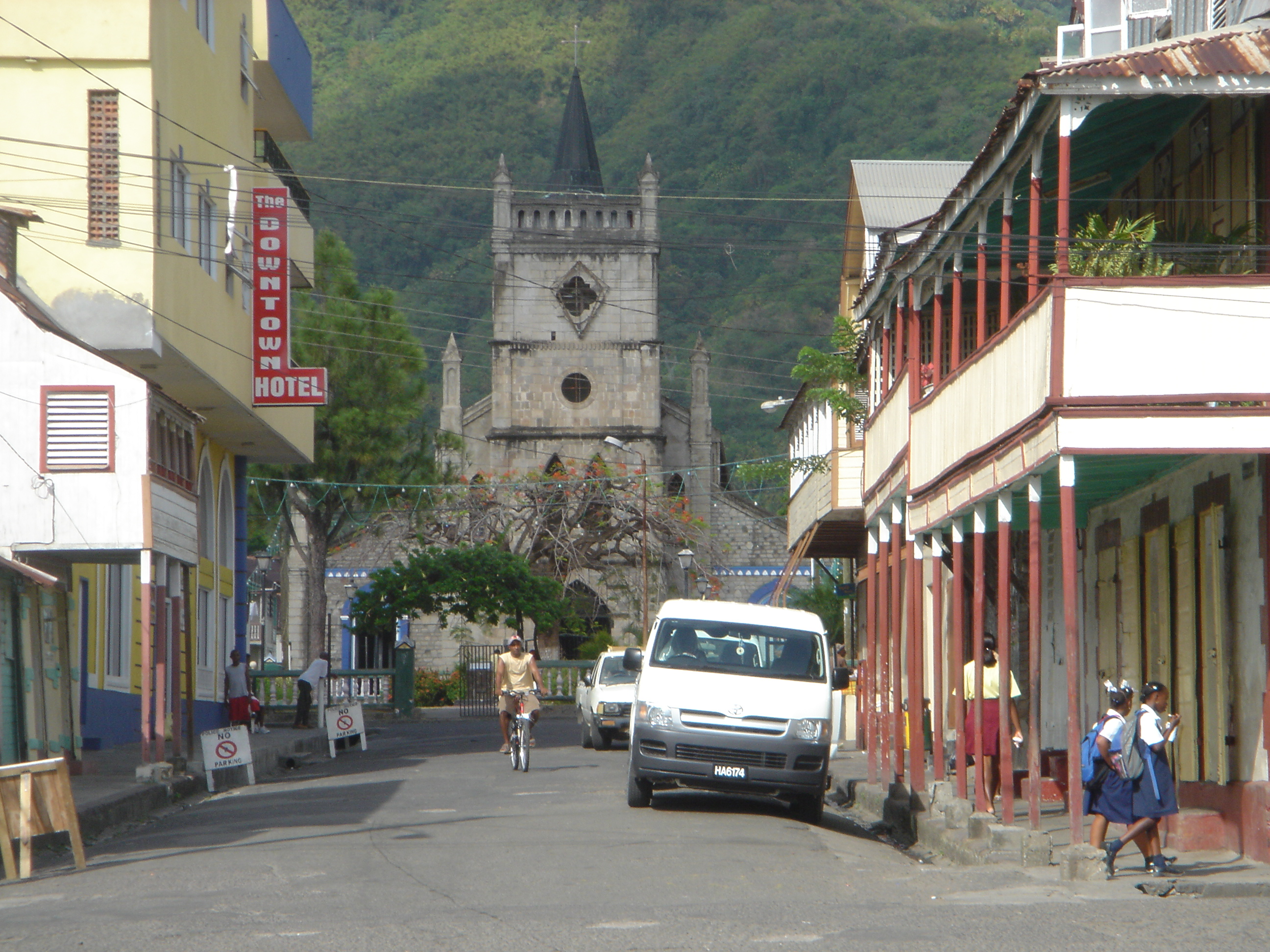
Catholic Church and Central square, Soufrière, April 2007

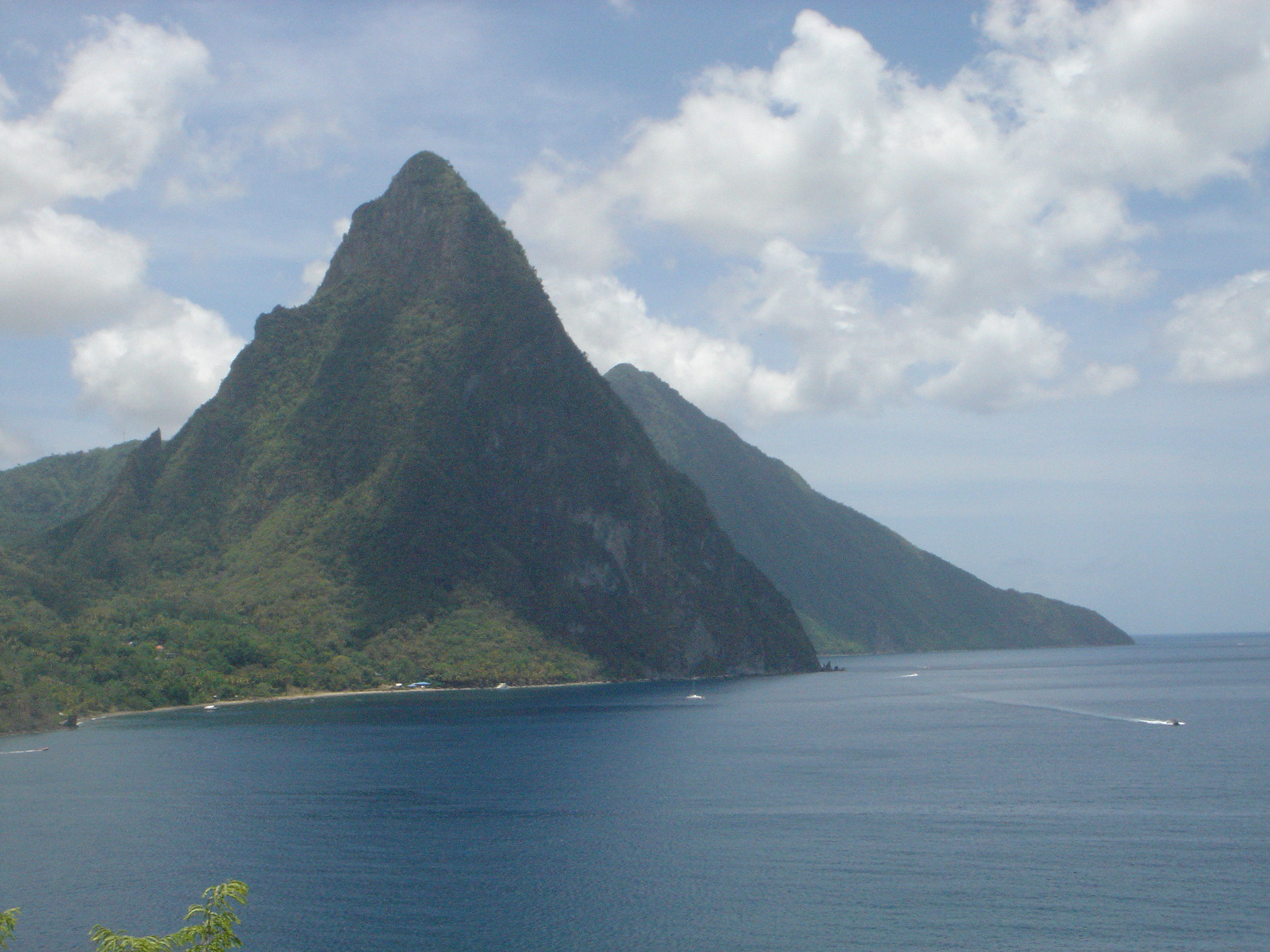
The Pitons at Soufrière

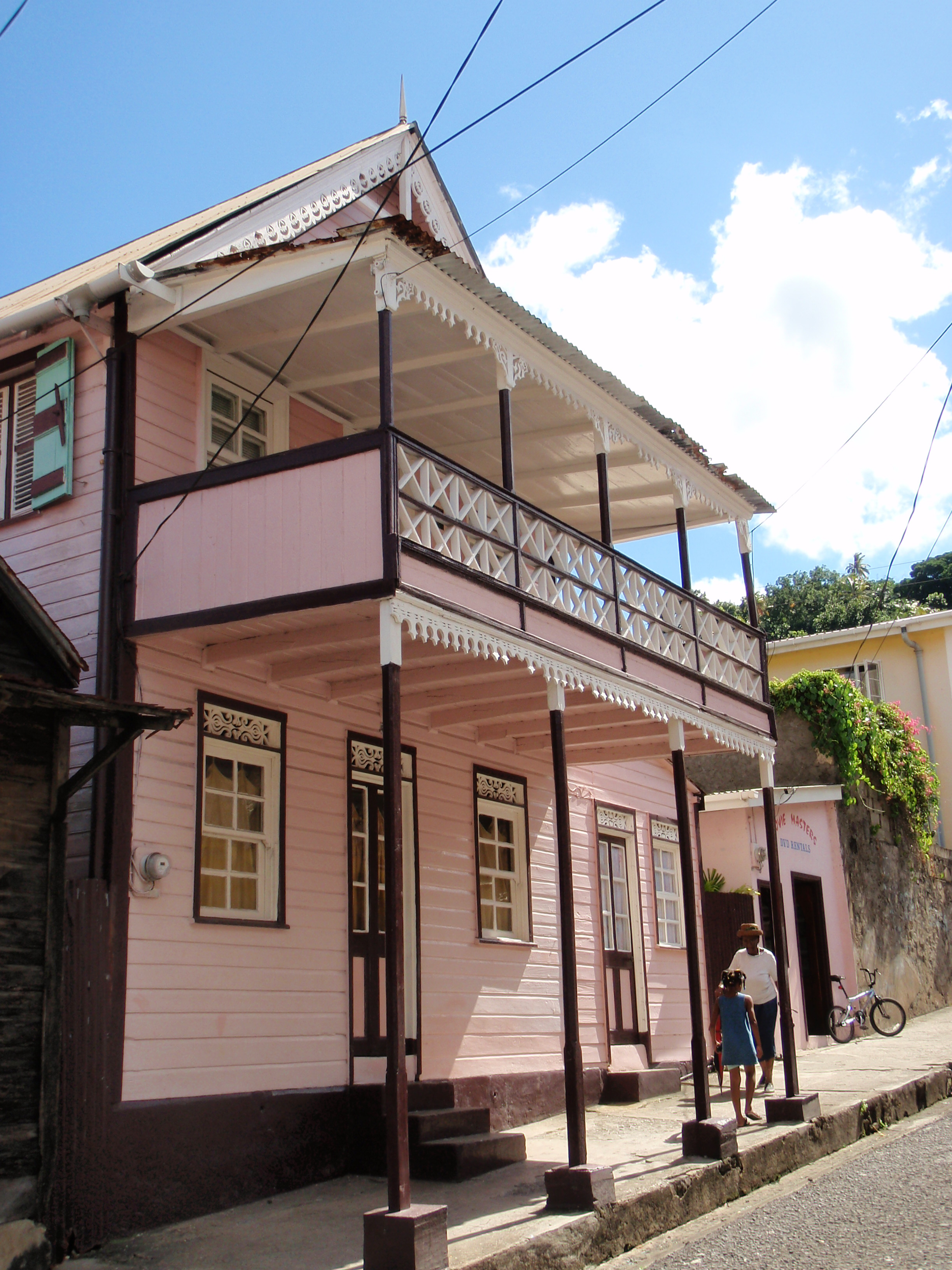
Soufriere

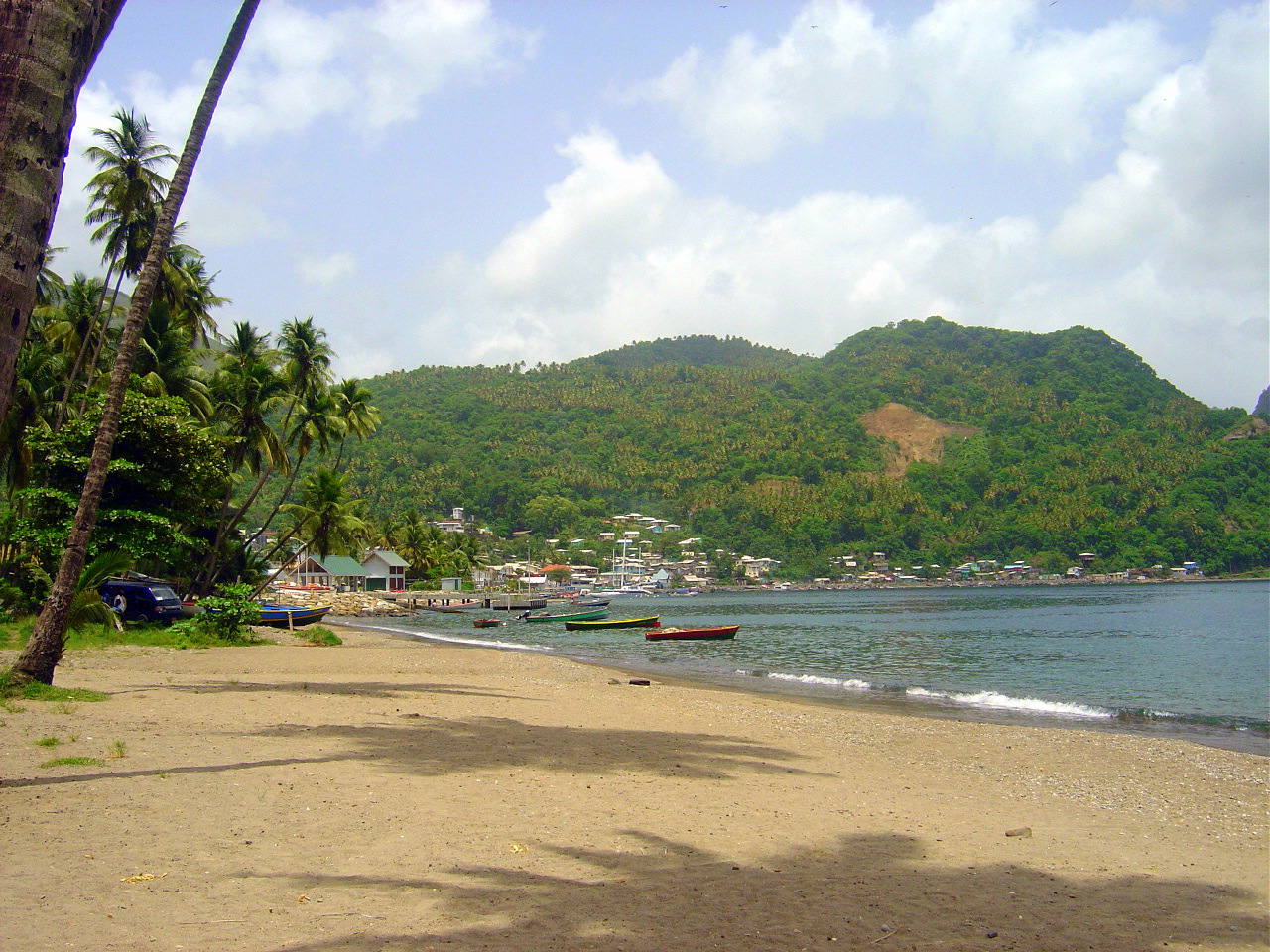
Soufrière Bay
