= St. Lucia Botanical Gardens =

Botanical gardens in St. Lucia

Coordinates: 13°51′09″N 61°02′54″W

St. Lucia Botanical Gardens, also known as the Diamond Botanical Gardens, is home of the Diamond Waterfall and the oldest botanical gardens on the island of St. Lucia. The botanical garden is located in the town of Soufrière, in the South-Western region of the island St. Lucia.

Baron de Laborie, Governor of St. Lucia, built Sulphur Baths in 1785, using funds sanctioned by King Louis XVI of France. Troops and invalids used the baths for medicinal purposes, comparing the waters to those found at Aix-la-Chapelle.

== Gallery ==
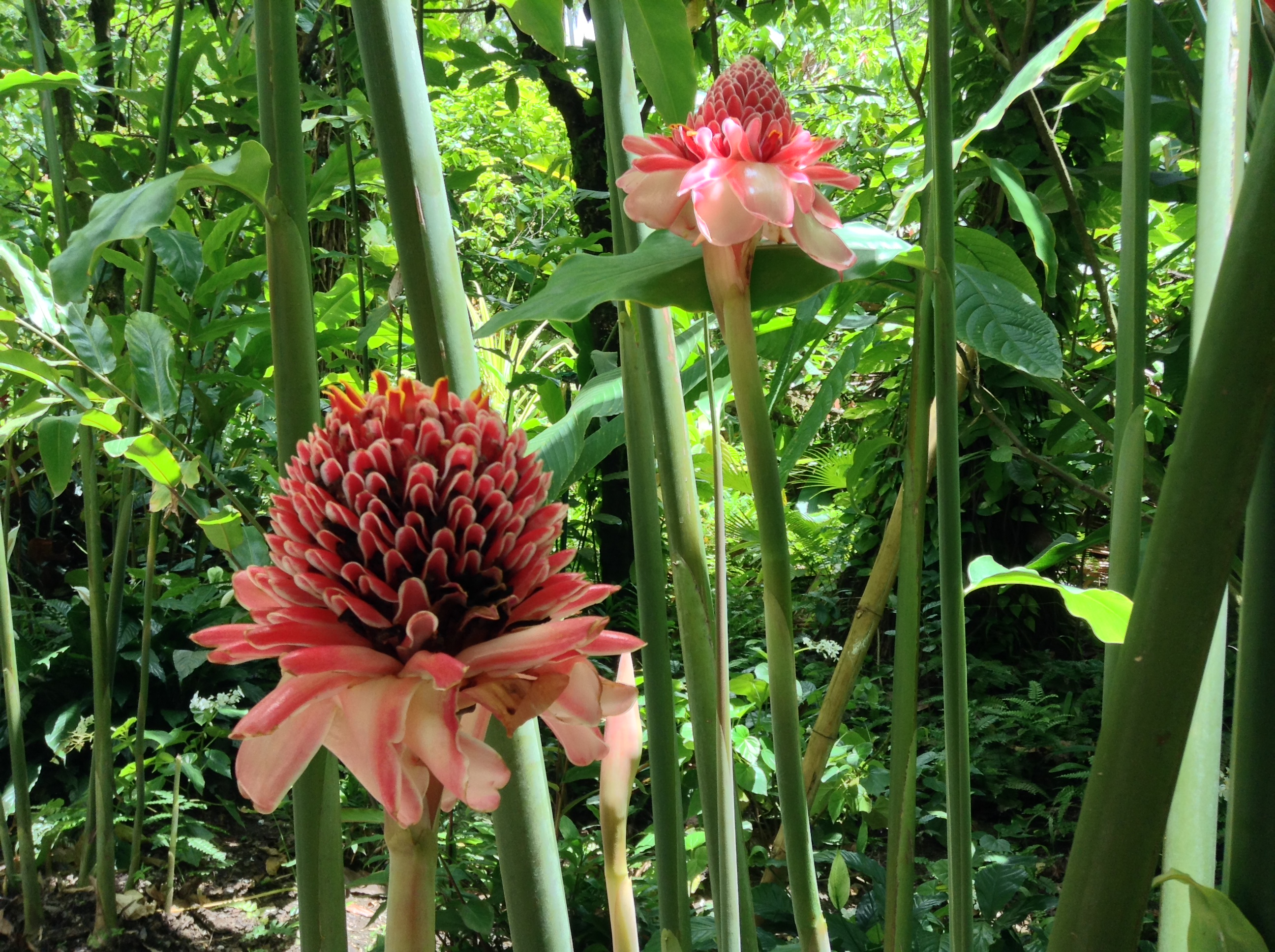
Etlingera elatior

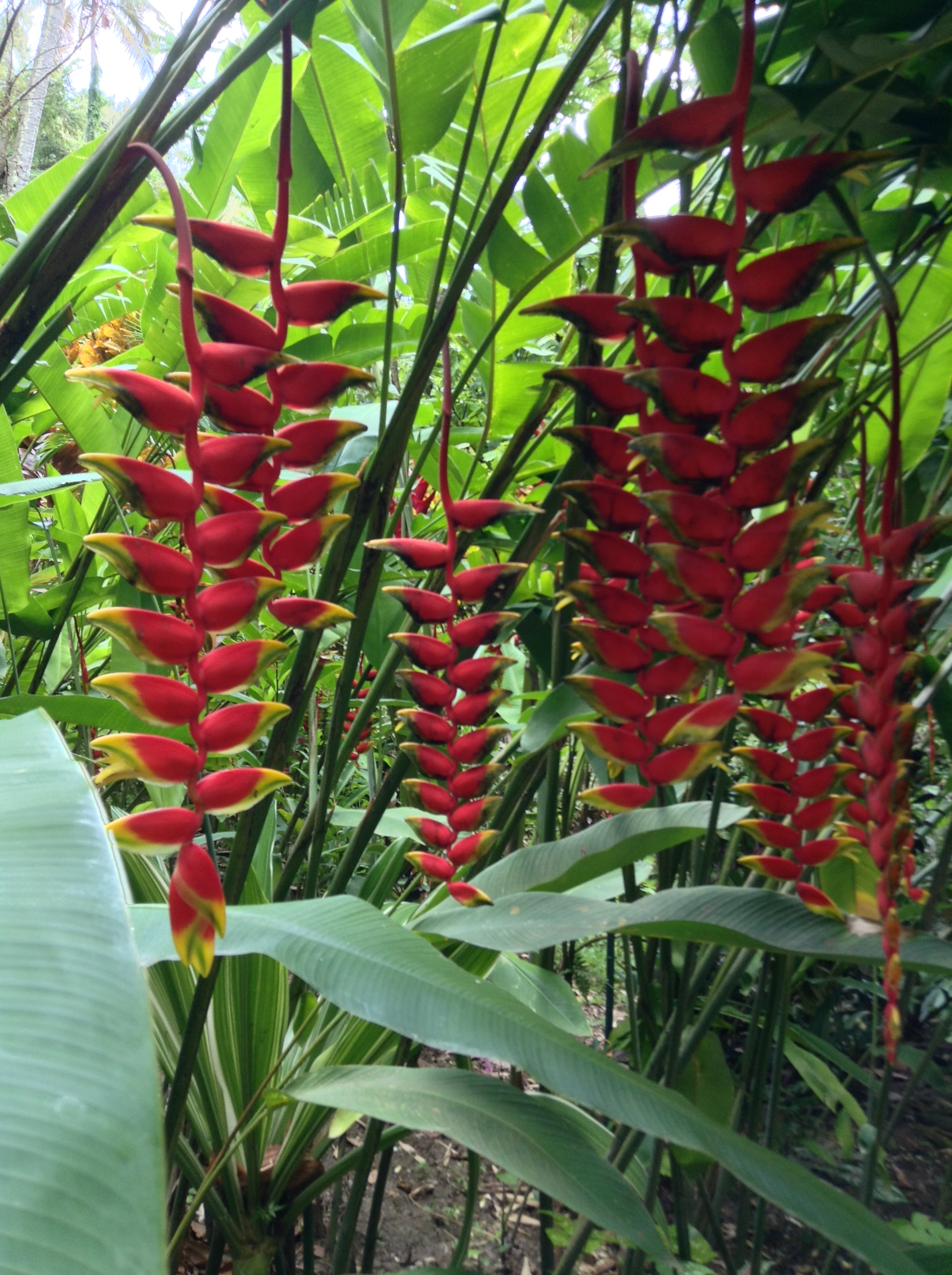
Heliconia rostrata

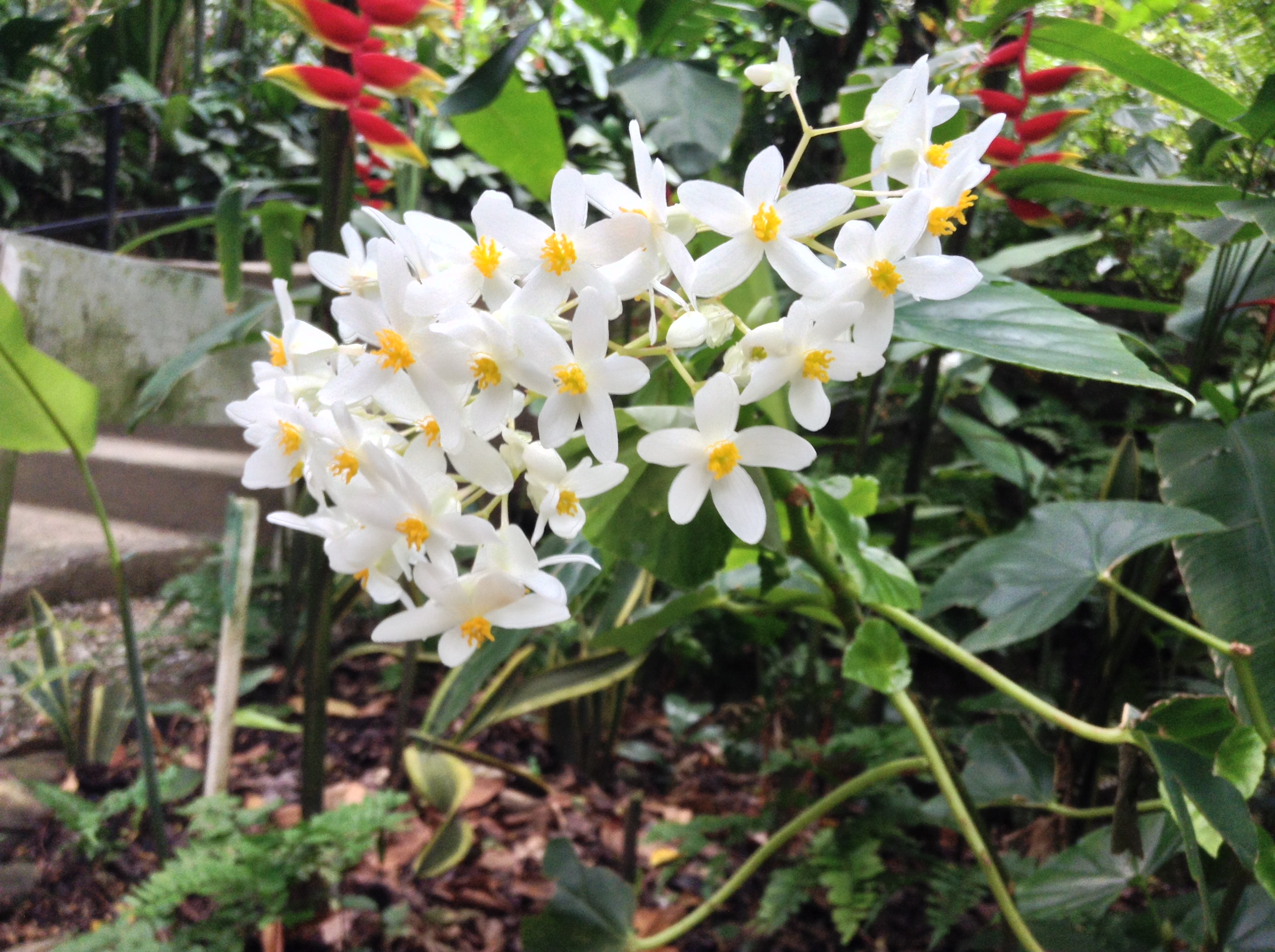
unknown species

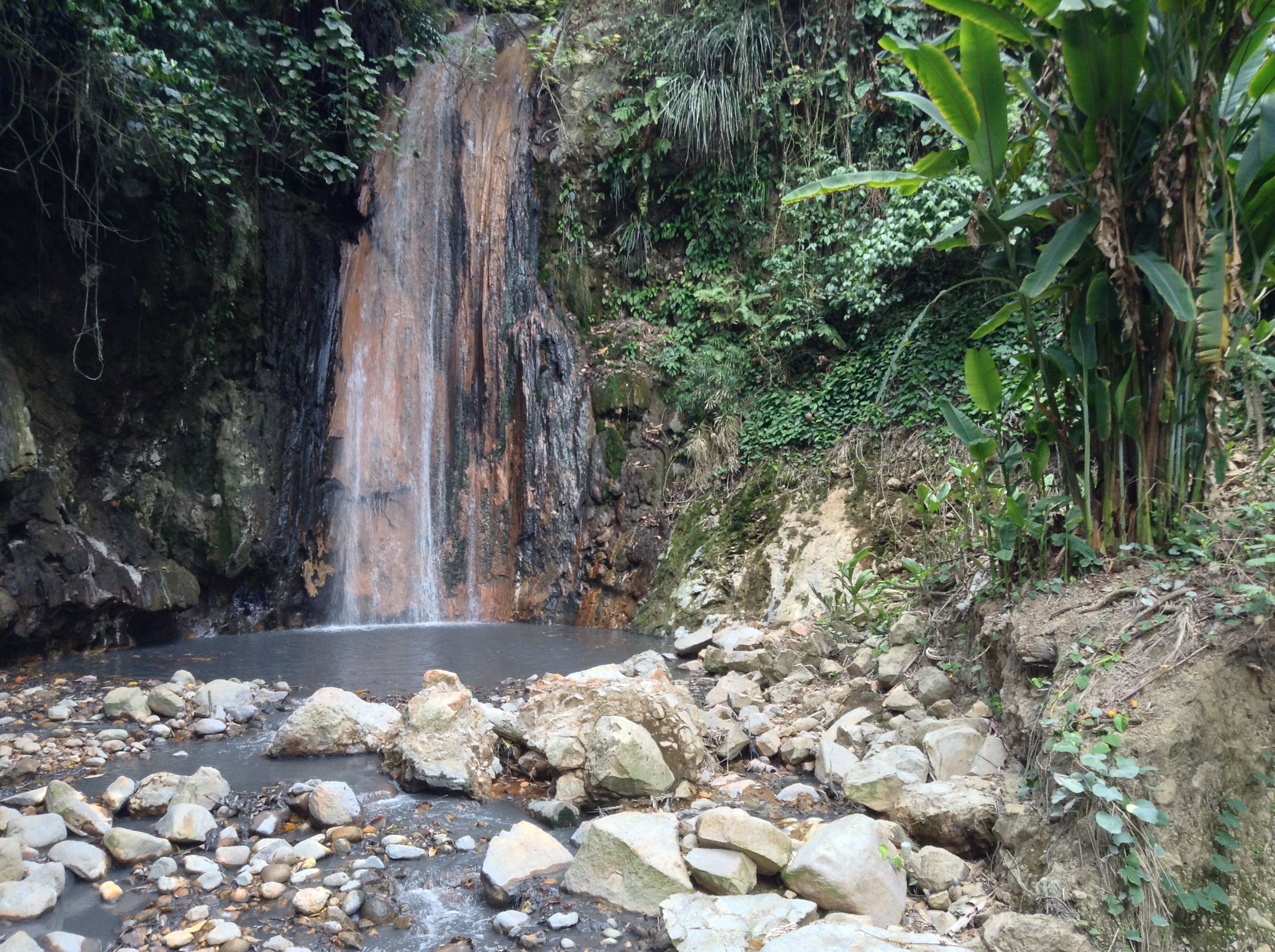
The waterfall

== See also ==
- Geography of Saint Lucia
