= Soufrière River =

River in Soufrière Quarter, Saint Lucia

Soufrière river
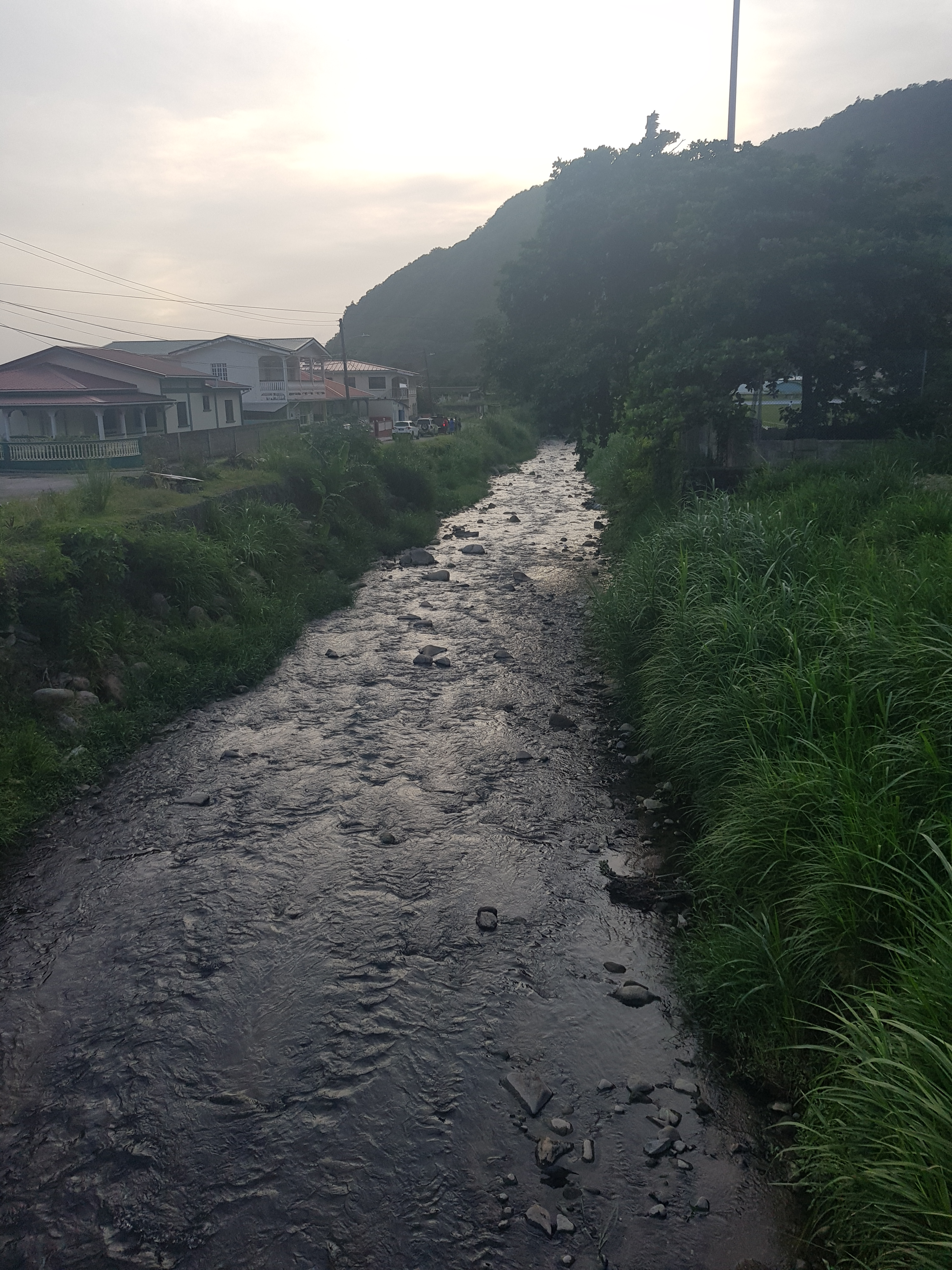

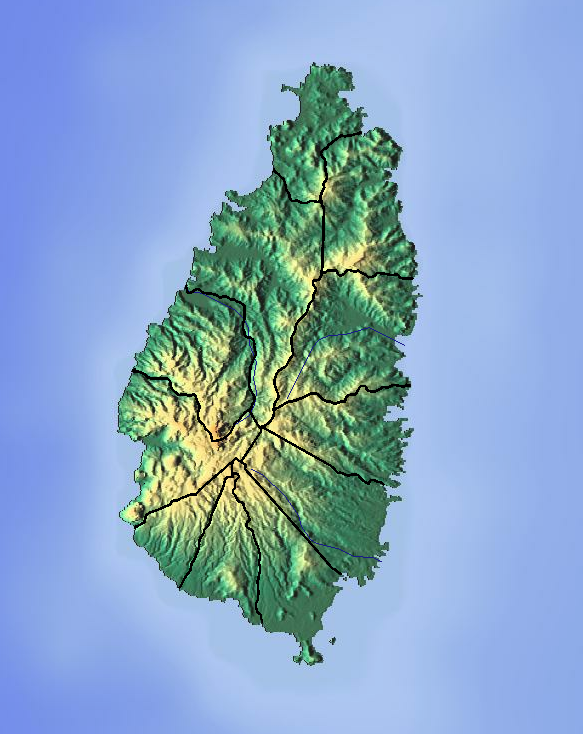
- Location of mouth

Location
- Country: Saint Lucia
- Region: Soufrière Quarter

Physical characteristics
- Mouth: Soufrière Bay, Caribbean Sea
  - location: Soufrière, Saint Lucia
  - coordinates: 13°51′21″N 61°03′38″W

The Soufrière River (French la Soufrière) is a river in the Soufrière Quarter on the island country of Saint Lucia. The French term "Soufrière" is a generic one referring to "Sulphury" volcanic peaks called La Soufrière or Soufrière Hills on each of St. Vincent, St. Lucia, Dominica, Guadeloupe.

== Course ==
The Soufrière River empties into Soufrière Bay on the Caribbean Sea. A river separates the town of Soufrière from the Fond Beniere area. A section of the river above the town was canalised and realigned in 1972; the river was realigned again in 1994.

Tributaries of the Soufrière River in the interior include the Jeremy and Migny rivers.

== See also ==
- List of rivers of Saint Lucia
