= Soufrière Estate =

Coordinates: 13.854008°N 61.058222°W

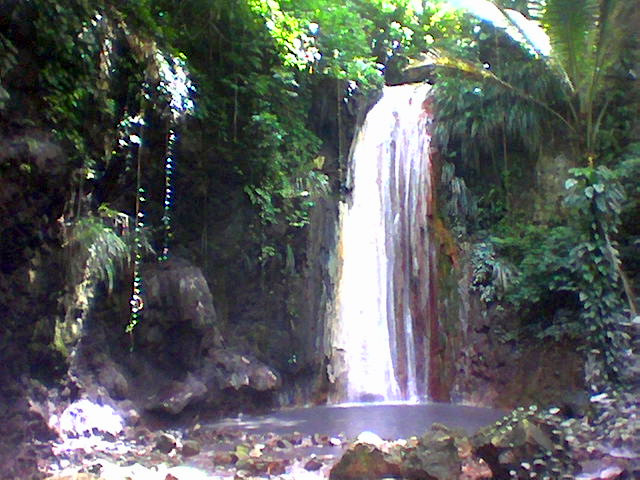
Diamond Falls

Soufrière Estate (jointly controlled with Diamond Estate), located on the Caribbean island of Saint Lucia, was originally established in 1713 as a 2,000-acre (8.1 km^{2}) estate granted to three Devaux brothers for services to King Louis XIV of France. Later on, mineral springs were discovered and were used as restorative baths by the French soldiers. In 1784, the Baron de Laborie, the French Governor of St Lucia, sent samples of the water to Paris for testing and it is believed to be good for rheumatism and skin complaints.

In the wars following the French Revolution, the baths fell into disuse and it was not until the 1930s when Andre duBoulay, the owner of Soufrière and Diamond Estates restored the baths for his private use. When his daughter Joan Devaux took over the management of the estate in 1983, she opened it up to the public seeing the tourism potential of the estate.

The Diamond Botanical Gardens (also known as the St. Lucia Botanical Gardens) is a 6-acre (24,000 m^{2}) area planted within the estate and includes Diamond Falls. There is a river running through the estate called Diamond River, it is black through the volcanic mud and there are mineral deposits on the river's banks.

There are also nature trails as well as a watermill constructed in 1765. It was originally built to crush sugar cane, but more recently it was used to provide hydroelectric power for Soufrière.
