= Pitons (Saint Lucia) =

Two mountainous volcanic plugs in Saint Lucia

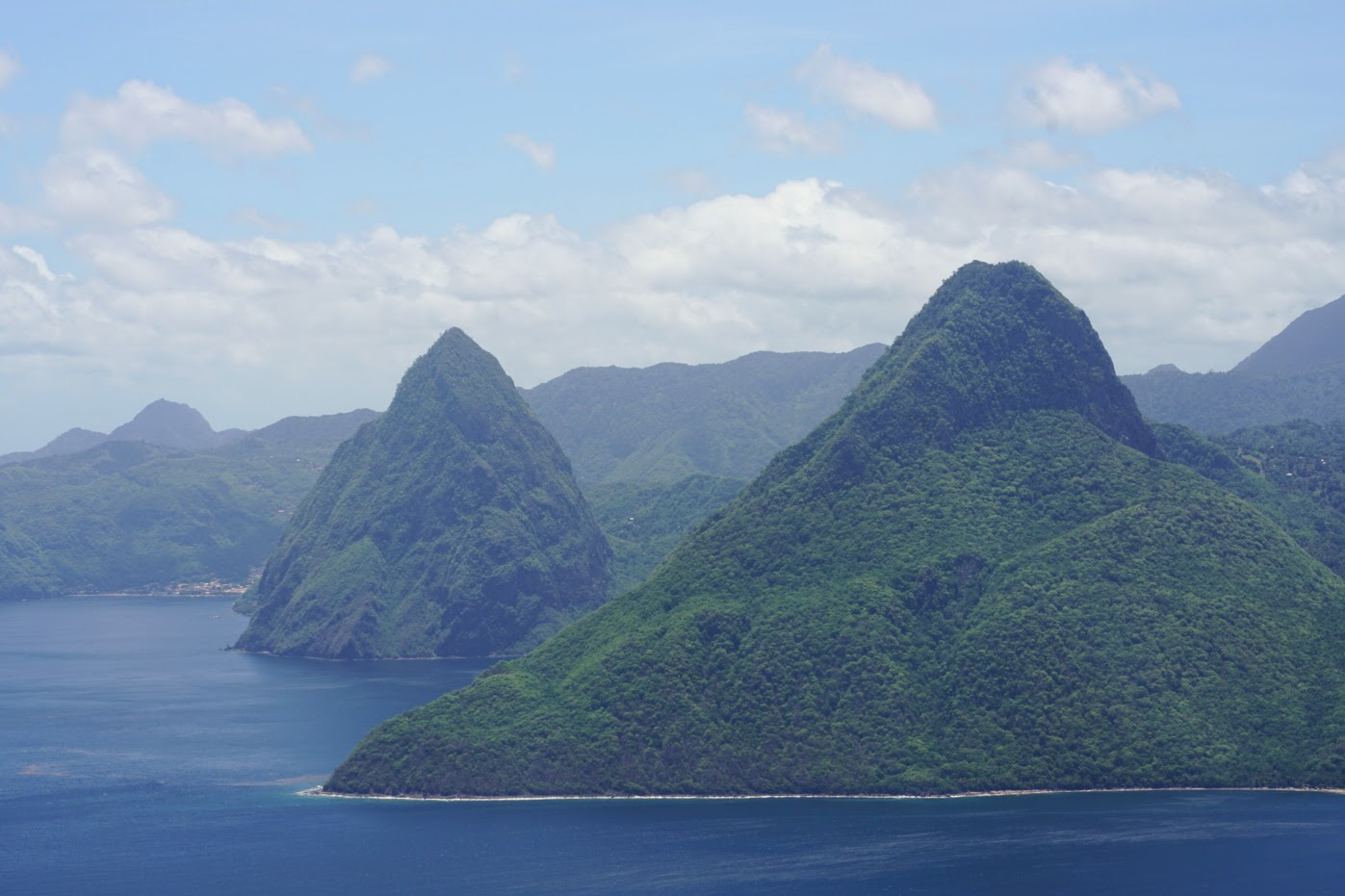
- Aerial view of the Pitons and the Caribbean Sea. Petit Piton depicted on the left; Gros Piton on the right.

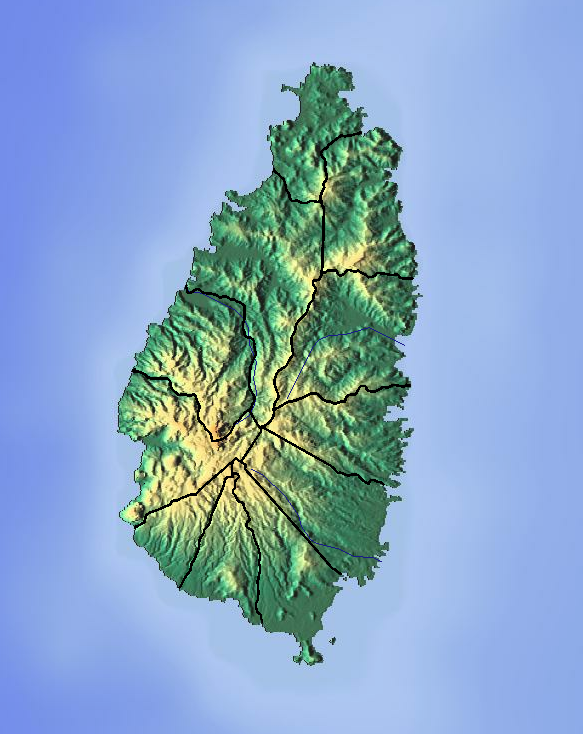
- Location within Saint Lucia
- Location: Soufrière District, Saint Lucia
- Nearest city: Soufrière and Choiseul
- Coordinates: 13°48′36″N 61°3′56″W

UNESCO World Heritage Site
- Type: Natural
- Criteria: vii, viii
- Designated: 2004 (28th session)
- Reference no.: 1161
- Region: Latin America and the Caribbean

The Pitons are two mountainous volcanic plugs, volcanic spires, located in Saint Lucia. Petit Piton is 743 m (2,438 ft) high and Gros Piton is 798.25 m (2,618.9 ft) high; they are linked by the Piton Mitan ridge. Piton means mountain peak in French, so Petit and Gros Piton respectively refer to the smaller and larger peak. The Pitons are a World Heritage Site, 2,909 ha (7,190 acres) in size, and located near the town of Soufrière.

== Geography ==
The Pitons are located between the towns of Soufrière and Choiseul on the southwestern coast of the island.

== Flora and fauna ==
The dominant terrestrial vegetation is tropical moist forest grading to subtropical wet forest, with small areas of dry forest and wet elfin woodland on the summits. At least 148 plant species have been recorded on Gros Piton, 97 on Petit Piton and the intervening ridge, among them eight rare tree species.

Gros Piton is home to some 27 bird species (five of them endemic), three indigenous rodents, one opossum, three bats, eight reptiles, and three amphibians. The site has been designated an Important Bird Area (IBA) by BirdLife International.

== Geology ==
The volcanic complex includes a geothermal field with sulphurous fumaroles and hot springs.

== Gros Piton ==
Gros Piton is at the southern end of Pitons Bay. It is the second-highest peak on Saint Lucia, after Mount Gimie.

Gros Piton can be climbed without ropes or mountaineering experience. One can hike to the summit and come back down to sea level within several hours. Local guides are provided by the National Park and are included with your entry fee. They are trained by the government to have basic knowledge of the languages common among tourists and of the medical procedures required in case of common accidents.

== Petit Piton ==
Petit Piton lies towards the middle of Soufrière Bay, south of Soufrière and north of Gros Piton.

Petit Piton was first climbed in 1878 by Abdome Deligny. The islands of Dominica, Martinique, Barbados, and St. Vincent can be seen from its peak.

== In popular culture ==
Saint Lucia's local brand of beer made by the Windward & Leeward Brewery is named after the Pitons.

Both mountains are an attraction for hikers. The Gros Piton peak is more popular since it is an easier climb and tours are offered by The Soufrière Foundation, a non-profit group that is dedicated to helping preserve the Pitons Management Area.

According to the Arawaks, they see the Pitons as a family unit. The father figure is Gros Piton, the mother is Petit Piton, and the child is Petit-Petit Piton, a spur that juts from the flank of Petit Piton.

== Gallery ==
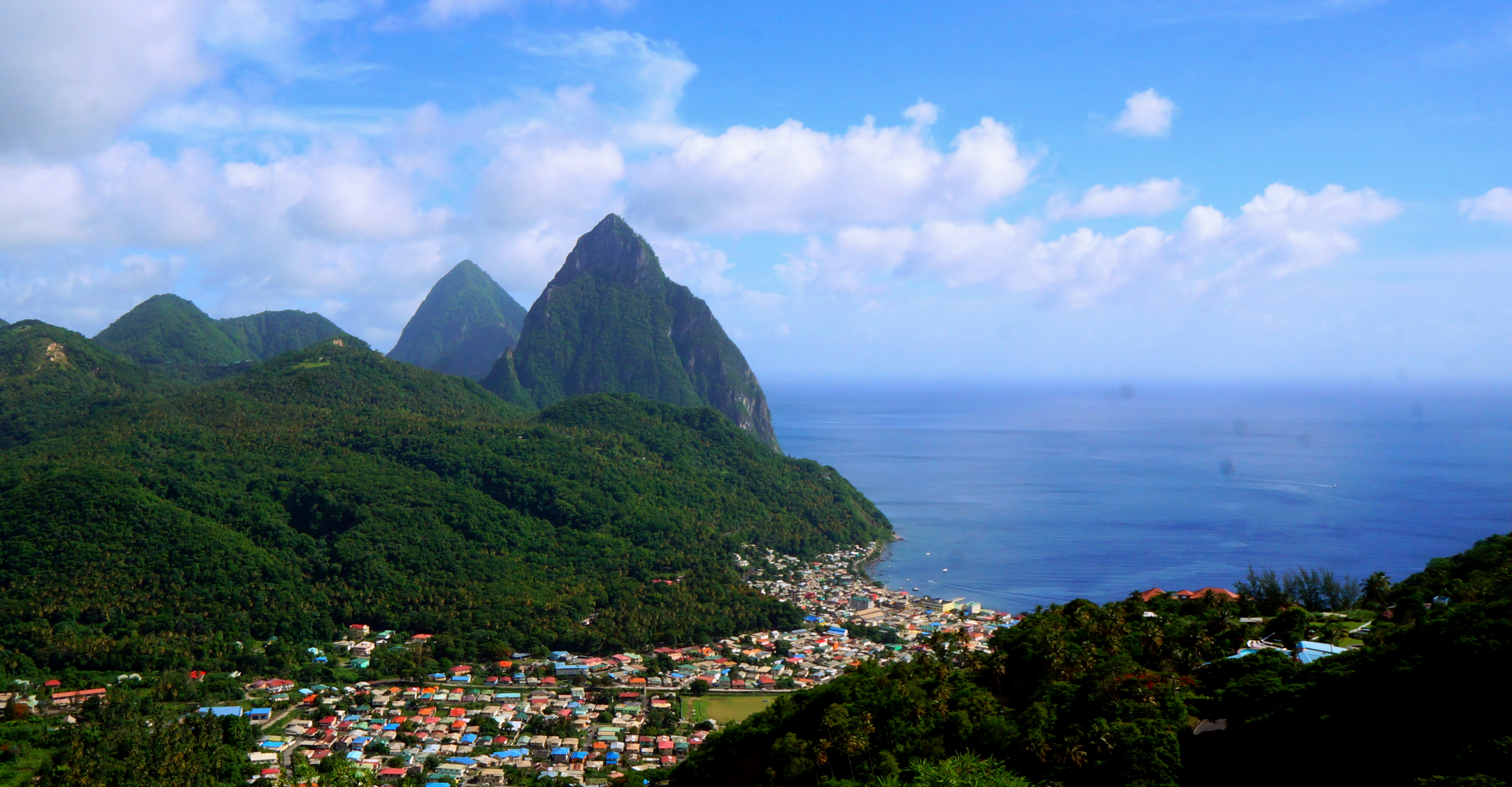
The Pitons, Soufrière, and the Caribbean Sea

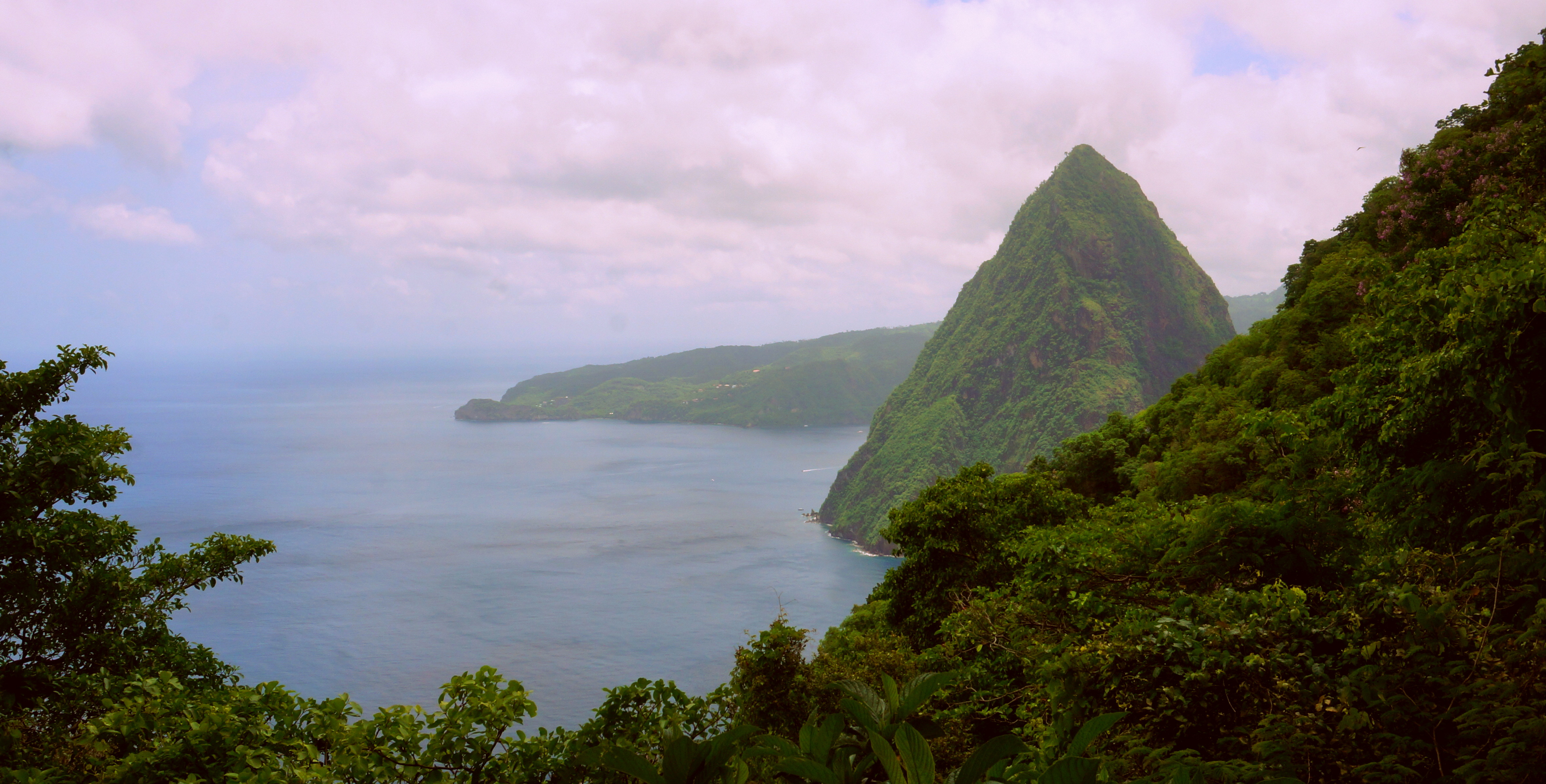
Petit Piton from Gros Piton

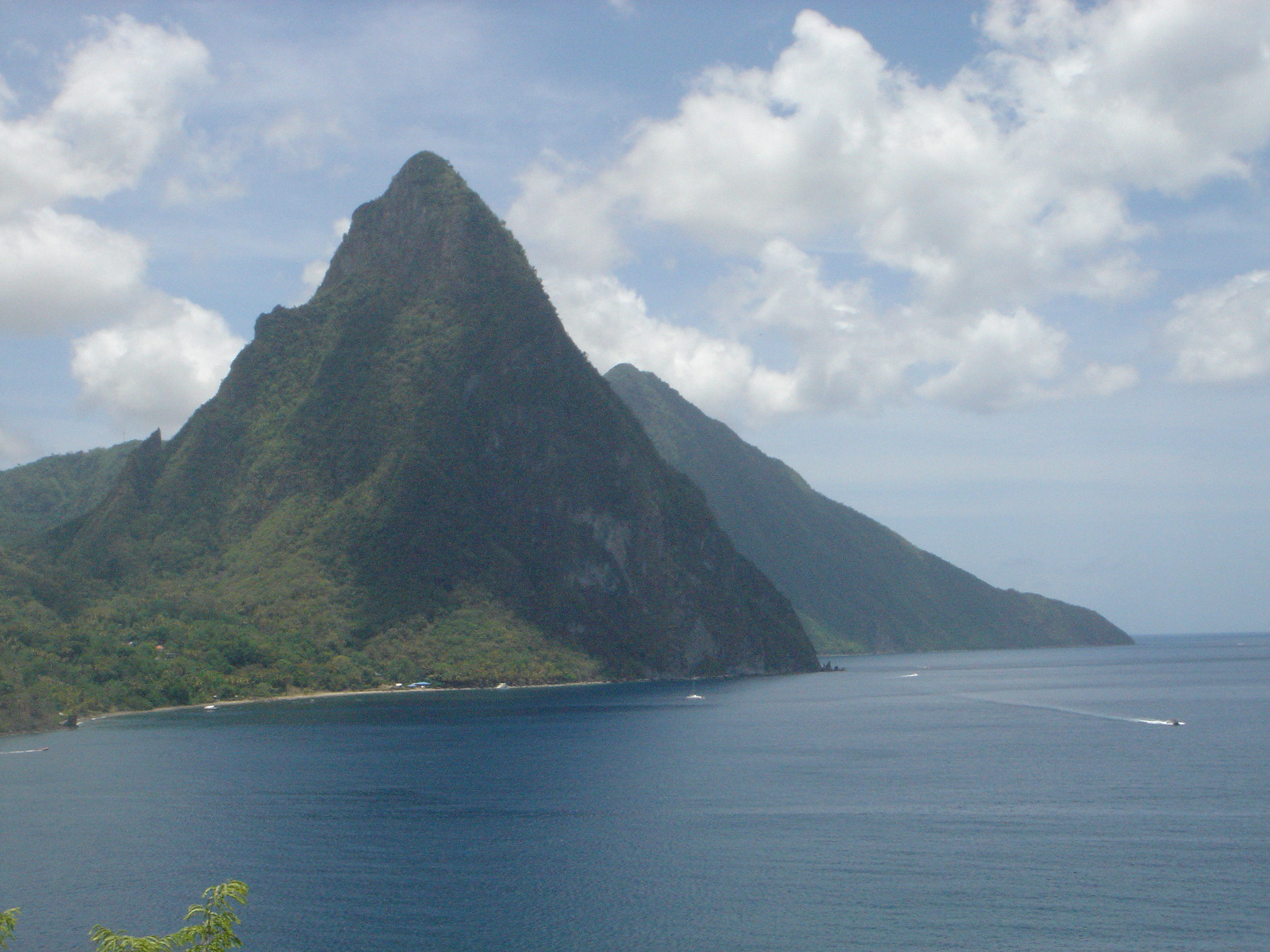
Pitons from the northern viewpoint

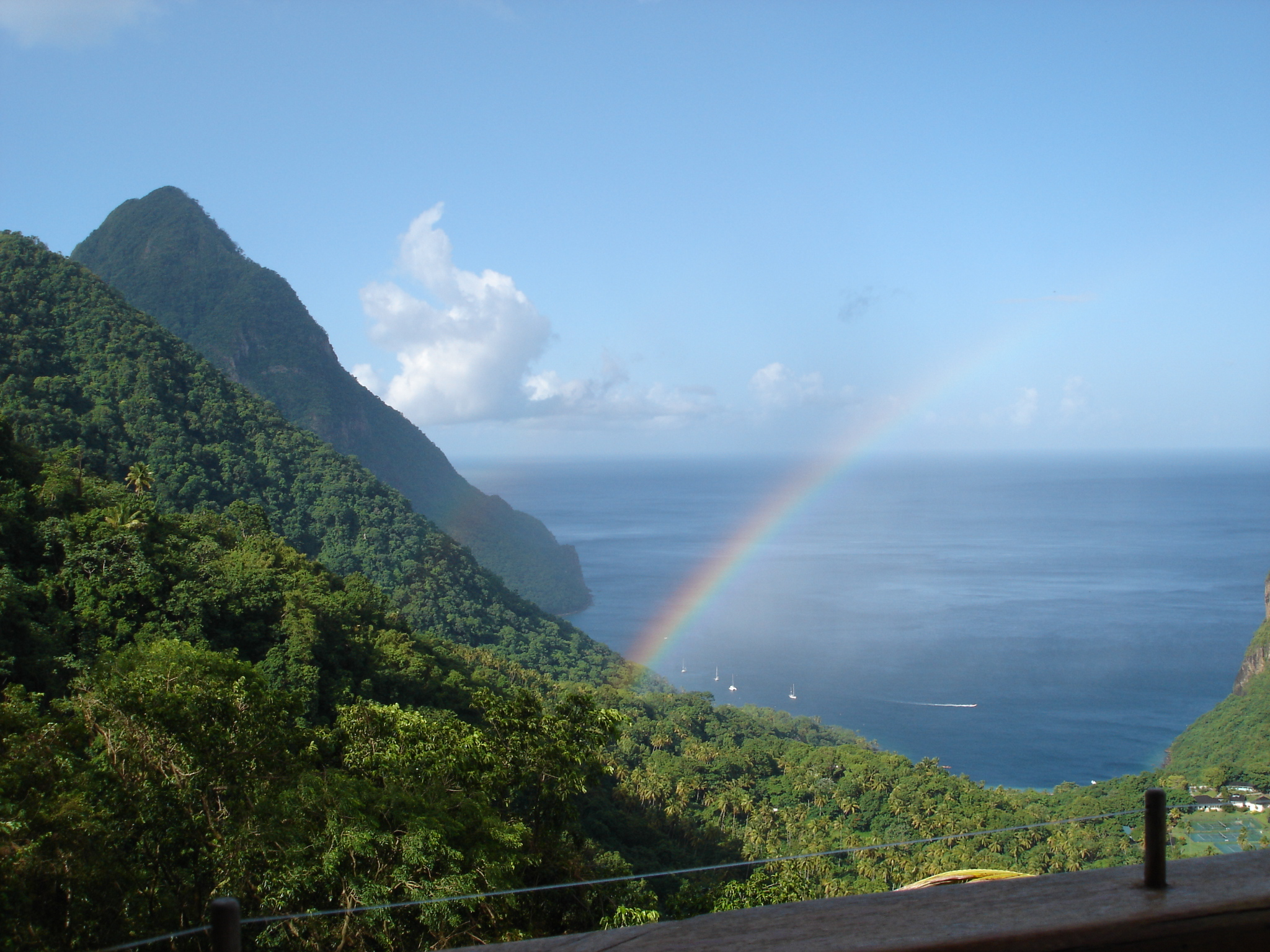
Gros Piton seen from the Piton Mitan ridge

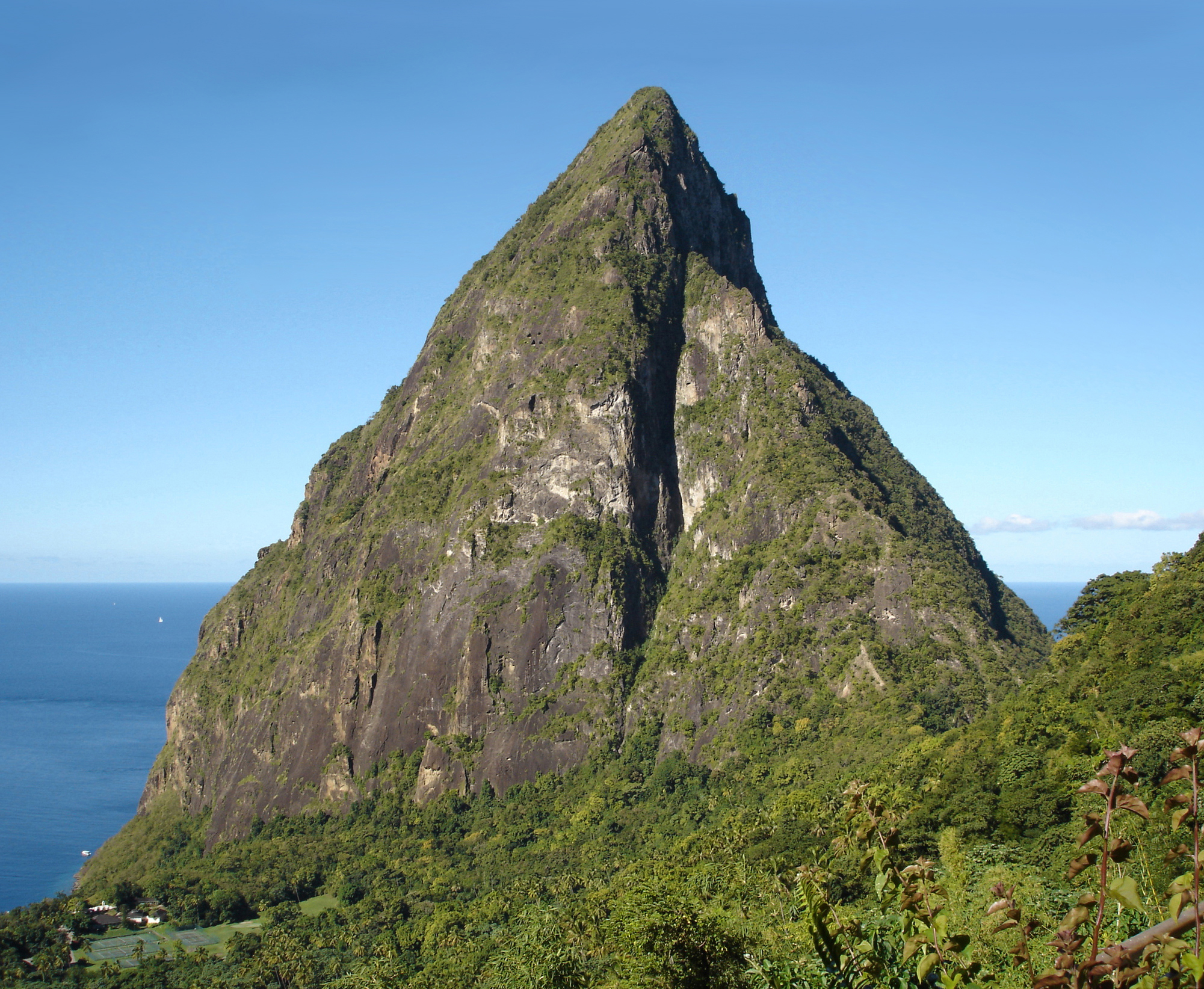
Petit Piton seen from the Piton Mitan ridge

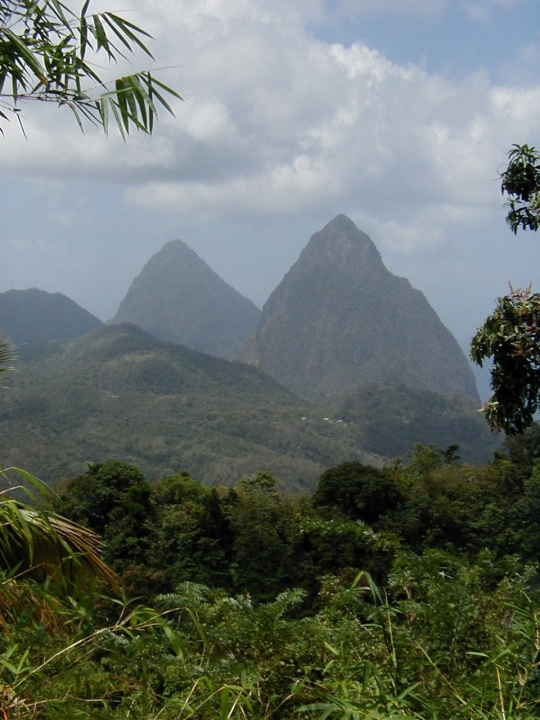
Gros Piton (left) and Petit Piton seen from the north-east

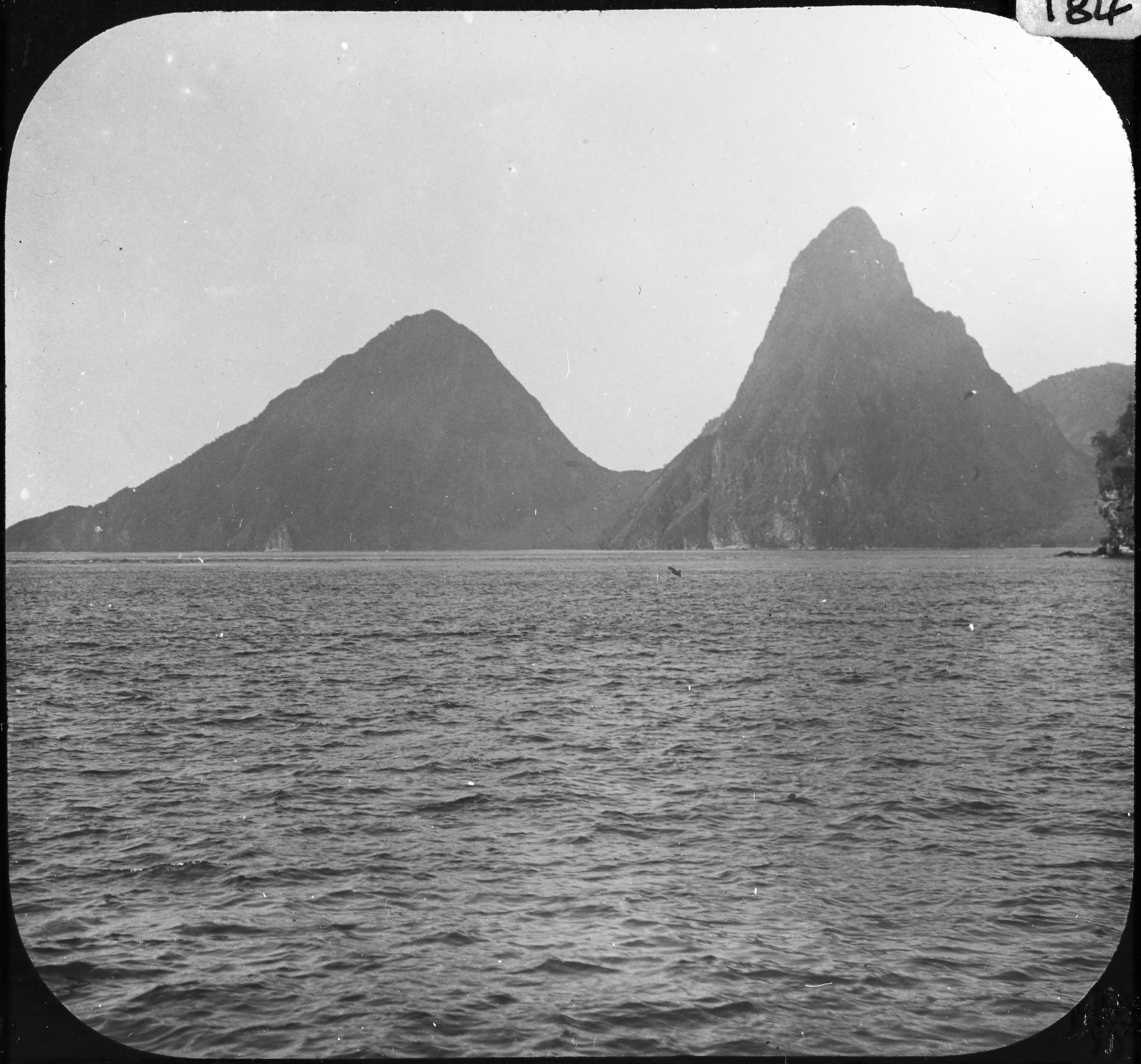
Pitons in 1903

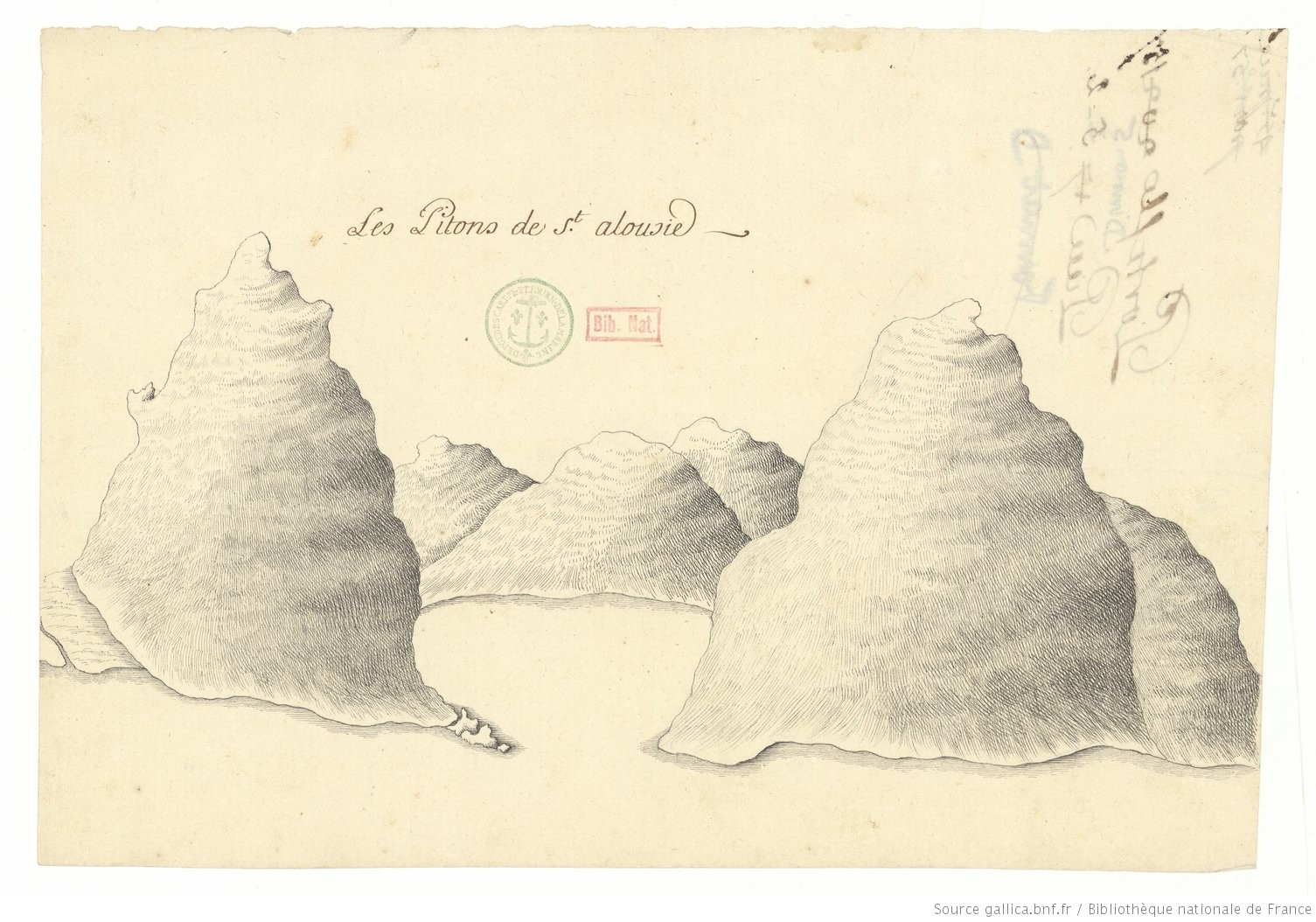
St Lucia Pitons drawing from 17th - 18th century

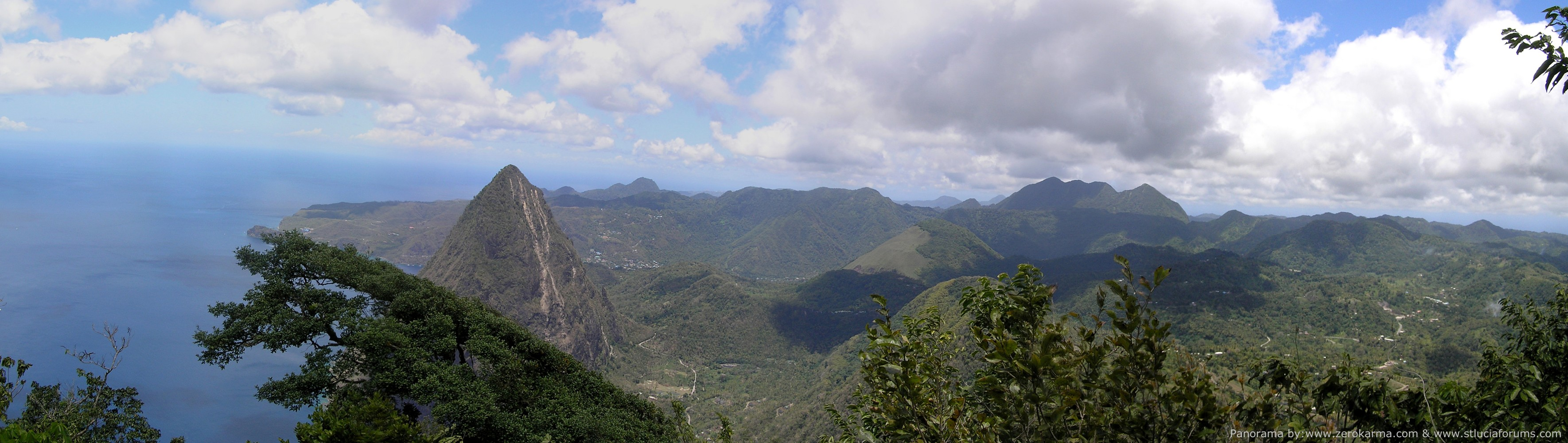
Panorama View from the top of Gros Piton, looking north. Gives a view of the Petit Piton and northern St. Lucia.

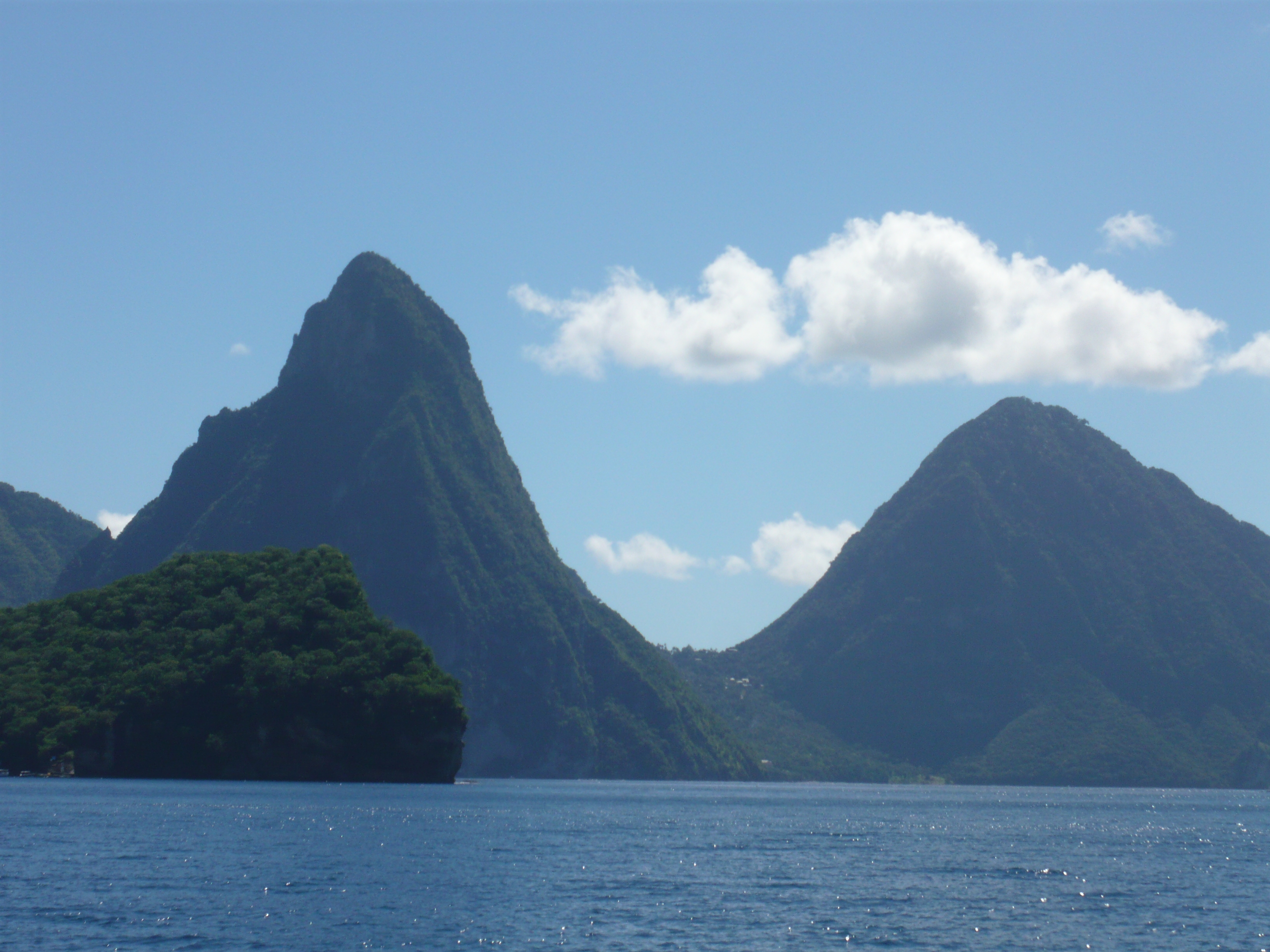
Pitons from the ocean

== See also ==
- Geography of Saint Lucia
