= Qualibou =

Mountain in Saint Lucia

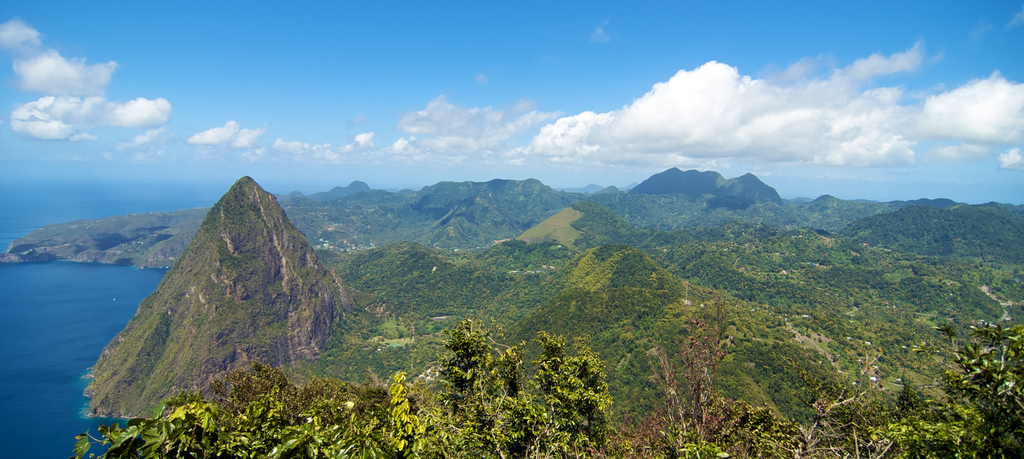
- View from Gros Piton over the Qualibou caldera

Highest point
- Elevation: 777 m (2,549 ft)
- Coordinates: 13.838°N 61.046°W

Geography
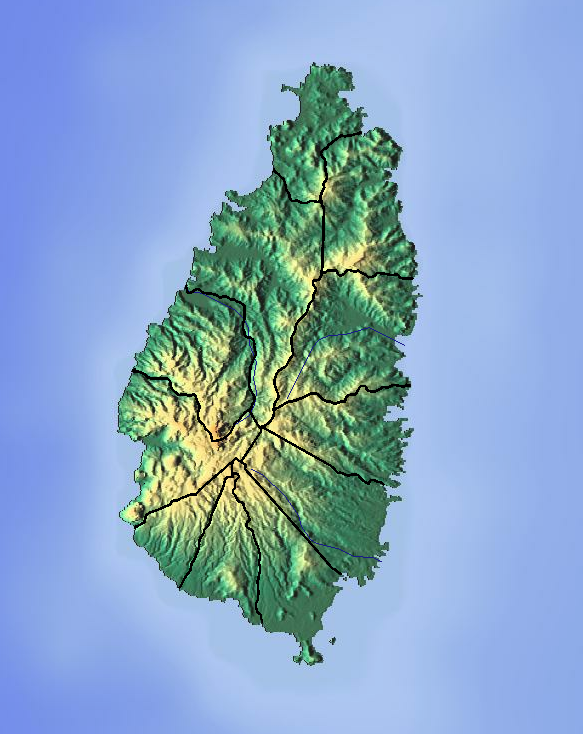
- Location within Saint Lucia
- Location: Saint Lucia, Caribbean

Geology
- Rock age: 32,000–39,000 years
- Mountain type: Caldera
- Last eruption: 1766

Qualibou, also known as the Soufrière Volcanic Center, is a 3.5 × 5 km-wide caldera on the island of Saint Lucia that formed between 32,000 and 39,000 years ago. This eruption also formed the Choiseul Tuff which covers the southeastern portion of the island.

The Pitons are two large lava domes that formed 200 to 300,000 years ago, before the formation of the caldera; ever since then, other domes have filled the caldera floor. There was a phreatic eruption in 1766 that deposited volcanic ash over a wide area.

Sulphur Springs is an active geothermal area located roughly in the center of the caldera.

In 1990, 1999 and 2000 there were shallow volcanic earthquakes located 6 km ESE of the caldera.

== Gallery ==
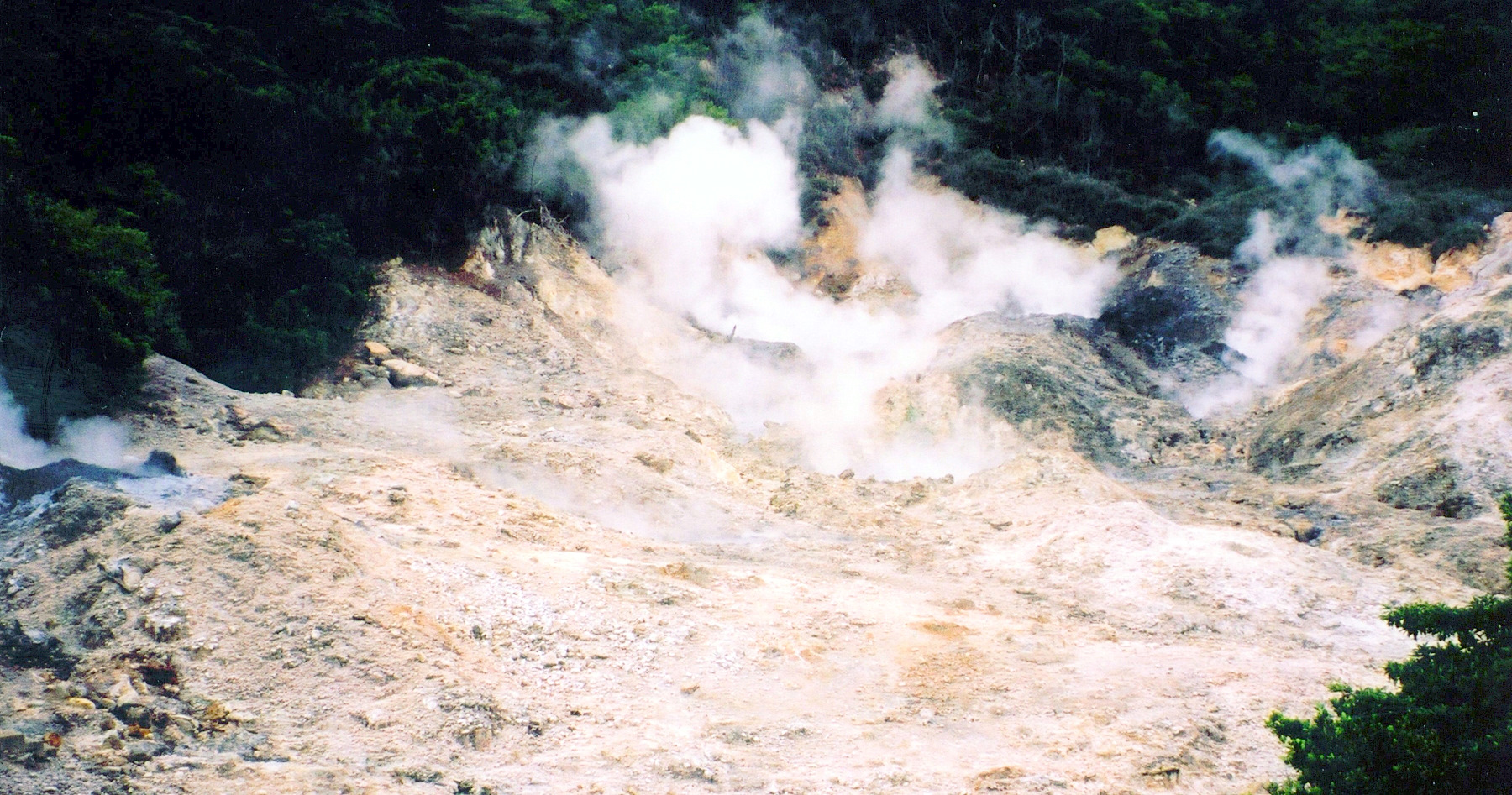
Sulphur Springs

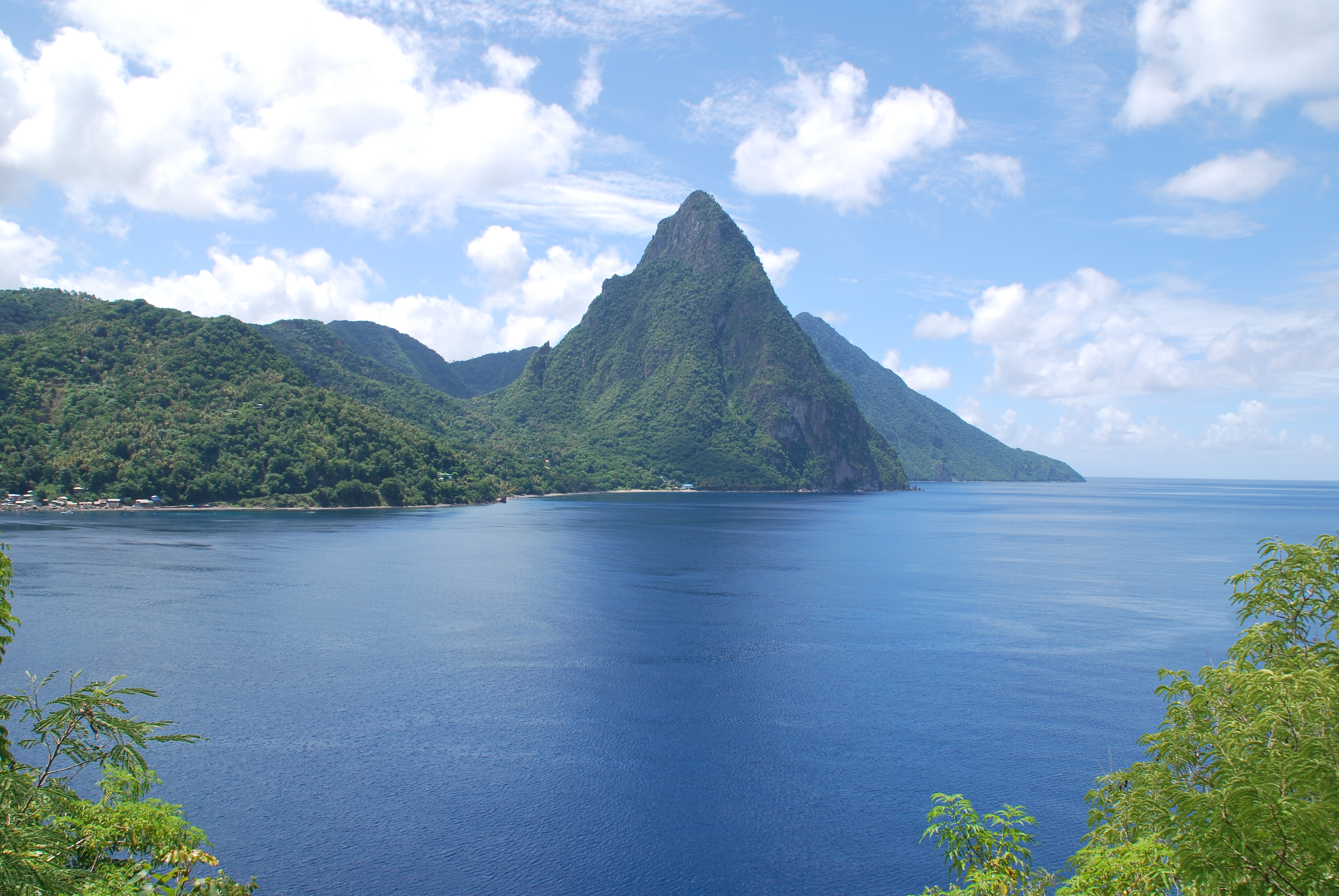
Petit Piton

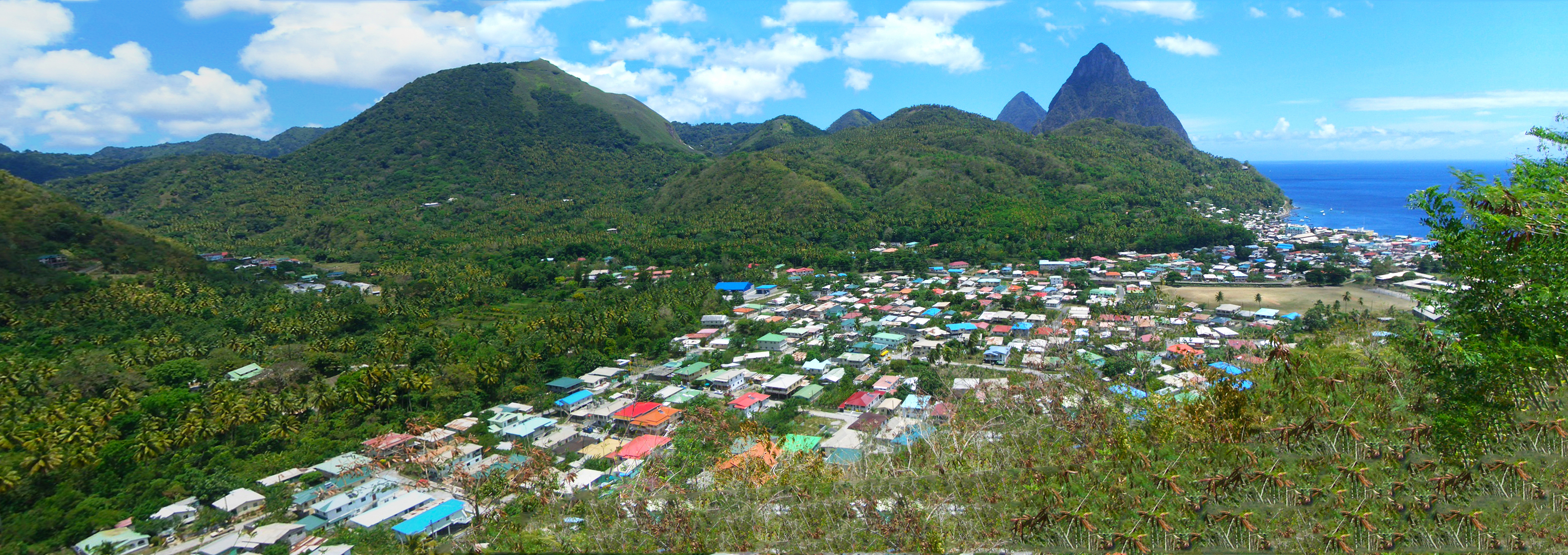
Soufrière and the Pitons
