= Soufrière, Saint Lucia =

Soufrière
- Town
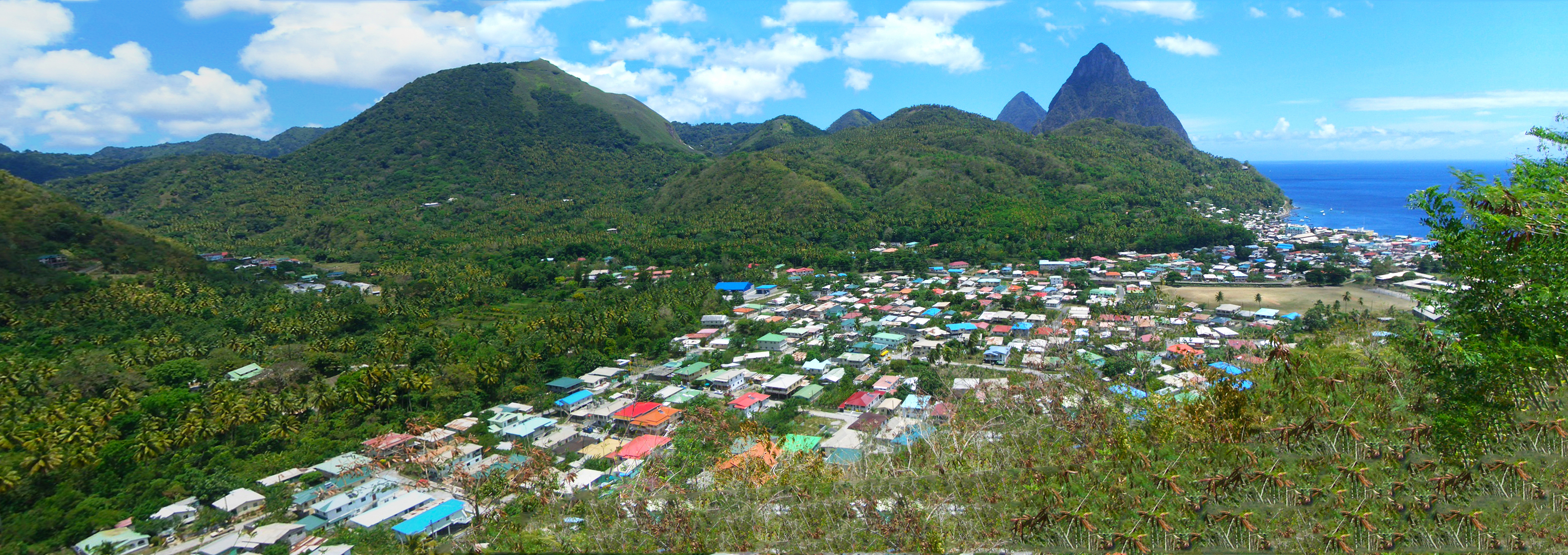
- Soufrière and the Pitons

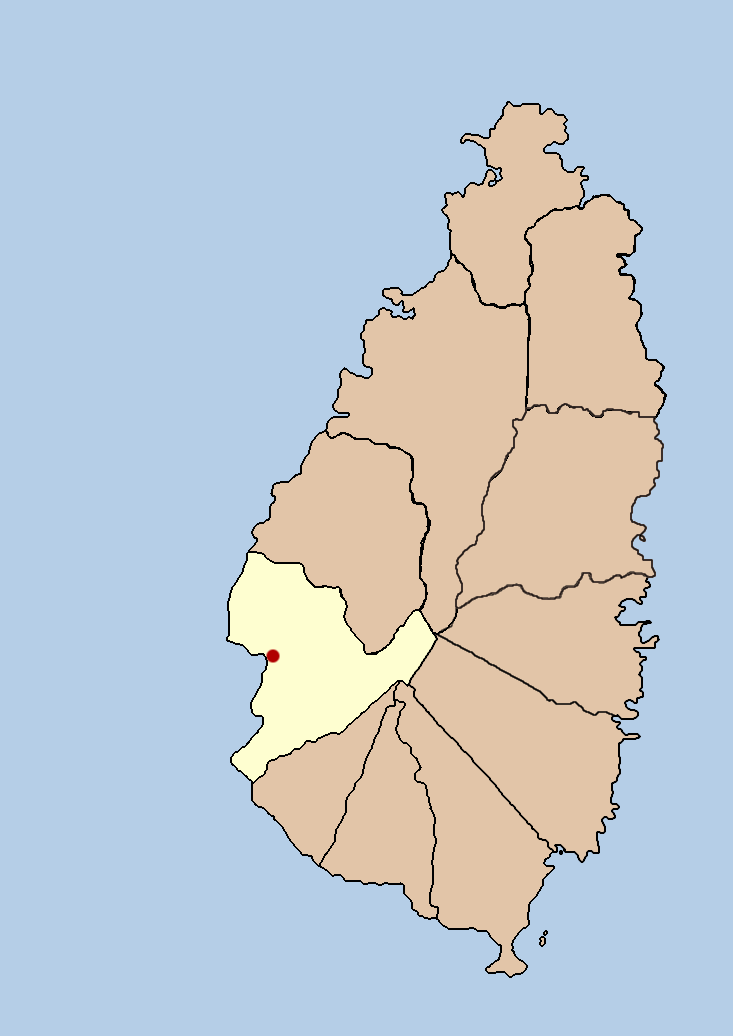
- Political map of Saint Lucia showing Soufrière
- Coordinates: 13.854°N 61.0592°W
- Country: Saint Lucia
- Quarter: Soufrière Quarter
- Founded: 18th century
- Founder: France
- Named for: The local volcano

Government
  - Governing body: Soufrière Council
  - Mayor: Joan Hippolyte
- Elevation: 5 m (16 ft)

Population (2005)
  - Total: 7,935 (Soufrière District)
- Time zone: UTC-4 (Eastern Caribbean Time Zone (ECT))
- Area code: 758

Soufrière is a town on the West Coast of Saint Lucia, in the eastern Caribbean Sea. The town and the surrounding district has a population of 7,935. It was colonized by the French and was the original capital of the island.

== History ==
French colonialists built large estates in Soufrière, and their descendants still live in the area. The French Revolution of 1789 resulted in many Royalists being executed and the enslaved Africans were released from enslavement. However, Napoleon reintroduced slavery when he came to power.

The British invaded St Lucia shortly afterwards, but the enslaved Africans and French deserters fought them in a guerrilla campaign until 1803 when they were defeated and St Lucia became a British colony. Also, during that time, Castries became the capital of St Lucia.

Over the years, Soufrière has had to deal with hurricanes in 1780, 1817, 1831, 1898 and 1980, a major fire in 1955 and an earthquake in 1991. Many of these events have resulted in the town being rebuilt.

Soufrière inhabitants have included the future Empress of France Joséphine de Beauharnais (who spent much of her childhood in the area), and George Charles (the first Premier of St Lucia). When Queen Elizabeth II visited St Lucia in 1966, she landed at Soufrière rather than Castries.

Today, Soufrière is more dependent on tourism rather than agriculture. The Pitons are just south of the town and there are several attractions in the area. Many of the old estates are still there such as Soufrière Estate, Fond Doux Estate and Rabot Estate.

== Tourism ==
- The Pitons – Gros Piton and Petit Piton are two giant volcanic plugs located south of Soufrière and are a UNESCO World Heritage Site.
- Sulphur Springs – Soufrière is located within the caldera of the dormant Qualibou volcano and the area is geothermally active. It is marketed as a drive-through volcano, and there are numerous hot springs and fumaroles.
- Soufrière Estate – also known as Diamond Estate, this is an old colonial estate that is home to a botanical garden, sulphur baths and Diamond Falls.
- Fond Doux Estate – a working plantation where cacao is still processed.
- St Lucia's Rainforest – there are several rainforest trails in the area with views, wildlife and waterfalls such as the Enbas Saut Falls.
- Anse Chastanet – a resort with a beach and several trails along the coast.
- Volga Nature Trail - a hiking trail with views of both pitons up close with views of Sugar beach.

== In popular culture ==
Soufrière was the filming location for most of the 1985 film Water, set on the fictional British colony of Cascara.

== Image gallery of the town of Soufrière ==
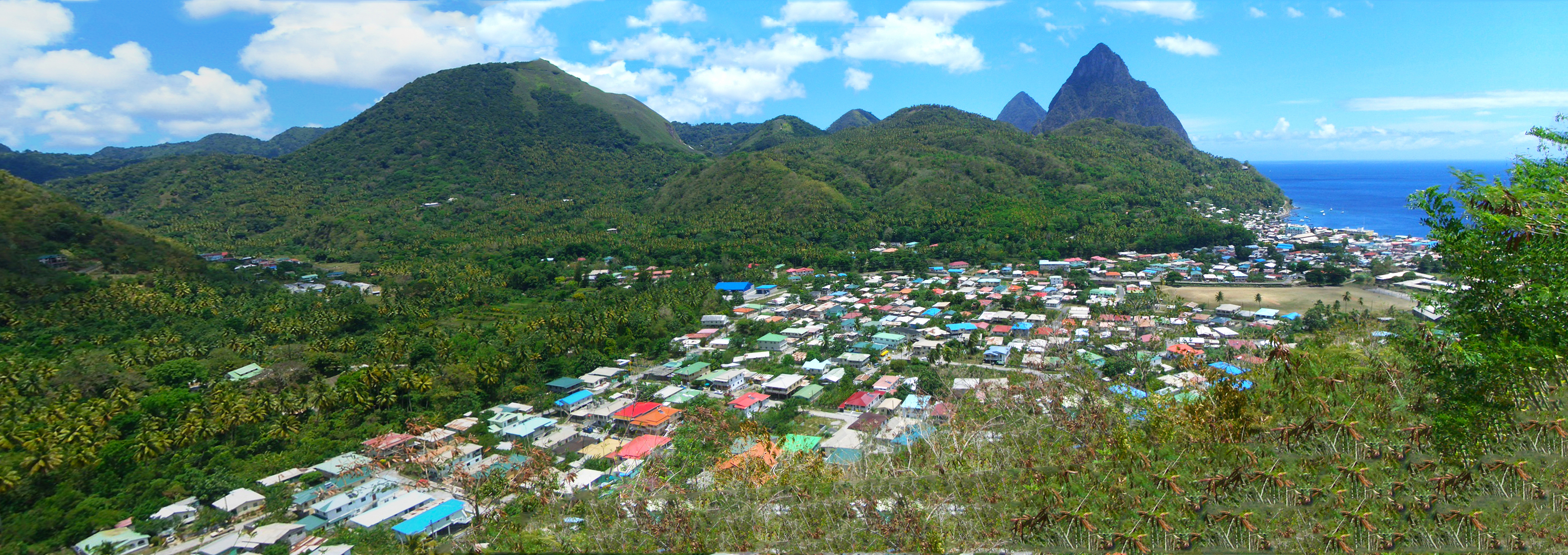
Soufrière

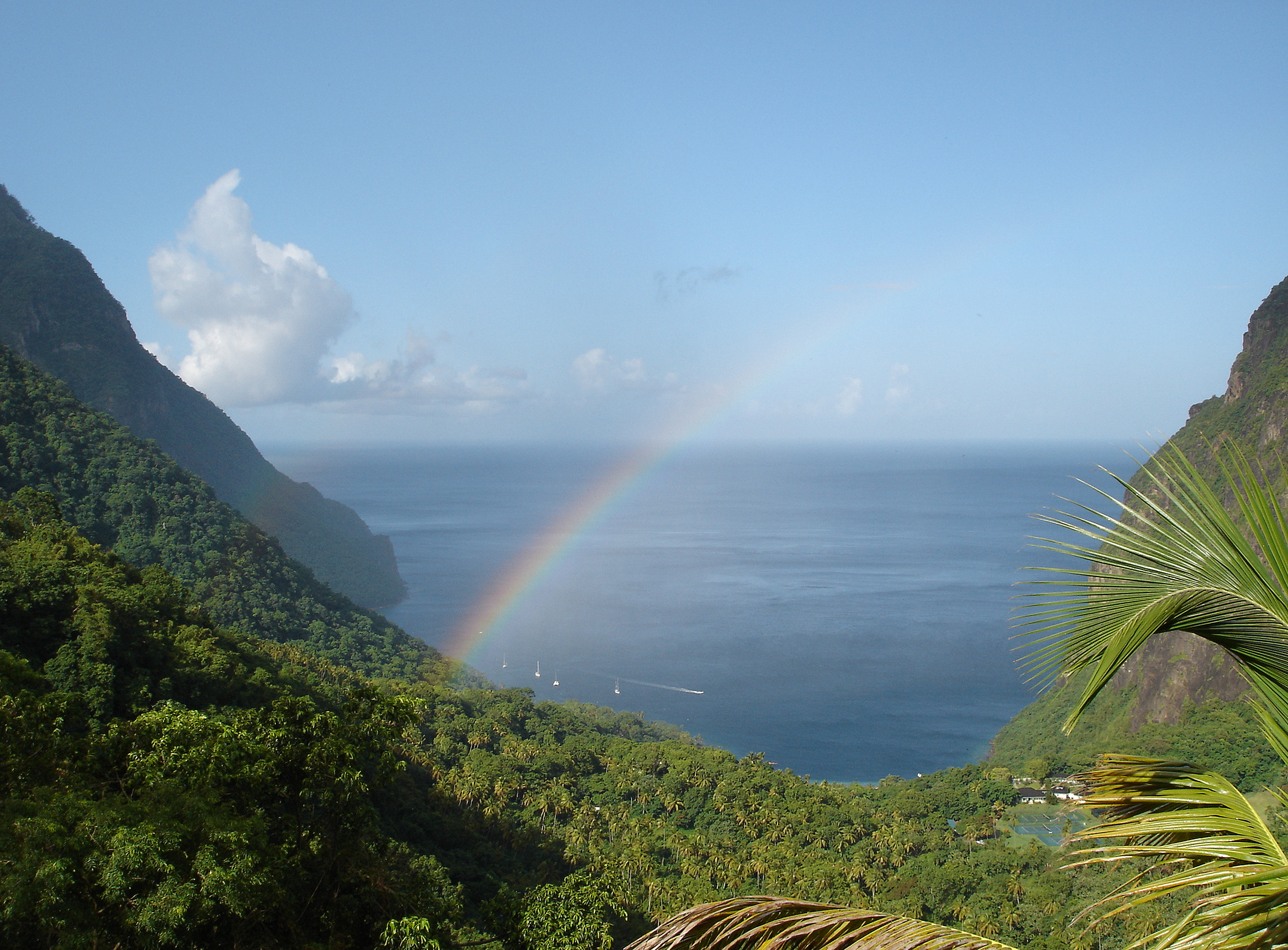
Piton Valley, part of the UNESCO World Heritage Site near Soufrière

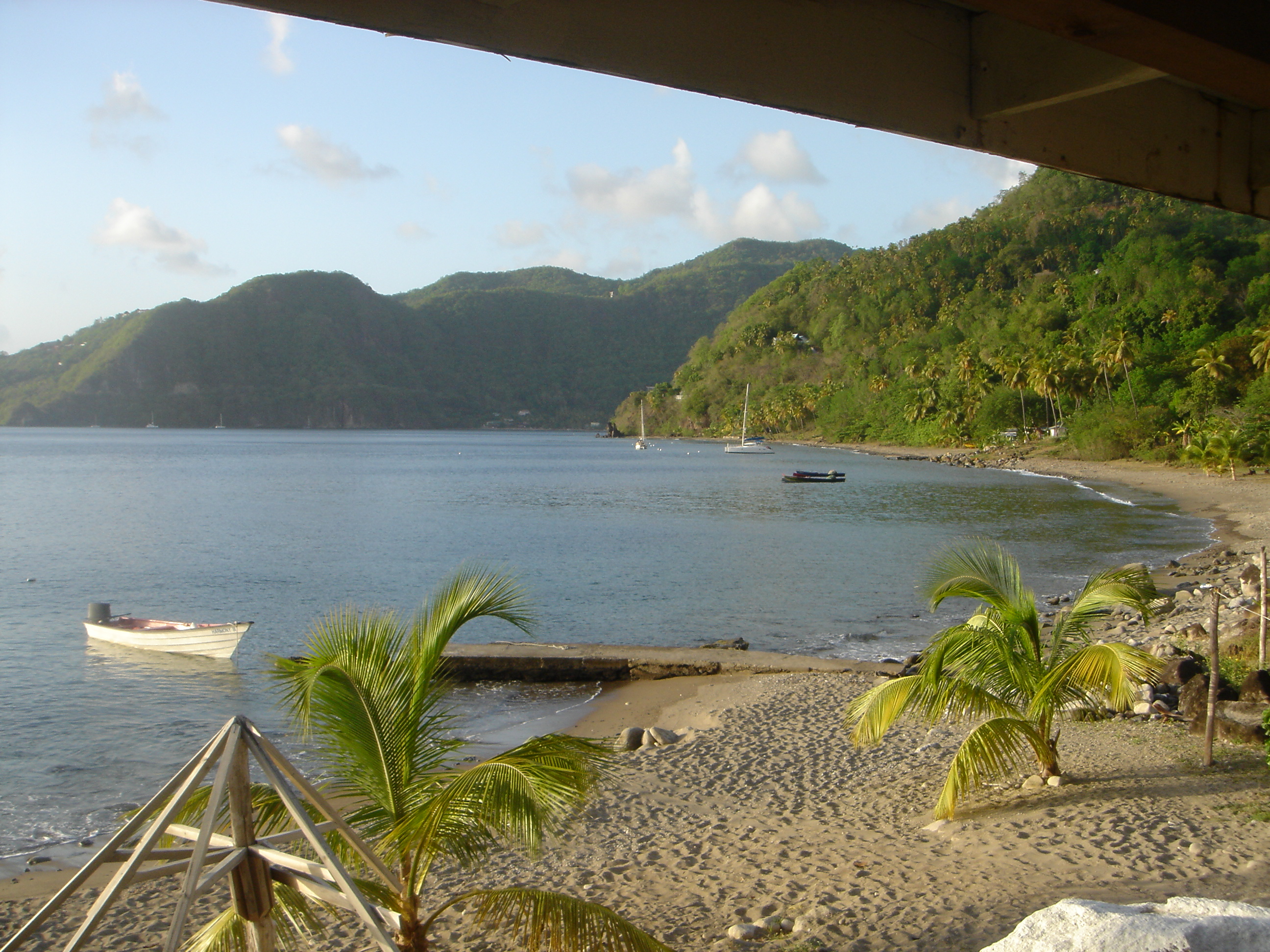
Malgretoute Beach, looking north towards Soufrière

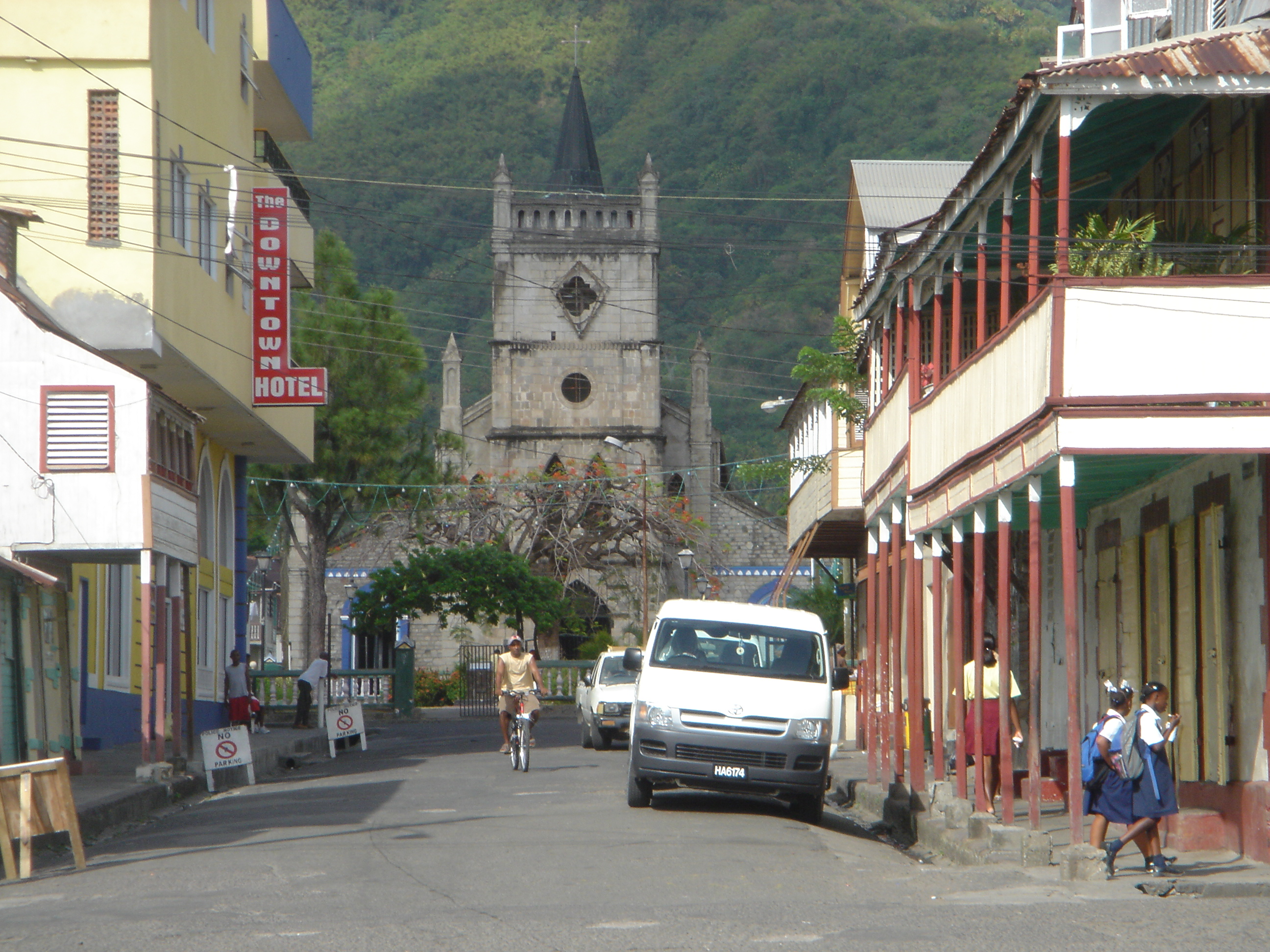
Catholic Church and Central square, Soufrière, April 2007

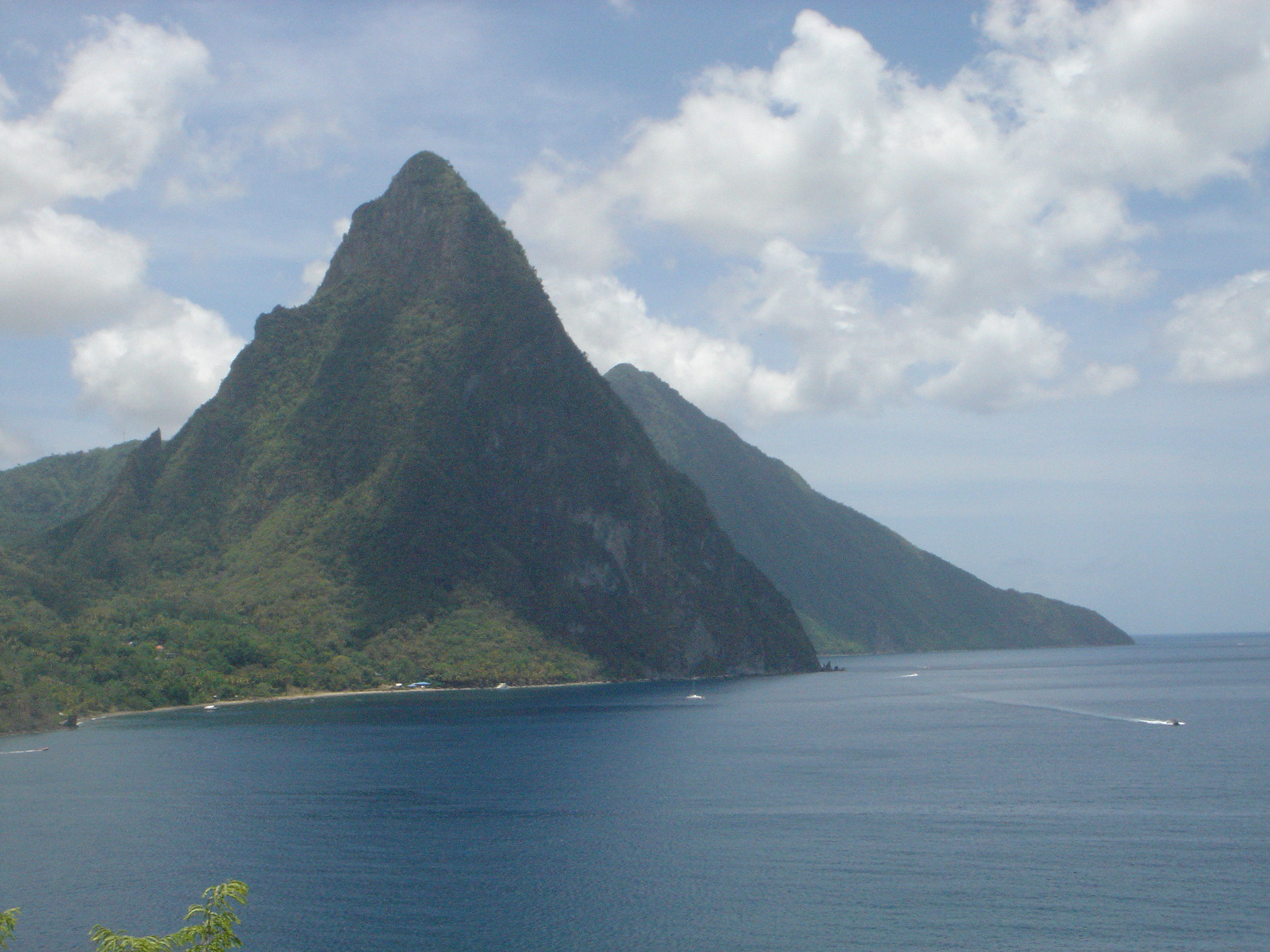
The Pitons at Soufrière

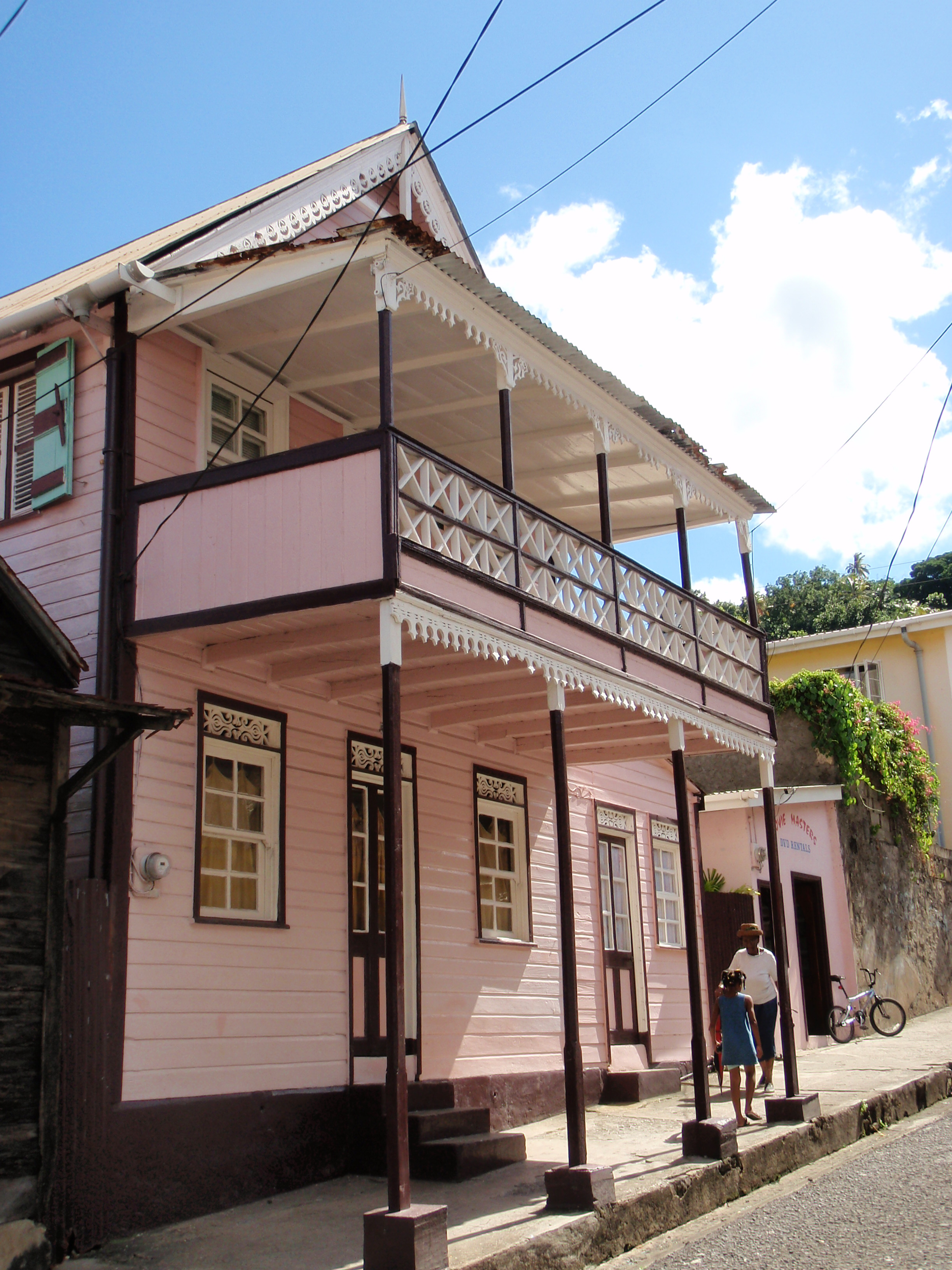
Soufriere

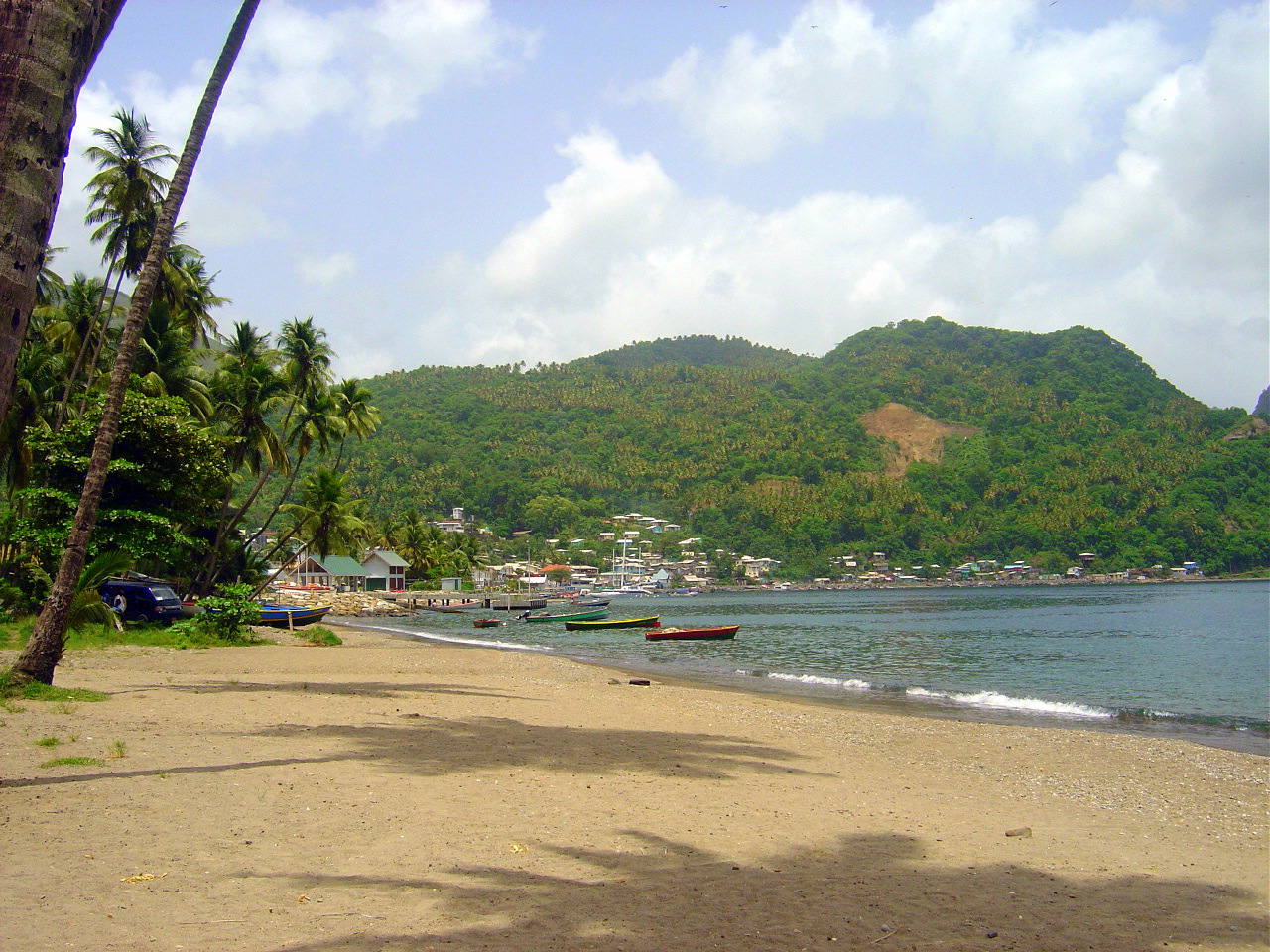
Soufrière Bay

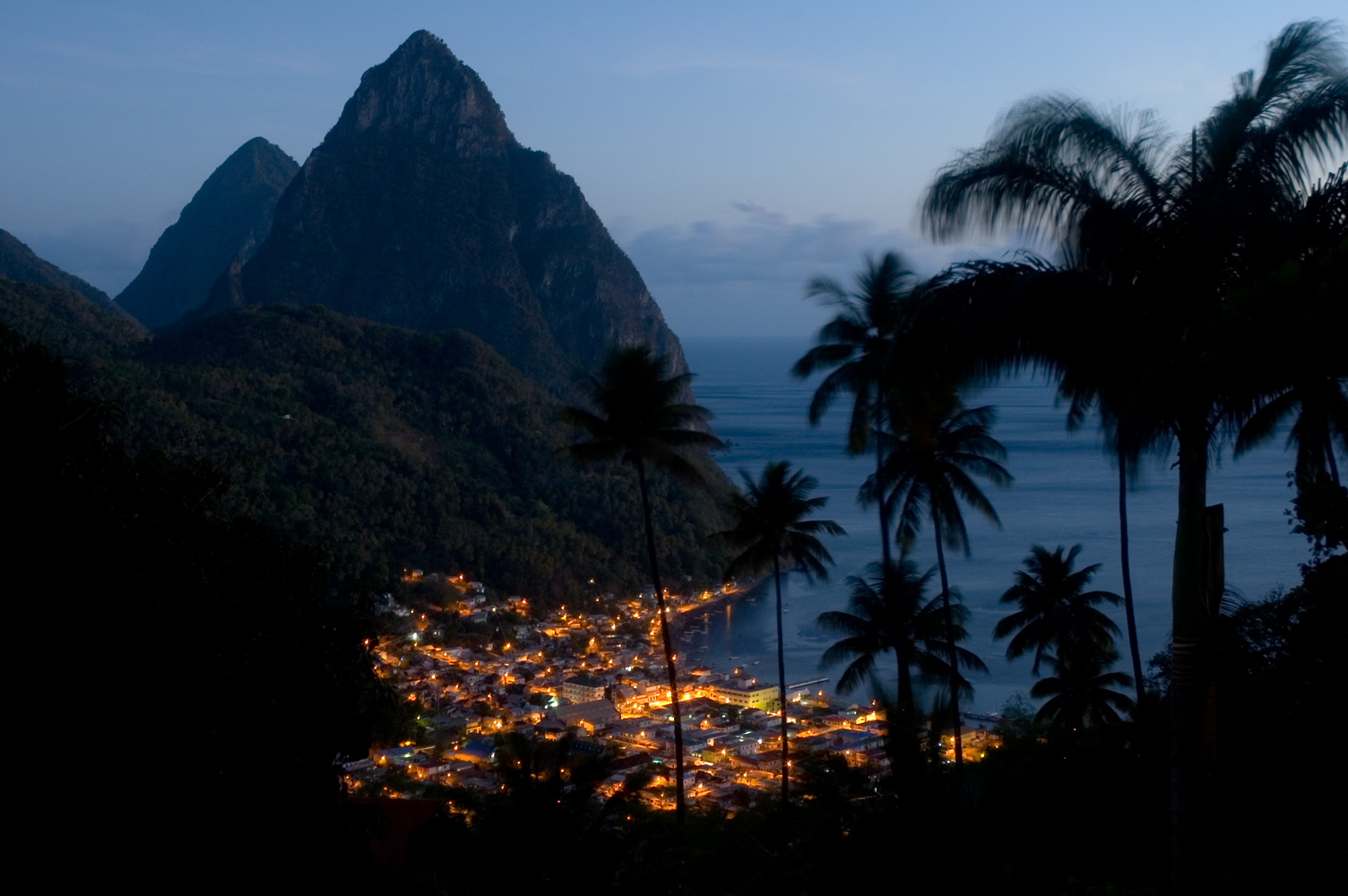
Soufrière at night

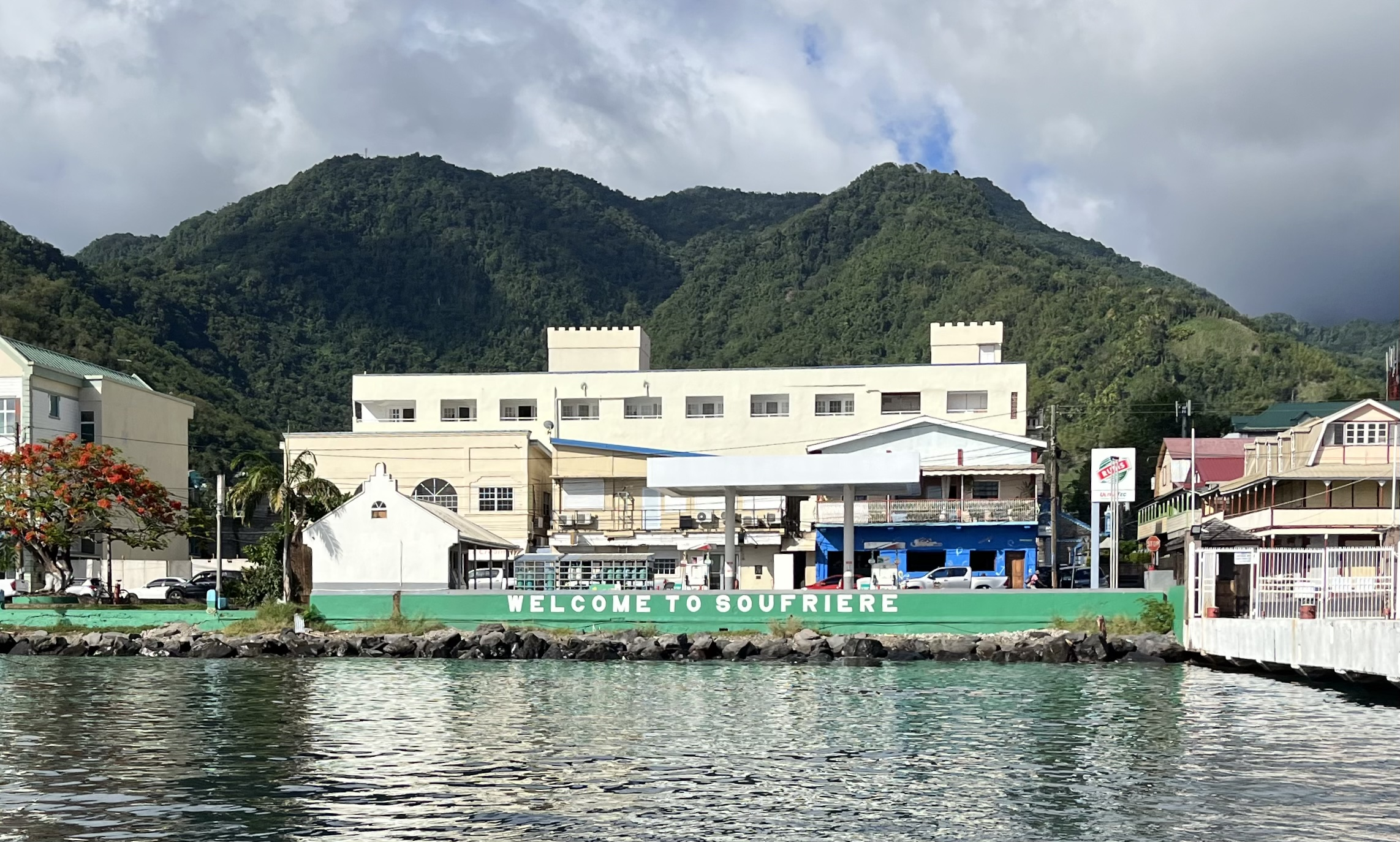
Welcome sign to Soufrière

== Notable people ==
- Emma Hippolyte, politician and government minister
- Yasmin K. (born 1986), pop singer

== See also ==
- Caribbean
- Soufrière River
