= 2018 Special Honours =

British government recognitions

As part of the British honours system, Special Honours are issued at the Monarch's pleasure at any given time. The Special Honours refer to the awards made within royal prerogative, operational honours and other honours awarded outside the New Year Honours and Birthday Honours.

== Hereditary Peerage ==
- His Royal Highness Prince Henry Charles Albert David of Wales, KCVO to be Duke of Sussex, Earl of Dumbarton and Baron Kilkeel – 19 May 2018

== Life Peerages ==
=== Conservative Party ===
- Diana Barran, MBE, to be Baroness Barran, of Bathwick in the City of Bath – 21 June 2018
- The Rt Hon. Sir Edward Garnier, QC, to be Baron Garnier, of Harborough in the County of Leicestershire – 22 June 2018
- The Rt Hon. Sir Alan Haselhurst, to be Baron Haselhurst, of Saffron Walden in the County of Essex – 22 June 2018
- The Rt Hon. Peter Lilley, to be Baron Lilley, of Offa in the County of Hertfordshire – 19 June 2018
- Catherine Meyer (Lady Meyer), CBE to be Baroness Meyer, of Nine Elms in the London Borough of Wandsworth – 19 June 2018
- The Rt Hon. Sir Eric Pickles, to be Baron Pickles, of Brentwood and Ongar in the County of Essex – 19 June 2018
- The Rt Hon. Sir John Randall, to be Baron Randall of Uxbridge, of Uxbridge in the London Borough of Hillingdon – 25 June 2018
- Amanda Sater, to be Baroness Sater, of Kensington in the Royal Borough of Kensington and Chelsea – 21 June 2018

=== Labour Party ===
- Martha Osamor, to be Baroness Osamor, of Tottenham in the London Borough of Haringey and of Asaba in the Republic of Nigeria – 25 November 2018
- Pauline Bryan, to be Baroness Bryan of Partick, of Partick in the City of Glasgow – 21 June 2018
- Iain McNicol, to be Baron McNicol of West Kilbride, of West Kilbride in the County of Ayrshire – 21 June 2018

=== Democratic Unionist Party ===
- The Rev. Dr. William McCrea, to be Baron McCrea of Magherafelt and Cookstown, of Magherafelt in the County of Londonderry and of Cookstown in the County of Tyrone – 19 June 2018

=== Non-affiliated ===
- The Rt Hon. Andrew Tyrie, to be Baron Tyrie, of Chichester in the County of West Sussex – 13 June 2018

=== Crossbench ===
- Sir David Anderson, KBE, QC, to be Baron Anderson of Ipswich, of Ipswich in the County of Suffolk – 10 July 2018
- Rosie Boycott, to be Baroness Boycott, of Whitefield in the County of Somerset – 9 July 2018
- Deborah Bull, CBE, to be Baroness Bull, of Aldwych in the City of Westminster – 11 July 2018
- Sir Jeremy Heywood, KCB, CVO, to be Baron Heywood of Whitehall, of Glossop in the County of Derbyshire – 26 October 2018

== Lord Lieutenant ==
- Dr. Sarah Furness – to be Lord-Lieutenant of the County of Rutland. – 14 February 2018
- Arvind Michael Kapur, OBE – to be Lord-Lieutenant of the County of Leicestershire. – 11 May 2018
- Alison Millar – to be Lord-Lieutenant of the County of Londonderry. – 17 May 2018
- Tia C Jones – to be Lord-Lieutenant of Powys. – 17 July 2018
- Susan Sheldon – to be Lord-Lieutenant of the Isle of Wight. – 26 October 2018
- Edward William Gillespie, OBE – to be Lord-Lieutenant of and in the County of Gloucestershire. – 30 October 2018
- Elizabeth Patricia Gilroy – to be Lord-Lieutenant of the Stewartry of Kirkcudbright. – 5 November 2018
- Johanna Ropner – to be Lord-Lieutenant of the County of North Yorkshire. – 6 November 2018
- Anna Turner – to be Lord-Lieutenant of Shropshire. – 13 November 2018

== Privy Counsellor ==
- The Hon. Sir Seamus Treacy, QC – 12 January 2018
- The Rt Rev. Dame Sarah Mullally, DBE – 14 March 2018
- The Hon. Enele Sopoaga, MP – 14 March 2018
- The Hon. Sir Peter Coulson, QC – 26 April 2018
- Robert Goodwill, MP – 26 April 2018
- The Hon. Sir George Leggatt, QC – 26 April 2018
- Kevan Jones, MP – 26 April 2018
- The Rt Hon. The Baroness Chakrabarti, CBE – 18 May 2018
- Geoffrey Cox, QC, MP – 11 July 2018
- Dominic Raab, MP – 11 July 2018
- The Hon. Sir Jonathan Baker, QC – 7 November 2018
- The Hon. Dame Nicola Davies, DBE, QC – 7 November 2018
- The Hon. Sir Nicholas Green, QC – 7 November 2018
- The Hon. Sir Charles Haddon-Cave, QC – 7 November 2018
- Steve Barclay, MP – 20 November 2018
- Mark Tami, MP – 23 November 2018
- Christopher Pincher, MP – 23 November 2018
- Sir Edward Leigh, MP – 28 December 2018
- Philip Dunne, MP – 28 December 2018
- Sir Roger Gale, MP – 28 December 2018

== Most Noble Order of the Garter ==
Order of the Garter ribbon

=== Knight Companion of the Order of the Garter (KG) ===
- The Rt Hon. The Viscount Brookeborough – 23 April 2018

=== Lady Companion of the Order of the Garter (LG) ===
- Dame Mary Fagan, DCVO – 23 April 2018

=== Stranger Knight Companion of the Order of the Garter (KG) ===
- His Majesty The King of the Netherlands – 23 October 2018

== Knight Bachelor ==
Knight's Bachelor ribbon

- The Hon. Mr Justice Timothy Miles Fancourt, QC – 8 February 2018
- The Rt Hon. David Evennett, MP – 18 May 2018
- The Rt Hon. John Hayes, CBE, MP – 23 November 2018

== Most Honourable Order of the Bath ==
Ribbon bar of the Order of the Bath

=== Knight Grand Cross of the Order of the Bath (GCB) ===
- The Rt Hon. The Lord Heywood of Whitehall, KCB, CVO – 31 October 2018

== Most Distinguished Order of St Michael and St George ==
Order of St Michael and St George ribbon

=== Knight / Dame Grand Cross of the Order of St Michael and St George (GCMG) ===
- Her Excellency The Hon. Sandra Mason, DA, QC – Governor-General of Barbados – 8 January 2018
- His Excellency The Hon. Neville Cenac – Governor-General of Saint Lucia – 18 January 2018

=== Knight Commander of the Order of St Michael and St George (KCMG) ===
Honorary

- Dr. George Vella, Maltese national – Former Minister of Foreign Affairs, Republic of Malta – For services to UK-Malta relations and the Commonwealth.

=== Companion of the Order of St Michael and St George (CMG) ===
Honorary

- Dr. Stefan Nicolaas Dercon, Belgian national – Chief Economist, Department for International Development – For services to economics and international development.

== Royal Victorian Order ==
Royal Victorian Order ribbon

Royal Victorian Order (Honorary appointment) ribbon

=== Knight Grand Cross of the Royal Victorian Order (GCVO) ===
- Lieutenant-Colonel Sir Andrew Ford, KCVO – upon relinquishing his appointment as Comptroller, Lord Chamberlain's Office – 11 December 2018
- The Rt. Hon. The Lord Vestey, KCVO, GCStJ, DL – upon relinquishing his appointment as Master of the Horse – 12 December 2018

=== Knight Commander of the Royal Victorian Order (KCVO) ===
- Captain Nicholas Peter Wright, CVO, RN – upon relinquishing his appointment as Private Secretary to The Princess Royal – 11 December 2018

=== Commander of the Royal Victorian Order (CVO) ===
- Dr. Jonathan James Cornelius Holliday, LVO – on the relinquishment of his appointment as Apothecary to the Queen at Windsor– 14 December 2018

=== Lieutenant of the Royal Victorian Order (LVO) ===
- Christopher Robin Weatherley – on his retirement as Fire Safety and Access Manager, London Palaces.
- Edward Sackville Lane Fox – on the relinquishment of his role as Private Secretary to The Duke and Duchess of Sussex.
- David Frank Westwood, MVO, RVM – on his retirement as Exhibitions and Maintenance Conservator, Royal Collection Trust
- Oliver Henry Urquhart Irvine – on the relinquishment of his appointment as Assistant Keeper of the Royal Archives – 14 December 2018
- Sally Osman – upon relinquishing her appointment as Director of Royal Communication – 18 December 2018

=== Member of the Royal Victorian Order (MVO) ===
- Keith Sanderson – on his retirement as Head Chauffeur, Royal Household
- Captain (QGO) Surendrakumar Gurung, The Queen's Gurkha Signals
- Captain (QGO) Dillikumar Rai, The Royal Gurkha Rifles

== Most Excellent Order of the British Empire ==
Ribbon bar of the Order of the British Empire (Military)

Ribbon bar of the Order of the British Empire (Civil)

=== Knight / Dame Commander of the Order of the British Empire (KBE / DBE) ===
- The Hon. Mrs Justice Sara Elizabeth Cockerill, QC – 12 January 2018
- The Hon. Mrs Justice Christina Caroline Lambert, QC – 8 February 2018

Honorary

- Prof. Vitit Muntarbhorn, Thai national – United Nations expert in human rights; Professor of Law, Chulalongkorn University, Bangkok – For services to International Human Rights.

=== Commander of the Order of the British Empire (CBE) ===
Military division

- Commodore William Jonathan Warrender, RN – 11 May 2018
- Air Vice-Marshal John Jackson Stringer, Royal Air Force – 11 May 2018
- Brigadier Nicholas Stephen Pond, MBE – 23 November 2018

=== Officer of the Order of the British Empire (OBE) ===
Military division

- Lieutenant Colonel Jason Ainley, Corps of Royal Engineers – 11 May 2018
- Wing Commander Kathryn Elizabeth Ferris, Royal Air Force – 11 May 2018
- Wing Commander Mark David Lorriman-Hughes, Royal Air Force – 11 May 2018
- Wing Commander Matthew James Peterson, Royal Air Force – 11 May 2018
- Colonel John Wakelin – 23 November 2018

Honorary

- Hofesh Shechter, German/Israeli national – For services to contemporary dance.
- Professor Teo Soo-Hwang, Malaysian national – For developing research collaborations on Asian cancer between Malaysia and Britain.

=== Member of the Order of the British Empire (MBE) ===
Military division

- Captain Patrick Halford, Royal Marines – 11 May 2018
- Colour Sergeant Mark Roughsedge, Royal Marines – 11 May 2018
- Major James David Brown, Grenadier Guards – 11 May 2018
- Squadron Leader Craig Robert Ledieu, Royal Air Force – 11 May 2018
- Squadron Leader Cristopher Andrew Right, Royal Air Force – 23 November 2018
- Acting Major Jon Sydarby Heathcliff Hassain, Corps of Royal Engineers, Army Reserve – 23 November 2018
- Acting Major Timothy James Graham, The Royal Scots Dragoons Guard – 23 November 2018
- Lieutenant Colonel Charles Edward Digby Grist, The Rifles – 23 November 2018
- Major Peter Alexander Houlton-Hart, The Royal Gurkha Rifles – 23 November 2018
- Sergeant Abigail Frances Morrow, Royal Army Physical Training Corps – 23 November 2018
- Squadron Leader Christopher Andrew Wright, Royal Air Force – 23 November 2018

Honorary

- Frank Havrah Fassett, US national – For services to the crafts of knitting and needlework.
- Natascha Biebow, German national – For services to children's writers and illustrators.
- Claudia Mariel Papa Fragomen, Argentinian national – For services to the British community and the British Embassy in Argentina.
- Bryan David Lewis, Irish national – For services to education and charity.

== British Empire Medal (BEM) ==
Ribbon bar of the British Empire Medal (Civil)

Honorary

- Judith Houlahan, Irish national – For services to the health and welfare of older people in Northern Ireland.
- Milena Kolarikova Ba, Czech and Dutch national – For services to the commemoration of British soldiers in Belgium.
- Cristina Monteiro, Spanish national – For services to British commercial interests and charitable work in Madrid.
- Ulf Axel Mikael Olin, Finnish national – For services to the British Embassy Helsinki, Finland.
- George Psaradakis, Greek national – For services to the community in London.
- Milagros Villanueva, Filipino national – For services to the British Embassy Brasilia.

== Military Cross (MC) ==
Ribbon bar of the Military Cross

- Corporal Hugo Wilton, Royal Marines – 11 May 2018
- Colour Sergeant Daniel Mark Garratt, Parachute Regiment – 11 May 2018

== Distinguished Flying Cross (DFC) ==
Ribbon bar of the Distinguished Flying Cross

- Flight Lieutenant Thomas Philip Hansford, Royal Air Force – 23 November 2018

== Air Force Cross (AFC) ==
Ribbon bar of the Air Force Cross

- Squadron Leader Ian Samuel Dornan, Royal Air Force – 11 May 2018
- Flight Lieutenant Ben Wallis, Royal Air Force – 11 May 2018

== Queen's Gallantry Medal (QGM) ==
Ribbon bar of the Queen's Gallantry Medal

- Air Engineering Technician (Mechanical) Stuart Maurice Rogers, Royal Navy – 11 May 2018
- Leading Seaman (Diver) Simon Wharton, Royal Navy – 23 November 2018
- Chief Petty Officer (Diver) Kristopher Fenwick, Royal Navy – 23 November 2018

== Royal Victorian Medal (RVM) ==
Royal Victorian Medal ribbon

Gold

- Philip Shaun Croasdale, LVO, RVM – formerly Welfare and Housing Manager, Royal Household.

== Mentioned in Despatches ==
Palm of the Mentioned in Despatches

- Captain Thomas James Limb, Royal Marines – 11 May 2018
- Acting Lance Corporal Robert Patrick Neill, Royal Marines – 11 May 2018
- Lance Corporal Nathan William Fletcher, The Parachute Regiment – 11 May 2018
- Sergeant Andrew Mather, The Royal Irish Regiment – 11 May 2018
- Lance Corporal Charles Anthony Dexter Taylor, The Parachute Regiment – 11 May 2018
- Squadron Leader Matthew Frederick Axcell, Royal Air Force – 11 May 2018
- Flight Lieutenant Helena Bullivant, Royal Air Force – 11 May 2018

== Queen's Commendation for Bravery ==
- Sergeant Christopher Samuel, Royal Marines – 11 May 2018
- Sergeant Alistair James Seddon, Royal Marines – 11 May 2018
- Petty Officer (Diver) Toby Stuart Jones, Royal Navy – 11 May 2018
- Acting Flight Sergeant Benjamin Martin Howarth, Royal Air Force – 11 May 2018
- Leading Seaman (Diver) Matthew John O’Brien, Royal Navy – 23 November 2018
- Able Seaman (Diver) Joshua Thomas Smith, Royal Navy – 23 November 2018

== Queen's Commendation for Valuable Service ==
Palm of the Queen's Commendation for Valuable Service

- Colour Sergeant Omar Acid, Royal Marines – 11 May 2018
- Colonel Daniel Blanchford, OBE – 11 May 2018
- Petty Officer Warfare Specialist (Electronic Warfare) James Hick, Royal Navy – 11 May 2018
- Sergeant Paul Richards, Royal Marines – 11 May 2018
- Corporal Aleksandr David Stovell, Royal Marines – 11 May 2018
- Colour Sergeant Michael Waker, Royal Marines – 11 May 2018
- Acting Lieutenant Colonel Philip Matthew Birch, The Royal Anglian Regiment – 11 May 2018
- Major Victoria Anne Bullied, Queen Alexandra's Royal Army Nursing Corps – 11 May 2018
- Major Noel Clark Claydon-Swales, The Light Dragoons – 11 May 2018
- Major Fiona Allison Dangerfield, The Royal Logistic Corps – 11 May 2018
- Colonel Andrew Bernard Jackson – 11 May 2018
- Warrant Officer Class 2 Peter Keogh, MC, The Royal Irish Regiment – 11 May 2018
- Major Clodia Nicolette O'Neill, Corps of Royal Engineers – 11 May 2018
- Acting Sergeant Thomas Andrew Stokes, Intelligence Corps – 11 May 2018
- Lance Corporal Liam Derek Stott, Royal Army Medical Corps – 11 May 2018
- Warrant Officer Class 2 Luke Townsin, Corps of Royal Engineers – 11 May 2018
- Staff Sergeant Mark Robert Brodrick, Royal Air Force – 11 May 2018
- Flight Lieutenant Gregory Stuart Mould, Royal Air Force – 11 May 2018
- Mrs Lisa Gardner, Civil Servant – 11 May 2018
- Flight Lieutenant Alexander Eeveson, Royal Air Force – 23 November 2018
- Wing Commander Cristopher James Hoyle, Royal Air Force – 23 November 2018
- Acting Flight Lieutenant Laura McDonald, Royal Air Force – 23 November 2018
- Squadron Leader Edward Alexandar Sellers, Royal Air Force – 23 November 2018
- Major Thomas Charles Lilleyman, Corps of Royal Engineers – 23 November 2018
- Sergeant William Nicholas MacFarlane, Royal Marines – 23 November 2018
- Sergeant James Oldale, Royal Marines – 23 November 2018
- Lieutenant Amy Gilmore, Royal Navy – 23 November 2018
- Major Thomas James Quin, Royal Marines – 23 November 2018
- Staff Sergeant Bradley Ross Carter, Corps of Royal Engineers, Army Reserve – 23 November 2018
- Captain Sam Patterson, The Royal Logistic Corps – 23 November 2018
- Captain Robert Matthew George Price, The Rifles – 23 November 2018
- Captain Lucy Rose Stearn, Intelligence Corps – 23 November 2018
- Acting Corporal Joseph Steer, Intelligence Corps – 23 November 2018
- Lieutenant Colonel Benjamin Mark Wilde, The Mercian Regiment – 23 November 2018
- Flight Sergeant Benjamin David Crossley, Royal Air Force – 23 November 2018
- Flight Lieutenant Alexander Eveson, Royal Air Force – 23 November 2018

== Order of St John ==
Order of St John ribbon

=== Knight of the Order of St John ===
- Dr. Maged Abu Ramadan
- Alderman Charles Edward Beck Bowman
- The Very Rev. John Cairns, KCVO
- Dr. John Ferguson-Smith
- Vice Admiral Sir Paul Lambert, KCB
- Joseph Mackie
- Stephen James Brindley Highes
- The Most Rev. Dr. Thabo Cecil Makgoba
- Graham James Gillespie
- His Excellency Sir Frank Kabui, GCMG, CSI, OBE
- Alderman Peter Estlin
- James Alexander Bingham
- Dr. Sarath Malcolm Samarage

=== Dame of the Order of St John ===
- Christine Ruby Benson
- Her Excellency Dame Sandra Mason, GCMG, QC

=== Commander of the Order of St John ===
- Clive Nicholas BOOTHMAN
- Martin Peter CALLAGHAN
- Dr Malcolm Robert GOLIN
- George Findlay MACRAE
- Geoffrey John STREETER
- Alexander Edwards URQUHART
- Sheila Ann, Mrs FERGUSON-SMITH
- Elizabeth Stewart, Mrs HAMILTON

=== Officer of the Order of St John ===
- David John AMOS
- Lieutenant Colonel Giles De MARGARY TD
- Paul Leonard FRENCH
- William Alfred Anthony HACKETT
- Angus John LOUDON MBE
- Ewen Alexander MACDONALD
- Dennis William MARSHALL
- Paul MEALOR
- Geoffrey Ian NICHOLLS
- Andrew Ian SMITH
- Malcolm SLATER
- George Alexander WAY
- Miss Lynn Elaine CLEAL
- Solange Hazel, Mrs CRIPPS
- Sarah, Mrs MORE-MOLYNEUX
- Miss Katherine Mary SMITH

=== Member of the Order of St John ===
- Mark Joseph ADHEN
- Kenneth BLACKMAN
- William Stephen CADMAN
- Mark CORETH
- Thomas James DIMMOCK
- Andrew Mark EDWARDS
- David Thomas Sinclair GIBB
- Canon Mark Richard GRIFFIN
- Alderman and Sheriff Timothy Russell HAILES JP
- Donald Angus Stuart MacGREGGOR
- Steven John MITCHELL
- Steven John MULLOY
- Major Dennis Reginald OUTRAM
- Reverend Mark PERRY
- Major Christopher John PICKIN
- Kenneth PRITCHARD
- Sheriff Neil Graham Morgan REDCLIFFE
- David Michael Andrew REES
- Squadron Leader Alistair Keith RIDLAND
- Neil ROLLAND
- Anthony Michael SMITH
- Lieutenant Commander Rex THORNBOROUGH RD* RNR
- Lesley, Mrs BODKIN
- Alison, Mrs CHALMERS
- Sharon Michelle, Mrs CHAMBERS
- Miss Patricia Mary COUGHLAN
- Miss Jennifer DUKE
- Jess Lawson Love, Mrs DUNCAN
- Miss Lynne EDWARDS
- Marita Faye, Mrs EDWARDS
- Nicola Yvette, Mrs GEORGE
- Victoria Ann, Mrs HARRISON
- Deborah Jane, Mrs HAVILL
- Dawn Maria, Mrs MACKINNON
- Wendy, Mrs McEVOY
- Jacqueline Susan, Mrs PHILLIPS-CLARKE
- Miss Sarah Philippa Smith SCOTT
- Erica Ann, Miss SEGGIE
- Miss Gillian Sarah TANNER
- Janice, Mrs WEBSTER
- Miss Eve WRIGHT
