= Colombia–Saint Lucia relations =

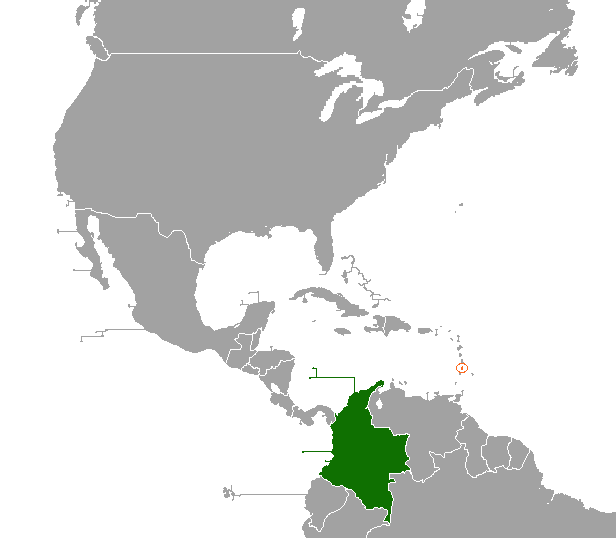

- Colombia: Saint Lucia

Colombia–Saint Lucia relations are the bilateral relations between Colombia and Saint Lucia. Both nations have maintained a friendly relationship since the 20th century. The two countries are members of the Association of Caribbean States, Community of Latin American and Caribbean States, Organization of American States and the United Nations.

== History ==
Colombia and Saint Lucia established diplomatic relations on March 18, 1982. On May 13, 2008, during a presentation, former governor-general Pearlette Louisy had interests on the Technical and Scientific Cooperation Agreement between St. Lucia and the Republic of Colombia. In August 2013, Colombia and Saint Lucia interchanged experiences on the disaster risk management, which is under Colombia's Cooperation Strategy with the Caribbean Basin. In May 2018, Colombian ambassador Roberto Garcia Marquez, presented his credentials to the Government House order to promote cooperation between Colombia and Saint Lucia. The former governor-general Neville Cenac affirmed the country's support to Colombia and expressed hope for peace after a peace agreement was signed.

== Bilateral agreements ==
Both nations signed the Agreement on Technical and Scientific Cooperation between the Republic of Colombia and Saint Lucia (1981).

== Trade ==
In 2022, Colombia exported $2.52M to Saint Lucia. The products exported from Colombia to Saint Lucia included raw sugar ($728k), unglazed ceramics ($237k), and baked goods ($227k). Saint Lucia exported $28.2k to Colombia, but no products were exported.

== Diplomatic missions ==
- Colombia uses its embassy in Kingston as a concurrent embassy in Saint Lucia.

== See also ==
- Foreign relations of Colombia
- Foreign relations of Saint Lucia
