= Monarchy of Saint Lucia =

King of Saint Lucia
- Coat of arms of Saint Lucia

Incumbent
- Charles III since 8 September 2022

Details
- Style: His Majesty
- Heir apparent: William, Prince of Wales
- First monarch: Elizabeth II
- Formed: 22 February 1979

The monarchy of Saint Lucia is a system of government in which a hereditary monarch is the sovereign and head of state of Saint Lucia. The current monarch and head of state, since 8 September 2022, is King Charles III. As sovereign, he is the personal embodiment of the Saint Lucian Crown. Although the person of the sovereign is equally shared with 14 other independent countries within the Commonwealth of Nations, each country's monarchy is separate and legally distinct. As a result, the current monarch is officially titled King of Saint Lucia and, in this capacity, he and other members of the Royal Family undertake public and private functions domestically and abroad as representatives of the Saint Lucian state. However, the King is the only member of the royal family with any constitutional role.

All executive authority is vested in the monarch, and royal assent is required for the Parliament of Saint Lucia to enact laws and for letters patent and Orders in Council to have legal effect. Most of the powers are exercised by the elected members of parliament, the ministers of the Crown generally drawn from amongst them, and the judges and justices of the peace. Other powers vested in the monarch, such as dismissal of a prime minister, are significant but are treated only as reserve powers and as an important security part of the role of the monarchy.

The Crown today primarily functions as a guarantor of continuous and stable governance and a nonpartisan safeguard against the abuse of power. While some powers are exercisable only by the sovereign, most of the monarch's operational and ceremonial duties are exercised by his representative, the governor-general of Saint Lucia.

== Origins ==
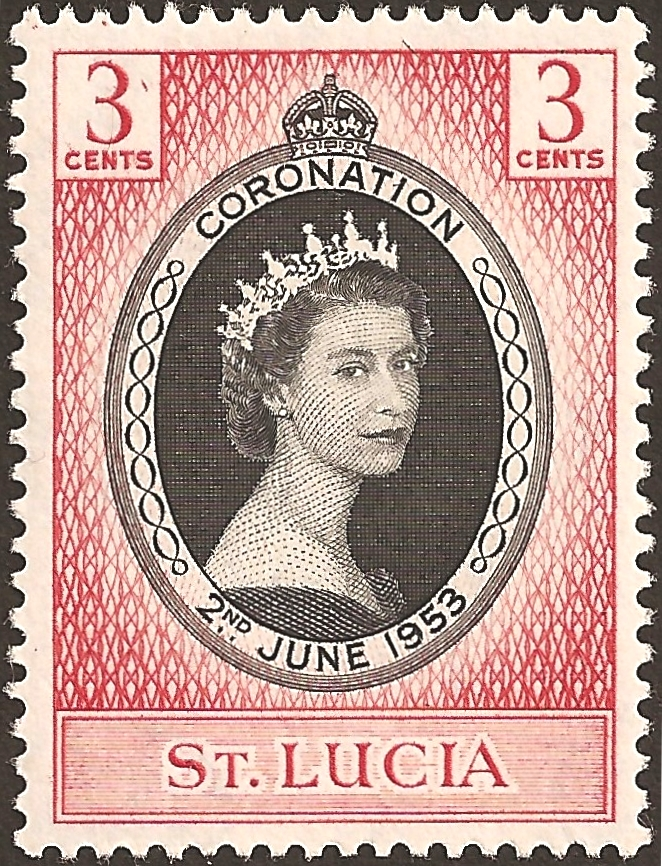
Coronation stamp, 1953

The French were the first Europeans to settle on the island. They signed a treaty with the native Island Caribs in 1660. England took control of the island from 1663 to 1667. In ensuing years, it was at war with France fourteen times, and the rule of the island changed frequently. Saint Lucia was finally ceded to Britain in 1814 by the Treaty of Paris, after which it became a crown colony. During 1838–85, together with the other islands of the Windward group, it was administered by the governor of Barbados. Representative government was obtained by the constitution of 1924.

After attempting a federation with other West Indian colonies in 1958, Saint Lucia continued as a self-governing colony and later assumed a status of association with the United Kingdom on 1 March 1967. Saint Lucia achieved full independence on 22 February 1979, as an independent realm within the Commonwealth, with Queen Elizabeth II as the head of state and Queen of Saint Lucia.

Saint Lucia continues to cherish and benefit from its long standing relationship with the monarchy which has taken this island from colonialism through Associated Statehood and now Independence.

— Prime Minister Allen Chastanet, 2019

Princess Alexandra represented the Queen at the independence celebrations in 1979. She opened the first session of the new parliament on 22 February, on behalf of the Queen.

== The Saint Lucian Crown and its aspects ==
I know that she regards her role as your head of state and your Queen as being an enormous privilege as you have developed as a nation the fact that you wanted to remain as a realm and wanted the Queen to remain as your Queen, is something that has always meant a great deal to her and she has always taken a particular interest in all of her realms and she follows your fortunes here in Saint Lucia with great interest.

— Prince Edward, Earl of Wessex, 2012

Saint Lucia is one of fifteen independent nations, known as Commonwealth realms, which shares its sovereign with other monarchies in the Commonwealth of Nations, with the monarch's relationship with Saint Lucia completely independent from his position as monarch of any other realm. Despite sharing the same person as their respective monarch, each of the Commonwealth realms — including Saint Lucia — is sovereign and independent of the others. The monarch is represented by a viceroy—the governor-general of Saint Lucia—in the country.

Since the independence of Saint Lucia in 1979, the pan-national Crown has had both a shared and a separate character and the sovereign's role as monarch of Saint Lucia is distinct to his or her position as monarch of any other realm, including the United Kingdom. The monarchy thus ceased to be an exclusively British institution and in Saint Lucia became a Saint Lucian, or "domesticated" establishment.

This division is illustrated in a number of ways: The sovereign, for example, holds a unique Saint Lucian title and, when he is acting in public specifically as a representative of Saint Lucia, he uses, where possible, symbols of Saint Lucia, including the country's national flag, unique royal symbols, and the like. Also, only Saint Lucia government ministers can advise the sovereign on matters of the country.

In Saint Lucia, the legal personality of the state is referred to as "The Crown in right of Saint Lucia".

=== Title ===
In Saint Lucia, the monarch's official title is: Charles the Third, by the Grace of God, King of Saint Lucia and of His other Realms and Territories, Head of the Commonwealth.

This style communicates Saint Lucia's status as an independent monarchy, highlighting the monarch's role specifically as sovereign of Saint Lucia, as well as the shared aspect of the Crown throughout the realms. Typically, the sovereign is styled "King of Saint Lucia", and is addressed as such when in Saint Lucia, or performing duties on behalf of Saint Lucia abroad.

=== Succession ===
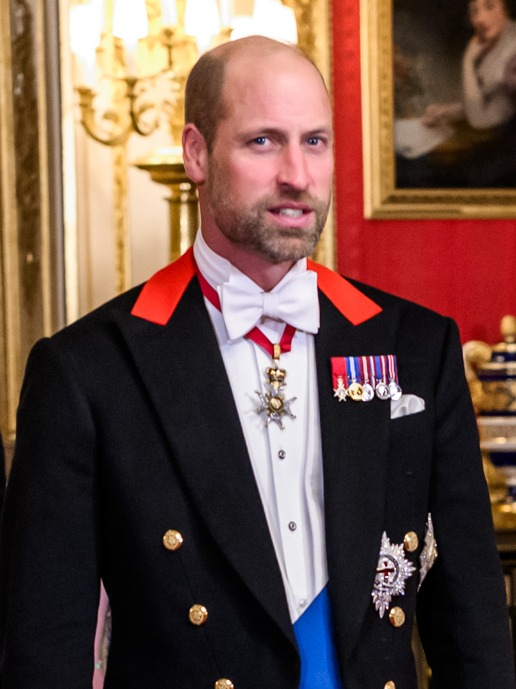
William, Prince of Wales, is the current heir apparent to the Saint Lucian throne

Like some realms, Saint Lucia defers to United Kingdom law to determine the line of succession.

Succession is by absolute primogeniture governed by the provisions of the Succession to the Crown Act 2013, as well as the Act of Settlement, 1701, and the Bill of Rights, 1689. This legislation limits the succession to the natural (i.e. non-adopted), legitimate descendants of Sophia, Electress of Hanover, and stipulates that the monarch cannot be a Roman Catholic, and must be in communion with the Church of England upon ascending the throne. Though these constitutional laws, as they apply to Saint Lucia, still lie within the control of the British parliament, both the United Kingdom and Saint Lucia cannot change the rules of succession without the unanimous consent of the other realms, unless explicitly leaving the shared monarchy relationship; a situation that applies identically in all the other realms, and which has been likened to a treaty amongst these countries.

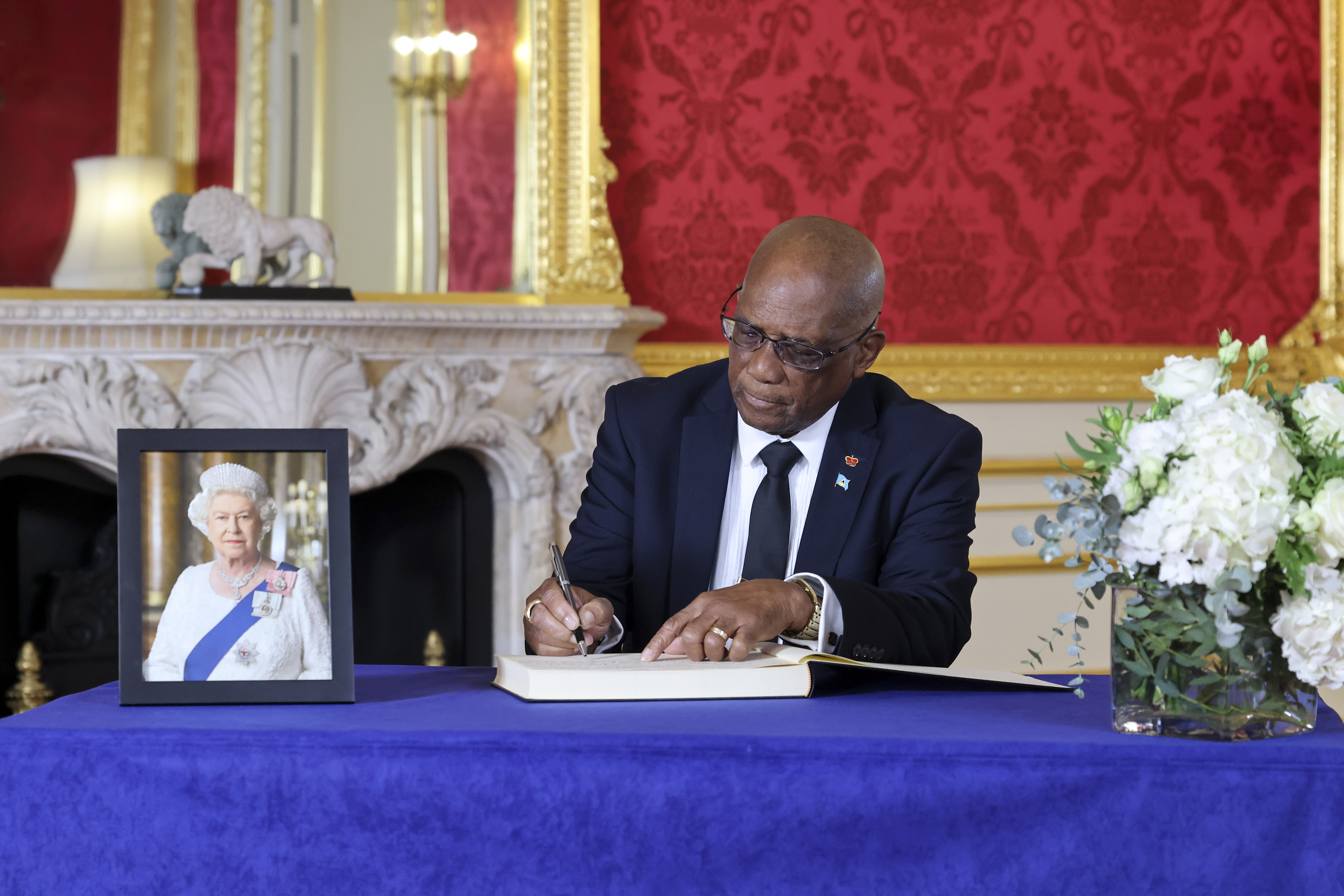
Acting Governor-General Errol Charles signing the book of condolences in memory of Queen Elizabeth II at Lancaster House, 17 September 2022

Upon a demise of the Crown (the death or abdication of a sovereign), it is customary for the accession of the new monarch to be proclaimed by the governor-general in the capital, Castries, after the accession. Regardless of any proclamations, the late sovereign's heir immediately and automatically succeeds, without any need for confirmation or further ceremony. An appropriate period of mourning also follows, during which flags across the country are flown at half-mast to honour the late monarch.

== Constitutional role ==
On my assuming office, I chose as my Mission Statement to truly and faithfully represent the Sovereign in Saint Lucia in accordance with the provisions of the Constitution, to foster national unity and identity at home and abroad, to promote our national economic, cultural and social interests and to encourage excellence in all fields of endeavours.

— Governor-General Dame Pearlette Louisy, 2017

The Constitution of Saint Lucia is made up of a variety of statutes and conventions which gives Saint Lucia a parliamentary system of government under a constitutional monarchy, wherein the role of the monarch and governor-general is both legal and practical, but not political. The Crown is regarded as a corporation, in which several parts share the authority of the whole, with the sovereign as the person at the centre of the constitutional construct, meaning all powers of state are constitutionally reposed in the monarch. The government of Saint Lucia is also thus formally referred to as His Majesty's Government of Saint Lucia.

Most of the monarch's domestic duties are performed by the governor-general, appointed by the monarch on the advice of the Prime Minister of Saint Lucia.

All institutions of government act under the sovereign's authority; the vast powers that belong to the Saint Lucian Crown are collectively known as the Royal Prerogative. Parliamentary approval is not required for the exercise of the Royal Prerogative; moreover, the consent of the Crown is must before either of the houses of parliament may even debate a bill affecting the sovereign's prerogatives or interests.

=== Executive ===
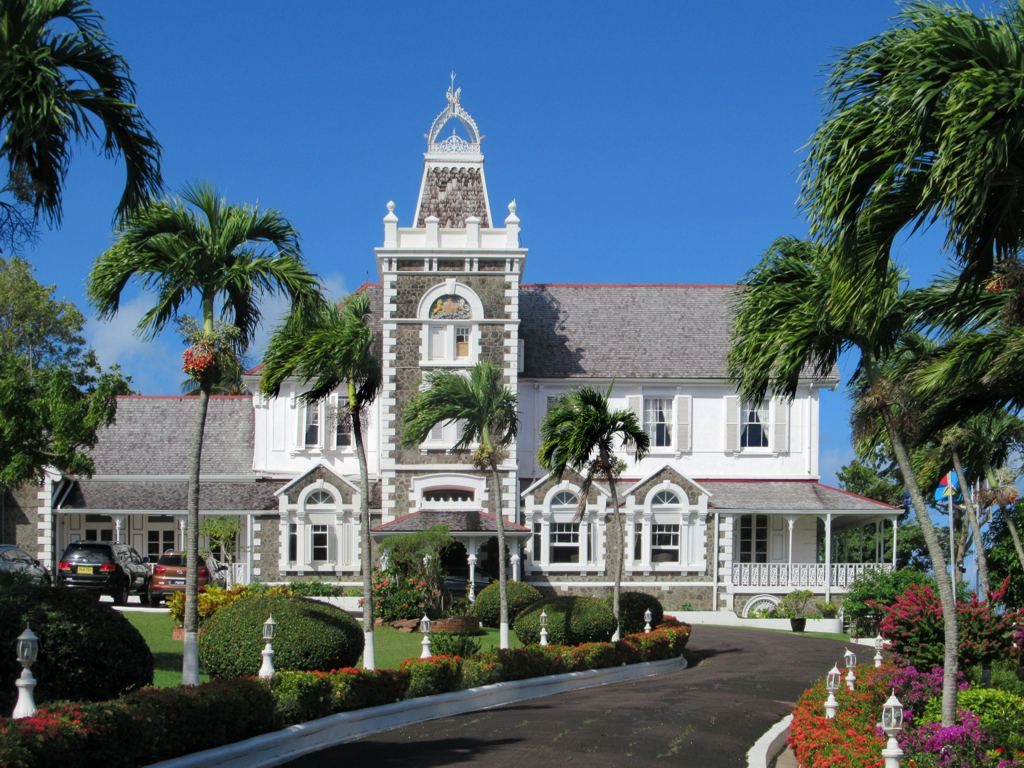
Government House, Castries, the official residence of the governor-general of Saint Lucia

One of the main duties of the Crown is to appoint a prime minister, who thereafter heads the cabinet and advises the monarch or governor-general on how to execute their executive powers over all aspects of government operations and foreign affairs. The monarch's, and thereby the viceroy's role is almost entirely symbolic and cultural, acting as a symbol of the legal authority under which all governments and agencies operate, while the Cabinet directs the use of the Royal Prerogative, which includes the privilege to declare war, and maintain the King's peace, as well as to summon and prorogue parliament and call elections. However, the Royal Prerogative belongs to the Crown and not to any of the ministers, though it might have sometimes appeared that way, and the constitution allows the governor-general to unilaterally use these powers in relation to the dismissal of a prime minister, dissolution of parliament, and removal of a judge in exceptional, constitutional crisis situations.

There are also a few duties which are specifically performed by the monarch, such as appointing the governor-general.

The governor-general, to maintain the stability of the government of Saint Lucia, appoints as prime minister the individual most likely to maintain the support of the Saint Lucian House of Assembly. The governor-general additionally appoints other ministers, at the direction of the prime minister. The monarch is informed by his viceroy of the acceptance of the resignation of a prime minister and the swearing-in of a new prime minister and other members of the ministry, and he remains fully briefed through regular communications from his Saint Lucian ministers.

=== Foreign affairs ===
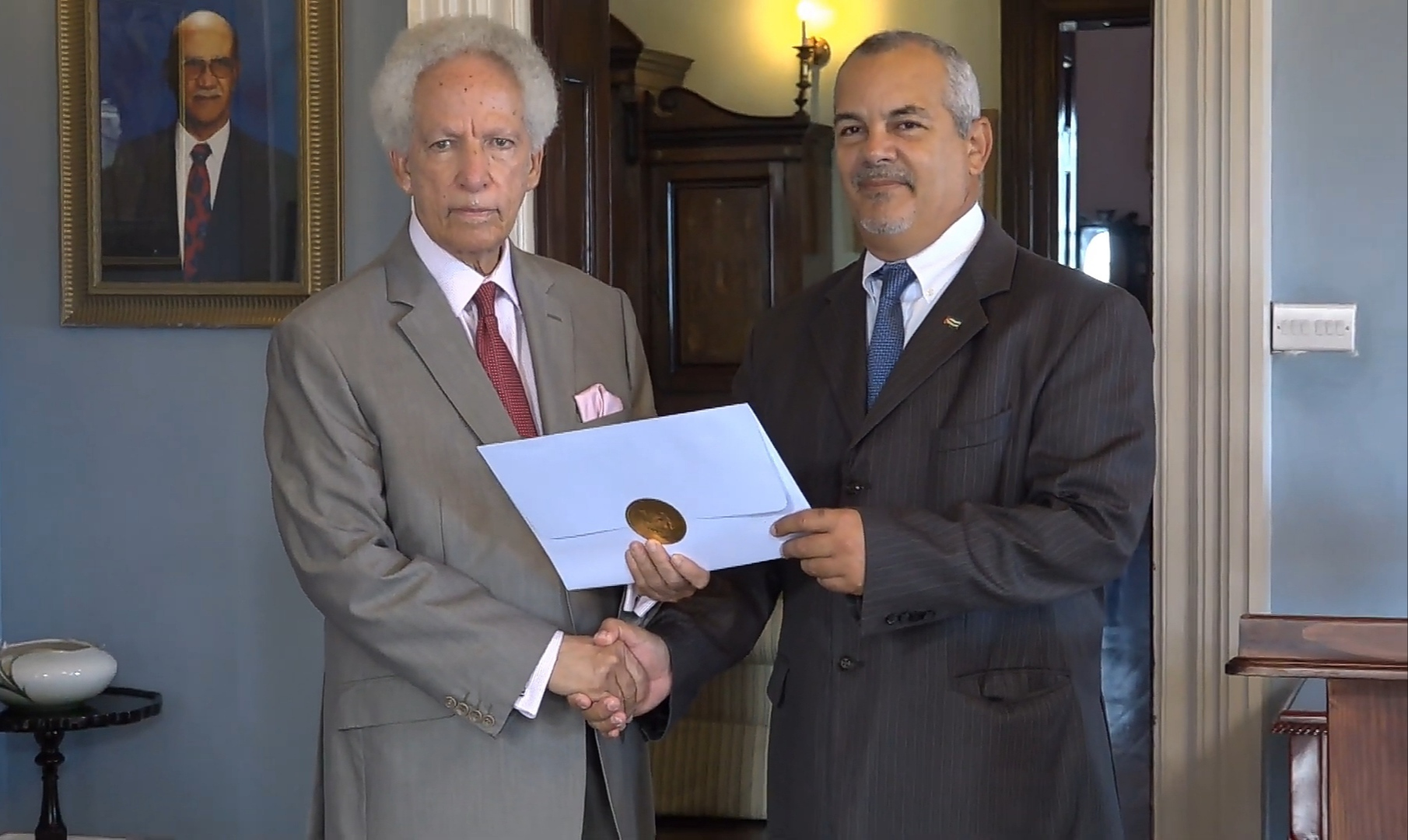
Governor-General Sir Neville Cenac receiving the credentials of Cuban ambassador Alejandro Simancas Marin, 2019

The Royal Prerogative further extends to foreign affairs: the governor-general ratifies treaties, alliances, and international agreements. As with other uses of the Royal Prerogative, no parliamentary approval is required. However, a treaty cannot alter the domestic laws of Saint Lucia; an Act of Parliament is necessary in such cases. The monarch, and by extension the governor-general, also accredits Saint Lucian High Commissioners and ambassadors, and receives diplomats from foreign states.

In foreign policy, the monarch acts solely on the advice of the respective realm government, which can sometimes lead to anomalies in diplomatic recognition. For instance, in 2022, Elizabeth II as Queen of Saint Lucia accredited a new Saint Lucian ambassador to “His Excellency Nicolás Maduro, President of the Bolivarian Republic of Venezuela", whereas, she, as Queen of the United Kingdom, recognised Juan Guaido as Venezuela's head of state.

In addition, the issuance of passports falls under the Royal Prerogative and, as such, all Saint Lucian passports are issued in the monarch's name.

=== Parliament ===
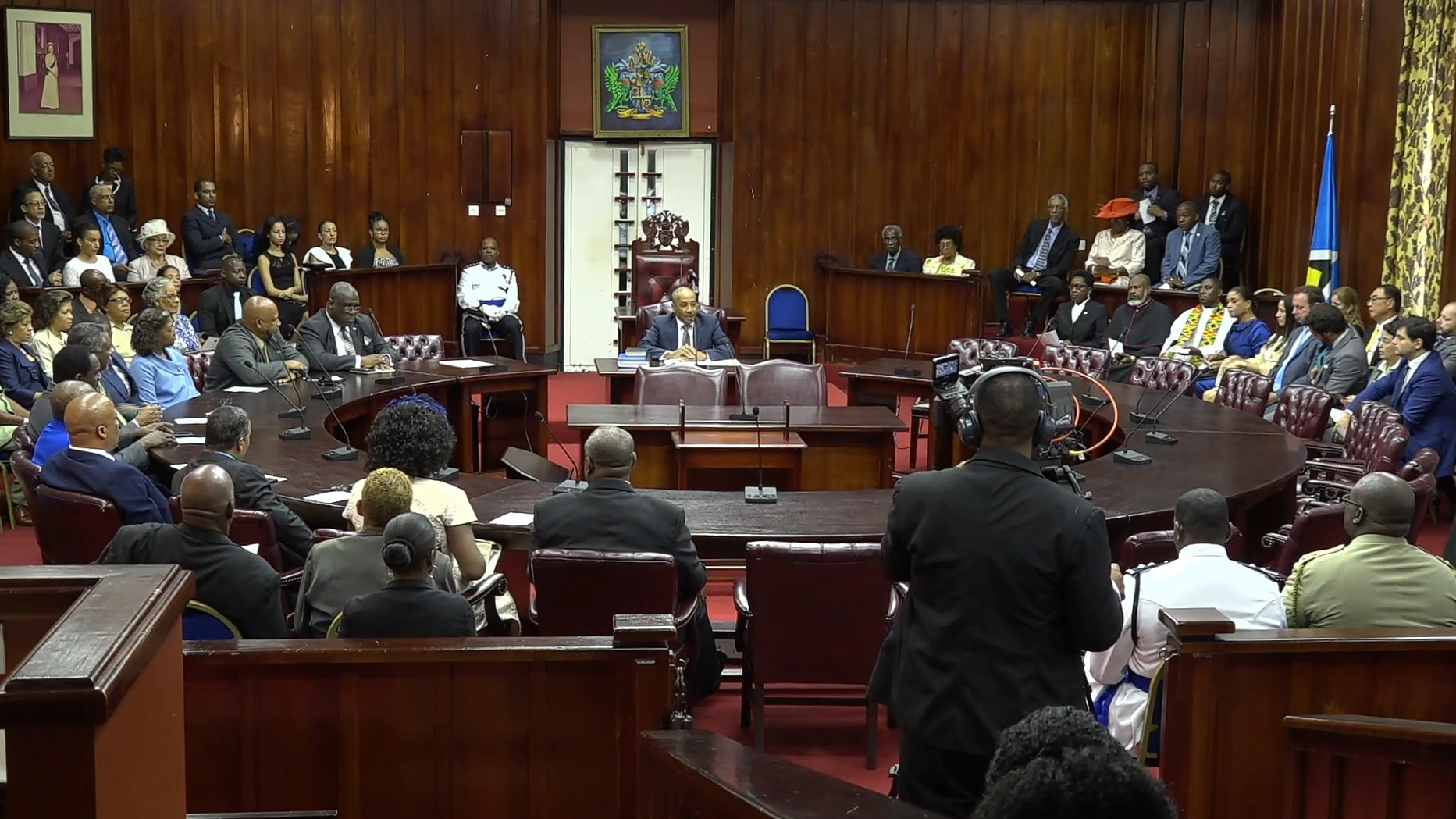
The Queen's portrait (top left) in the chambers of Parliament, 2018

The sovereign, along with the Senate and the House of Assembly, is one of the three components of the Parliament of Saint Lucia.

The monarch does not, however, participate in the legislative process; the viceroy does, though only in the granting of Royal Assent. Further, the constitution outlines that the governor-general alone is responsible for appointing senators. The viceroy must make six senatorial appointments on the advice of the prime minister, three on the advice of leader of the opposition, and two at his or her own discretion. The viceroy additionally summons, prorogues, and dissolves parliament; after the latter, the writs for a general election are usually dropped by the governor-general at Government House, Castries.

The new parliamentary session is marked by the Opening of Parliament, during which the monarch or the governor-general reads the Speech from the Throne. A pledge of loyalty and allegiance to the monarch by members of the House of Assembly and the Senate, coincides with the opening of a session of Parliament.

All laws in Saint Lucia are enacted only with the viceroy's granting of Royal Assent in the monarch's name. Thus, bills begin with the phrase: "Be it enacted by the King's Most Excellent Majesty, by and with the advice and consent of the House of Assembly and the Senate of Saint Lucia, and by the authority of the same, as follows". The Royal Assent, and proclamation, are required for all acts of parliament, usually granted or withheld by the governor-general, with the Public Seal of Saint Lucia.

=== Courts ===
The Sovereign is deemed the "fount of justice," and is responsible for rendering justice for all subjects. The Sovereign does not personally rule in judicial cases; instead, judicial functions are performed in his or her name. In Saint Lucia, criminal offences are legally deemed to be offences against the sovereign, and proceedings for indictable offences are brought in the sovereign's name in the form of The King [or Queen] versus [Name]. Hence, the common law holds that the sovereign "can do no wrong"; the monarch cannot be prosecuted in his or her own courts for criminal offences.

The governor-general, on behalf of the monarch of Saint Lucia, can also grant immunity from prosecution, exercise the royal prerogative of mercy, and pardon offences against the Crown, either before, during, or after a trial. The exercise of the 'Prerogative of mercy' to grant a pardon and the commutation of prison sentences is described in section 74 of the Constitution.

== Cultural role ==
=== The Crown and Honours ===
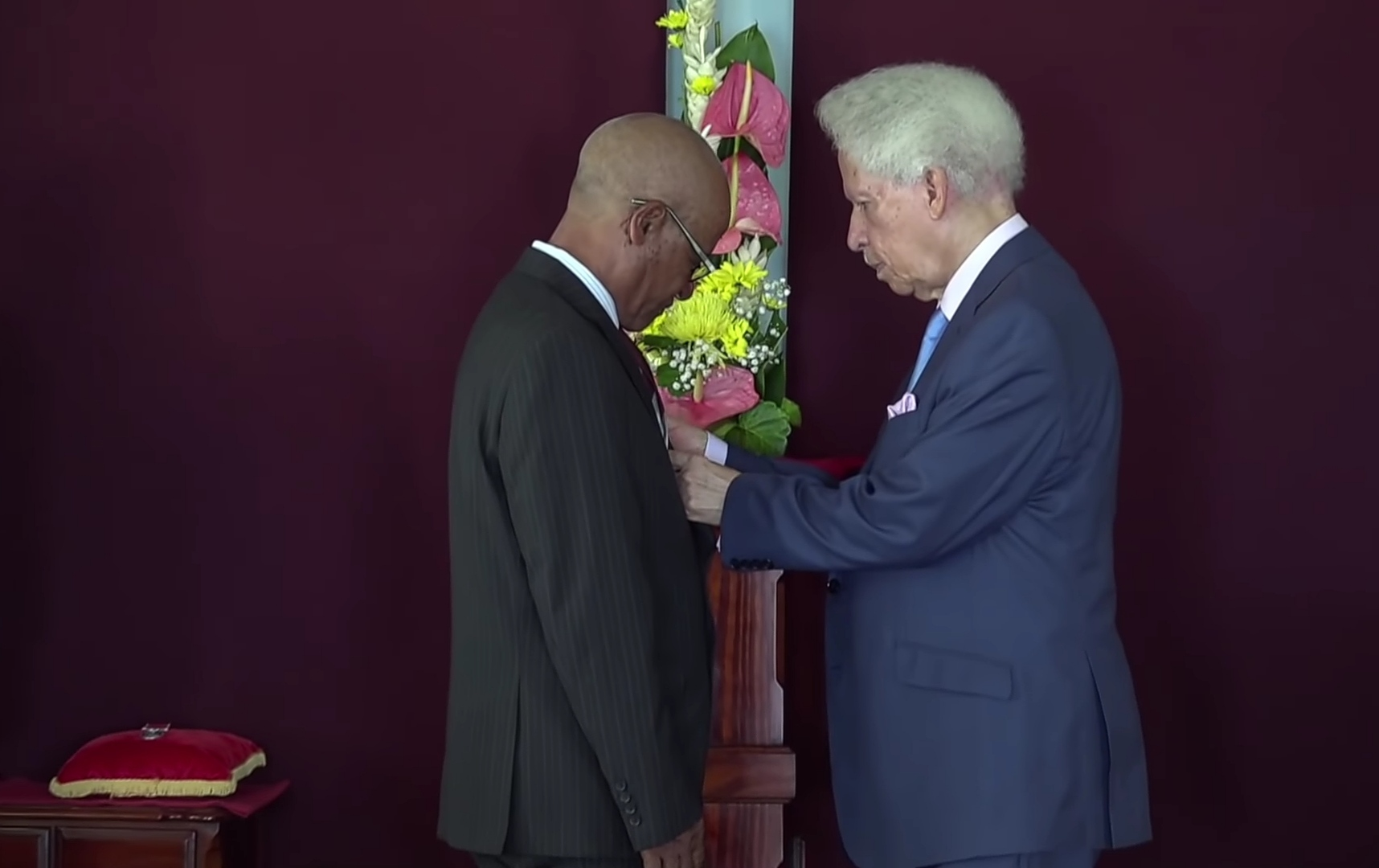
Queen's Birthday Honours Investiture Ceremony, 2018

Within the Commonwealth realms, the monarch is deemed the fount of honour. Similarly, the monarch, as Sovereign of Saint Lucia, confers awards and honours in Saint Lucia in his name. Most of them are often awarded on the advice of "His Majesty's Saint Lucia Ministers".

Saint Lucia's own order of chivalry, called the Order of Saint Lucia, was established on 13 December 1986 by warrant of the Queen of Saint Lucia under a royal sign manual. The Saint Lucian monarch is the Sovereign of the order, while the governor-general serves as the chancellor. In 2016, for the first time in the Order's history, the Queen approved the awarding of the knighthoods and damehoods within the Order of Saint Lucia.

=== The Crown and the Police Force ===
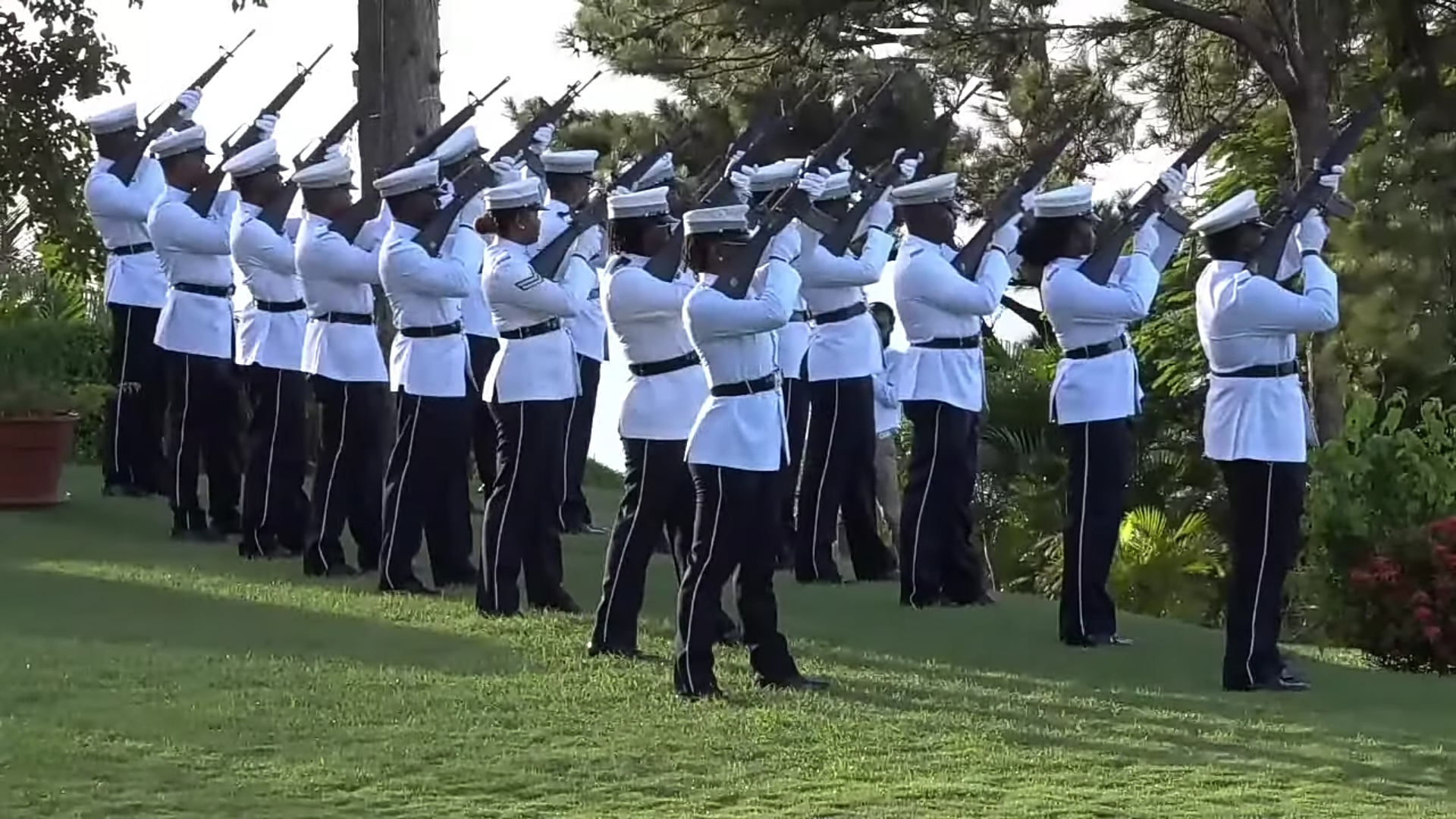
The Royal Saint Lucia Police Force fire a 96-gun salute at Government House, Castries, following the death of Elizabeth II, Queen of Saint Lucia

The national police force of Saint Lucia is known as "The Royal Saint Lucia Police Force".

The St. Edward's Crown appears on the Police's badges and rank insignia, which illustrates the monarchy as the locus of authority.

Every member of the Royal Saint Lucia Police Force has to swear allegiance to the monarch of Saint Lucia, on taking office. Under the Police Act of Saint Lucia, every police officer has to make the following declaration on being appointed:

"I, (name), do hereby swear by Almighty God (or do hereby solemnly and sincerely affirm) that I will be faithful and bear true allegiance to His Majesty King Charles the Third, His Heirs and Successors, and that I will faithfully serve His Majesty the King, His Heirs and Successors during my service in the Saint Lucia Police Force, that I will subject myself to all Acts, orders and regulations relating to the said Force now in force or which may from time to time be in force and will discharge all the duties of a police officer according to law, without fear or favour, affection or ill-will."

=== Saint Lucian royal symbols ===
The main symbol of the Saint Lucian monarchy is the sovereign himself. Thus, framed portraits of him are displayed in public buildings and government offices.

The former Queen also appears on commemorative stamps of Saint Lucia. A crown is also used to illustrate the monarchy as the locus of authority, appearing on police force, postal workers, prison officers, and Royal Saint Lucia Police Force badges and rank insignia.

The flag of the Saint Lucian governor-general featuring St Edward's Crown

The emblem of the Royal Saint Lucia Police Force featuring the Crown

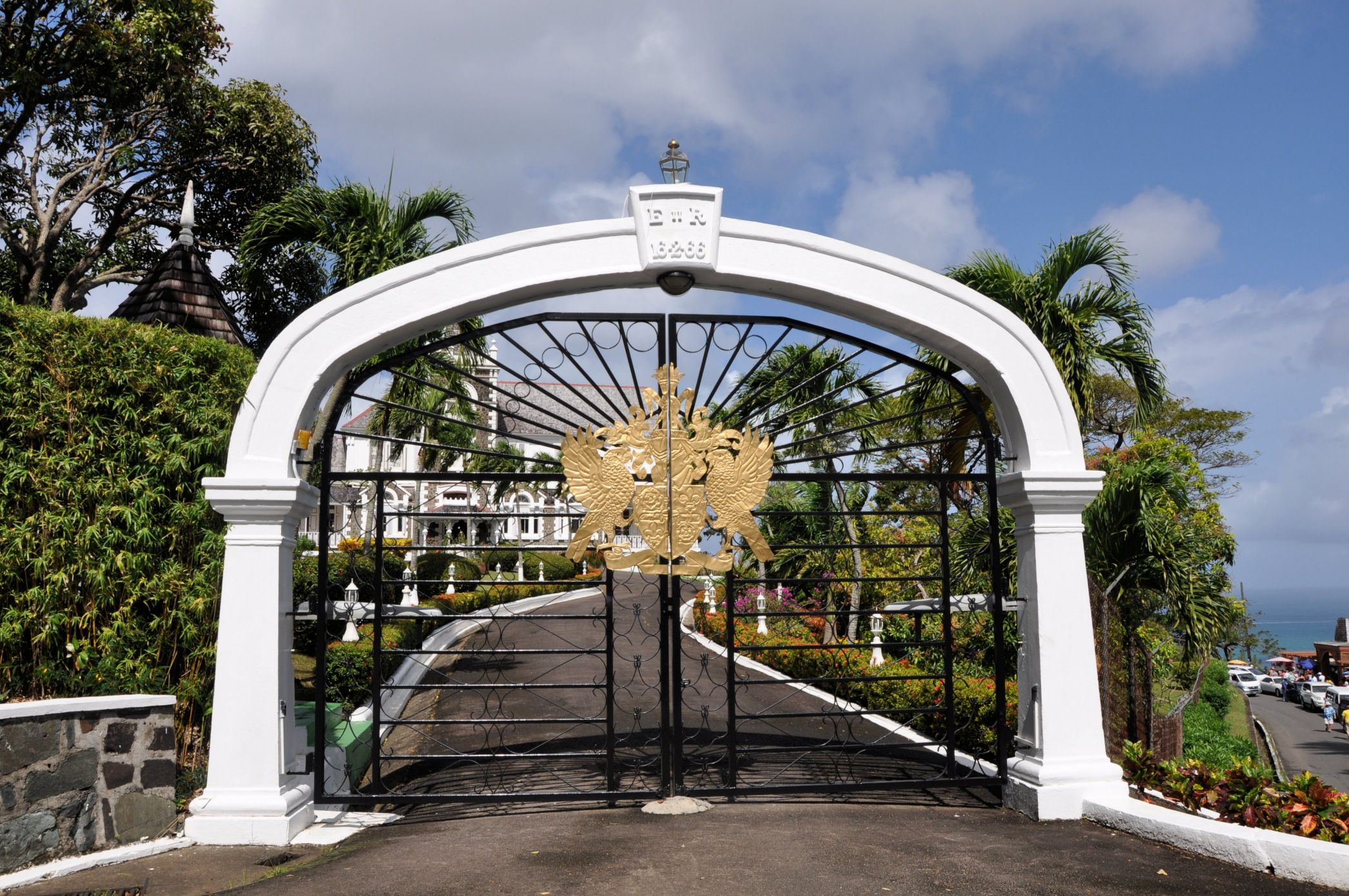
The arch above the gates of Government House featuring an inscription marking the Queen's first ever visit to Saint Lucia on 16 February 1966

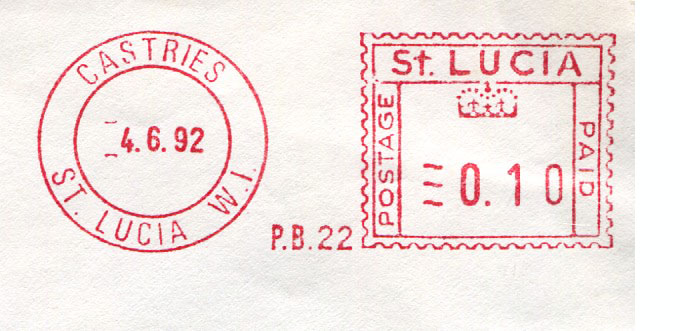
A Saint Lucian meter stamp featuring the Crown

=== Royal visits ===
Elizabeth II and Prince Philip in Saint Lucia, 1966

Several members of the royal family have visited Saint Lucia over the years to highlight some key moments in the country's history.

Queen Elizabeth II first visited Saint Lucia as part of her Caribbean tour of 1966. During her visit she opened the new Winban Research Centre. She and her husband, Prince Philip, Duke of Edinburgh, travelled on HMY Britannia. They were treated to traditional Saint Lucian Dances and a firework display. In 1979 Princess Alexandra, The Honourable Lady Ogilvy represented the Queen at the independence celebrations. In 1985, the Queen laid the foundation stone for the new Red Cross headquarters and visited residential homes for the elderly and schools. They also visited the Girls' Vocational School where they met children involved with The Duke of Edinburgh's Award Scheme.

External videos
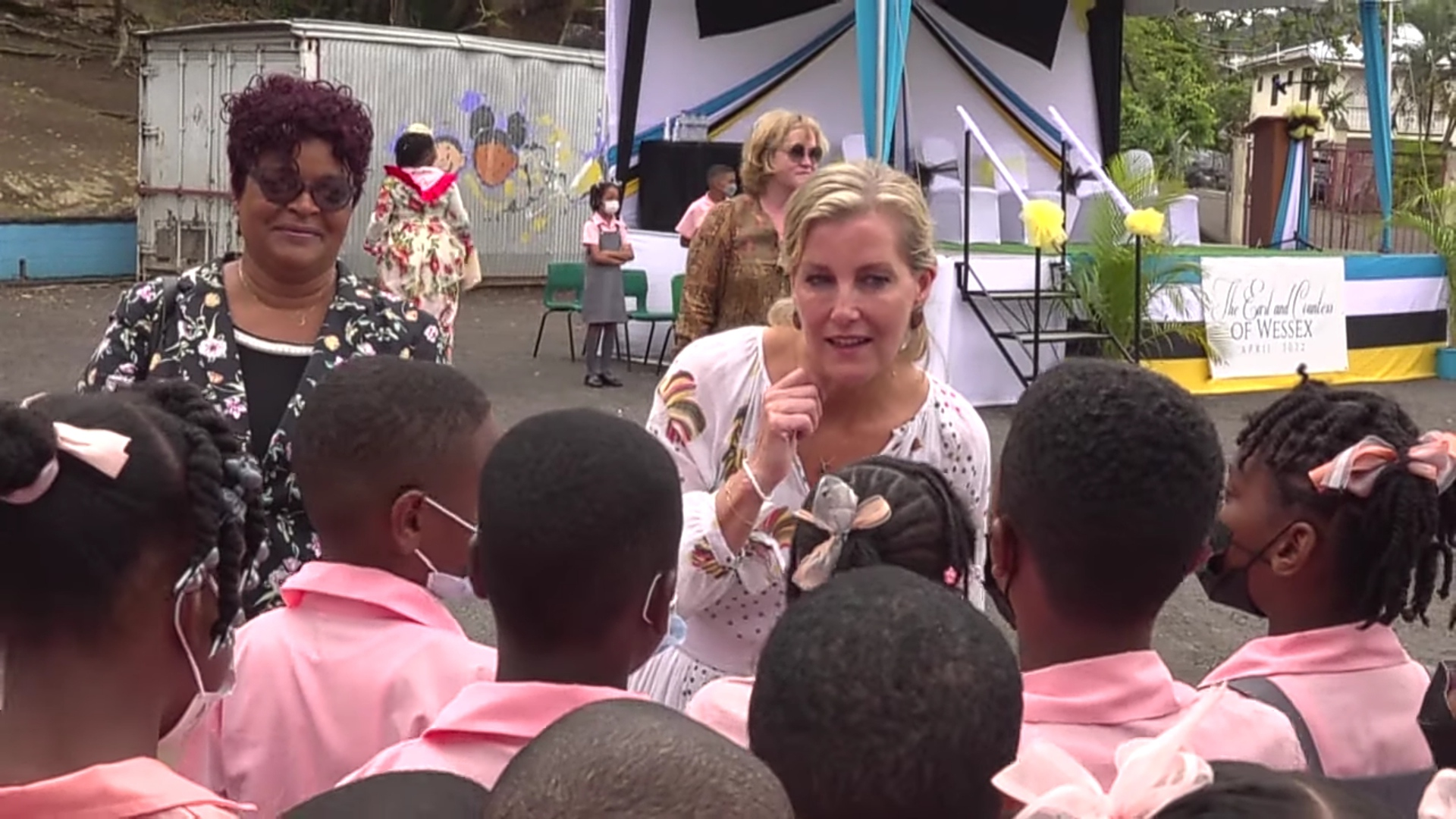
- The Countess of Wessex meeting schoolchildren of Saint Lucia, 2022
- Earl and Countess of Wessex visit Saint Lucia's schools Source: Saint Lucia Government.

Charles, Prince of Wales visited in 1989 to commemorate the tenth anniversary of these celebrations. The Duke of Edinburgh visited in 1998 as chairman of The Duke of Edinburgh's Award. The Duke of York visited Saint Lucia in 2004 to celebrate 25 years of the island's independence. The Prince of Wales and the Duchess of Cornwall visited in March 2008. In 2012, the Earl and Countess of Wessex, visited the country to mark the Queen's Diamond Jubilee, and took part in the independence anniversary celebrations. Prince Harry visited in 2016, when he watched a cricket match, attended a street market and visited conservation projects. Charles, Prince of Wales visited in 2019 to celebrate the 40th anniversary of Saint Lucia's independence, and watched a ceremony and military parade in Castries. The Earl and Countess of Wessex visited in April 2022 to mark the Queen's Platinum Jubilee. During the visit, they attended a Jubilee church service, visited Morne Fortune, met locals in Soufrière, and met pupils from six separate Saint Lucian schools.

== Public opinion ==
A 2023 opinion poll found that 56% supported keeping the monarchy whilst 39% would prefer for Saint Lucia to become a republic.

== List of Saint Lucian monarchs ==
Portrait	Regnal name (Birth–Death)	Reign over Saint Lucia		Full name	Consort	House
Portrait	Regnal name (Birth–Death)	Start	End	Full name	Consort	House
	Elizabeth II (1926–2022)	22 February 1979	8 September 2022	Elizabeth Alexandra Mary	Philip Mountbatten	Windsor
	Elizabeth II (1926–2022)	Governors-general: Sir Allen Montgomery Lewis, Boswell Williams, Sir Stanislaus A. James, Sir George Mallet, Dame Pearlette Louisy, Sir Neville Cenac, Errol Charles (acting); Prime ministers: Sir John Compton, Allan Louisy, Winston Cenac, Vaughan Lewis, Kenny Anthony, Stephenson King, Allen Chastanet, Philip J. Pierre				
	Charles III (b. 1948)	8 September 2022	present	Charles Philip Arthur George	Camilla Shand	Windsor
	Charles III (b. 1948)	Governors-general: Sir Errol Charles; Prime ministers: Philip J. Pierre				

== See also ==
- History of Saint Lucia
- Lists of office-holders
- List of prime ministers of Elizabeth II
- List of prime ministers of Charles III
- List of Commonwealth visits made by Elizabeth II
- Monarchies in the Americas
- List of monarchies
