= Morne Fortune =

Coordinates: 13.98886°N 60.99137°W

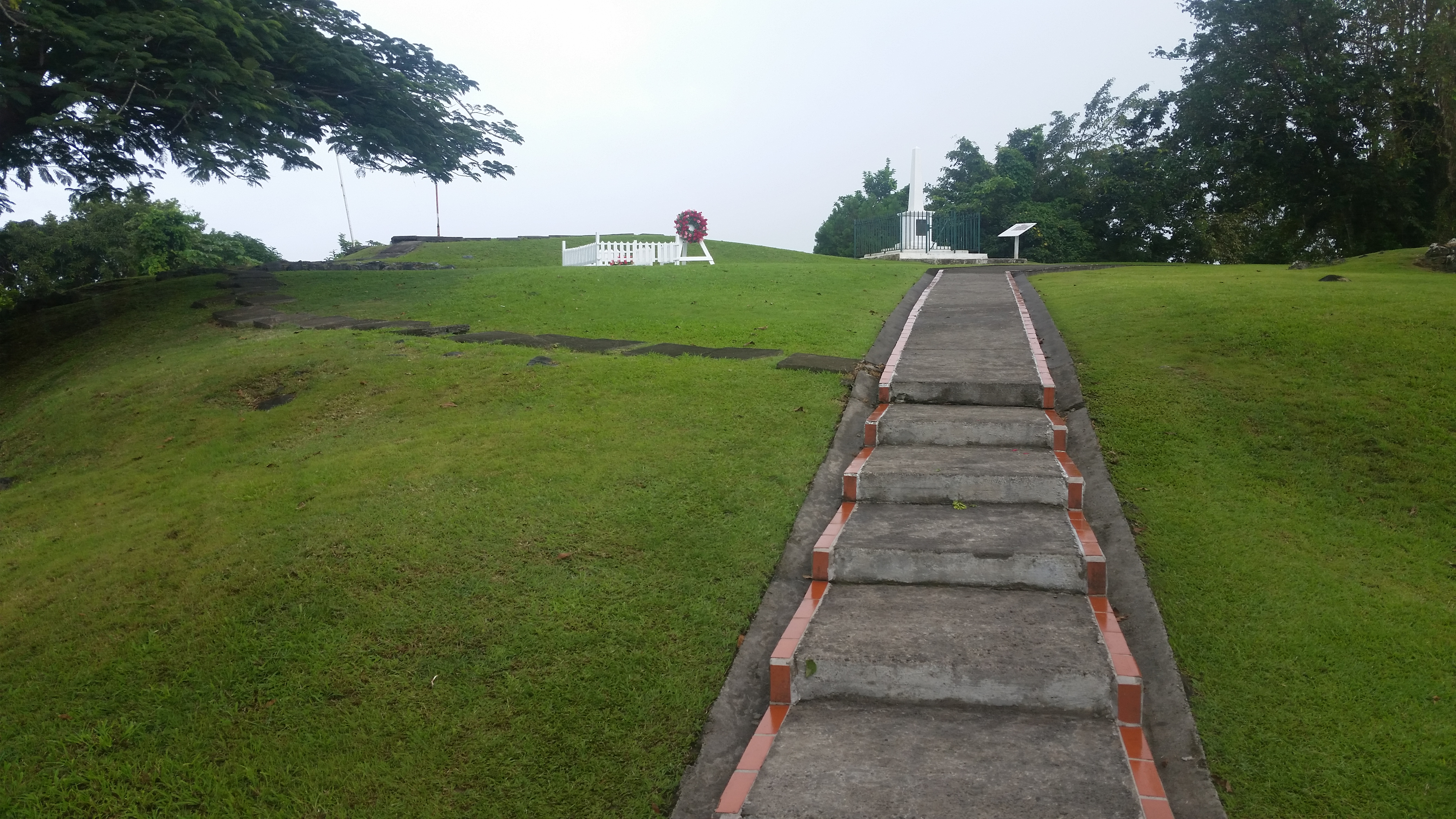
Fort Charlotte's Shipley Battery in Morne Fortune

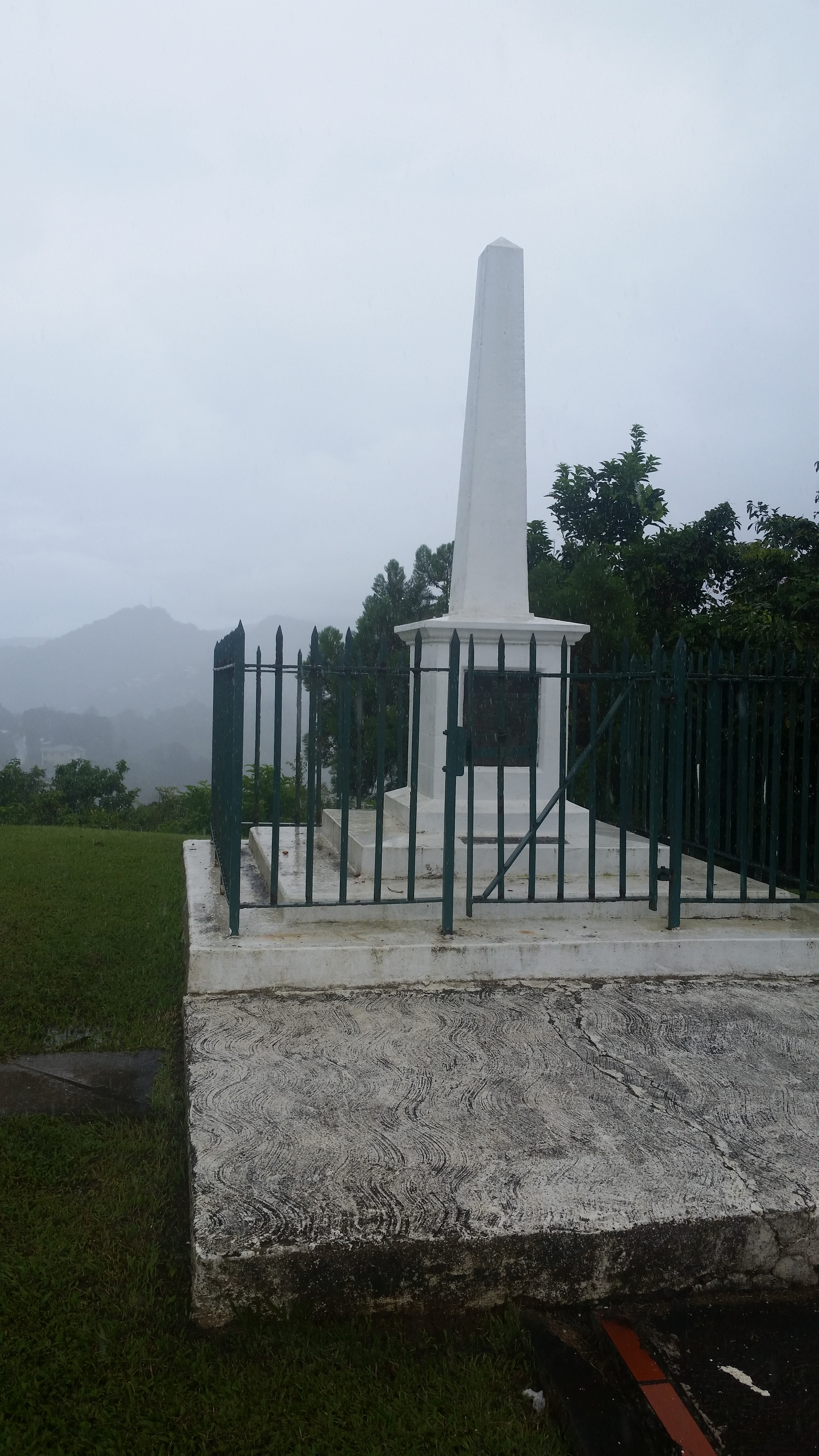
The Inniskilling Monument at Fort Charlotte, which was unveiled on 31 August 1932

Morne Fortune is a hill and residential area located south of Castries, Saint Lucia, in the West Indies.

Originally known as Morne Dubuc, it was renamed Morne Fortuné in 1765 when the French moved their military headquarters and government administration buildings here from Vigie Height. A fort was constructed here by the French, Citadelle du Morne Fortuné, completed in 1784. The fort was first captured by the British on 1 April 1794, but recaptured by the French in June 1795. It was captured again by the British on 24 May 1796. A memorial to the 27th (Inniskilling) Regiment of Foot still stands commemorating the battle. France regained possession in 1802 with the Treaty of Amiens, but Lieutenant-General William Grinfield defeated French Governor Brig. Gen. Antoine Noguès in June 1803, and the fort remained a British one until independence in 1979.

Fort Charlotte was named on 4 April 1794 by Prince Edward, Duke of Kent and Strathearn to honor Queen Charlotte. The 1st West India Regiment manned Apostle's Battery on 16 December 1888 when the port became a coaling station. On 12 November 1890, the Royal Artillery manned four RML 10 inch 18 ton guns. The fort was abandoned in 1905; a Secondary School occupies the site.

The original fortifications also still stand on the summit, and the old military buildings are in a listed historical area. The Saint Lucia National Trust operates this area.

Morne Fortune also hosts the Saint Lucian campus of the University of the West Indies as well as Sir Arthur Lewis Community College.

Government House, the official residence of the Governor-General of Saint Lucia, is on the northern side of Morne Fortune. There are fine views of Castries available from there.
