= Politics of Saint Lucia =

Politics of Saint Lucia takes place in the framework of an independent parliamentary democratic constitutional monarchy, with King Charles III as its head of state, represented by a Governor General, who acts on the advice of the prime minister and the cabinet. The prime minister is the leader of the majority party of the house, and the cabinet conducts affairs of state. The Governor General exercises basically ceremonial functions, but residual powers, under the constitution, can be used at the governor general's discretion. The actual power in St. Lucia lies with the prime minister and the cabinet, usually representing the majority party in parliament.

== History ==
Politics in St. Lucia was once dominated by the United Workers' Party (UWP), which, until 1997 had governed the country for all but three years since independence. John Compton was premier of St. Lucia from 1964 until independence in February 1979.

The Saint Lucia Labour Party (SLP) won the first post-independence elections in July 1979, taking 12 of 17 seats in parliament. A period squabbling within the party ensued, which led to several changes of prime minister. Pressure from the private sector and the unions forced the government to resign in 1982. New elections were then called and were won resoundingly by Compton's UWP, which took 14 of 17 seats.

The UWP was elected for a second time on 16 April 1987, but with only nine of 17 seats. Seeking to increase his slim margin, Prime Minister Compton suspended parliament and called new elections on 30 April. This unprecedented snap election, however, gave the same results as before—the UWP retained nine seats and the SLP eight. In April 1992, Prime Minister Compton's government again defeated the SLP, but this time increased its majority in parliament to 11 of 17 seats.

In 1996, Compton announced his resignation as prime minister in favor of his chosen successor Dr. Vaughan Lewis, former director-general of the Organisation of Eastern Caribbean States (OECS). Dr. Lewis became prime minister and minister of finance, planning and development on 2 April 1996. The SLP also had a change of leadership with former CARICOM official Dr. Kenny Anthony succeeding businessman Julian Hunte.

In elections held 23 May 1997, the St. Lucia Labour Party won all but one of the 17 seats in Parliament, and Dr. Kenny Anthony became Prime Minister and Minister of Finance, Planning and Development on 24 May 1997.

In elections of 3 December 2001 the St. Lucia Labour Party won 14 of the 17 available seats. The leader of the UWP, Dr. Morella Joseph failed to win a seat. Arsene James was appointed the Leader of the Opposition.

In the general elections held on 11 December 2006 the UWP, once again led by Sir John Compton, defeated the SLP, winning 11 of the 17 seats. The next elections in St Lucia are constitutionally due in December 2011. The governing United Workers Party, and the opposition St Lucia Labour Party, along with the newly formed Lucian People's Movement, are expected to contest the next elections.

In June 2016, the United Workers Party (UWP), led by Allen Michael Chastanet, won 11 of the 17 seats in the general election, ousting the St Lucia Labour Party (SLP) of the incumbent Prime Minister Kenny Anthony.

On 29 July 2021, Philip Joseph Pierre was sworn in as the 12th Prime Minister of St Lucia since independence in 1979. St Lucia Labour Party (SLP), led by Pierre, reached a clear victory in general election. The previous SLP administration, led by Kenny Anthony, was during the period 2011-16. The United Workers Party (UWP) governed during the period 2016-21. St Lucia Labour party (SLP) of prime minister Philip Pierre kept its majority in the 2025 election.

== Executive branch ==
As head of state, King Charles III is represented by a governor general who acts on the advice of the prime minister and the cabinet. Following legislative elections, the leader of the majority party or leader of a majority coalition is usually appointed prime minister by the governor general; the deputy prime minister and other ministers is appointed by the governor general.

Main office-holders

The King of Saint Lucia:
Charles III
since
8 September 2022

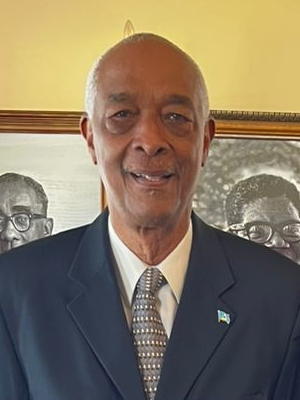
The Acting Governor-General of Saint Lucia:
Felix Finisterre
since
1 August 2026

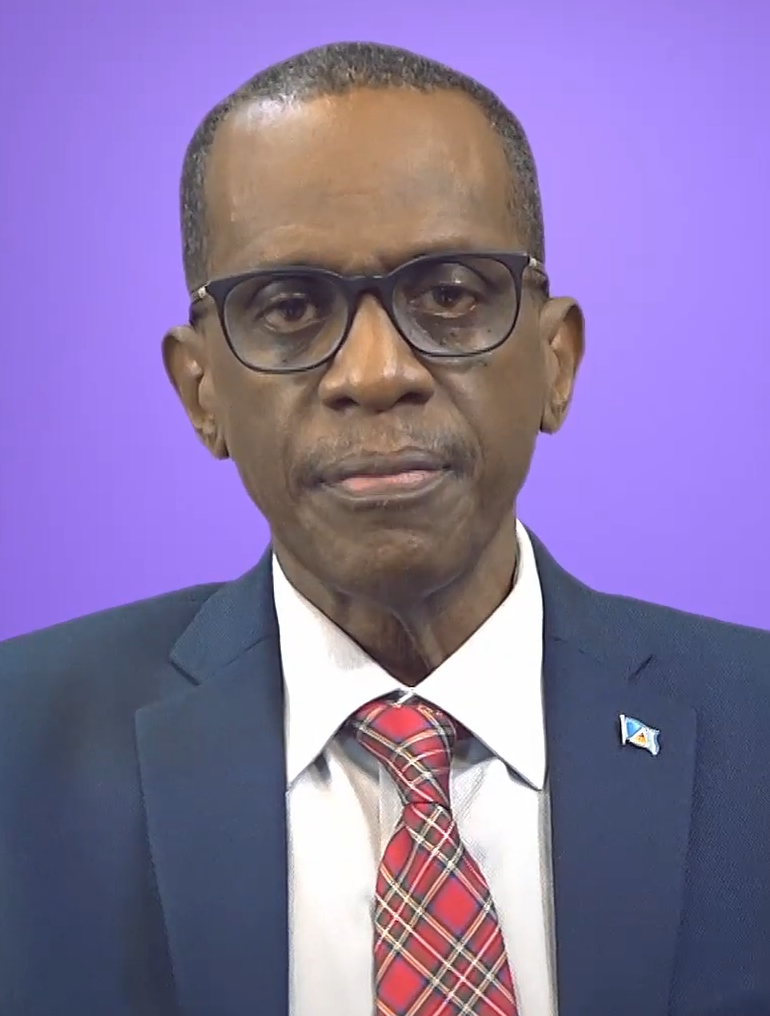
The Prime Minister of Saint Lucia:
Philip J. Pierre
since
28 July 2021

== Legislative branch ==
The Legislature has two chambers. The House of Assembly has 17 members, elected by universal adult suffrage for a five-year term in single-seat constituencies. The Senate has 11 members appointed by the governor general. The parliament may be dissolved by the governor general at any point during its five-year term, either at the request of the prime minister—in order to take the nation into early elections—or at the governor general's own discretion, if the house passes a vote of no-confidence in the government.

== Judicial branch ==
St. Lucia has an independent judiciary composed of district courts and a high court. Cases may be appealed to the Eastern Caribbean Supreme Court and, ultimately, to the Caribbean Court of Justice in Port of Spain. The island is divided into 10 administrative divisions, including the capital, Castries. Popularly elected local governments in most towns and villages perform such tasks as regulation of sanitation and markets and maintenance of cemeteries and secondary roads. St. Lucia has no army but maintains a paramilitary Special Service Unit within its police force and a coast guard.

== Electoral boundaries ==
Electoral boundaries of Saint Lucia

Saint Lucia's electoral boundaries are based, generally, on the 10 districts of Saint Lucia. There are 17 constituencies in Saint Lucia.

District	Constituencies
Gros Islet	Gros Islet
Castries	Babonneau, Castries East, Castries South, Castries South East, Castries North, Castries Central
Anse la Raye and Canaries	Anse la Raye and Canaries
Soufrière	Soufrière
Laborie	Laborie
Vieux Fort	Vieux Fort North, Vieux Fort South
Micoud	Micoud North, Micoud South
Dennery	Dennery South, Dennery North
Choiseul	Choiseul

== See also ==
- Foreign relations of Saint Lucia
- Governor-General of Saint Lucia
