= Errol Charles =

Governor-General of Saint Lucia from 2024 to 2026

Sir Errol Charles GCSL GCMG
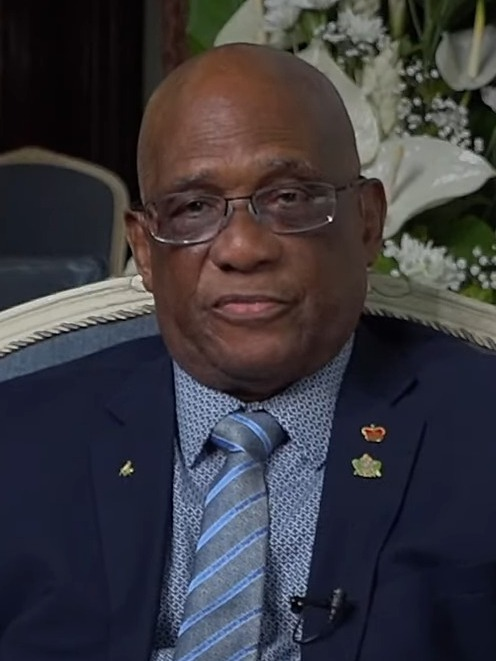
- Charles in 2022

7th Governor-General of Saint Lucia
- In office 1 November 2024 – 31 July 2026; Acting: 11 November 2021 – 31 October 2024
- Monarchs: Elizabeth II; Charles III
- Prime Minister: Philip J. Pierre
- Preceded by: Neville Cenac
- Succeeded by: Felix Finisterre (acting)

Personal details
- Born: Cyril Errol Melchiades Charles; 10 December 1942 (age 83) Castries, Saint Lucia
- Spouse: Anysia Samuel
- Parent: George Charles (father)

Sir Cyril Errol Melchiades Charles GCSL GCMG (born 10 December 1942) is a Saint Lucian politician, who served as the governor-general of Saint Lucia from 2024 to 2026. He previously served as acting governor-general for three years, following the resignation of Neville Cenac.

== Early life and education ==
Charles was born on 10 December 1942 in Castries, Saint Lucia.

He attended St. Aloysius R.C. Boys' School, Castries, and later studied at St. Mary's College, Saint Lucia. At Wolsey Hall, England, Charles completed his correspondence in English, Mathematics, History, Political Science (including the Constitution of the United Kingdom). He completed a course in income tax law and a three month training course in examination of accounts in Trinidad and Tobago.

== Career ==
=== 1962–1992 ===
From 1962 to 1992, Charles worked in the following departments of the Government of Saint Lucia:

- Temporary Clerk in the Treasury Department of the Accountant General Chambers.
- Junior Clerk, Income Tax Inspector, and later Senior Income Tax Inspector in the Inland Revenue Department.
- Senior Licensing Officer in the Ministry of Communications Works, Transport and Public Utilities.

=== 1993–2021 ===
From 1993 to 2007, Charles worked as a Human Resources Manager and a Legislative Officer in J.Q. Charles Limited.

In 2007, he became self employed and worked as a Tax Management Consultant till 2021.

=== Governor-General ===
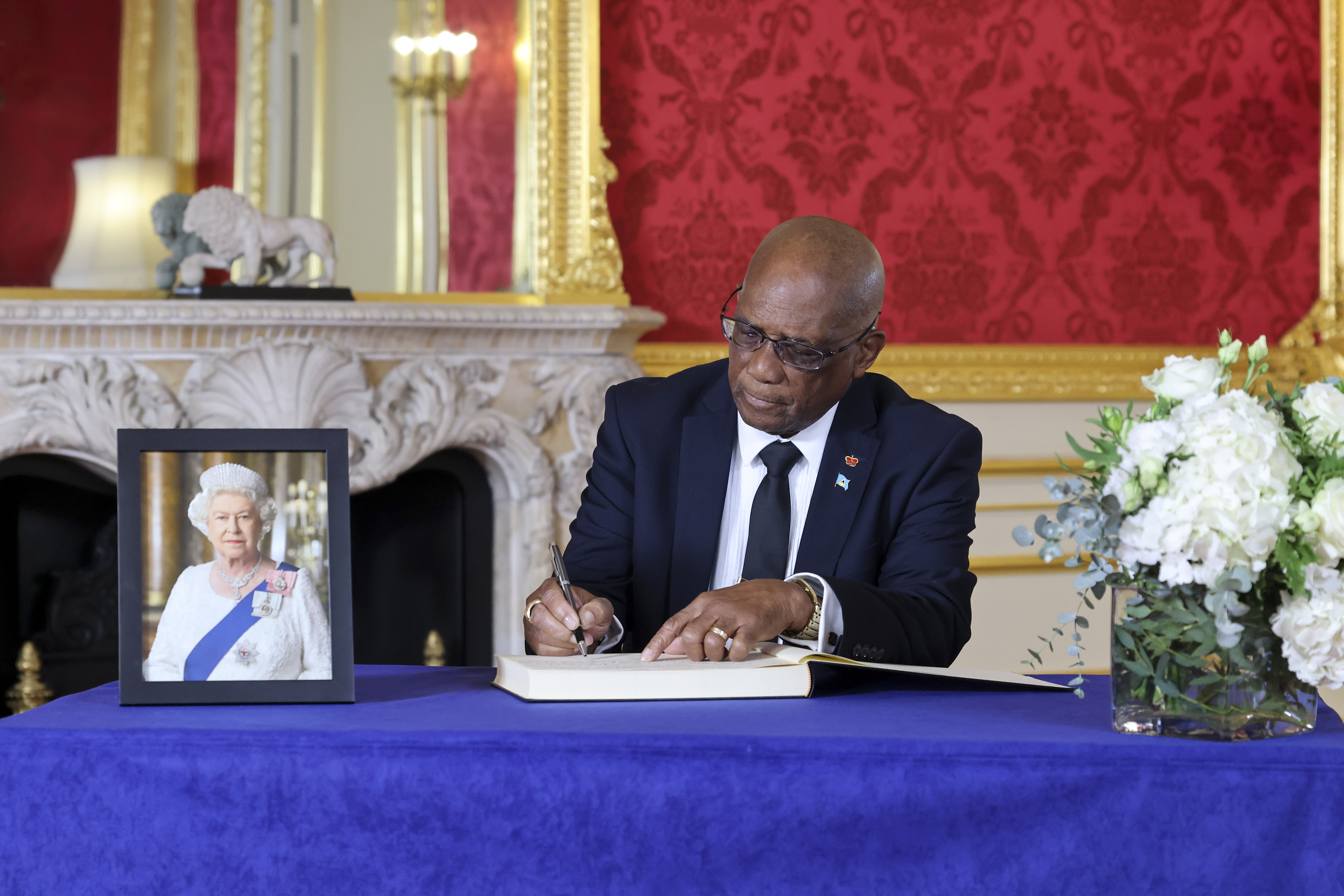
Charles signing the book of condolence for Queen Elizabeth II at Lancaster House on 17 September 2022

Elizabeth II, Queen of Saint Lucia, appointed Charles as the acting governor-general of Saint Lucia following the resignation of Sir Neville Cenac. Charles was sworn in at Government House, Saint Lucia on 11 November 2021.

Upon the death of Queen Elizabeth II in September 2022, Charles said that "Her Majesty, as the head of the Commonwealth and Queen of Saint Lucia has served us with great pride and dignity and will be sincerely missed". He also represented Saint Lucia at the Queen's state funeral in the United Kingdom. The next year, Charles represented the country at the coronation of King Charles III at Westminster Abbey.

On 23 January 2025, it was announced by the government of Saint Lucia that Charles had been appointed governor-general of Saint Lucia by Charles III, King of Saint Lucia, with effect from 1 November 2024, following three years of him "acting" in the role.

Charles was appinted a Knight Grand Cross of the Order of St Michael and St George (GCMG) on 1 November 2024, and was invested as such by King Charles III during an audience at Buckingham Palace on 13 March 2025.

He demitted office on 31 July 2026.

== Personal life ==
Charles is a Roman Catholic and speaks English and French Creole.

He is married to Anysia Samuel.

Government offices
| Preceded by Neville Cenac | Governor-General of Saint Lucia; 2024–2026 | Succeeded by Felix Finisterre |
