= Saint Lucia National Trust =

The Saint Lucia National Trust is a non-profit organization established by statute in 1975 on the island nation of Saint Lucia. It is charged "to conserve the natural and cultural heritage of Saint Lucia, and to promote values which lead to national pride and love of country." It is a member of the Caribbean Initiative.

The Trust is administered by an 11-person council, seven of whom are elected directly by the organization's general membership.

The Trust manages a number of different types of areas, including national landmarks (of which there is currently one: Pigeon Island National Landmark), historic sites (Morne Fortune), nature reserves (Maria Islands Nature Reserve, Anse La Liberte) and environmental protection areas (Pointe Sable Environmental Protection Area).
