= Morella Joseph =

Saint Lucian politician

Dr. Morella Joseph is a politician in the Caribbean island nation of Saint Lucia. After the unexpected resignation of Vaughan Lewis, Joseph was elected to the position in October 2000 and became the leader of Saint Lucia's United Workers' Party. In the elections of the same year, Morella ran for a seat in the Parliament of Saint Lucia but was defeated by the candidate of the Saint Lucia Labour Party.

== See also ==
- United Workers' Party (Saint Lucia)
- Politics of Saint Lucia
