= Neville Cenac =

Governor-General of Saint Lucia from 2018 to 2021

The Honourable Sir Neville Cenac GCSL GCMG
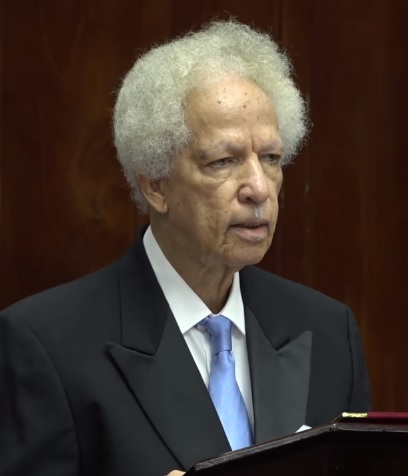

6th Governor-General of Saint Lucia
- In office 12 January 2018 – 31 October 2021
- Monarch: Elizabeth II
- Prime Minister: Allen Chastanet; Philip J. Pierre
- Preceded by: Pearlette Louisy
- Succeeded by: Errol Charles

President of the Senate of Saint Lucia
- In office October 1993 – June 1997
- Prime Minister: John Compton; Vaughan Lewis
- Preceded by: Emmanuel Henry Giraudy
- Succeeded by: Hilford Deterville

Minister of Foreign Affairs
- In office 1987–1992
- Preceded by: John Compton
- Succeeded by: George Mallet

Personal details
- Born: 24 November 1939 Castries, Saint Lucia, British Windward Islands
- Died: 2 June 2026 (aged 86)
- Party: Saint Lucia Labour Party (1968–1987); United Workers Party (from 1987)
- Relatives: Winston Cenac (brother)

Sir Emmanuel Neville Cenac GCSL GCMG (24 November 1939 – 2 June 2026) was a Saint Lucian politician who served as the governor-general of Saint Lucia from 2018 to 2021. Previously, he served as the Minister of Foreign Affairs from 1987 to 1992.

== Early life ==
Cenac was born in Castries, Saint Lucia, British Windward Islands on 24 November 1939. He was the brother of Prime Minister Winston Cenac, who was the head of government for eight months from 1981 to 1982. Cenac joined the Saint Lucia Labour Party in 1968. He was the mayor of Castries from 1981 to 1982, when he resigned to become the leader of Labour Party and the Leader of the Opposition in 1982.

== Career ==
=== Opposition parliamentarian ===
Cenac was the Leader of the Opposition in December 1982, during a constitutional dispute over the status of Governor-General Boswell Williams. John Compton, the serving prime minister and a member of the governing United Workers Party, had taken steps to have Williams unseated. In response, Cenac wrote a letter to Elizabeth II, Queen of Saint Lucia, asking her to disregard Compton's actions. The dispute ended when Williams resigned on 13 December 1982.

He was returned as a Labour Party member of the Saint Lucian parliament during the country's two successive elections in April 1987.

The website of the Saint Lucia Labour Party indicates that Cenac was elected for the Laborie constituency in two elections as well as representing the party at the municipal level in Castries.

=== Cabinet minister ===
Cenac changed his political affiliation on 2 June 1987, joining the United Workers Party group in parliament and becoming the country's foreign minister. When asked why he changed sides, Cenac simply responded, "broken promises". The change increased the Workers Party's legislative majority from one vote (9–8) to three votes (10–7).

He spoke before the United Nations General Assembly in October 1987, saying that Saint Lucia was considering political union with other small Caribbean nations. He argued that quality of life issues could be improved if the region no longer had to support "seven governors-general, seven prime ministers, [and] 60 ministers for a total population for about 500,000." Cenac also accused Guatemala of threatening the sovereignty of Belize.

In August 1989, Cenac and other Caribbean foreign ministers met with Haitian head of state General Prosper Avril on the subject of future elections in the country.

Cenac served as foreign minister until 1992. He was appointed UWP senator in 1992, and in 1993 was appointed President of the Senate. He was president of the Senate of Saint Lucia from October 1993 to June 1997.

Cenac was appointed as the 6th Governor-General of Saint Lucia on 12 January 2018, under the United Workers Party administration led by Prime Minister Allen Chastanet. He served in the role until 31 October 2021, when he resigned. During his tenure, he served under two prime ministers — Allen Chastanet and Philip J. Pierre, who took office in July 2021 following a general election. Cenac was succeeded as Governor-General by Errol Charles.

== Death ==
Cenac died on 2 June 2026, at the age of 86.

== Honours ==
On 18 January 2018, Cenac was appointed Knight Grand Cross of the Order of St Michael and St George (GCMG) in the 2018 Special Honours.

Also in 2018, Cenac was appointed Grand Cross of the Order of Saint Lucia (GCSL), in his capacity as Chancellor of the Order.

== Works ==
In 2024, Cenac published his autobiography, C’est L’huere – Crossing the Divide.

Government offices
Preceded by Pearlette Louisy	Governor-General of Saint Lucia; 2018–2021	Succeeded by Errol Charles
