= Felix Finisterre =

Saint Lucian politician

His Excellency Felix Finisterre CMG
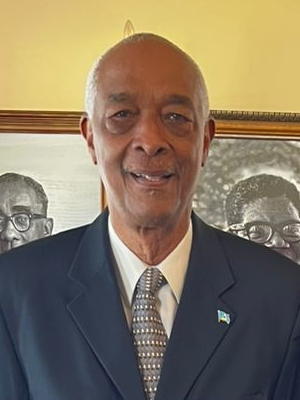
- Finisterre in 2026

Acting Governor-General of Saint Lucia
- Incumbent
- Assumed office 1 August 2026
- Monarch: Charles III
- Prime Minister: Philip J. Pierre
- Preceded by: Errol Charles

Minister for Communications, Transportation, Works and Public Utilities
- In office 10 December 2001 – 15 December 2006
- Prime Minister: Kenny Anthony

Member of the House of Assembly for Babonneau
- In office 3 December 2001 – 17 November 2006
- Preceded by: Morella Joseph
- Succeeded by: Ezechiel Joseph

Personal details
- Party: Saint Lucia Labour Party
- Occupation: Teacher, consultant

Felix Terry Finisterre CMG is a Saint Lucian politician, former teacher and sustainable tourism consultant who has served as acting Governor-General of Saint Lucia since 1 August 2026. He was previously the Saint Lucia Labour Party member of the House of Assembly for Babonneau and a government minister under Prime Minister Kenny Anthony.

== Career ==
Finisterre began his career in education, teaching at St Aloysius Roman Catholic Boys' School, Corinth Junior Secondary and the Teachers' Training College, which was later absorbed as the Teacher Training Division of the Sir Arthur Lewis Community College. He taught for 18 years across all levels of the Saint Lucian education system, and after completing university studies in the United Kingdom he returned home to lecture at the former Saint Lucia Teachers' College.

=== Tourism and development work ===
A Kellogg Fellow since 1989, Finisterre has worked with several local and regional development agencies, including the National Research & Development Foundation and the Small Enterprise Assistance Project in Barbados. He was a Deputy Director of Tourism in the Saint Lucia Tourist Board, under then-Director Agnes Francis and then-Minister Romanus Lansiquot. He was the founding Director of the Saint Lucia Heritage Tourism Programme and of the Soufrière Regional Development Programme, which founded the Soufrière Marine Management Area, described as the first integrated marine management area in the Eastern Caribbean. He also played a leading role in developing the Sulphur Springs as a tourism attraction.

Finisterre has served on national and regional boards and advisory bodies, including the Saint Lucia National Trust, the UNDP Global Environment Facility Small Grants Programme and the Caribbean Natural Resources Institute, and is the Eastern Caribbean representative of the CARICOM–Canada Expert Deployment Mechanism. He headed the sub-regional office of the Caribbean Local Economic Development programme (CARILED), implemented by the Federation of Canadian Municipalities in partnership with the Caribbean Forum of Local Government Ministers, the Caribbean Association of Local Government Authorities and the Commonwealth Local Government Forum, and funded by the Canadian International Development Agency.

== Political career ==
A member of the Saint Lucia Labour Party, Finisterre won the Babonneau seat in the House of Assembly in 2001. He was appointed Minister for Communications, Transportation, Works and Public Utilities on 10 December 2001 in the administration led by Prime Minister Kenny Davis Anthony. He lost the Babonneau seat at the 2006 general election.

=== Acting Governor-General ===
In August 2026, Finisterre was appointed Acting Governor-General of Saint Lucia by King Charles III, on the advice of Prime Minister Philip J. Pierre, with effect from 1 August. He succeeded Sir Errol Charles, who left office on 31 July 2026.
