= Jonathan Baker (judge) =

British judge

The Right Honourable Sir Jonathan Baker
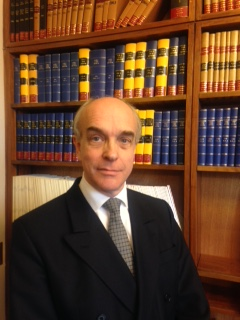
- Baker in 2016

Lord Justice of Appeal
- Incumbent
- Assumed office 2018

Justice of the High Court
- In office 2009–2018

Personal details
- Born: Jonathan Leslie Baker; 6 August 1955 (age 71)
- Education: St John's College, Cambridge
- Occupation: Barrister
- Profession: Barrister

Sir Jonathan Leslie Baker (born 6 August 1955), styled The Rt Hon Lord Justice Baker, is a Judge of the Court of Appeal of England and Wales.

He was educated at St Albans School and St John's College, Cambridge.

He was called to the bar at Middle Temple in 1978. He was a recorder from 2000 to 2009, and judge of the High Court of Justice (Family Division) from 2009 - 2018.

In October 2017, he was appointed as the Senior Family Liaison Judge.

In October 2018, he was appointed as a Judge of the Court of Appeal.
