= Parliament of Saint Lucia =

Bicameral legislature

Type
- Type: Bicameral
- Houses: Senate; House of Assembly

Leadership
- Monarch: Charles III since 8 September 2022
- Governor General: Errol Charles since 11 November 2021
- President of the Senate: Alvina Reynolds, SLP since 24 November 2022
- Speaker of the House of Assembly: Claudius Francis, SLP since 17 August 2021
- Prime Minister: Philip J. Pierre, SLP since 28 July 2021
- Leader of the Opposition: Allen Chastanet, UWP since 28 July 2021

Structure
- Seats: 29 (17 MPs, 11 Senators, 1 Speaker)
- Senate political groups: His Majesty's Government SLP (6) HM Loyal Opposition UWP (3) Others Independent (2)
- Assembly political groups: His Majesty's Government (16) SLP (14) Independent (2) HM Loyal Opposition UWP (1)

Elections
- Last Assembly election: 1 December 2025
- Next Assembly election: 1 December 2030

Meeting place
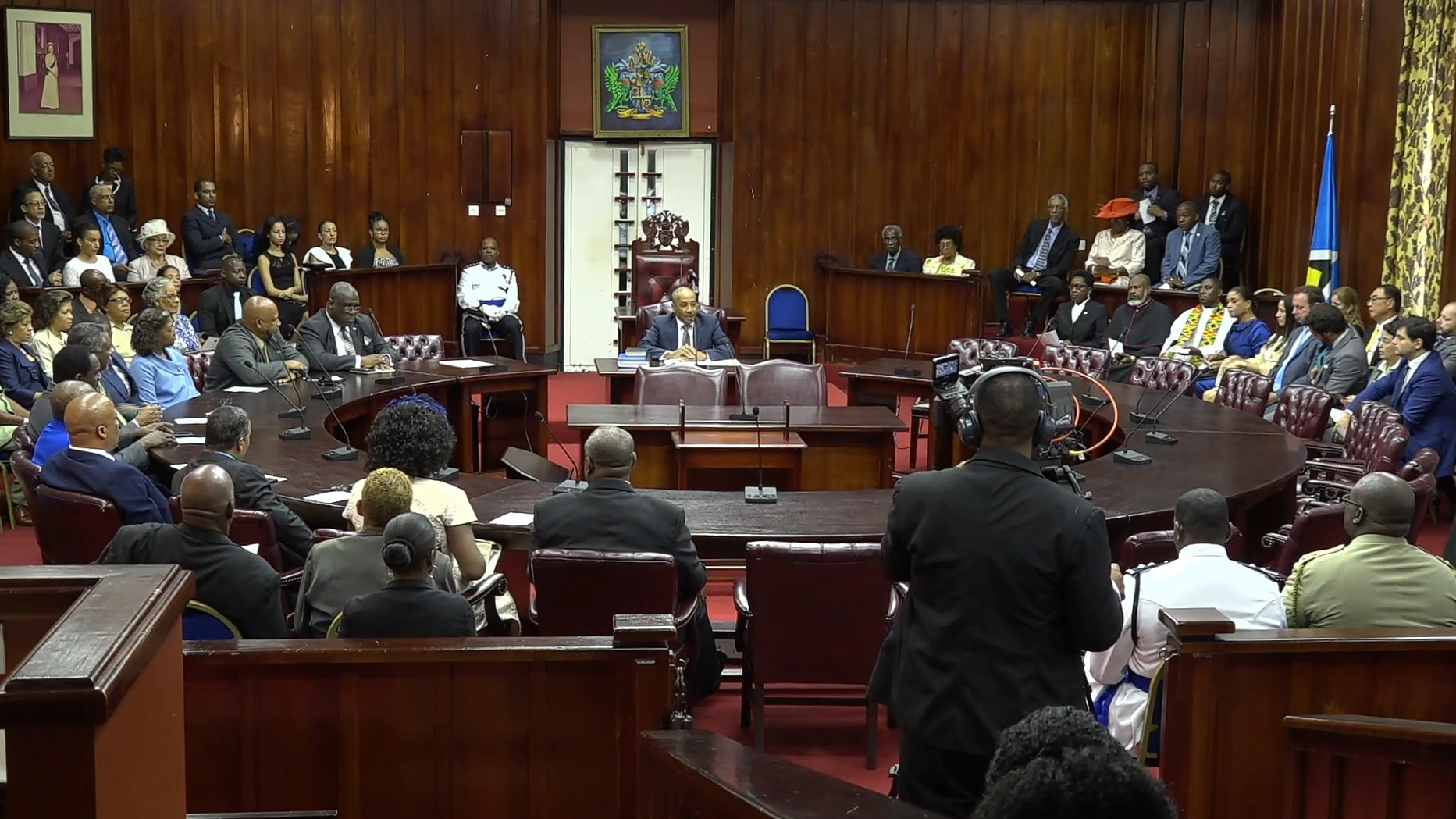
- Castries

Website
- parliament.govt.lc

The Parliament of Saint Lucia is the bicameral legislative branch of the government of Saint Lucia. It consists of the King, who is represented by the governor general, and the 2 parts of the legislature, the Senate and the House of Assembly.

The House of Assembly, the lower chamber, has 17 elected members who each represent a constituency with terms lasting no more than 5 years. The Senate, the upper chamber, has 11 members who are appointed by the governor general based on their own judgement, as well based on the advice of the prime minister and the leader of the opposition.

== Composition ==
Parliament consists of three different elements:

- The monarch, represented by a viceroy, the Governor General
- The Senate, the upper chamber
- The House of Assembly, the lower chamber

=== Monarch ===
Although the sovereign constitutes part of parliament, neither the sovereign nor his viceroy (the governor general), participates in the legislative process. However, Royal Assent is still necessary for a bill to become law.

=== Senate ===
The Senate is the upper house of parliament, consisting of 11 members appointed by the governor general. Six members are appointed based on the advice of the prime minister, whilst three members are appointed based on the advice of the leader of the opposition. The other two members are appointed by the governor general. To be appointed as a senator, one must be at least 21 years old.

=== House of Assembly ===
The House of Assembly is the lower house of parliament, with each member being elected via a plurality of voters in each of the country's 17 constituencies. Members of the House must be at least 21 years old. A parliamentary term lasts no more than 5 years, but Parliament may be dissolved at any time.

== See also ==
- Politics of Saint Lucia
- List of national legislatures
