= Government House, Saint Lucia =

Official residence of the Governor-General of Saint Lucia in Castries

Government House
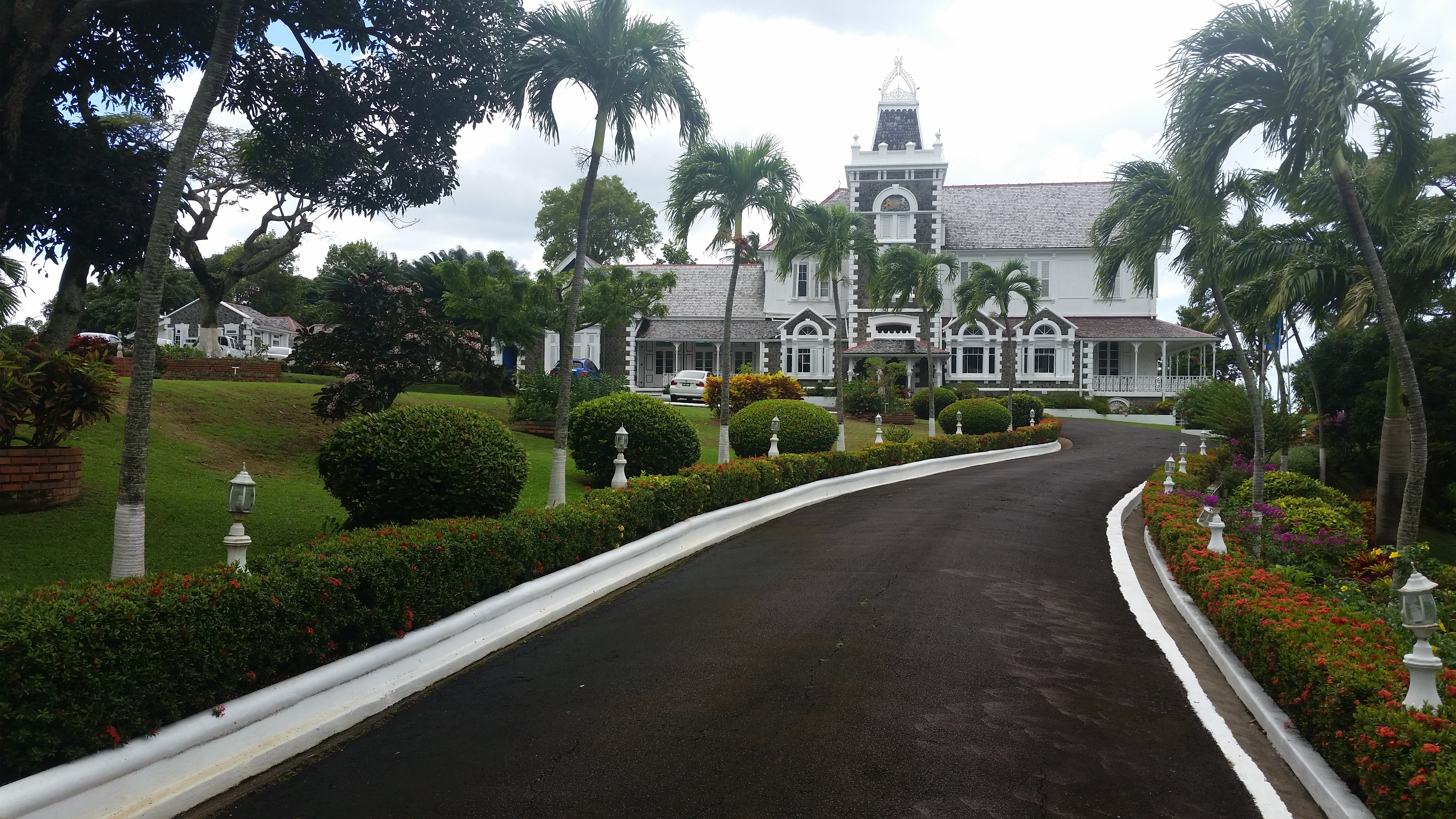
- Government House in January 2018
- Interactive map of the Government House area

General information
- Type: Official residence
- Location: Morne Fortune, Castries, Saint Lucia
- Coordinates: 14.005407°N 60.998325°W
- Construction started: 1894
- Completed: 1895
- Client: Governor-General of Saint Lucia
- Owner: Government of Saint Lucia

Website
- www.governorgeneral.gov.lc/government-house

Government House is the official residence of the governor-general of Saint Lucia. The house is located on the crest of Morne Fortune, near Castries. The current structure was completed in 1895 but earlier Government Houses had been built on the same site in the early 19th century. Government House hosts the Le Pavillon Royal Museum and is available for tours by appointment.

== Earlier houses ==
By 1746 the French administration had government buildings in Vigie but between 1768 and 1771 they moved to the south side of Castries Harbour. By the time of the surrender to the British in 1778 a "Government's House" existed near Morne Fortune. This was to the east of the French fort, but relocated to a site to the west of it by 1796 (possibly because of the destructive 1780 hurricane), by when it was known as the Pavilion. This fell into disrepair by 1816 when the British administration began to construct a new Government House.

The first Government House that was built on the current site was destroyed by a hurricane in 1817, before its completion. A second house, built of timber, was completed on the same spot in 1819. This was timber-built and of 80 by 62 feet (24 m × 19 m) in plan with five bedrooms. In 1844 it was described by the historian Henry Hegart Breen as "a spacious wooden structure, tastefully laid out, and fitted up in a style of elegance worthy the representative of the sovereign" with excellent views of the bay of Castries. This house fell into disrepair, and was abandoned by 1865. Government House then relocated to a nearby disused military barracks. The military roccupied the site in 1888 and a temporary Government House was established on Morne Abercrombie Ridge.

== Current structure ==
Construction of the present brick-built Government House was started on the site of the previous house in 1894, and was completed a year later. It was originally used as the home and office of the Commissioners of Saint Lucia as part of the British Windward Islands until 1958, then for the Administrators of the island as part of the West Indies Federation. From 1967, Government House was used by the Governors of Saint Lucia as one of the self-governing West Indies Associated States. Since Saint Lucia became an independent state in 1979 it has been used by the Governors-General.

At the 2015 United Nations Climate Change Conference, the Government of St Lucia officially announced it would be installing solar panels on the building in partnership with non-profit Solar Head of State, in order to send a message on the importance of renewable energy. Installation was completed by September 2016.

Government House also houses historical documents and artefacts belonging to the Le Pavillon Royal Museum. The museum is open for general admission on Tuesdays and Thursdays with Government House tours available on the same days by appointment only.

== See also ==
- Government Houses of the British Empire and Commonwealth
- Governor-General of Saint Lucia
