= Governor-General of Saint Lucia =

Representative of the monarch

- Gouvènè Jennéwal Sent Lisi
- Coat of arms of Saint Lucia

- Flag of the governor-general

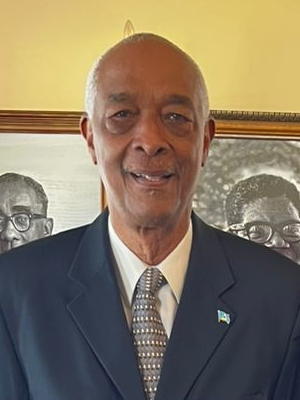
- Incumbent; Felix Finisterre; Acting since 1 August 2026
- Viceroy
- Style: His Excellency
- Residence: Government House, Saint Lucia
- Appointer: Monarch of Saint Lucia on the advice of the prime minister
- Term length: At His Majesty's pleasure
- Formation: 22 February 1979
- First holder: Sir Allen Montgomery Lewis
- Salary: 36,112 USD annually
- Website: governorgeneral.govt.lc

The governor-general of Saint Lucia (Saint Lucian Creole French: Gouvènè Jennéwal Sent Lisi) is the representative of the Saint Lucian monarch, currently King Charles III, in Saint Lucia. The governor-general is appointed by the monarch on the recommendation of the prime minister of Saint Lucia. The functions of the governor-general include appointing ministers, judges, and ambassadors; giving royal assent to legislation passed by parliament; issuing writs for election.

In general, the governor-general observes the conventions of the Westminster system and responsible government, maintaining political neutrality, and has to always act only on the advice of the prime minister. The governor-general also has a ceremonial role: hosting events at the official residence—Government House in the capital, Castries—and bestowing honours to individuals and groups who are contributing to Saint Lucia and to their communities. When travelling abroad, the governor-general is seen as the representative of Saint Lucia and its monarch. The governor-general is supported by a staff headed by the official secretary to the governor-general.

Governors-general formally serve "at the monarch's pleasure". Since 1 August 2026, the acting governor-general has been Felix Finisterre.

The office of the governor-general was created on 22 February 1979, when Saint Lucia gained independence from the United Kingdom as a sovereign state and an independent constitutional monarchy. Since then, seven individuals have served as governor-general.

== Appointment ==
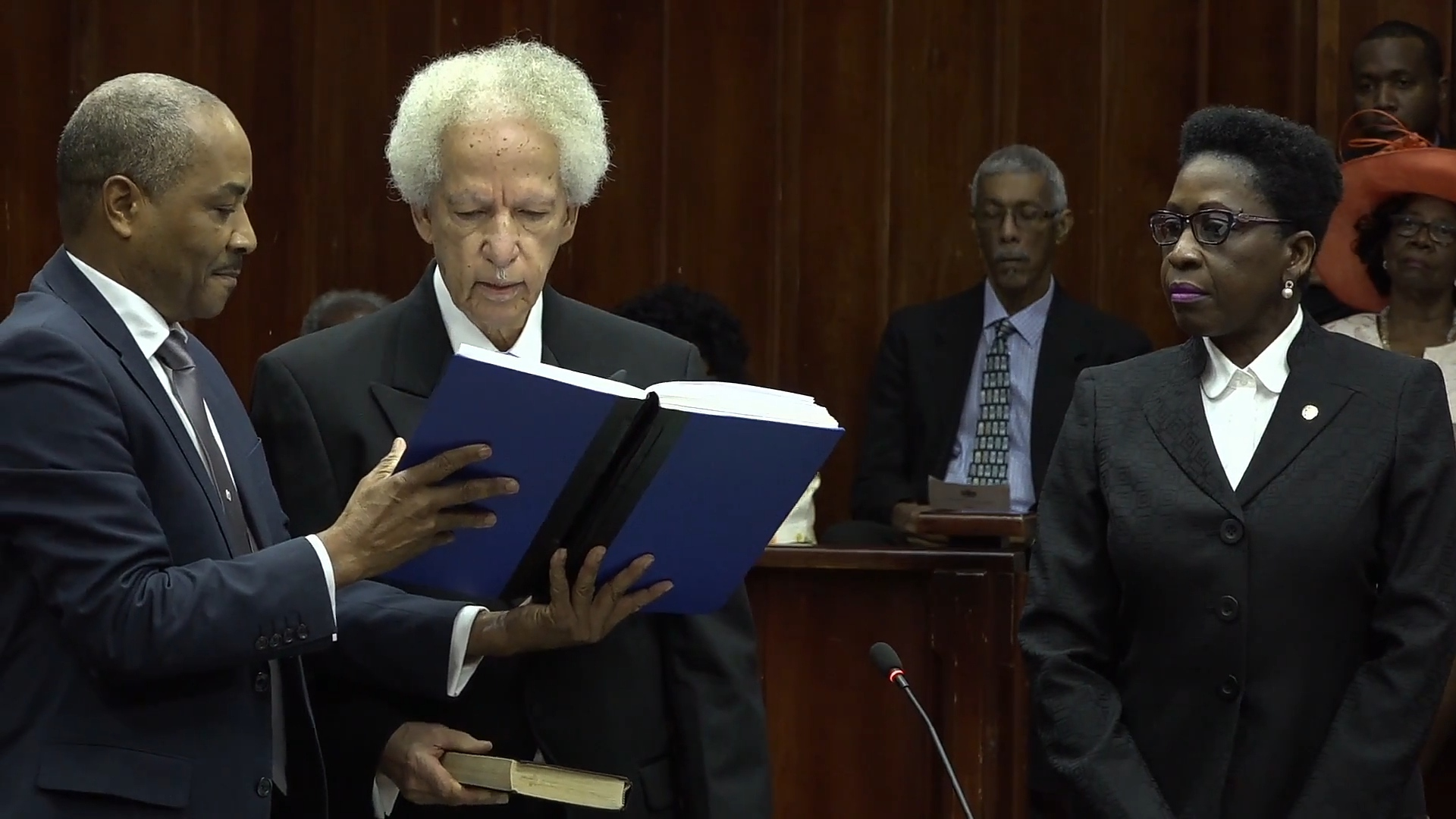
Installation of Neville Cenac as governor-general of Saint Lucia, 2018

The governor-general is formally appointed by the monarch of Saint Lucia. When a new governor-general is to be appointed, the prime minister recommends a name to the monarch, who by convention accepts that recommendation. At the installation ceremony, the new governor-general takes an oath of allegiance and an oath of office.

== Functions ==
Saint Lucia shares the person of the sovereign equally with 14 other countries in the Commonwealth of Nations. As the sovereign works and resides predominantly outside of Saint Lucian borders, the governor-general's primary task is to perform the monarch's constitutional duties on their behalf. As such, the governor-general carries out their functions in the government of Saint Lucia on behalf and in the name of the Sovereign.

The office of governor-general is provided for by Chapter II, Sections 19 to 22 of the Constitution.

=== Constitutional role ===
The governor-general is responsible for appointing the Prime Minister, the Cabinet, members of the Senate, senior civil servants, members of different commissions and boards. The constitution empowers the governor-general to make or revoke appointments to government or public offices and to Commissions and Boards after receiving careful consultation or advice.

The governor-general, on the Sovereign's behalf, gives royal assent to laws passed by the Parliament of Saint Lucia.

The governor-general's constitutional and parliamentary responsibilities also include: declaration of State of Emergency; summoning, prorogation and dissolution of Parliament; and the Prerogative of Mercy.

The governor-general holds weekly meetings with the prime minister on matters of state and governance.

The governor-general may, in certain circumstances, exercise without—or contrary to—ministerial advice. These are known as the reserve powers.

=== Ceremonial role ===
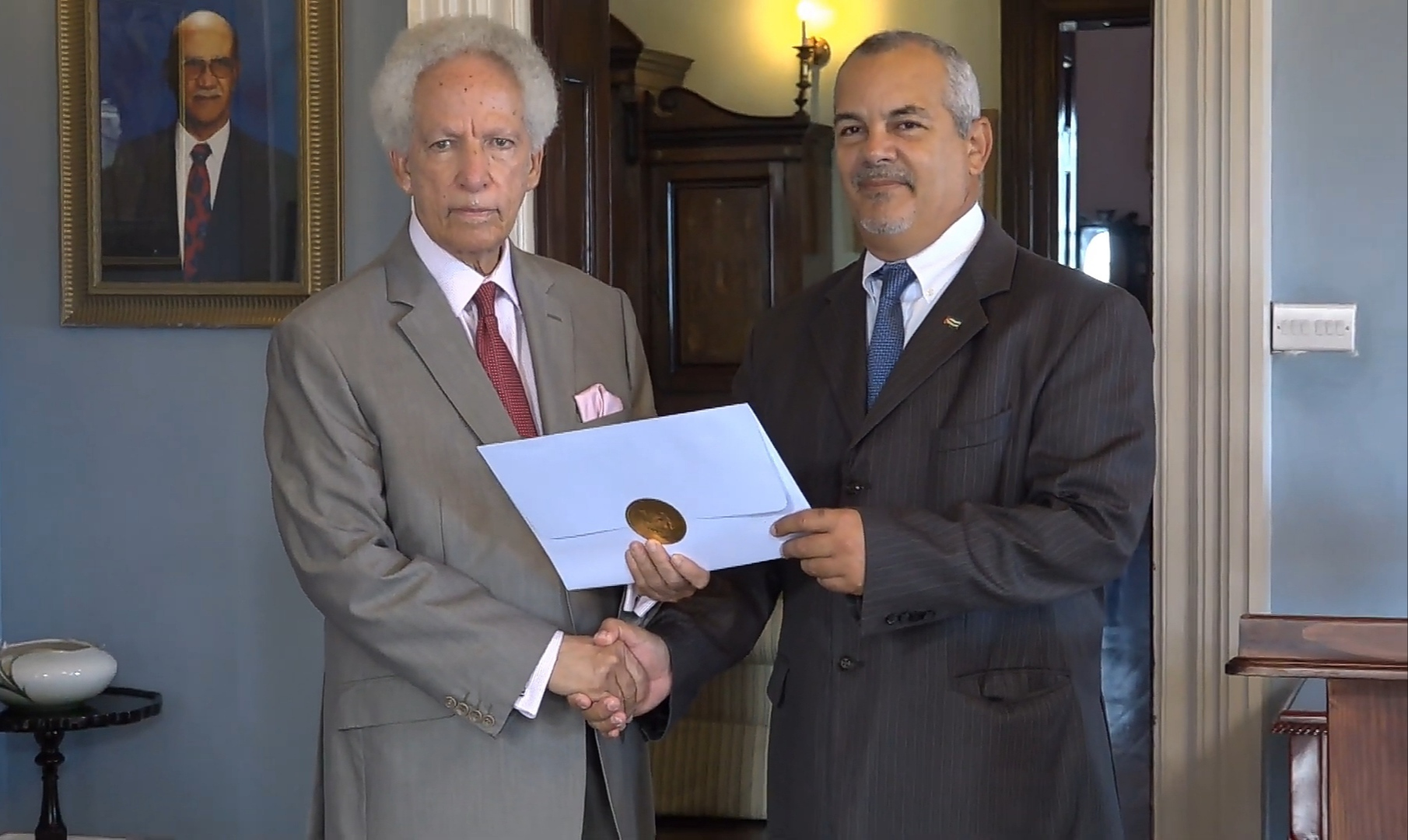
Governor-General Sir Neville Cenac receiving the credentials of Cuban ambassador Alejandro Simancas Marin, 2019

The governor-general's ceremonial duties include opening new sessions of parliament by delivering the Speech from the Throne, taking the salute during the Independence Day Parade, welcoming visiting heads of state, and receiving the credentials of foreign diplomats.

The governor-general also presents honours at investitures to Saint Lucians for notable service to the community, or for acts of bravery.

=== Community role ===
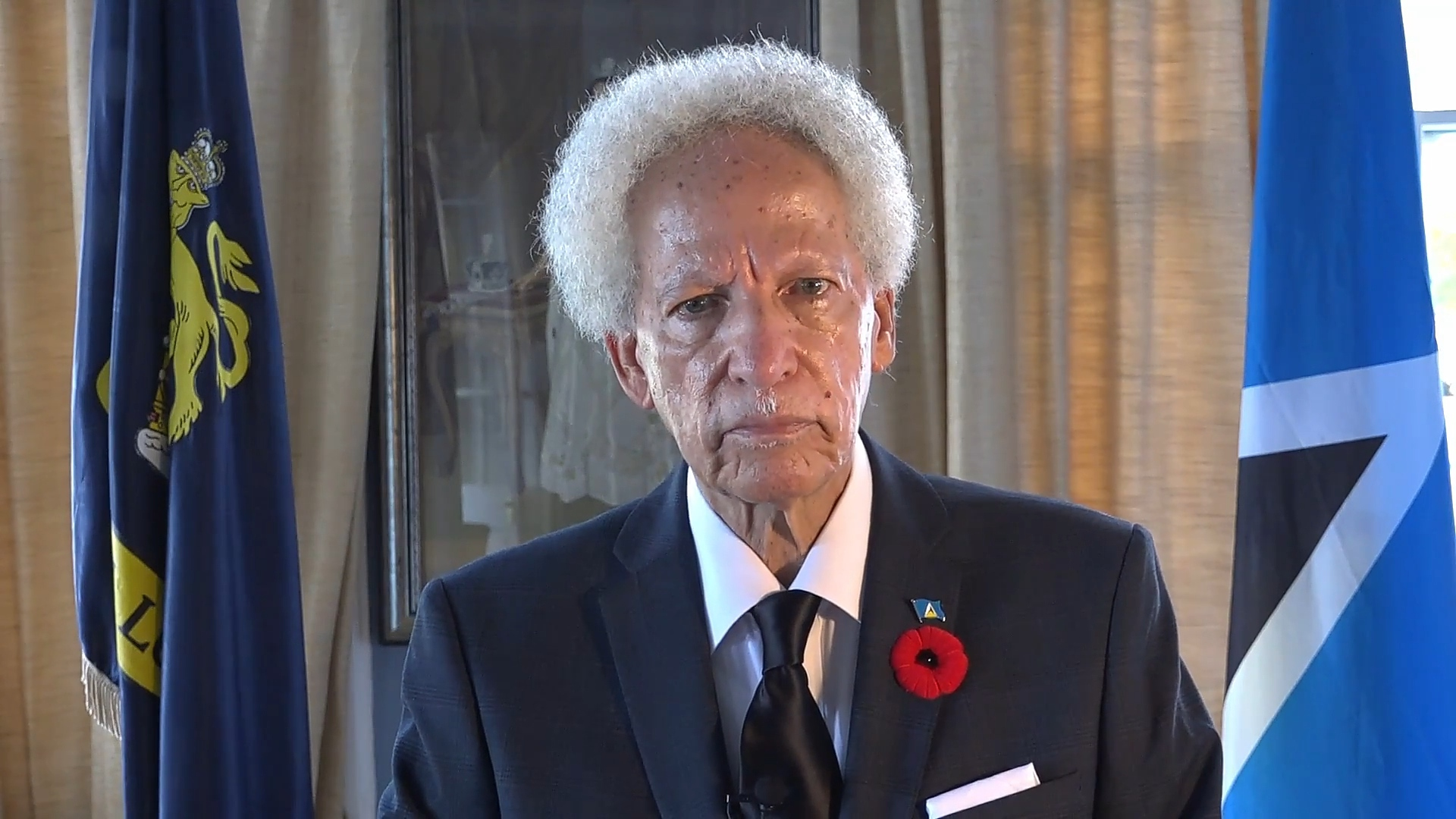
Governor-General Neville Cenac during his Remembrance Day address, 2018

The governor-general provides non-partisan leadership in the community, acting as patron of many charitable, service, sporting and cultural organisations, and attending functions throughout the country. The governor-general also encourages, articulates and represents those things that unite Saint Lucians together. In this role, the governor-general provides a focus for national identity, unity and pride by attending at events of national significance such as Independence Day activities and Remembrance Sunday.

The governor-general serves as patron of various organisations such as the Saint Lucia National Trust, the Girl Guides Association of Saint Lucia, Saint Lucia Red Cross, ad the Saint Lucia School of Music.

== Privileges ==
The governor-general, serves as the Chancellor of the Order of Saint Lucia, established by Queen Elizabeth II in 1986.

=== Salary ===
The governor-general receives an annual salary of US$36,112.

=== Symbols ===
Flag of the governor-general of Saint Lucia

The governor-general uses a personal flag, which features a lion passant atop a St. Edward's royal crown with "Saint Lucia" written on a scroll underneath, all on a blue background. It is flown on buildings and other locations in Saint Lucia to mark the governor-general's presence.

=== Residence ===
Government House in Castries is the official residence of the governor-general of Saint Lucia.

Dating back to 1895, it has served as the official residence and office of all governors-general since independence in 1979.

== List of governors-general ==
Following is a list of people who have served as governor-general of Saint Lucia since independence in 1979.

Denotes acting governors-general

No.	Portrait	Name (Birth–Death)	Term of office			Monarch (Reign)
No.	Portrait	Name (Birth–Death)	Took office	Left office	Time in office	Monarch (Reign)
1		Sir Allen Montgomery Lewis (1909–1993)	22 February 1979	19 June 1980	1 year, 118 days	Elizabeth II (1979–2022)
2		Boswell Williams (1926–2014)	19 June 1980	12 December 1982	2 years, 176 days	Elizabeth II (1979–2022)
(1)		Sir Allen Montgomery Lewis (1909–1993)	13 December 1982	30 April 1987	4 years, 138 days	Elizabeth II (1979–2022)
–		Vincent Floissac (1928–2010); Acting Governor-General	30 April 1987	10 October 1988	1 year, 163 days	Elizabeth II (1979–2022)
3		Sir Stanislaus A. James (1919–2011)	10 October 1988	1 June 1996	7 years, 235 days	Elizabeth II (1979–2022)
4		Sir George Mallet (1923–2010)	1 June 1996	17 September 1997	1 year, 108 days	Elizabeth II (1979–2022)
5		Dame Pearlette Louisy (b. 1946)	17 September 1997	31 December 2017	20 years, 105 days	Elizabeth II (1979–2022)
Vacant (1 – 12 January 2018)						Elizabeth II (1979–2022)
6		Sir Neville Cenac (1939–2026)	12 January 2018	31 October 2021	3 years, 292 days	Elizabeth II (1979–2022)
Vacant (31 October – 11 November 2021)						Elizabeth II (1979–2022)
–		Errol Charles (b. 1942); Acting Governor-General	11 November 2021	31 October 2024	2 years, 355 days	Elizabeth II (1979–2022)
–		Errol Charles (b. 1942); Acting Governor-General	11 November 2021	31 October 2024	2 years, 355 days	Charles III (2022–present)
7		Sir Errol Charles (b. 1942)	1 November 2024	31 July 2026	1 year, 272 days	Charles III (2022–present)
–		Felix Finisterre; Acting Governor-General	1 August 2026	Incumbent	37 days	Charles III (2022–present)

== See also ==
- List of prime ministers of Saint Lucia
- List of colonial governors and administrators of Saint Lucia
