= List of Caribbean folk music traditions =

This is a list of folk music traditions, with styles, dances, instruments and other related topics. The term folk music can not be easily defined in a precise manner; it is used with widely varying definitions depending on the author, intended audience and context within a work. Similarly, the term traditions in this context does not connote any strictly defined criteria. Music scholars, journalists, audiences, record industry individuals, politicians, nationalists and demagogues may often have occasion to address which fields of folk music are distinct traditions based along racial, geographic, linguistic, religious, tribal or ethnic lines, and all such peoples will likely use different criteria to decide what constitutes a "folk music tradition". This list uses the same general categories used by mainstream, primarily English-language, scholarly sources, as determined by relevant statements of fact and the internal structure of works.

These traditions may coincide entirely, partially or not at all with geographic, political, linguistic or cultural boundaries. Very few, if any, music scholars would claim that there are any folk music traditions that can be considered specific to a distinct group of people and with characteristics undiluted by contact with the music of other peoples; thus, the folk music traditions described herein overlap in varying degrees with each other.

The Caribbean music area includes all the islands of the Caribbean, including Cuba, Antigua and Barbuda, Montserrat, Saint Lucia, Virgin Islands, Puerto Rico, Dominican Republic, Haiti, Saint Kitts and Nevis, Saint Vincent and the Grenadines, Anguilla, Martinique, Dominica, Grenada, Guadeloupe and Trinidad and Tobago. In addition, the mainland South American countries of Guyana, Suriname and French Guiana are generally grouped with the Caribbean countries, as is the non-Caribbean island nation of the Bahamas. The island of Bermuda is not Caribbean, and its folk music is little studied; for convenience, it is included herein though it may or may not be typical of the Caribbean music area.

Country	Elements	Dance	Instrumentation	Other topics
Antiguan and Barbudan	benna - iron band	Highland fling - quadrille	banjar - bass drum - boompipe - kettle drum - toombah - triangle	Old Time Christmas Festival
Aruban	See Dutch Antillean	–	–	–
Bahamian	ant'em - goombay - junkanoo - rake-and-scrape - rhyming spiritual - ring-play - shape-note	quadrille - ring-dance - Heel-Toe-Polka	goombay - guitar - maraca - saw - banjo - accordion - Harmonica - cowbells - Trumpet	Obeah
Barbadian	tuk band	hornpipe - Jean and Johnnie - jig - march	banjo - bones - bow-fiddle - calabash - cymbal - guitar - pump - rook jaw - shak-shak - shukster - snare drum - triangle - tum tum	crop over - Landship - tea meeting
Bermuda	ballad	Gombey	bagpipe - fife - gombey - guitar - kettle drum - snare drum	
Bonaire	See Dutch Antillean	–	–	–
Carriacou	See Grenada	–	–	–
Cayman Islander	Christmas carol - serenade		accordion - drum - fiddle - grater - mouth organ	Batabano - Pirate's Week
Cuban	afro - - bembé - bolero - bunga - canción - chambelona - changüí - cierre - cinquillo - cocoyé - criolla - décima - diana - fragaya - guaracha - guajira - habanera - kiribá - lloraos - martillo - montuno - nengones - pregón - punto guajiro - repique - rumba - salamaleco - son - sucu-sucu - tonada - toque - tumbao	areito - bembé - chuchumbé - columbia - contradanza - danón - guaguancó - guaracha - makúa - makuta - maní - mañunga - masón - quadrille - rumba - sucu-sucu - tango congo - yambú - yuba - yuka - zapateo	aberikula - agogós - bandora - bandurria - batá - biankomé - bocú - bongo - bongó del monte - bonkoenchemiyá - botija - bulá - cajón - catá - cencerro - chachá - chaworó - chekere - cheré - claves - conga - cornetas chinas - ekwé - efí - efó - enú - güiro - guagua - guataca - guayo - guitar - ilú - itótele - judíos batá - junga - kinfuiti - kuchí-yeremá - laúd - maraca - marimbula - maruga - ngoma - nkembi - obí-apá - ogán - okónkolo - pailas - palito - quinto - segon - segundo - sese eribó - tingo talango - tiple - tres - tumba - tumbadore	abakuá - aché - arará - cabildo - Casa de la Trova - clave - comparsa - controversia - iremes - iyesá - ñáñigos - Palo - piquete - potencias - plantes - sandunga - Santería - toque - trovadore - tumba francesca
Curaçao	See Dutch Antillean	–	–	–
Dominica	bélé - caristo - chanté mas - jing ping - kont	bidjin (biguine) - flirtation - lancer - mazourk (mazurka) - mereng (merengue) - polka pil (pure polka) - quadrille - sotis (schottische) - vals o vyenn (Viennese waltz)	chakchak (maracas) - lapo kabwit (drums) - tanbou bélé - triangle (tingting)	lavèyé
Dominican Republic	bachata - gagá - jaleo - merengue - merengue típico cibaeño - perico ripiao	merengue	accordion - cuatro - güira - guayo - güiro - marimba - palo - tambora drum - vaksin	misterios - velacione
Dutch Antillean	belua - dan simadan - remailo - seú - tambú - tumba	bari - tambú - wapa	agan (iron or ploughshare) - bastèl (calabash) - chapi (hoe) - conga (drum) - guitar - kachu (cow's horn) - karko - quarta - tambú (drum) - triangle - wiri	Simadan
French Guianese	awassa - cassé-co - kawina - mato - songé - soussa	bigi poku		
Grenadan	cantique - chantey - lullaby - saraca	big drum - heel-and-toe polka - picquet - quadrille - reel	boula - cut drum	Carriacou nations - saraca - Tombstone Feast
Guadeloupe	gwo ka		boula - gwo ka - markeur (maké)	lewoz - masquerade - mizik vidé
Haitian	kongo - ibo - mereng - méringue - quintolet - ra-ra - ti - yanvalou	carabinier - chica - gragement - juba - menwat - méringue	big - boula - graj - guitar - kóné - lanbi - mamman - marimba - mosquito drum - ogan - segon - shekere - tambou - tcha-tcha - vaksin	bann rara - Haitian Carnival - majó jonk - Rada - Petwo - twoubadou - Vodou
Indo-Caribbean	bhajan - birha - chautal - dingolay - gali - matkor (matticore) - maulud - nirgun (funereal song) - qasida - sohar - tan - tassa	matkor (matticore)	dhantal - dholak - tabla - tassa	Mariamman theater - Hossay - pandit - phagwa - picong
Jamaican	baccra - burru - etu - gumbe - kumina - mento - nyabhingi - ring play - tambu	mento	banjo - bongo - fife - funde - guitar - kalimba	jonkonnu - grounation - Pocomania - Revival Zion
Kittitian and Nevisian	big drum - iron band	big drum	baha (blown metal pipe) - fife - guitar - quarto - shack-shack (tin can with beads inside) - triangle	tea meeting
Lucian	blòtjé - chanté abwè - chanté kont (jwé chanté) - chanté siay - gém - jwé - jwé dansé - Kélé drumming - kont - koutoumba - listwa - sankey - séwinal	bélè - comette - débòt (circle dance) - dézyèm fidji - faci - grande ronde (gwan won) - jwé pòté (circle dance) - koutoumba - kwadril (quadrille) - lakonmèt (mazurka, mazouk) - latwiyèm fidji (avantwa, lanmen dwèt) - manpa (maynan) - moulala - omans (waltz) - polka - pwémyé fidji - schottische - solo (couple dance) - yonbòt (circle dance)	baha (wooden trumpet) - banjo - bwa poye (skroud banjo) - chak-chak (rattle) - cuatro - fiddle - guitar - gwaj (scraper) - ka - mandolin - tambourine (tanbouwen) - tibwa - zo (bones)	chantwèl - Kélé - La Marguerite - La Rose - lang dévivé - wibòt
Martinican	biguine vidé - chouval bwa - groups à pied - gwo ka - ti bwa	bélè - biguine - manege	accordion - bélè - bell - clarinet - chacha (rattle) - flute - kazoo - tanbour - tanbou débonda - tibwa - trombone	lewoz - masquerade
Montserratian	jumbie	bam-chick-lay - country dance (goatskin, drum dance) - jumbie - polka - quadrille	accordion - babala (jumbie drum, tambourine) - bagpipe - boom pipe - fife (pulley) - French reel (skin drum, woowoo, jumbie drum) - gradge - shak-shak - triangle - cuatro (yokolee, ukulele)	obeah - rum shop
Puerto Rican	aguinaldo - bomba - copla (music) - danza - jíbaro - plena - requinto - seis - tipica	bomba	bomba - bongo - conga - cowbell - cuatro - güiro - maraca - pandereta - requinto - seguidora	controversia - parranda - trovador
Surinamese	aleko - badji - birha - bigi poku - kaseko - kawina - lonsei - matkor (matticore) - tan - Baithak Gana	kawina	dhantal - dholak - djas - hari kawina - koti kawina - kwatro - papai benta - rattle - skratji - timbal	ampuku - kumanti - obia pee - vodu - Winti
Trinidadian and Tobagonian	bamboula - bele - calypso - gayap - juba - lavway - parang - steelpan	calinda	bandolin - bo - cuatro - dhantal - dholak - omele - steelpan - tassa	calypso tent - camboulay - chantwell - Jamette - j'ouvert - picong - Shango - Trinidad and Tobago Carnival
Turks and Caicos	ripsaw		accordion - glass bottle - box guitar - musical saw - concertina - conch horn - conga drum - harmonica - maraca - mouth organ - triangle	
Vincentian	bele - Big Drum - string band	big drum - quadrille	Big Drum	chantwell - Vincy mas
Virgin Islander	bamboula - cariso - scratch (fungi) band - quelbe (quelbay)-iron bands- masquerade	jig - quadrille (Imperial Quadrille, Flat German Quadrille)-Bamboula	accordion - ass pipe - banjo - flute - drum (double-headed barrel) - gourd - guitar - squash - tambourine - ukulele - violin - washboard	David and Goliath - masquerade - tea meeting

== Sources ==
- Broughton, Simon (2000). Mark Ellingham (ed.). Rough Guide to World Music (First ed.). London: biggy. ISBN 1-85828-636-0.
- Lankford, Ronald D. Jr. (2005). The Changing Voice Music of Protest USA. New York: Schirmer Trade Books. ISBN 0-8256-7300-3.
- Philip V. Bohlman; Bruno Nettl; Charles Capwell; Thomas Turino; Isabel K. F. Wong (1997). Excursions in World Music (Second ed.). Prentice Hall. ISBN 0-13-230632-8.
- Garland Encyclopedia of World Music, Volume 2. Routledge. 1999. ISBN 0-8153-1865-0.
- Leymarie, Isabelle (2002). Cuban Fire: The Story of Salsa and Latin Jazz. London: Continuum. ISBN 0-8264-6566-8.
- Manuel, Peter (1988). Popular Musics of the Non-Western World. New York: Oxford University Press. ISBN 0-19-505342-7.
- Nettl, Bruno (1965). Folk and Traditional Music of the Western Continents. Englewood Cliffs, New Jersey: Prentice Hall.
- Fujie, Linda; James T. Koetting; David P. McAllester; David B. Reck; John M. Schechter; Mark Slobin; R. Anderson Sutton (1992). Jeff Todd Titan (ed.). Worlds of Music: An Introduction to the Music of the World's Peoples (Second ed.). New York: Schirmer Books. ISBN 0-02-872602-2.
- van der Merwe, Peter (1989). Origins of the Popular Style: The Antecedents of Twentieth-Century Popular Music. Oxford: Clarendon Press. ISBN 0-19-316121-4.
- "International Dance Glossary". World Music Central. Archived from the original on February 7, 2006.
