= List of Caribbean membranophones =

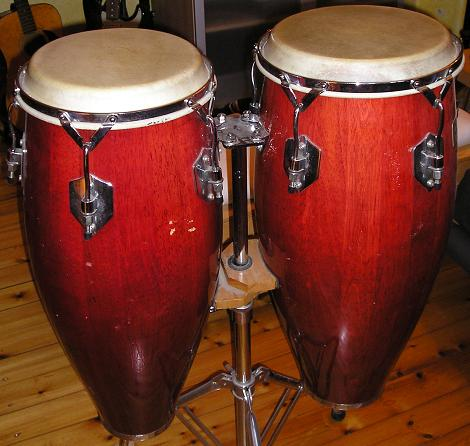
Conga drums are a common part of Caribbean music across much of the areas

This is a list of membranophones used in the Caribbean music area, including the islands of the Caribbean Sea, as well as the musics of Guyana, Suriname, French Guiana, Belize, Honduras, the coast of Guatemala and Bermuda. It only includes membranophones that are indigenous to the local music area or are a vital and long-standing part of local culture. It does not include membranophones that are, for example, a part of Western style orchestras, nor does it include trap sets and other common membranophones used in popular music recordings of many genres across the world. Almost all membranophones are drums and percussion instruments.

The Hornbostel-Sachs number is given after each instrument.

Instrument	Tradition	Hornbostel–Sachs classification	Description
agbe	See chekere	-	
agida	Suriname	211.212	Afro-Surinamese bass drum that sets a steady beat for folk music, played with a stick, of the set with apinti and tumao, pitch can be varied based on the location of the head struck, made from hollow logs with heads of skin, used in spiritual ceremonies, where it is associated with snake spirits
akete	See kété	-	
alcagüete	See alcahuete	-	
alcahuete alcagüete	Dominican Republic	211.211.2-7	One of the smaller drums used in the ensembles called palos, of the Afro-Dominican religious ceremonies, played either in pairs or trios, with single skin heads either pegged or tacked
amelé	See okónkolo	-	
apinti	Suriname	211.211.2	Principal Afro-Surinamese drum of the set with agida and tumao, tenor drum, decorated with carvings, and used for communication by Surinamese slaves and for religious purposes in connection with sky and ancestor spirits, pitch can be varied based on the location of the head struck, made from hollow logs with heads of skin
arobapá endóga	Cuba	211.21-814	Drum used in Afro-Cuban Abakuá societies, small enkomo drum of the biankomeko ensemble, along with the kuchiyeremá and biapá, and the taller bonkó enchemiyá
Assotor	Haiti	211.211.2	5-to-6-foot-tall (1.5 to 1.8 m) cylindrical drum with three windows near the base so the drummer (or pair of drummers) can play it easily, decorated with brightly colored kerchiefs (foulas)
atabales	See palos	-	
baboula	Grenada	211.221.1	Open-bottomed, goatskin-headed, made from barrels or tree trunks, smaller partner of the tambou, used in the belair dance
balaban jumbie drum	Montserrat	211.311	Small goatskin frame drum, played with the back of the hand, front of the fingers and the palm, used to attract spirits for the jumbie dance
balsié	Dominican Republic	2	Small double-headed drum, used in merengue only in the south of the country
bamboula	Virgin Islands	211.211.2	Played by two drummers, one using two sticks and the other hands and feet, used in dance genre of the same name (bamboula)
bandu	See kbandu	-	
bari	Bonaire and Curaçao	211.22	Single-headed, made from a wooden barrel, often from the herring industry, with a skin frame, played two-handed
barrel drum	Cuba	211.222.2-7	Barrel drum variant of a batá drum, often with the system of lacing replaced by nailing the heads to the drum, most common in Matanzas Province
barriles buleador, primo, repicador, subidor	Puerto Rico	211.221.2	Barrel drums, covered with lightly stretched skins, consists of large buleador drums and smaller subidor drums, used in bomba
bas a dé fas, tambou	Guadeloupe	211.212.2	Bass drum, double-headed, played with sticks, used in Carnival, specifically mizik a mas Byé Fò
bas a yon fas, tambou	Guadeloupe	211.221-7	Bass barrel drum, one-headed, laced, and played with sticks, used in Carnival, specifically mizik a mas a Sen Jan
bas, tambou di boula, tambou dibass, tambou dibas, tambou bas	Martinique and Guadeloupe	211.311	Small frame drum played with both striking and rubbing, used in indoor music, and quadrilles, ladja and gwo ka, and in the Tamil music of Indo-Caribbean Martinique
bas, tambou	See foulé, tambou	-	
bas, tambou	See bas, tambou di	-	
bas, tambou	See bas a yon fas, tambou	-	
base, tambou di	See bas, tambou di	-	
bass drum	Antigua and Barbuda	211.211.2	Bass drum, accompaniment to stilt dancers and Christmas music
bass drum	Barbados	211.212.1	Double-headed drum that keeps the ground rhythm and is slung across the drummers' shoulder, used in tuk bands
bass drum	Grenada	211.212.1	Double-headed bass drum, played with a hard stick in one hand for the lower head, and a soft mallet in the other hand for the upper head, used to accompany quadrilles
bass drum repeater (Maroon only)	Jamaica	211.212.1	Double-headed bass drum, carried with a strap and leader of marching bands, played with a covered stick in Nyabinghi ceremonies, used in marching bands, and Rastafarian and Maroon music
bass tumbadora true conga	Cuba	211.22.2	Largest barrel-shaped hand drum of the tumbadora family
basse	Haiti	211.311	Goatskin-headed tambourine, used in secular music
batá drums	Cuba	211.26-813	Family of three drums: iyá, itótele and okónkolo, used in Lucumi religious rites, all goblet-shaped and with two goatskin heads called tcha-tchás, sometimes with a nut inside (coco-Africano), both for aural and spiritual reasons
batta	Guyana	2	Afro-Guyanese bass drum, used in folk music traditions
baydum	Indo-Trinidadian	211.212.1	Double-headed bass drum, used in Muslim Hosay (Hosein) rituals, now widespread among Afro-Trinidadians and others
bélé	Martinique	211.251.2-91(+22)	Single-headed, open-bottomed conical drum with a hole in the barrel and a goatskin head, stretched by a rope hoop, wrapped in more rope, used in all African-derived Martinican dances and as a symbol of Afro-Martinican identity, including tambour bélé, kalenda, and danmyé, also used to synchronize collective labor in northern Martinique, and is a part of most Martinican rural work songs, uses a plucking string in the northern region
bélé, tambou	Dominica	211.221.2-86+22	Single-headed barrel drum, covered at one end by goatskin, stretched with rope and pegs, and played barehanded, accompanies bélé, features a plucked strings across the head
bélé, tambou	See ka	-	
bemba bembe	Trinidad and Tobago	211.212.2	Cylindrical drums with double skins, smallest of the set with conga and oumalay drums
bembe	See bemba	-	
bench drum	See gumbe	-	
biankomeko	Cuba	-	Afro-Cuban Abakuá drum ensemble, consisting of four drums: bonkó enchemiyá and enkomo: biapá, arobapá, and kuchiyeremá
biapá tétendóga	Cuba	211.21-814	Small enkomo drum of the biankomeko ensemble, along with the biapá, arobapá, and kuchiyeremá, and the taller bonkó enchemiyá
Big Drum	Saint Vincent and the Grenadines, Carriacou (Grenada) and Saint Kitts and Nevis	-	Music and dance ritual, which includes drums traditionally made of tree trunks, now often of rum kegs
bigi doon	See gaan doon	-	
biola	Cuba	211.321	Unstrung banjo with a drumhead attached
bomba	Puerto Rico	211.221.2	Barrel-shaped bass drum, used in genre of the same name (bomba)
bombos	Cuba	211.212.1	European-style bass drum, used in comparsa, a pre-Easter procession
boncó	See bonkó enchemiyá	-	
bongo	Cuba	211.211.1	Drums of unequal size played in a pair and held between the knees, originally used in Cuban folk music of various kinds, also used in music of Puerto Rico and across the area, especially Guyana
bonkó enchemiyá bonko enchemi, bonko, boncó	Cuba	211.21-814	Largest drum of the biankomeko ensemble, along with the enkomo: biapá, arobapá, and kuchiyeremá
bonko	See bonkó enchemiyá	-	
bonko enchemi	See bonkó enchemiyá	-	
boom	See kettle	-	
boom boom	See keg	-	
boula	Guadeloupe	211.221.2	Single-headed hand drum, similar to tambou bèlè and played transversally and single-handed, produces lower sounds and the basic rhythms of the music, used in gwo ka, Carnival, wrestling matches and wakes
boula tambou dibas, bulla, bula	Carriacou	211.221.2	Hand drum, formerly made of barrels, now more often rum casks; narrower and lower-tuned cousin of the kata, used in the Big Drum tradition, barrel contains a hole on the side, skin is stretched by a hoop wrapped in cloth
boula bula	Haiti	211.221.2-7	Cowskin hand drum, with the head pegged in place around a decorative collar, used in rada along with segon and manman drums
boula	Trinidad and Tobago	211.222-92	Double-headed barrel drum, played open handed, drum heads attached with hoops, accompanies kalenda stick fighting
bula	See boula (Carriacou, Haiti)	-	
bulla	See boula (Carriacou)	-	
buleador primo, repicador, burlador	Puerto Rico	211.221.2	Larger, barrel-shaped hand drums, covered with tight animal skin stretched using pegs, used in bomba
burlador	See buleador	-	
cachimbo	Cuba	211.211.2	Smallest yuka tubular drum, along with caja and mula
caja	Cuba	211.211.2	Largest yuka tubular drum, along with cachimbo and mula, played by two people, one striking the bass and the other hitting the body with a pair of sticks
cast	See playing cast	-	
chan, tambou	Guadeloupe	2	Small and high pitched drums, played with sticks, used in Carnival, specifically mizik a mas a Sen Jan
circular	See snare drum (Jamaica)	-	
conga tumbadora, tumba, requinto, quinto, ricardo, niño, supertumba, super quinto, tres golpes, salidor, true conga	Originally Cuban, now found throughout the Caribbean, especially Puerto Rico, Haiti and the Dominican Republic	211.221.1-7	Tall, narrow and single-headed barrel drum, open at the bottom, played by congueros, traditionally wood, now often fiberglass, animal-skin heads can be tuned; also used in popular genres from salsa to ripsaw
conga	See petwo	-	
conga	Trinidad and Tobago	211.212.2	Cylindrical drums with double skins, middle-sized drum of the set with bembe and oumalay drums; since introduced to Guyana
conga	Dominican Republic	211.212.2	Cylindrical folk drums
conguito	Dominican Republic	211.212.2	Cylindrical folk drums with a low bass tone, smaller version of the conga
cot	See kata	-	
cotchíerima	See kuchiyeremá	-	
cut drum	See kata	-	
cutter	Trinidad and Tobago	211.221-92	Single-headed barrel drum, played open handed, drum heads attached with hoops, accompanies kalenda stick fighting
cutter	See kata	-	
débonda, tambou doumbedoum	Guadeloupe and Martinique	211.222.1	Double-headed barrel drum, used in chouval bwa and Carnival music
dholak	Indo-Caribbean	211.212.1	Double-headed drum, used in chutney
dibas, tambou	See bas, tambou di	-	
dibass, tambou	See bas, tambou di	-	
djembe	Guadeloupe	211.261.2	Skin-covered hand drum, goblet-shaped and played bare-handed, used in gwo ka moderne
doumbedoum	See dèbonda, tambou	-	
dup	Grenada	211.221.2	Bass drum made from a cardboard barrel, used in parang
ekué ecue	Cuba	231.13-814	Single-headed three-legged friction drum used in Abakuá ceremonies, played by rubbing a stick over the membrane, which is attached using wedges whose tightness can be modified
enómo	See enkomo	-	
endóga	See arobapá	-	
enko	See enkomo	-	
enkomo enko, enómo	Cuba	211.21-814	Small cylindrical, or slightly tapered, goatskin-headed drums of the biankomeko ensemble, consisting of three types: biapá, arobapá, and kuchiyeremá
foulé, tambou	French Guiana	211.221.2-92	Large barrel drum, used in Creole instrumental ensembles and kaseko, plays a basic rhythm accompanied by the tambou koupé, head typically made of goatskin, attached with a vine or iron hoop
French drum	See hun	-	
French reel jumbie drum, woowoo	Montserrat	211.311	Goatskin frame drum, played with the back of the hand, front of the fingers and the palm, used to attract spirits for the jumbie dance
funde fundeh	Jamaica	211.211.1	Cylindrical drum, one-headed, held between players' legs and performed by tapping with the hand or fingers, originally used in Burru cult rituals, now also common in Nyabinghi ceremonies
funde	Guyana	211.21	Afro-Guyanese cylindrical drum
fundeh	See funde	-	
gaan doon	French Guiana	2	Large bass drum that leads dances, used by the Alukuó Maroons
ganbo	Haiti	211.211.1	Bamboo stomping tubes, sometimes played in groups
gombay	See gumbe	-	
gombey	Bermuda	211.211.2	Afro-Bermudan drum, related to the Bahamian goombay, used in the genre of the same name (gombey)
gonde	Haiti	211.251.2-7	Cowskin hand drum, played with a hand and a bow, in a set with katabo and tambou manman
goombah	See gumbe	-	
goombay	Bahamas and Turks and Caicos	211.211.2-7	Goatskin-headed drum traditionally made from improvised materials (especially discarded barrels), goatskin is tuned by heating it with a candle and attached with nails, used in the Bahamian genre of the same name (goombay)
goombay	See gumbe	-	
goombey	See gumbe	-	
gragé, tambou	French Guiana	211.3	Frame drum, used in Creole dance accompaniment for a dance of the same name (gragé)
groska	See gwo ka	-	
gumbay	See gumbe	-	
gumbe gumbay, goombeh, goombah, goombay, gombay, bench drum	French Guiana and Jamaica	211.31	Small Maroon-derived goatskin square-framed drum, introduced to Sierra Leone
gumbay	See gumbe	-	
gwo ka also used synonymously with ka	Guadeloupe	-	Family of hand drums, used in lewoz and other traditions, as well as zouk
harp	Jamaica	-	Generic term for drums used in ceremonies called grounations; these include the bass drum, funde and kété
hun French drums	Cuba	-	Family of four drums used in the Haitian-Cuban Arada ceremonies, consisting of hugán, xumpé, hun-hogúlo and huní
hugán French drum	Cuba	211.22-861	Largest of the four drums used in the Haitian-Cuban Arada ceremonies, along with xumpé, hun-hogúlo and huní
hun-hogúlo French drum	Cuba	211.22-861	Second-smallest of the four drums used in the Haitian-Cuban Arada ceremonies, along with hugán, xumpé and huní
huní French drum	Cuba	211.22-861	Smallest of the four drums used in the Haitian-Cuban Arada ceremonies, along with hugán, xumpé and hun-hogúlo
ich, tambou	Saint Lucia	2	Smaller drum used in Kélé rituals, literally child drum
ikónkolo	See okónkolo	-	
itótele	Cuba	211.26-813	Intermediate-sized batá goblet-shaped drum, made of wood and covered with skin, along with the iyá and okónkolo; wax-like substance called ida or fardela sometimes used to produce a duller sound
iyá	Cuba	211.26-813	Largest batá goblet-shaped drum, made of wood and covered with goatskin, along with the itótele and okónkolo; red wax-like substance called ida or fardela is used to produce a duller sound, wrapped with bells and belts (chaguoro or tchaworo)
juba martinique	Haiti	211.21-92	Shorter and squatter variety of petwo
jumbie drum	See French reel, balaban	-	
ka also used synonymously with gwo ka	Guadeloupe and Martinique	211.221	Single-headed drums, used in Carnival, specifically mizik a mas a Kongo, made from a barrel with goatskin heads tighted by cord
ka	Saint Lucia	211.221	Barrel drum with a goatskin head, used in various folk forms, including chanté siay, jwé dansé and jwé gém
ka	See tambou	-	
kanmougé, tambou	French Guiana	211.211.1	Open-bottomed and single-headed drum, played transversally and carved from a single fragment of wood, used in Creole dance accompaniment for kanmougé and mayouri dances, played in pairs with the lead called the "female" type and the support the "male"
kata cut drum, cutter, cot	Carriacou	211.211.2	Hand drum, formerly made of barrels, now more often rum casks; wider and higher-tuned cousin of the boula, used in the Big Drum tradition, barrel contains a hole on the side, skin is stretched by a hoop wrapped in cloth
katabo	Haiti	211.251.2-7	Cowskin hand drum, played with two sticks, in a set with gonde and tambou manman
kbandu bandu	Jamaica	211.211.1+111.231	Large, low-pitched, plays a 4/4 rhythm, covered with a goat skin, used in Kumina ceremonies, where it plays a steady rhythm, and is often used several at a time, open end sometimes banged with sticks
keg boom boom	Virgin Islands	211.212.1	Double-headed bass drum, used in masquerades and fife and drum ensembles
kété akete	Jamaica	211.21	Small skinny cylindrical drum, improvised, used in Nyabinghi celebrations, played with bare hands, also used in dub poetry
kettle boom	Montserrat	211.221	Goatskin deep-barreled drum, used in Carnival and other celebrations
kettle drum	Antigua and Barbuda	211.11	Kettle drum, accompaniment to stilt dancers and Christmas music
kettle drum	Bermuda	211.11	Central use in Bermudan traditions, derived from British kettle drum, especially common in gombey
kettle drum	Virgin Islands	211.11	Snare drum, used in fife and drum ensembles
Kimbisa drum	Cuba	211–864	Tall drum with goatskin head, held in place by cords, wedges and hoops, used in the Kimbisa culture
kinfuiti	Cuba	231.12	Friction drum, single-headed, with a stick inserted and rubbed to produce the sound, used in the Kimbisa tradition
kittle boom	Guyana	211.11	Kettle drum, used in masquerades
koupé, tambou	French Guiana	211.221.2-92	Small barrel drum, used in Creole instrumental ensembles and kaseko, used to improvise for dancing while the tambou foulé plays a basic rhythm, head typically made of goatskin, attached with a vine or iron hoop
kromanti	Jamaica	211.21	Cylindrical drum, used by the Maroons of Moore Town
kuchiyeremá cotchíerima	Cuba	211.21-814	Small enkomo drum of the biankomeko ensemble, along with the arobapá and biapá, and the taller bonkó enchemiyá
lapo kabwit	Dominica	-	Any kind of Dominican or Grenadan folk drum
lélé, tambou	Dominica	211.211.2	Cylindrical drum, small and wooden with goatskin at one end, strapped across the shoulder and played with two sticks, used in chanté mas
loango loangue	Haiti	211.21-92	Taller and narrower variety of petwo
loangue	See loango	-	
maké	See markeur	-	
makuta	See yuka	-	
makyé	See markeur	-	
manman, tambou	Saint Lucia	2	Larger drum used in Kélé rituals, literally mother drum
mamnan, tambou	Haiti	211.251.2-7	Hand drum with a cowhide head, pegged in place and with a decorated collar, used in many Afro-Haitian musics, used in rada, petwo and other folk traditions
marassas	Haiti	211.212.2	Cylindrical drum that comes in pairs, traditionally made from wood or a two-gallon container with both top and bottom removed and replaced with heads, played with fingers
markeur makyé, marqueur, maké	Guadeloupe	211.221.2	Single-headed hand drum, small, high-pitched, played upright and one-handed, and held between the legs, interacts with dancers by responding to movement and improvises with the boula drum, used in gwo ka, Carnival, wrestling matches and wakes
marqueur	See markeur	-	
martinique	See juba	-	
matrimonial	See wacharaca	-	
mongó	Dominican Republic	211.3	Small rural folk handheld frame drum
moyen	See segon	-	
mula	Cuba	211.211.2	Intermediate-sized yuka tubular drum, along with caja and cachimbo
ngoma	See yuka	-	
niño	Cuba	2	Smallest drum of the conga family
Nyabinghi	See kété	-	
okónkolo ikónkolo, amelé	Cuba	211.26-813	Smallest batá goblet-shaped drum, made of wood and covered with skin, along with the itótele and iyá
oumalay	Trinidad and Tobago	211.212.2	Cylindrical drums with double skins, middle-sized drum of the set with bembe and conga drums
omele	See oumalay	-	
pailas	Dominican Republic	211.12	Kettledrum, played in pairs, made from containers used to boil sugarcane juice, with tension lugs to adjust the tightness of the single-head, closed bottom
palo auxiliar	Dominican Republic	211.211.2-7	One of the smaller drums used in the ensembles called palos, of the Afro-Dominican religious ceremonies, played either in pairs or trios, with single skin heads either pegged or tacked
palo major	Dominican Republic	211.211.2-7	Larger folk long drum made from a tree trunk, used singly in ensembles called palos, of the Afro-Dominican religious ceremonies, played either in pairs or trios, with single skin heads either pegged or tacked
palo menor	Dominican Republic	211.211.2-7	Smaller folk long drum made from a tree trunk, used singly in ensembles called palos, of the Afro-Dominican religious ceremonies, played either in pairs or trios, with single skin heads either pegged or tacked
palos atabale	Dominican Republic	211.211.2-7	Ensembles that include a number of drums, include the types of palo and alcahuete, used in the Afro-Dominican religious ceremonies, played either in pairs or trios, with skin heads either pegged or tacked
pandereta pandero	Puerto Rico	211.3	Handheld frame drum, used in plena, adapted from European tambourine
pandero	See pandereta	-	
panderos	Dominican Republic	211.3	Small rural folk handheld frame drum
Pétro	See petwo	-	
petwo conga, Pétro	Haiti	211.21-92	Cylindrical drum headed with cowskin, attached with cords, comes in two varieties: loango and juba
pikin doon	French Guiana	2	Medium-sized drum that supports dancers, played in pairs, with one played solo, and both played bare-handed, used among the Alukuó Maroons
playing cast playin kya, cast	Jamaica	211.211.1+111.231	Small, high-pitched, plays complex, syncopated rhythms, covered with a goat skin, used in Kumina, open end sometimes struck with sticks
playin kya	See playing cast	-	
podya	Suriname	2	Small, skin-covered bass drum, common among the rural Afro-Surinamese
prenting	See kromanti	-	
primo	See subidor	-	
pump	Barbados	2	Long drum, made from a hollow tree trunk with goat or sheep skin on either end
pump	St Maarten	211.31	Goatskin frame drum, sometimes played in pairs or larger groups, usually using both hands
quinto	Cuba	211.221	Smallest barrel-shaped hand drum, made out of a box with two sloping sides, of the tumbadora family, plays the most intricate rhythms of the group, not always characterized as a tumbadora or conga drum
rada	Haiti	2	Drum headed with cowskin, attached with wooden pegs
ralé	Haiti	2	Goatskin drum, used alongside tambou manman, used in petwo and YaYa TiKongo rhythms
rattle	See snare drum (Jamaica)	-	
repeater	See bass drum (Jamaica), snare drum (Jamaica)	-	
repeater	See kété	-	
repeater	Jamaica	2	Used in the Burru rituals, now imported to Rastafarian music
repicador	See subidor	-	
requinto drum	Puerto Rico	211.25	Small conical hand drum, improvises over the other drum rhythms, used in plena
ricardo	See conga	-	
ripsaw drum	Turks and Caicos and Bahamas (Cat Island only)	2	Goat- or cow-skin drum, heated to produce a pitch
round	See snare drum (Jamaica)	-	
Saba drum	Saba	211.22	Made from kegs or barrels, and attached to a skin frame secured by wood, rope and pegs
salidor	See conga	-	
scratch band barrel drum	Virgin Islands	211.222	Double-headed barrel drum, used in scratch bands
second	See segon	-	
segon	Haiti	211-7	Cowskin hand drum with artistic collars, used in rada along with boula and manman drums
segundo	See conga	-	
side drum	See snare drum	-	
skratji	Suriname	2	Large Afro-Surinamese bass drum with a cymbal on top, used in kaseko
snare drum	Bermuda	211.212.1	Central use in Bermudan traditions, generally played in pairs, used in gombey
snare drum kettle	Barbados	211.212.1	Doubled headed side snare drum, used in tuk bands
snare drum	Cuba	211.212.1	Snare drum used in comparsa pre-Easter celebrations
snare drum side drum, Maroon only: repeater, rattle, round, circular	Jamaica	211.212.1	Snare drum played with wooden sticks, carried with a strap, used in marching bands and Maroon music
snare drum	Suriname	211.212.1	Snare drum, used in kaseko
stave drum	Cuba	211.261.2-813	Drum with straight but sloping sides, closest to being a classic goblet drum, variation on a batá drum
subidor primo, repicador	Puerto Rico	211.22	Smaller, barrel-shaped hand drums, covered with tight animal skin, used in bomba
super quinto	See conga	-	
supertumba	See conga	-	
tambora	Dominican Republic originally, now also common on St Maarten	211.222	Double-headed barrel drum of African origin, played with a stick on one head and a bare hand on the other
tambou	Grenada and Dominica	211.221.1	Open-bottomed, goatskin-headed, made from barrels or tree trunks, larger partner of the baboula, accompanies the belair dance
tambou	Martinique and Guadeloupe	-	Generic term for drums
tambour	Puerto Rico	211.211.2	Long drum, made from a hollowed-out tree trunk and topped with animal skin
tambourine	Haiti	212.211	Miniature version of the tymbale, beaten with two sticks
tambú tambu	Curaçao	211.211.2	Long drum, made from a hollow log, used in tambú
tanbou	See tambou	-	
tanbou	Haiti		Barrel drum made from hardwood and topped with animal skin
tassa	Indo-Trinidadian, now commonplace	211.11	Kettle drum with a goatskin head, used in the Muslim Hosay (Hosein) ritual
tenbal, tambou	Saint Lucia	211.212.1	Snare drum, used in cockfights, séwinal, merry-go-rounds, other celebrations
tenor drum	Jamaica	2	Carried with a strap, used in marching bands
tétendóga	See biapá	-	
timbales tymbales	Cuba	211.211.1	European-derived open-bottomed twin drum, played using sticks
tom	Guadeloupe	211.212.1	Cylindrical drum like the tom-tom drum, [played with sticks
tombas	Guadeloupe	211.212.1	Bass drum, played with sticks
toombah tumtum	Antigua and Barbuda	2	Small drum, decorated with shells and tin
tres golpes	See conga	-	
tres por dos	Cuba	211.22	Medium-sized barrel-shaped hand drum of the tumbadora family
true conga	See bass tumbadora	-	
tumba	Cuba	211.221-7	Largest variety of the conga family, stave drum with a cowskin head
tumbadora bass tumbadora, true conga, tres por dos, quinto	Cuba	211.22.2	Cuban conga drum, barrel-shaped hand drum
tumao	Suriname	211.211.2	Intermediate drum of the set, with agida and apinti, played with one hand, pitch can be varied based on the location of the head struck, made from hollow logs with heads of skin
tumtum	See toombah	-	
tumtum	Barbados	211.212.1	Hollowed-out tree trunk with skins at either end
tun	French Guiana	2	Small drum, used among the Alukuó Maroons
twavay, tambou	Dominica	22	Small barrel frame drum, headed with goatskin; a cord with an attached bead is placed on the drumskin to add a buzzing quality to the sound, used to accompany work songs
tymbale	Haiti	212.212.1	Large two-headed hooped drum, carried with a strap and sometimes with an attached board called an assot
tymbales	See timbales	-	
uyó	Cuba	23	Abakua friction drum, details of construction are kept secret
woowoo	See French reel	-	
xumpé French drum	Cuba	211.22-861	Second-largest of the four drums used in the Haitian-Cuban Arada ceremonies, along with hugán, hun-hogúlo and huní
yuka makuta, ngoma, tambor de yuka	Cuba	211.211.2	Class of three folk tubular drums: caja, mula, and cachimbo
zesse	Haiti	22	Cylindrical drum used in the dance of the same name, has a wire stretched across the single goatskin head
