= Music of the Americas =

The music of the Americas, or Pan-American music, is very diverse since, in addition to the many types of indigenous music of the Americas, the music of Europe and the music of Africa have been found there for some five centuries, creating many hybrid forms that have influenced the popular music of the world.

== Music by country ==
- Music of North America
  - Music of Canada
  - Music of Mexico
  - Music of the United States
- Music of Central America
  - Music of Belize
  - Music of Costa Rica
  - Music of El Salvador
  - Music of Guatemala
  - Music of Honduras
  - Music of Nicaragua
  - Music of Panama
- Music of the Caribbean
  - Music of Antigua and Barbuda
  - Music of the Bahamas
  - Music of Barbados
  - Music of Cuba
  - Music of Dominica
  - Music of the Dominican Republic
  - Music of Grenada
  - Music of Haiti
  - Music of Jamaica
  - Music of Saint Kitts and Nevis
  - Music of Saint Lucia
  - Music of Saint Vincent and the Grenadines
  - Music of Trinidad and Tobago
- Music of South America
  - Music of Argentina
  - Music of Bolivia
  - Music of Brazil
  - Music of Chile
  - Music of Colombia
  - Music of Ecuador
  - Music of Guyana
  - Music of Paraguay
  - Music of Peru
  - Music of Suriname
  - Music of Uruguay
  - Music of Venezuela

== See also ==
- List of cultural and regional genres of music
- Latin music
- Caribbean music
