= List of musical genres of the African diaspora =

- African American music

- Acid House
- Bluegrass
- Blues
- Blues Rock
- Bounce Music
- Breakbeat
- Chicago Blues
- Chicago House
- Country
- Deep House
- Delta Blues
- Detroit Blues
- Detroit Techno
- Contemporary R&B
- Disco
- Doo-wop
- Electric Blues
- Electro
- Funk
- Garage
- Go-go
- Gospel music
- Hardcore punk
- Hard Rock
- Heavy Metal
- Hip Hop
- Hip House
- House
- Jazz
- Metalcore
- Memphis Blues
- Minimal Techno
- Neo Soul
- New Orleans Blues
- Punk rock
- Ragtime
- Rap
- Rhythm & Blues
- Rock
- Rock & Roll
- Rockabilly
- Soul
- Spirituals
- Swing
- Techno
- Texas Blues
- Zydeco

- Arabic music

- Adhan
- Anasheed
- Liwa
- Fann at-Tanbura
- Middle-Eastern & North African
- Mizmar
- Gnawa

- Brazilian music

- Afoxé
- Axé Music
- Capoeira
- Maracatu
- Samba
- Samba-Reggae
- Funk Carioca

- British Black music

- 2 Tone
- 2-Step Garage
- Afroswing
- Blues
- Caribbean
- Disco
- Drum & Bass
- Dubstep
- Eurodance
- Eurodisco
- Garage
- Grime
- British Hip hop
- Hip House
- Oldschool Jungle
- Ragga Jungle
- Rhythm & Blues
- Soul
- Speed Garage

- Cape Verdean music (see page for full list of musical forms)

- Morna

- Colombian music (see page for full list of musical forms)
- Cuban music (see page for full list of musical forms)

- Afro (genre)
- Son

- Music of the Dominican Republic (see page for full list of musical forms)
  - Bachata
  - Merengue
- Music of Ecuador

- Bambuco
- Bomba (Ecuador)

- France

- Afro trap
- French hip hop
- Raï

- Garifuna music

- Music of Belize
- Music of Honduras
- Hunguhungu

- Haitian music (see page for full list of musical forms)
- Jamaica

- Dancehall
- Dub
- Lovers rock
- Mento
- Ragga
- Reggae
- Rocksteady
- Roots reggae
- Ska

- Music of the Lesser Antilles

- Zouk
- Music of Anguilla
- Music of Antigua and Barbuda
- Music of Aruba and the Netherlands Antilles
- Music of Barbados

- Spouge

- Music of Grenada
- Music of Montserrat
- Music of Saint Kitts and Nevis
- Music of Saint Vincent and the Grenadines
- Music of Trinidad and Tobago

- Calypso music

- Music of the Virgin Islands

- Music of French Guiana

- Kasékò

- Peru

- Landó
- Festejo
- Cueca

- Puerto Rico

- Bomba
- Plena
- Reggaeton

- Uruguay and Argentina

- Candombe

- Siddi music

- Dhamal dance

== See also ==
- Music of the African diaspora
  - Afro-Caribbean music
- Music of Africa
  - Middle Eastern and North African music traditions
  - Music of West Africa
  - Sub-Saharan African music traditions
