= Music of the African diaspora =

Musical traditions of the African diaspora

Music of the African diaspora is a sound created, produced, or inspired by Black people, including African music traditions and African popular music as well as the music genres of the African diaspora, including some Caribbean music, Latin music, Brazilian music and African-American music.

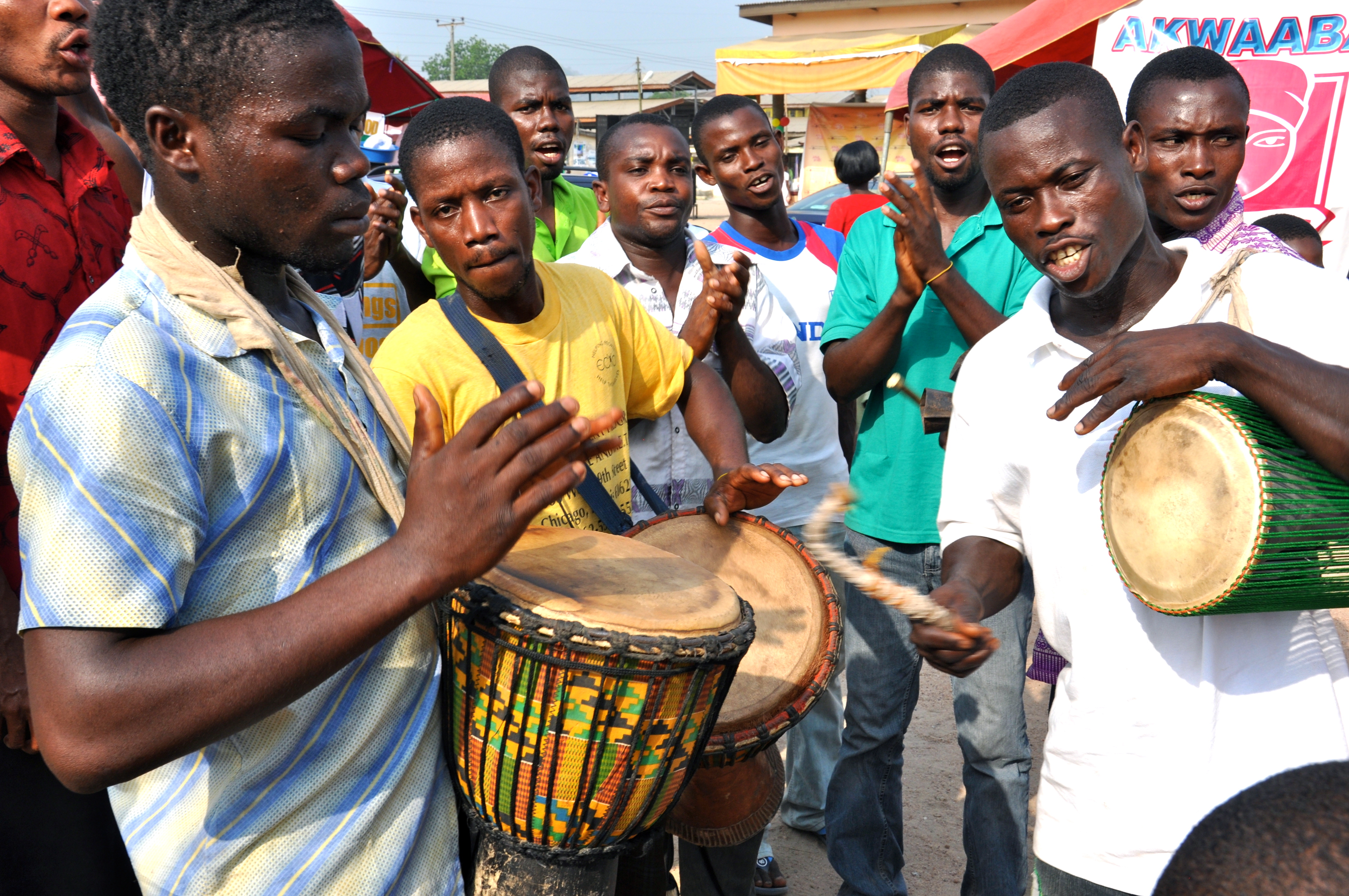
African Men play drums at a health fair in Ghana. (USAID/Kasia McCormick) 2012

Music of the African diaspora was mostly refined and developed during the period of slavery. Slaves did not have easy access to instruments, so vocal work took on new significance. Through chants and work songs people of African descent preserved elements of their African heritage while inventing new genres of music. The culmination of this great sublimation of musical energy into vocal work can be seen in genres as disparate as gospel music and hip-hop. The music of the African diaspora makes frequent use of ostinato, a motif or phrase which is persistently repeated at the same pitch. The repeating idea may be a rhythmic pattern, part of a tune, or a complete melody. The banjo is a direct descendant of the akonting created by the Jola people, found in Senegal, Gambia and Guinea-Bissau in West Africa. Hence, the melodic traditions of the African diaspora are probably most alive in blues and jazz.

== Background ==
Many genres of music originate from communities that have visible roots in Africa. In North America, it was a way that the early slaves could express themselves and communicate when they were being forcibly relocated and when there were restrictions on what cultural activities they could pursue. The sorrows of song were the only freedom slaves had working on cotton fields, and overall through labor tactics. This burden of slavery became a gateway for other genres of music such as the blues. For example, Black music does not just encompass sounds of the U.S. black experience but also a global black experience that stretches from Africa to Americas.

The term for many coming from places of "Black" origin can be perceived in a derogatory manner by cultures who see the term as a blurring of lines which ignores the true roots of certain peoples and their specific traditions. To refer to musical genres with strong African-American influence, such as hip hop music, is very limited in scope and is not adopted by academic institutions as a true category of music. The individual aspects and collectively of black music is surrounded by the culture in itself as well as experience. Black music is centered around a story and origin. Many artists sing about the things they have experienced firsthand. Music was a tool black people used to communicate and express themselves during hard times such as slavery. Their songs were used to give guidance to one another and tell stories. The varieties of sounds and expressions used in the music helped stress their emotions.

Black music began to reflect urban environments through amplified sounds, social concerns, and cultural pride expressed through music. It combined blues, jazz, boogie-woogie and gospel, taking the form of fast-paced dance music with highly energized guitar work appealing to young audiences across racial divides.

== Genres ==
Genres include spiritual, gospel, rumba, blues, bomba, country, rock and roll, rock, jazz, pop, salsa, R&B, samba, calypso, soca, soul, disco, kwaito, funk, ska, reggae, dub reggae, house, Detroit techno, amapiano, hip hop, gqom, afrobeat, bluegrass, and others.

== Middle East ==
- Liwa (music) and Fann at-Tanbura, performed in Arab states of the Persian Gulf. Mizmar (dance) is performed in the Hejaz and Tihamah regions of Saudi Arabia.

== Caribbean ==
=== Cuba and Latin music in the Caribbean ===
The roots of most Cuban music forms lie in the cabildos, a form of social club among African slaves brought to the island. Traditional Afro-Cuban styles, include son, Batá and yuka and Rumba. The Cuban contradanza, which became also known as the Habanera, the first written music to be rhythmically based on an African rhythm pattern, gained international fame in the 19th century. The habanera "El Arreglito" composed by the Spanish musician Sebastian Yradier, was adapted to become one of the most famous arias in Georges Bizet's 1875 opera Carmen, "L'amour est un oiseau rebelled".

=== Dominican Republic ===
Bachata is a popular guitar music that originated in the Dominican Republic. Having strong African and Spanish influences it is therefore also considered to be music of Latin America. The subjects of bachata are often romantic with tales of heartbreak and sadness. The original term used to name the genre was amargue ("bitterness", "bitter music", or "blues music"), until the more neutral term bachata became popular. The Dominican Republic gave birth to merengue in the 19th century, and it quickly became a vital component of that nation's musical culture. Melegue is a fast-paced 2/4 beat that combines bass guitar, accordion, guira (a metal scraper), and tambora (a two-sided drum). Couples grasp each other tightly and move their hips and feet in time with the fast-paced music throughout the energetic dance. Similar to bachata, merengue was originally connected to the lower classes but rose to national popularity in the 20th century and has subsequently expanded globally.

=== Haiti and Francophone music in the Caribbean ===
Haitian music is familiar to people in the English-speaking world as Méringue. It developed during the early decades of the 19th century. When jazz became popular worldwide, mini-jazz (mini-djaz in Haitian Creole) was created as Haiti's local variety. Kadans, Haitian Creole for cadence, followed the mini-jazz era. Kadans had an influence on the development of Zouk in the French-speaking Antilles of the Caribbean. Haiti's most well-known modern music genre is compas music. It was first popularized in the 1950s by Nemours Jean-Baptiste.

==== Zouk music ====
Zouk is a style of music originating in Guadeloupe and Martinique during the 1980s. It has many influences, from Haitian, calypso, beguine and compas. Beyond its roots in the Caribbean, zouk has become more popular throughout the French-speaking world, especially in France, Quebec, and Francophone Africa, where regional varieties of the genre have emerged. African nations such as Cape Verde, Senegal, and the Ivory Coast have seen the fusion of zouk with indigenous music genres to create new hybrid styles such as Afro-funk.

The conventional zouk sound has a slow tempo, and it is sung in Antillean Creole, although it also has varieties that have developed in francophone Africa. It is popular throughout the French-speaking world, including France and Quebec.

=== Former British West Indies and the Lesser Antilles ===
==== Jamaica ====
Early forms of Afro-Caribbean music in Jamaica was Junkanoo (a type of folk music now more closely associated with The Bahamas). Mento is a style of Jamaican music that predates and has greatly influenced ska, which was also fused with African traditions, American jazz and blues. Subsequent styles besides ska include, rocksteady and raggamuffin. (Mical 1995) Along with the rise of ska came the popularity of deejays who began talking stylistically over the rhythms of popular songs at sound systems, known as toasting. This would later give birth to dancehall and pioneer rapping that later emerged in New York. Reggae stems from early ska and rocksteady, but also has its own style of Jamaican authenticity.

In Jamaica, African diasporic music is made to portray resistance through music in order to strengthen the communal bond and identity for groups that share collective memories of oppression, suffering, etc.

==== Lesser Antilles ====
As is the case throughout the Caribbean, Lesser Antillean musical cultures are largely based on the music of African slaves brought by European traders and colonizers. The African musical elements are a hybrid of instruments and styles from numerous West African tribes, while the European slaveholders added their own music into the mix, as did immigrants from India. In addition to African and European influences, East Indian immigrants, who were brought to the Caribbean as indentured laborers after the abolition of slavery, also contributed to the region's musical diversity. East Indian musical traditions, particularly those rooted in Hindu devotional music and folk forms like chutney, further enriched the evolving musical culture of the Lesser Antilles.

==== Trinidad and Tobago ====
In Trinidad and Tobago, whose calypso style is an especially potent part of the music of the other former British colonies, which also share traditions like the Big Drum dance. Trinidadian folk calypso is found throughout the area, as are African-Caribbean religious music styles like the Shango music of Trinidad. Calypso's early rise was closely connected with the adoption of Carnival by Trinidadian slaves, including camboulay drumming and the music masquerade processions. In the 1970s, a calypso variant called soca arose, characterized by a focus on dance rhythms rather than lyricism. Soca has since spread across the Caribbean and abroad.

Steel drums are a distinctively Trinidadian ensemble that evolved from improvised percussion instruments used in Carnival processions. Steel bands were banned by the British colonial authorities. Nevertheless, steel drums spread across the Caribbean, and are now an entrenched part of the culture of Trinidad and Tobago.

==== French Caribbean islands and others ====
The French islands of Martinique and Guadeloupe share the popular zouk style and have also had extensive musical contact with the music of Haiti, itself once a French colony though not part of the Lesser Antilles. The Dutch colonies of Curaçao, Bonaire and Aruba share the combined rhythm popular style. The islands also share a passion for kaseko, a genre of Surinamese music; Suriname and its neighbors Guyana and French Guiana share folk and popular styles that are connected enough to the Antilles and other Caribbean islands that both countries are studied in the broader context of Antillean or Caribbean music.

== Oceania ==
=== Australia ===
Starting from the second half of the 19th century, African American performance through the colonial type of blackface entertainment gained popularity in Australia.

=== Melanesia ===
The use of funk, hip hop, and reggae in Papua New Guinea is a phenomenon that occurred post-1970s, however the racial identifications expressed within said phenomenon originate from the mid 20th century during World War II. American presence in the Second World War brought African-American and West Indian soldiers into contact with Melanesian and Aboriginal indigenous groups. Aboriginal peoples and Torres Strait Islanders were able to identify with the American and West Indian servicemen due to the similarities of their physical appearance, most notably their darker skin color, and consequently shared dances and songs with them. The so-called Black Pacific, i.e. the cultural contact of African and Melanesian people, was fostered mainly through the Melanesian négritude that became the focal point of cultural communication, including music and the arts. Popular music bands with an evident anti-colonial, Black Power identity were the Black Brothers, a rock-reggae band from West Papua in 1970s, and the Black Sweet, a Melanesian band in the 1980s.

== Early United States ==
When Africans came to the United States they brought their music with them. Over time, a new genre of music developed, called spirituals. Spirituals were the songs that the enslaved Africans began to sing, and they were sung by the enslaved Africans often, including while working, in prayer meetings, and in Black churches. They helped the enslaved Africans cope with slavery. They were composed by the community and the genre came out of the enslaved African experience.

Spirituals developed because the enslaved African's masters forced Christianity onto them. Through Christianity, the enslaved Africans learned many hymns. Eventually, the hymns and the text of the Bible combined with many elements of music that the enslaved Africans had brought with them from Africa, such as antiphony (the call-and-response pattern) and syncopation. This eventually formed into the genre called spirituals.

They began as oral performances passed down by word of mouth but with the access to literacy that eventually followed the Emancipation Proclamation enslaved Africans eventually had their voices printed beyond orality. Published spirituals allowed the songs to spread throughout the U.S. and attracting attention in Europe. Men like Frederick Douglass took notice and commentated on the genre, the religious aspects of it made it much more appealing to other African Americans.

Many other African-American music genres, such as gospel and jazz, developed from this genre.

Spirituals would continue to be created and played by African Americans post emancipation as well, bands like the Fisk Jubilee Singers would spread across America. While a couple bands like the Fisk Jubilee Singers made main stage appearances a bulk of Spirituals would be in small Black churches.

== Protest Music of the African Diaspora ==
=== 2016-present ===
As the music of the African Diaspora progresses, more recent and popular songs have demonstrated an act of protest in their lyrics and significant elements that are featured in the music of the African Diaspora. An example of a song would be, "Formation" by the African-American singer, Beyoncé; released in 2016. This popular musical composition mentioned racial injustice events that triggered the Black Lives Matter Movement (e.g. police brutality/violence) but, also included Beyoncé embracing her distinct African heritage. The current protest music scene has benefited greatly from the contributions of other musicians as well. For example: With its upbeat lyric "We gon' be alright," Kendrick Lamar's 2015 single "Alright" became an anthem for the Black Lives Matter movement and reverberated throughout protests and demonstrations. Lamar further cemented his status as a protestor with his 2015 album To Pimp a Butterfly, which was an artistic investigation of racial injustice, police brutality, and African-American identity.

== Authenticity ==
In his book, The Black Atlantic, Sociologist Paul Gilroy starts a discussion of authenticity in the Black trans-Atlantic arena of diasporic music production by presenting how black music has become a truly global phenomenon leading to a dilution of black music into an ever-increasing number of genres and styles across the world. This dilution has created tension around what music can be considered authentically Black.

In understanding how authenticity is conceived, Gilroy discusses how authenticity functions as an aspect of Black music that comes from perceived proximity to the origin of said music. On page 96 of his book The Black Atlantic he was quoted saying:

“folk, or local expressions of Black culture have been identified as authentic and positively evaluated for that reason, while subsequent hemispheric or global manifestations of the same cultural forms have been dismissed as inauthentic and therefore lacking in cultural or aesthetic value precisely because of their distance (supposed or actual) from a readily identifiable point of origin.”

However, Gilroy proceeds to counter this perception by saying, “In all these cases it is not enough for critics to point out that representing authenticity involves artifice. This may be true, but it is not helpful when trying to evaluate or compare cultural forms let alone in trying to make sense of their mutation.” By making the word artifice synonymous with the representation of authenticity in this context, Gilroy is acknowledging the lack of definitive ability to denote authenticity. Gilroy then goes a step further to express how sticking to conversations of what is authentic hurts our ability to better understand the “mutation” of Black music as it engages and it changed by the Black Diaspora.

In understanding the motivations behind pronouncing authenticity, Gilroy identifies the financial and market-based benefits to this pronouncement by saying, “the discourse of authenticity has been a notable presence in the mass marketing of successive Black folks cultural forms to white audiences,” demonstrating the reason for desiring being denoted as authentic. However, he also acknowledges that even seemingly authentic art forms like hip-hop, an American art form, are diasporic in nature incorporating global influences into their origin questioning how definitive apparent authenticity can be. Gilroy describes Hip-Hop as having “formal borrowings from the linguistic innovations of Jamaica's distinct modes of 'kinetic orality,' "This flips his earlier description of authenticity on its head by presenting a seemingly culturally regional and authentic Black art form as a truly global manifestation, depicting how ambiguous authenticity can be. As such, Gilroy effectively deconstructs the concept of authenticity.

== See also ==
- Music of Black Origin Awards
- List of musical genres of the African diaspora
