= Kasékò =

Musical genre from French Guiana

- Stylistic origins: Africa, Europe, America
- Cultural origins: Slavery in French Guiana
- Typical instruments: Tibwa, tanbou foulé, tanbou koupé, tanbou plonbé

Fusion genres
- Léròl

Regional scenes
- French Guiana

Other topics
- Music of French Guiana

Kasékò is a musical genre from French Guiana. It also designates the drums as well as the dance of this musical genre. This is a fusion of African, European and American styles.

Like gwo ka and bélé, Kasékò from French Guiana is also a rhythm and a dance and is played with 3 drums and a Ti-bwa.

== Etymology ==
The Guianan Creole term Kasékò derives from the French expression casser le corps (break the body) which was used during slavery in French Guiana to indicate a swift dance.

== History ==
=== Origin ===
Kasékò is an autogenic music based on the traditional dances of African slaves and mixed with European and Amerindian cultural contributions.

== Instruments ==
The Kasékò is played with four instruments :

- Tibwa or ti-bwa;
- Three "tanbou" (drum) :
  - Tanbou foulé or foulé kasékò,
  - Tanbou koupé or dékoupé,
  - Tanbou plonbé or foulé fon.
