= ZNBN-FM =

Radio station

ZNH-FM
- Nassau, Bahamas; Bahamas
- Broadcast area: New Providence, Bahamas
- Frequency: 92.5 MHz
- Branding: 92.5 FM

Programming
- Format: Caribbean Music, Junkanoo, rake-and-scrape

History
- Former call signs: ZSS-FM
- Call sign meaning: ZN (former ITU prefix under United Kingdom rule) BahamiaN

Technical information
- ERP: 1,000 watts
- Transmitter coordinates: 25°01′36″N 77°21′55″W

Links
- Webcast: https://tunein.com/radio/Bahamian-Or-Nuttin-s239034/
- Website: Official website

ZNBN-FM is a radio station in Nassau, Bahamas broadcasting a Caribbean Music, Bahamian Junkanoo and rake-and-scrape radio format.
