= Edmond Mondesir =

- Born: 6 January 1948 (age 78); Fort-de-France, Martinique
- Genres: bélé
- Instruments: Vocals, Tambour bélé, Bass guitar, Guitar
- Years active: 1980–present
- Label: Awimusic - Apal
- Website: myspace.com/edmondmondesir

Edmond Mondesir was born in Fort-de-France (Martinique) in 1948. His achievements include title of Professor of Philosophy, writer and composer, he is also a singer and an awarded « tanbou bélé » musician.

== Biography ==
After finishing his philosophy career he returned to his birthplace in Martinique. He then participates in many traditional groups and starts to investigate in the North Martinique's provinces searching for the authentic Bèlé.

After this starting road, he creates with Léon Bertide the group Bèlènou in 1980 and records his first Bèlé's album, with his own compositions and a traditional touch. In 1983, it comes out their second album, consecrated to modern instrumental Bèlé. Between 1980 and 2002 Edmond Mondésir makes nine productions, divided between traditional Bèlé and modern Bèlé, between sung bèlé and instrumental Bèlé.

During their 25 years career he performed with his group on the Martinica's most prestigious stages. The artist's fame expands all over the Caribbean and Latin America, and it was in a Cuban festival where he found the inspiration for the song "Santiago".

In 2003, he received the SACEM award as a homage to his whole work.

Edmond Mondésir is recognized in the Bèlé music of Martinique. He is a cultural militant that has been fighting for thirty years for the Maritinican People to be proud of their cultural identity.

The first album with Manuel Mondésir: « Emosion Bèlè - Les chants du père, la musique du fils » (2006) made and arranged by his son Manuel is the symbol of a bridge between two generations, an exotic and calm trip over a music with roots and multiple aspects.

In 2008 the second collaboration with Manuel Mondésir: « Emosion Bèlè 2 - Hommage à Ti Emile ». It's a tribute to one of the greatest singer of bèlè Ti Emile (1925–1992).

In 2009, he released two albums "Sé Pou La viktwa Nou Ka Alé" and "Nou Pa Pè".

2011, marks the reissue of "Emosion Bèlè" [remastered album and credited with 5 new titles for the first time available in France] and the European tour of the artist.

In March 2011, Edmond Mondesir receives the "Prix France Musique des Musiques du monde 2011" award.

== Discography ==
=== Bélénou discography ===
- 1980: Bèlènou (Lanné Tala)
- 1983: Bèlènou (Chimen Tala)
- 1987: Syèl Kléré
- 1990: Emosyon Tambou-a
- 1992: An ti van frémi
- 1998: Janbé Lizyè
- 2000: Retrospektiv

=== Edmond Mondésir discography ===
- 1995: Mélodi Bèlè
- 2002: Manmay Bèlè
- 2006: Emosion Bèlè - Les chants du père, la musique du fils (with Manuel Mondésir)
- 2008: Emosion Bèlè 2 - Hommage à Ti-Emile (with Manuel Mondésir)
- 2009: Sé Pou La Viktwa Nou Ka Alé
- 2009: Nou Pa Pè
- 2011: Emosion Bèlè (reissue remastered with 5 new tracks)

== Bibliography ==
- 2004: Les jours Innocents (aux Éditions Lafontaine).
