= Music of the Turks and Caicos Islands =

The music of Turks and Caicos Islands is best known for its ripsaw music. It is accompanied by an array of instruments, including maracas, triangles, box guitar, conga drums, goat and cowskin drums, accordion, concertina and, most prominently and uniquely, the carpenter saw.

The saw is scraped with a metal object, such as a screwdriver, to produce a unique sound; this is called ripping the saw. The use of the saw (which is the origin of the term ripsaw) is of uncertain origin, but may be in imitation of the Dominican and Haitian guiro or traditional African instruments such as the shekere and djembe.

A closely related style called rake and scrape is known in the Bahamas, closely associated with Cat Island, the home of many Turks and Caicos islanders, who moved there looking for work in the 1920s, 1930s and 1940s. Many Bahamian musicians are from the islands, including The Cooling Waters, Sly Roker, Bradley Dean, Marvin Handfield, Perry Delancy, and Leo Jones. Many of these expatriates have since returned to Turks and Caicos, bringing with them Bahamian junkanoo music.

Modern ripsaw pioneers include Tell and the Rakooneers and Lovey Forbes, who created a new style called combina in the early 1980s, using genres from across the Caribbean and the US as inspiration; these included jazz, calypso, soca and reggae.

== Musician institutions ==
The organisation TUCA helps to promote Turks and Caicos folk music and dance. The Turks and Caicos Music and Poetry Festival is a major annual event, attracting such artists as (in 2004) Chaka Khan, Maxi Priest, Boyz II Men, Joe, Shocking Vibes Band, TCI All Star Band and Blakout Crew. The first First Annual Turks & Caicos Ripsaw Festival was held in 2003.
