= List of Caribbean idiophones =

Historically, idiophones (percussion instruments without membranes or strings) have been widespread throughout the Caribbean music area, which encompasses the islands and coasts of the Caribbean Sea. Some areas of South America that are not geographically part of the Caribbean, but are culturally associated with its traditions, such as Guyana, Suriname, French Guiana and parts of Brazil are also taken into account.

Although some idiophones such as the mayohuacán and probably the maraca already existed among the indigenous Taíno population of the Greater Antilles before the Spanish colonization of the Americas, most idiophones were introduced in the Caribbean between the 17th and 19th centuries by enslaved Africans, which were ethnically diverse (Yoruba, Ewe, Fon, Igbo, Efik, Mandinka and Kongo, among others). Because of the different materials present in the islands, African slaves had to construct their instruments differently, and thus new instruments began to be developed.

| Instrument | Tradition | Hornbostel–Sachs classification | Description |
|---|---|---|---|
| agogô agogó | Lucumí (Cuba) and other Yoruba traditions throughout the Caribbean and Brazil | 111.221 | Hoe blade, struck with a nail or other heavy object |
| akanikã | Abakuá (Cuba) | 111.242.222 | Belt with many attached bells |
| asson baksor (Note: asson can also refer to the ogan in Northern Haiti) | Haiti | 1 | Hollow calabash with a hole, which the player plugs during performance, where the stem used to be, covered in beaded webbing |
| assot | Haiti | 1 | Wooden board, sometimes attached to a tymbale |
| assongwé | Arará (Cuba) | 112.13 | Rattle made of tin, with both ends conical and an attached handle, used by Arará priests |
| atcheré | Lucumí (Cuba) | 112.12 | Oblong rattle made from a gourd, and covered with a network of webbing laced with nuts or beads |
| bakosó arwé-koesolé | Lucumí (Cuba) | 112.12 | Large rattle made from a calabash, and covered with a network of webbing laced with nuts or beads |
| banká ekón, ekóng | Abakuá (Cuba) | 111.242.121 | Metal bell, struck with a wooden stick; the location of the strike determines pitch |
| bell | Trinidad and Tobago | 1 | Hand bell, used in the Spiritual Baptist musical tradition |
| bell, Santería | Lucumí (Cuba) | 111.242.121 | Bell with an external striker |
| bench | Trinidad and Tobago | 1 | Ordinary sitting bench, used spontaneously by banging against the ground in the Spiritual Baptist musical tradition |
| boli chac-chac, shack-shack, xaque-xaque (Brazil), chacha (Cuba) | Trinidad and Tobago | 1 | Hollow calabash with a hole, which the player plugs during performance, where the stem used to be, covered in beaded webbing, used in the Shango cult |
| cajón | Cuba and Puerto Rico | 111.2 | Wooden box played as a bass drum, with hands held in front of the face, often while sitting on the instrument while playing |
| cata | Haiti | 111.231 | Two types of beating tubes: a length of bamboo laid upon two y-shaped sticks in the ground, and a hollow wooden cylinder; both are beaten with sticks |
| catá | Cuba | 111.231 | Hollowed out trunk hit with two sticks, used in tumba francesa, yuka and rumba (rare) |
| cencerro gangária, San Martín (for secular uses only) | Cuba | ? | Large cowbell with no clapper, struck on the outside |
| chekeré abwé | Cuba | 1 | Hollow calabash with a hole, which the player plugs during performance, where the stem used to be, covered in beaded webbing |
| claves | Cuba and Haiti | 111.1 | Cylindrical percussive sticks of African origin, made from hardwood trees like acana, quiebrahacha, guayacán, and granadillo |
| dentli dentlé | Haiti | 112.211 | Notched stick played with a bamboo scraping blade |
| dhantal | Indo-Caribbean Trinidad and Tobago, Guyana and Suriname | 1 | Steel rod, adapted from a piece of a yoke and hit with a beater in a horseshoe-shape, used in chutney |
| door | Cuba | 111.221 | Normal door, beaten with a hand during yambú performances |
| double-conical rattle | Cuba | 112.13 | Double-conical rattle, made of tin and held horizontally, known in Jovellanos |
| erikunde ericunde | Abakuá (Cuba) | 112.13 | Tubular rattle with a looping basket-shaped handle, filled with chunks of wood |
| frying pan | Cuba | 111.24 | Frying pans harnessed to the torso of the player and struck with spoons, played during conga performances |
| geared rattle kwa-kwa | Haiti | 1 | Rattle, used in rara ceremonies |
| grage | Haiti | 112.23 | Metal scraper with small, closely spaced holes, played with a piece of wire or nail |
| guacharaca | Colombia | 112.23 | Long tube scraper made of wood, used in vallenato and cumbia |
| guayo | Cuba | 112.23 | Metal scraper, used in changüí |
| güira | Dominican Republic | 112.23 | Metal scraper, used in merengue and bachata |
| güiro | Cuba, Puerto Rico and the rest of the Caribbean | 112.23 | Gourd scraper of either Taíno or West African origin |
| erimé | Cuba | 112.13 | Set of four rattles attached to a pair of crossed sticks |
| iron | Surinamese Maroons | 111.1 | Pieces of any available metal struck together |
| iron tube, Lucumí | Cuba | 111.242.121 | Hollow iron tube with a slit along the side, played with an external striker |
| guataca | Cuba | ? | cowbell, played using a striker |
| jhanj | Trinidad and Tobago | ? | Pair of large cymbals |
| kwa-kwa tcha-tcha, tcha-kwa | Haiti | 112.13 | Empty gourd filled with seeds; can also refer to the geared rattle |
| kwakwa | Surinamese maroons | 1 | Bench with a wooden top, played with two sticks, from a squatting position |
| maraca shakkas (Garifuna), maruga (Cuba) | Taíno and other tribes (throughout the Caribbean) | 112.13 | Rattle across the Greater and Lesser Antilles, and Central America, made from a hollow gourd, often a calabash, and filled with dried seeds |
| marimba | Guatemala and southern Mexico | 111.212 | Set of wooden bars struck with mallets, descended from the balafon |
| marimbula marimbol (Mexico) | Cuba, introduced to the Dominican Republic and elsewhere | 111.2 | Box mounted with metal strips that can be plucked, used as a bass instrument in rural folk genres like changüí |
| mayohuacán mayohabao, bayohabao | Taíno (Cuba, Hispaniola) | 111.231 | Slit drum made of thin wood, shaped like an elongated gourd |
| ogan | Arará (Cuba) | 111.242.121 | Iron bell, held upside down and struck with a beater; may be used in pairs |
| ogan asson | Haiti | 111.1 | Pieces of chain or other metal struck together |
| quijada | Cuba | 112.122 | Jawbone of a mule or donkey, teeth acting as rattles |
| quinto (cajón) | Cuba | 111.2 | Box with two sloping sides, tapped with the fingers percussively |
| rattle | Surinamese Maroons | 112.13 | Rattle used in both secular and religious purposes, with a specific rhythm for the spirit associated with each ritual |
| rattle-bracelet | Cuba | 112.112 | Bracelets with attached nuts and seeds, worn by drummers in the Kimbisa tradition |
| rumba box | Jamaica | 2 | Maroon instrument used to accompany social dancing, wooden box with three metal brackets on one side |
| shak-shak chac-chac, shack-shack, xaque-xaque (Brazil), chacha (Cuba) | Lesser Antilles | 1 | Rattle, made from a dried gourd, often a calabash, and filled with dried seeds, with a handle attached where the calabash stem had been, not normally decorated or painted, may be placed in a pair |
| shak-shak | Saint Lucia and other Francophone islands | 1 | Rattle, made from a pair of tin cans, emptied, then filled with a few loose pebbles and soldered shut |
| shak-shak | Lesser Antilles | 112.13 | Improvised rattle, made from a single tin can and a few loose pebbles, often played by children practicing for the use of the more common shak-shak or adults at impromptu occasions |
| shepherd's crook | Trinidad and Tobago | 1 | Staff, used spontaneously by banging against the ground in the Spiritual Baptist musical tradition |
| spoons | Cuba | 111.141 | Pair of normal spoons beaten together, common in yambú |
| steelpan steeldrum, tock-tock, belly, base kettle, base bum | Trinidad and Tobago originally, now widespread | 111.2 | Made from tempered metal drums, tuned chromatically |
| tamboo-bamboo | Trinidad and Tobago | 1 | Tuned bamboo stomping tubes, used as a substitute percussion instrument when drums were outlawed |
| tibwa p'tit bois | French Guiana, Saint Lucia and Martinique | 2 | Wooden sticks, played against the rim of a ka, or against a bamboo tube or a log sitting on a stand |
| vaccine bois bourrique | Haiti | 111.2 | Bamboo trumpet, played as an idiophone by tapping it with sticks |
| wacharaca matrimonial | Curaçao | 1 | Metal disks attached to a wooden board |
