= Bouladjel =

Guadeloupean vocal percussion technique

Bouladjèl (also sometimes Boulagèl or Bannjogita) is a vocal percussion technique practiced on the French Caribbean island of Guadeloupe. It consists of a poly-rhythmic superposition of percussive vocalizations (throat sounds, onomatopoeia, gasps) and hand claps performed as an accompaniment to certain forms of traditional singing, mostly songs of mourning and funeral wakes. A bouladjèl performer is known as a boularien.

== Origins ==
Written accounts of bouladjèl are few and recent. It is thought to have developed among Guadeloupean enslaved field workers to replicate drumming at a time when the Code Noir forbade them to use drums, and transmitted orally since. In 1988, Lafontaine presented "boula-gueule" as a vocal polyphony performed during funeral wakes. However, although it is nowadays most specifically a funeral singing practice, local oral accounts state that it was also commonly heard outside of wakes up to the 1970s (e.g. child play, work, leisure singing...). Indeed, during his 1962 visit to Morne-a-l'eau, Guadeloupe, Lomax recorded bouladjèl in both a funeral context ("Bo! Pati") and a work context ("Adolin Do La").

== Performance ==
Bouladjèl is a poly-rhythmic musical form where groups of performers each repeat a distinct & short onomatopoeic pattern of throat sounds, sometimes filtered through hand-formed resonating cavities, to produce complex ostinati together. Though it is considered to be a part of the gwo ka system, traditional bouladjèl excludes the use of musical instruments other than the voice and supporting hand claps. Some sources claim that its underlying base pattern can't be directly mapped to any of the traditional gwo ka rhythms, while others liken it to the pattern known as tumblak.

Ensembles usually comprise two or three individuals to a dozen upwards, in principle all male. They are led by a member called the commandeur de bouladjèl, who signals for the performance to begin with a traditional, spoken statement personalized for each occasion.

At times, performers may also enunciate short comical messages in a rhythmic manner similar to rapping on top of the vocal percussion. In the context of funeral wakes, this stimulates catharsis through laughter as part of the grieving process.

== Recordings ==
- Susan Marcel Mavounzy mentions<> Gaston Germain-Calixte (aka Chaben) and his 1966 recording titled Zombi baré moin.
- Louis Victoire dit Napoléon Magloire, Senval (1963).
- Alan Lomax, Adolin Dola et Bo i Pati (1962), in 'The French Caribbean: We Will Play Love Tonight' (2004).
- Robert Loyson, Canne à la richesse et Si papa mô (Emeraude EM-026, 1966)
- Gaston Germain-Calixte, Zombi baré moin et Clocotè-la (Emeraude EM 023, 1966)
- Yvon Anzala, Gèp-la (1973) et Ti fi la ou té madanm an moin (Anzala, Dolor, Vélo 1974?)
- Lukuber Séjor, Du premier voyage au retour à ka (1993) et Pawol é mizik kon tilili (2002)
- SOFT, Kadans a péyi-la (Kryph 2005); Gouté Gwadloup (Aztec Music 2008); Omaj (Aztec Music 2009)
- Rosan Monza, Adyé Vivilo (Debs 2008); Ki jenné ou jenné (Debs 2011)
- Kimbol, Envitasyon (2008)
- David Murray, Yonn-dé (Justin Time 2003), Gwotet (Justin Time 2008) et The devil tried to kill me (Justin Time 2009)
- Jacques Schwarz-Bart, Soné ka-la (EmArcy 2007)
- Kan'nida, Evariste Siyèd'lon (CD Kyenzenn 2000), Nou ka travay (2007), Tayo (2013).
- Hilaire Geoffroy, Réconciliation (2002)
- Cyrille Daumont, La vi sé on kado (2004)
- Indestwaska, 20 Lanné (2013)
