= Music of the Bahamas =

The music of the Bahamas is associated primarily with Junkanoo, a celebration which occurs on Boxing Day and again on New Year's Day. Parades and other celebrations mark the ceremony. Groups like The Baha Men, Ronnie Butler, Kirkland Bodie and Twindem have gained massive popularity in Japan, the United States and other places. Other popular Bahamian artists include Stileet and Stevie S.

== Calypso ==
Calypso is a style of Afro-Caribbean music which originated in Trinidad and Tobago. This form of music has spread through many parts of the Caribbean, including the Bahamas.

== Soca ==
Soca is a form of dance music which originated from many calypso music in Trinidad and Tobago. It originally combined the melodic lilting sound of calypso with insistent percussion (which is often electronic in recent music) and local chutney music. Soca music has evolved in the last 20 years primarily by musicians from various Anglophone Caribbean countries including Trinidad, Guyana, Saint Vincent and the Grenadines, Barbados, Grenada, Saint Lucia, Antigua and Barbuda, United States Virgin Islands, the Bahamas, Dominica, Saint Kitts and Nevis, Jamaica and Belize.

== Junkanoo ==
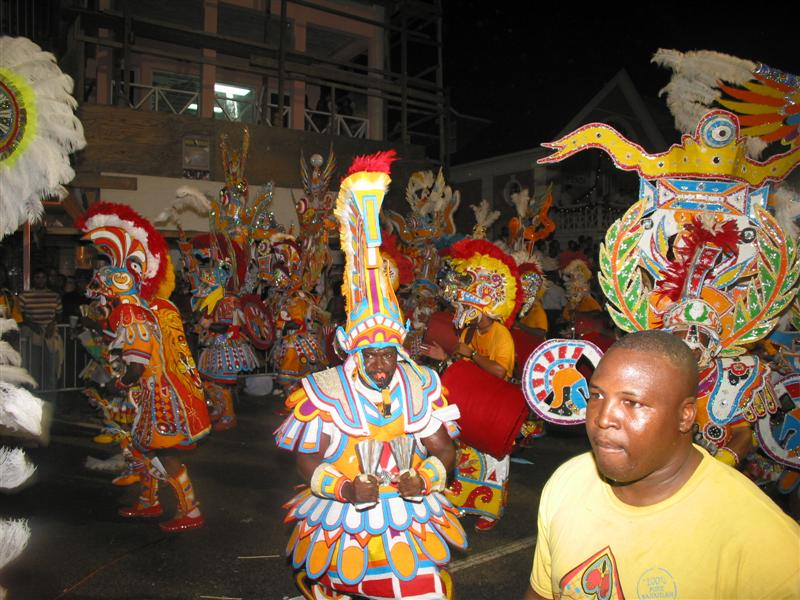
Junkanoo celebration in Nassau

The word Junkanoo is said to be derived from a Ghanaian leader, John Connu, or from the Qujo supreme deity (Canno) and ancestral spirits (jannanin). The junkanoo is still practiced in North Carolina and remnants still exist in Belize. It is most well known, though, from Nassau and Freeport. Since the 1950s the influence of American culture has increased, mainly through TV and radio broadcasts from Florida stations, and other Caribbean styles have made inroads: calypso, reggae and soca, from Jamaica, Cuba, Trinidad, and other islands. Tourism has also had an impact, bringing in Japanese, European and North Americans with their attendant forms of cultural expression. In this milieu more traditional Bahamas performers such as Joseph Spence, have still enjoyed successful careers playing junkanoo, Christian hymns and the ant'ems of the local sponge fishermen, which include "Sloop John B", later made famous by The Beach Boys.

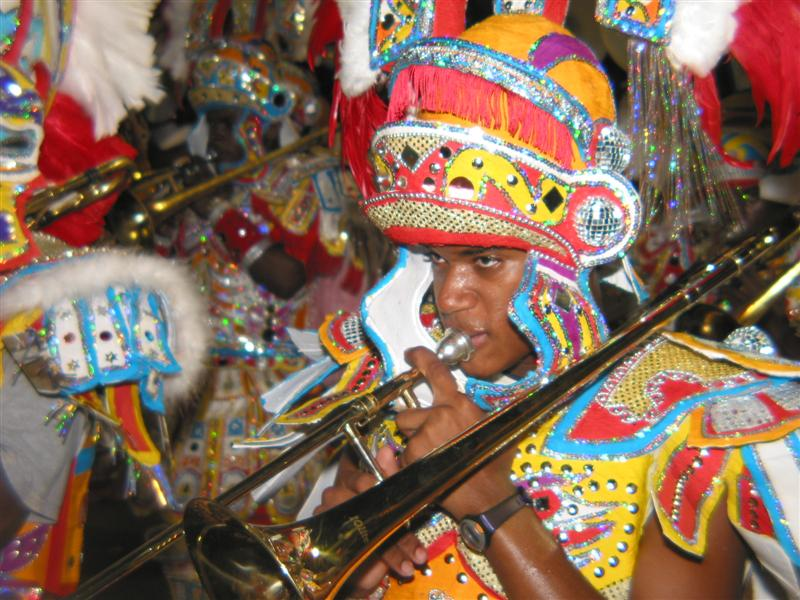
Junkanoo celebration in Nassau in 2003

In 1973, the year the Bahamas achieved independence from the United Kingdom, black professionals of the middle and upper classes began to dominate junkanoo celebrations. Costuming and competitions became more complex and commonplace, and soon became a tourist draw.

Aside from being a type of drum, goombay is also a percussion music made famous by Alphonso 'Blind Blake' Higgs, who played to tourists arriving at Nassau International Airport for several years. Rake-and-scrape music is a unique type of instrumental music made by bending a saw and scraping with a small object, most typically a screwdriver; it is used to accompany dances derived from European forms like polka and waltz. Rake-and-scrape's popularity has been declining in recent years, but performers like Lassie Do and the Boys continue to keep the tradition alive. Christian rhyming spirituals and the ant'ems of sponge fishermen are now mostly dead traditions, decimated by the arrival of pop music, a 1930s sponge blight and other causes.

E. Clement Bethel's master's thesis on traditional Bahamian music was adapted for the stage by his daughter, Nicolette Bethel and Philip A. Burrows. Music of The Bahamas was first performed at the Edinburgh Festival Fringe in 1991, and was revived in 2002 for fresh Bahamian audiences. A recording of that show is available for sale from Ringplay Productions.

== Rake and scrape ==
Rake and scrape music is played traditionally with concertinas, Goombay drums, and a handsaw. Rake and scrape is believed to have originated on the island of Cat Island but evidence suggest that it was emerging in many places simultaneously. The earliest reference to usage of the accordion by Bahamians is in 1886 in an Article in the Nassau Guardian. The term rake and scrape became the norm in 1969 by Charles Carter although he claims the people of Cat Island were already calling it that when he visited the Island.

== Organology of instruments ==
Membranophones: The Goombay drum is the main rhythmic component in rake-n-scrape. It is also referred to a goatskin drum, as the skin of a goat was stretched over a wooden barrel. It is decorated by simple or complex geometric designs in bright colors. The drum is always heated over fire to retain its tone. In 1971, when manufacturers started shipping products in metal barrels, Bahamians switched the drum to metal, slightly changing the tone of the drum.

Idiophones: The main component that makes Rake-N-Scrape unique is the use of the Carpenter's Saw. This instrument is scraped with a nail or butter knife. Bent against the body of the player and flexed, various timbral effects are obtained. In more modern music, the saw is replaced with maracas or a guiro.

Aerophones: The accordion is the component that adds the round form which enables dancers to dance the ring dance. This is of European descent. In more modern bands, it is replaced by an electric guitar or electronic keyboard.

== See also ==
- List of Bahamian musicians
