= Chouval bwa =

Folk music originating from Martinique

- Stylistic origins: Martinique bèlè, and other traditional rhythms.
- Cultural origins: Martinique
- Typical instruments: Traditional: rhythm section: bèlè drums, tibwa, accordions, chacha (a rattle), bamboo flute and comb and paper-type kazoo.

Other topics
- Music of Martinique

Chouval bwa is a kind of folk music originated on the slave plantations of Martinique. There are two versions, traditional and modern. Chouval bwa has been popularized by artists such as Claude Germany, Tumpak, Dede Saint-Prix, and Pakatak.

== History ==
The Martinique bèlè is a legacy of the slave music tradition. The bélé itself is a huge tambour drum that players ride as though it was a horse. It is characterized, in its rhythm, by the "tibwa" (two wooden sticks) played on a length of bamboo mounted on a stand to the tambour bèlè. Added to the tambour bèlè and tibwa are the maracas, more commonly referred to as the chacha. The tibwa rhythm plays a basic pattern and the drum comes to mark the highlights and introduce percussion improvisations.

It is organized in a certain way, the first entry of the singer ( lavwa ) and choir ( lavwa Deye or "answer"). Then the "Bwatè" (player ti bwa) sets the pace, followed by bèlè drum. Finally, the dancers take the stage. A dialogue is created between the dancers and the "tanbouyè" (drummer). The "answer" plays opposite the singer, the audience can also participate.

== Origin ==
The chouval bwa music is the music played by an orchestra to entertain the children sitting on a wooden carousel in Martinique.

=== Characteristics ===
The belair percussionist is typically the leader of the chouval bwa orchestra. Chouval bwa features a drummer on the tanbour drum and the ti bwa, a percussion instrument made out of a piece of bamboo laid horizontally and beaten with sticks; the most traditional ensembles also use accordions, chacha (a rattle) and the bel-air, a bass version of the tanbour, bamboo flute and comb and paper-type kazoo. Call-and-response singing completes the ensemble. The lead singer chooses the sequence of dances through his or her selection of songs, each of which goes with a specific dance. All songs are sung by a chantwèl in créole and concern relations between the sexes, local gossip, and current politics.

== See also ==
- Martinican music
- Culture of Martinique
