= Burru =

Burru is a unique style of drumming used in Jamaican music.

== Description of the rhythm and of the types of drums ==
"Burru" consists of alternations of a beat made by one drummer, and another beat by another drummer, like a conversation between two or more people: this pattern is named call and response, and can be observed in almost all African-rooted music, such as the first Afro-American music genres like blues and gospel, among others. Three types of drums were used in most arrangements: they consisted of "Bass", "Fundeh" and "Repeater" drum. All three drums had very important roles: the Bass drum carried the rhythm, the Fundeh drum added syncopation, and the Repeater drum brought in the melody. Occasionally, lyrics would be incorporated as well into songs. They would still follow the "call and response" pattern.

== History, origin and meanings of the term ==
This style of drumming originated in West Africa, and later moved to the Caribbean as a result of the atlantic slave trade; on the slave plantations, slave masters permitted its continuance as it provided a rhythm for the slaves to work by. The term "burru" originates from the African Twi language word "bru", meaning to "ravage", "strike" or "destroy", and this term is also present in the Jamaican patois, where it refers to an individual that is a "ruffian". For this reason, it was possibly an insult from one Twi speaking slave or Coromantee (an archaic British term to refer to Twi speaking Akan slaves from the inland, north of the Gold Coast) to another. The word also refers to an Ashanti kind of drum called Aburukuwa, cylindrical in shape, and known in Jamaica as "Burru drum".

== How and by who Burru is used ==
Burru has been used in many ways over the years. This style was at first known as a more aggressive form of drumming, due to the loud and hard beats. However, burru in West Africa was used more as a form of cultural expression, and it would frequently have been used in arrangements called talking drums. It has also been used in reggae music, popularised by Count Ossie, and used by artists such as Bob Marley.
