= Long drum =

Long drums are a loose category of tubular membranophones, characterized by their extreme length. They are most common in Africa, Thailand, and in Native American traditions. Long drums can be made out of entire tree trunks.
