= Aburukuwa =

Type of talking drum

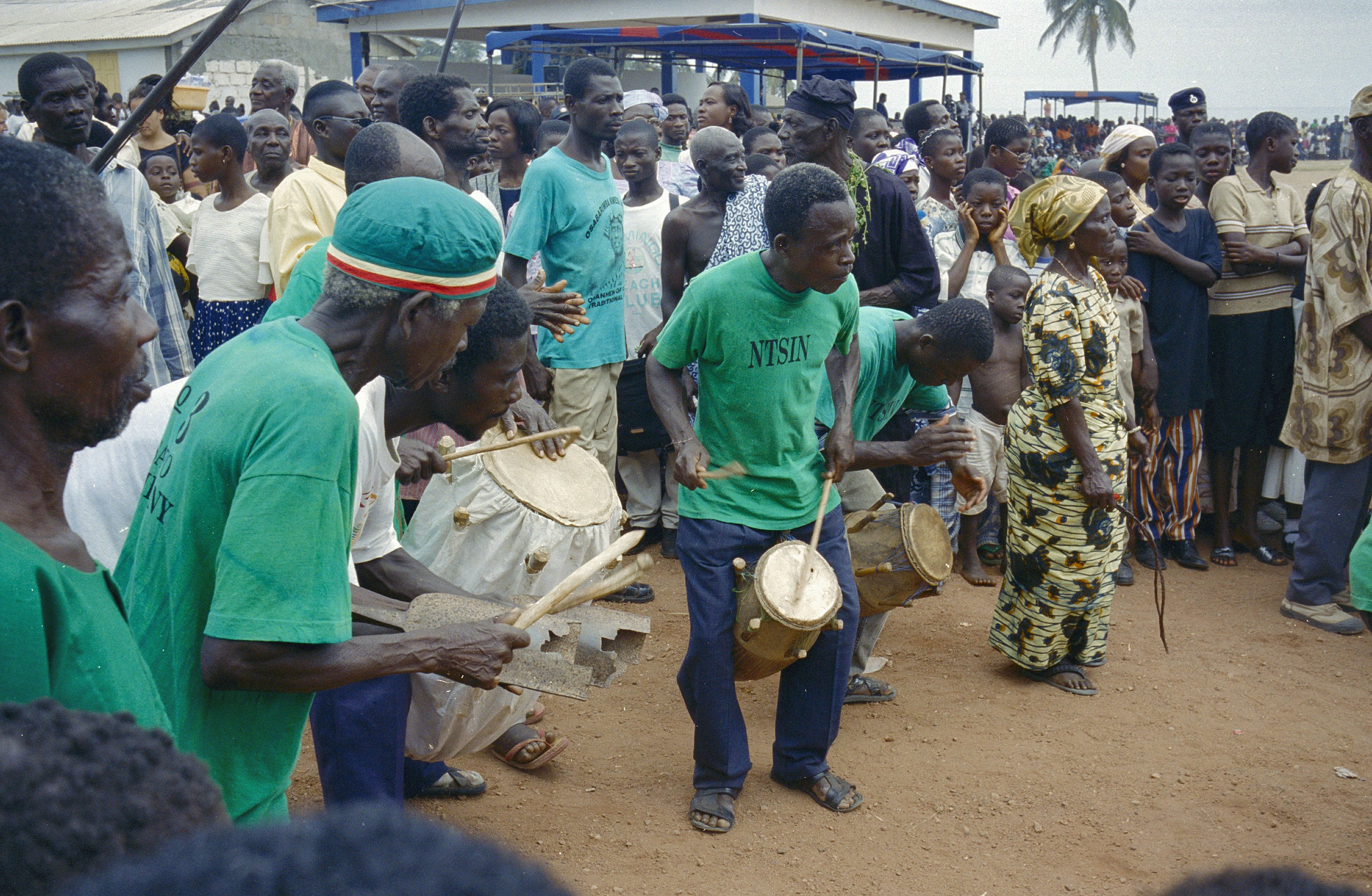
- Akan drums played at an annual fair at Cape Coast, Ghana.

Percussion instrument
- Other names: Abrukwa
- Classification: Membranophone
- Hornbostel–Sachs classification: 211
- Developed: Ghana

The Aburukuwa (also known as the Abrukwa) is an open drum of the Akan people and the Asante people of Ghana. It is a high-pitched talking drum used by the Akan people, bottle-shaped with its skin is held on by pegs. It is usually played with curved sticks. Its sound resembles the birdsong of a bird of the same name.

The Aburukuwa is the smallest of the three drums used by the Asante people during rituals and ceremonies. The Aburukuwa and its sister drums, the Kwadum and the Apentemma, were typically covered by red and black felt to represent death and blood. Although the drums have become associated with funerals and ancestor worship, they were also used during wartime.

== See also ==
- Akan Drum
