= Music of Montserrat =

The music of Montserrat is influenced by Irish traditions, noticeable in the set dance-like Bam-chick-lay, and the presence of fife and drum ensembles similar to the bodhrán. Natives are also witness to the jumbie dance, the style of which is still strongly African. Instruments include the ukulele and shak-shak, an African instrument made from a calabash gourd; both of these are used in traditional string bands. Calypso and spiritual-influenced vocal choirs, like the Emerald Isle Community Singers, are popular.

Past pop stars include the soca bandleader Alphonsus "Arrow" Cassell, known for 1983's "Hot! Hot! Hot!". Calypso music is also popular, as are the vocal choirs Voices and the Emerald Community Singers are well known throughout the island. They perform at various special occasions, such as the December Festival, and throughout the year. The most famous modern string band from Montserrat is the Rude Boys String Band.

Montserratian culture is generally a hybrid of African and European, specifically British and Irish, elements. The African influence is the most pronounced, and manifests itself in the local Creole language, as well as the island's folktales, stories, songs, dances and religion. Montserrat remained largely isolated from international popular culture until the 1960s, and the island's folk traditions remained vibrant until the eruption of the Soufrière Hills volcano in 1995, after which most of the population left the island. The popularity of Arrow also contributed to the demise of traditional music, replaced largely by imported popular styles.

== Folk music ==
Montserrat's folk musical heritage includes a wide array of religious and ritual folk music. There are also folk songs used in spiritual musical traditions, in addition to secular use; indeed, there is little distinction between secular and spiritual aspects of traditional Montserratian culture. Folk songs are generally in the Montserrat Creole language and concern topics ranging from obeah (magic) to agriculture, infidelity and historic occurrences. Many songs are widespread and well-known, and occur in numerous variations, including "Nincom Riley" and "All de Relief", two of the most famous Montserratian folk songs. The folk repertoire also include calypsos and Irish melodies. The Irish Montserratian tradition has largely died out, with the last performer, George Allen, a fiddler, dying in 1966.

=== Jumbie ===
The jumbie dance has been called the "purest manifestation of folk religion on Montserrat", and is an iconic part of folk culture, bringing together local folklore, dance, song and music. It has also been described as a startling and unique hybrid, consisting of "Western instruments (that) produce Africanesque music, to which dancers perform Irish steps while moving their upper bodies like Africans".

The jumbie dance was probably last performed in 1980. Jumbies are traditionally said to be spirits, one of several kinds that also include the African sukra and jabless, and the Irish mermaid, animal spirit (similar to the Púca) and the Jack Lantern. Jumbies hold a similar place in Montserratian society as fairies does in Irish culture; they are the recipients of many small offerings, such as bits of food or drink, and the subject of numerous daily superstitions and rituals.

The jumbie dance is performed by four couples, one man and one woman. They each do a series of sets, consisting of five quadrilles played at successively swifter tempos. The couples will switch out as they get tired, until eventually one becomes possessed by a jumbie. They often move about wildly, fall to the floor and shout in glossolalia.

Some Montserratian Irish trace the origins of the jumbie dance to the pre-emancipation period, when slaves attempted to perform the dances performed by white overseers and landowners. Jumbie dances are traditionally performed after a celebration, in the home of a sponsor, and to mark times of individual crisis or major life changes, such as a wedding or christening. The jumbie dance is said to induce spiritual possession and grant divination skills. Often, jumbie dances are intended to cure diseases, remove curses or discover the identity of a guilty party.

There are generally three jumbie dancers in a unit, who perform accompanied by the babala (tambourine, or jumbie drum), triangle, fife or pulley (accordion, concertina or melodeon), and most importantly the French reel (also jumbie drum or woowoo), a skin drum that produces an ominous sound which is said to attract the jumbie spirits. Both the babala and French reel are similar to the Irish bodhran in construction; all three drums are played with the fingertips, palms and the backs of the hands.

=== Other folk traditions ===
The same music used in the jumbie dance also accompanies country dances (also known as goatskin or drum dance). Country dances are strictly recreational, however, and use different songs and dances than the jumbie dance. Rum shops are frequently home to string bands, especially on Boxing Day, and ensembles of guitar, banjo, accordion and cuatro (ukulele).

The Montserratian tradition of masquerading is both a ritual and celebratory element of folk music. Groups of dancers (masqueraders) with bright costumes and voluminous adornments, including whips (hunters) that are used for the Masqueraders to move crowds away as they parade the streets, scare away evil spirits and send signals to other dancers. Masqueraders travel door to door and receive small gifts, while dancing a standard set of dances consisting of a heel-and-toe polka and five quadrilles. This celebration begins in mid-December and ends January 1.

Montserrat is also home to a string band folk tradition that provides accompaniment to many kinds of songs and dances. These generally include the ukulele (yokolee, imported from Hawaiian music), guitar, triangle, the bass boom pipe, shak-shak, gradge and fife. String bands traditionally performed for weddings; this tradition declined with the rise of stereos and recorded music, as well as the spread of jazz bands, but was revived in the 1970s. String bands now also play at hotels and nightclubs.

== Popular music and modern styles ==
The steel band tradition is common to many Caribbean, and especially Lesser Antillean, islands. The Montserratian tradition began in 1949 in Ryner's Village and Kinsale, and was prominent enough by the following year to be played at the Empire Day celebrations. Despite some criticism that the music was degrading for children, steel bands have become a major part of the island's musical heritage.

Calypso is an originally Trinidadian style of music that has since spread across the world. In recent years it has become a major part of Montserratian music, with the rise of Alphonsus "Arrow" Cassell, a soca artist who is internationally renowned. Calypso in Montserrat dates to the 1950s, and Justin "Hero" Cassell (Arrow's brother), who won the islands calypso competition thirteen times and became the Calypso King of the Organization of Eastern Caribbean States. In 2000, Sylvina "Khandie" Malone became the first female calypso monarch on Montserrat. A popular song on local radio is "Sailing Away Again" by local writer and singer Eloise Lynch. Her main focus is Lovers Rock but this song has always been a popular favorite on the island. https://www.youtube.com/watch?v=z84Zc_YHnps

== Holidays and festivals ==
The Montserrat December Festival (the local Carnival tradition) is the biggest holiday of the year, held all through the month of December concluding on January 1 and ending with a street parade. The Festival is like Carnival on the other Caribbean islands, featuring competitions in various skills, especially the Calypso King competition, street dancing (jamming or jumping up), Soca King, beauty pageants and masquerade performances. There are also Christmas songs and caroling.

December Festival parades formerly included music and masqueraders, and dancers in uniforms modeled on the Grenadier Guards. Music is provided by an ensemble of triangle, fife and two goatskin, deep-barreled drums called kettles or booms). This tradition is primarily African in style, with little Irish or British influence, and is very distinct from jumbie dance styles. The traditional music of the December Festival was last performed in 1988, in St. John's Village.

Boxing Day is an occasion for music competitions, held in Sturge Park. Steelbands, village groups, masquerade ensembles and mummers all perform. Jump-up Day commemorates and celebrates emancipation from slavery, and is accompanied by steelbands, masquerades and dancing men carrying chains to symbolize the bondage of slavery.

Music is also an important part of Saint Patrick's Day, which is a celebration of Montserrat's Irish heritage and music and has now been transformed into a whole week of activities.

== Music for Montserrat ==
AIR Studios, a recording studio operated by George Martin, used to be on the island, and performers like the Rolling Stones, Sting and Elton John traveled there to record. After Hurricane Hugo, however, the studios were closed. Martin organized a fundraiser (Music for Montserrat) for the island in 1997, which included native band Arrow, Mark Knopfler, Jimmy Buffett, Paul McCartney, Eric Clapton, Phil Collins, Carl Perkins (who died the next year), Sting and Elton John. Other local bands performed simultaneously at Gerald's Bottom on the island; the occasion also saw the reformation of Climax Blues Band and the appearance of Bankie Banks.
