= Ripsaw music =

Musical genre

Ripsaw is a style of Mento, which originates from the Turks and Caicos Islands (specifically in the Middle and North Caicos). A very closely related variant, rake-and-scrape, is played in the Bahamas. Its most distinctive characteristic is the use of the common handsaw as the primary instrument, along with various kinds of drums, box guitar, concertina, triangle and accordion.

Ripsaw is a unique fusion of Mento and Burru, which replaces the grater (Instrument) used in traditional Mento with a handsaw (Instrument) to achieve a similar yet more variable sound. The saw is played by scraping an object, usually an old knife blade, along the saw's teeth, while bending the saw to produce a different timbre. The sound is similar to a paper being ripped, and is believed to be the origin of the term ripsaw.

In the Bahamas, Cat Island is the only place to celebrate rake-and-scrape on a large scale. During June's Labour Day celebration, the island holds a Cat Island Rake and Scrape festival.
