= Boula (music) =

Caribbean drums

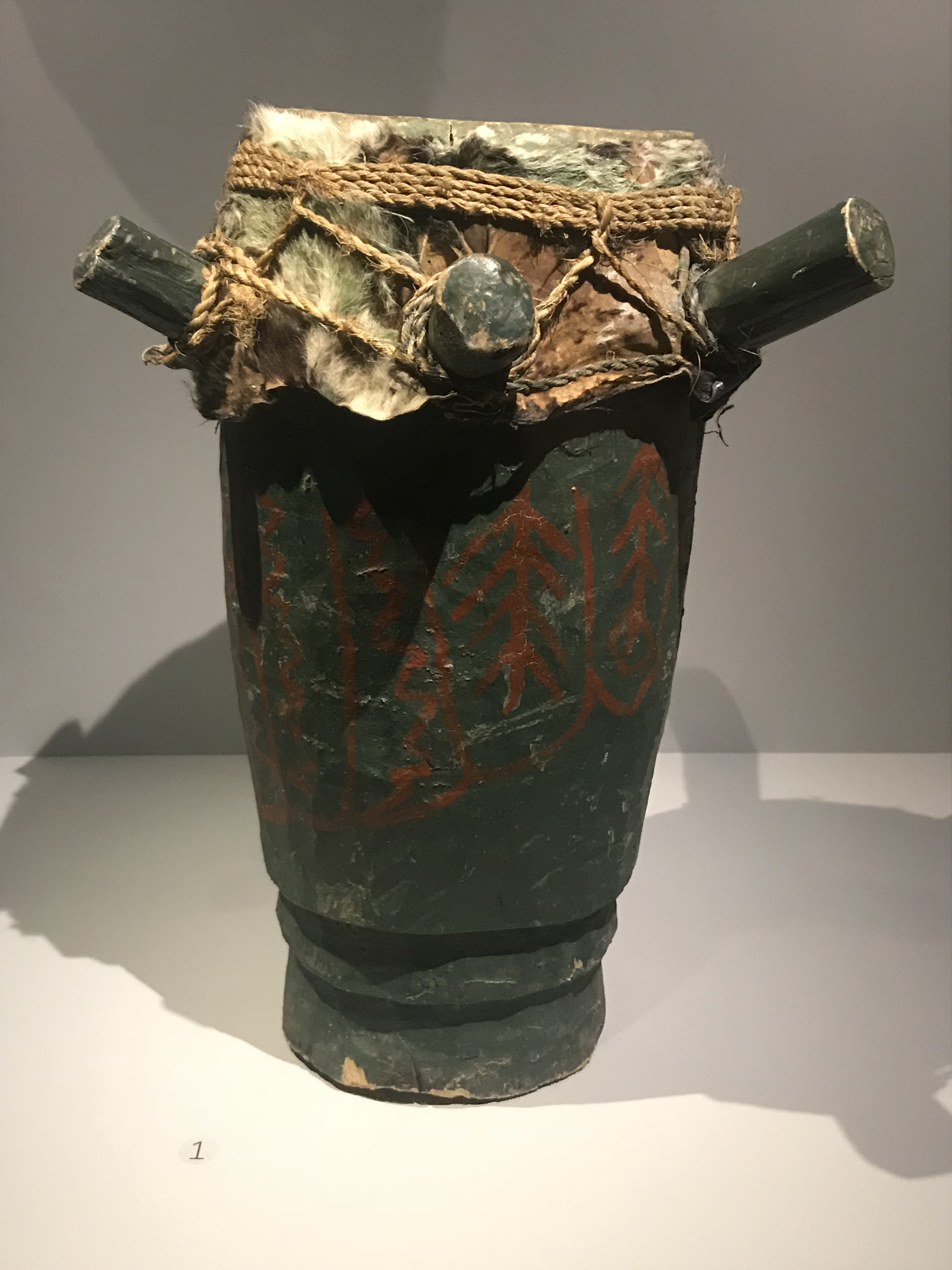
- A boula drum from Haiti.

Percussion instrument
- Other names: Tambour Boula (Haïti)
- Classification: Percussion
- Hornbostel–Sachs classification: 211.221.2-7

The word boula can refer to at least four different drums played in the Caribbean music area.

== Boula in the Caribbean ==
In the Lesser Antilles region of the Caribbean, the boula drum is used in the big drum traditions.

=== Carriacouan boula ===
The boula of Carriacou is also a hand drum, now most often made of rum casks. It is also called the tambou dibas, and is used in the big drum tradition.

=== Grenadian boula ===
In Grenada, a boula is a membranophone with an opened-bottom used in a big drum ceremony.

=== Guadeloupean boula ===
The Guadeloupean boula is a hand drum, similar to the tambou bèlè, and is used in gwo ka and special occasions likes wakes, wrestling matches and Carnival celebrations. It is a hand drum that plays low-pitched sounds and is played single-handed and transversally.

=== Haitian boula ===
In the Greater Antilles of Haiti, the boula is in the same family as the Manman, Segon, and is the smallest of the three (7-8 inches in diameter and 18 – 24 inches tall) and is responsible for playing an ostinato pattern which really propels the rhythm forward. This drum is played with two sticks, and the base rests flat on the floor. The tone created is high, but somewhat muted. While this drum's parts seem simple, it requires true skill and stamina to play them accurately, especially at fast tempos. This drum serves the same function as the boula in the rada batterie and is played in the same way. Drummers claim that this addition "heats-up" the music.

=== Trinidadian boula ===
The boula of Trinidad and Tobago accompanies the stick-fighting dance called kalenda, and is a double-headed barrel drum, played open-handed.
