= Music of Grenada =

The music of Grenada has included the work of several major musicians, including Eddie Bullen, David Emmanuel, one of the best-selling reggae performers ever, and Mighty Sparrow, a calypsonian. The island is also known for jazz, most notably including Eddie Bullen, a pianist, songwriter and record producer currently residing in Canada. Kingsley Etienne, a keyboardist, while the Grenadan-American Joe Country & the Islanders have made a name in country music.

African dances brought to Grenada survive in an evolved form, as have European quadrilles and picquets. Some of the most popular recent styles of these dances include "Heel-and-Toe" and "Carriacou Big Drum and Quadrille", with popular dancers including Willie Redhead, Thelma Phillips, Renalph Gebon and the Beewee Ballet.

Independence in 1974 launched a Grenadian national identity which was exemplified in the calypso of the time, which tended to be intensely patriotic. More modern calypso performers have experimented, using political commentary and poetry to expand the possibilities of Grenadian calypso. Indian influences have also changed the sound of Grenadian calypso.

== Popular music ==
Popular forms of music in Grenada are calypso, soca and to a lesser extent reggae and dancehall. Soca produced in Grenada has a distinct style that takes the name of "jab jab" soca.

== Carriacou ==
Many years of domination by the British and the French have left behind influences in Carriacou, in songs like lullabies and reels, cantique, chanteys and quadrilles.

Carriacou is an island north of Grenada, best known for the Big Drum Afro-Caribbean song-style and Quadrille. Big Drum dates back to at least the late 18th century. Carriacou's Afro-Caribbean population is divided into nations, each of which has a distinct rhythm that identifies it; Big Drum glorifies the ancestors of these nations, which include the Manding, Chamba, Temne, Moko, Igbo, Banda, Arada, Kongo and Cromanti. The Cromanti, being the biggest nation, begins the Big Drum ceremony with a song called "Cromanti Cudjo" (or "Beg Pardon"); this is followed by the other nations' songs, all of which are based on short, declamatory phrases with choruses, accompanied by two boula drums and a single, higher-pitched cut drum, both of which are made from rum barrels. Big Drum music is used to honor the memory of the dead if the deceased's family is not able to have the traditional Tombstone Feast.

Quadrille was developed in France during the 18th century as a court dance for Napoleon, the Quadrille was brought to England, and then introduced to the colonial Caribbean during the early 19th century, providing entertainment on social occasions for planters. Slaves were forbidden to practice their culture, as the planters realized their music and dance were used to communicate, and to plan their release strategies. However, to save on the expenses of bringing musicians from England, slaves were engaged to provide music for planters’ parties. Forbidden to practice their own dances, African musicians and house workers learned the dance of the English planters, taking it into their camps and altering it. Slaves used the Quadrille to mock the planters but more importantly used this newly approved dancing time to secretly formulate uprisings to hasten their freedom. Carriacou versions of the Quadrille feature four men and four women, forming a square and are accompanied by tambourine, bass drum, violin and triangle. Dance styles can be either formal, with couples gliding rigidly in turn, or a more free style where all couples dance at the same time with unfettered movements and improvisations. This dance surpasses the Big Drum in rhythm but does not have the variety and the significance of the African Nation Dance. You can view these dances at cultural celebrations.

The funeral music of Carriacou is a major part of the island's folk music; Carriacouan religion centers on reverence for the "Old Parents", the apocryphal founders of the island's society. The saraca funerary rite, practiced on Carriacou and throughout the Grenadines, involves music, storytelling and feasting; saraca songs include both European and African lyrics. African elements, such as the call-and-response style, are often present.

== Notes ==
1. Musical Traditions
2. Musical Traditions
3. Musical Traditions
4. Musical Traditions
5. Paradise Inn
6. Paradise Inn
7. Paradise Inn
