= Big Drum =

Big Drum is a genre, a musical instrument, and traditional African religion from the Windward Islands. It is a kind of Caribbean music, associated mostly closely with the music of Saint Vincent and the Grenadines, Music of Guadeloupe, Carriacou in Grenada and in the music of Saint Kitts and Nevis.

== Origin ==
All big drum celebration is accompanied by the boula drum. The word boula can refer to at least four different drums played in the Caribbean music area.

The Guadeloupean boula is a hand drum, similar to the tambou bèlè, and is used in gwo ka and special occasions likes wakes, wrestling matches and Carnival celebrations. It is a hand drum that plays low-pitched sounds and is played single-handed and transversally.

The boula of Carriacou is also a hand drum, now most often made of rum casks. It is also called the tambou dibas, and is used in the Big Drum tradition.

The boula of Trinidad and Tobago accompanies the stick-fighting dance called kalenda, and is a double-headed barrel drum, played open-handed.

== Carriacou ==
The inhabitants of Carriacou perform the "Big Drum", "Gwa Tambu", or "Nation" dance to celebrate their West African ancestors that were brought to the island during slavery. These Big Drum dances are usually performed at "Maroons", also known as village festivals held in spring to call for rain, and fetes, where food and drink are prepared. They can also be danced at wakes and tombstone feasts in honor of dead relatives to lay them to rest, marriage ceremonies, fishing boat launchings, and in the case of ill-health or ill-fortune. On each occasion, the main focus is twofold: remembering lineage and respecting ancestors. The music consists of singing and chanting typically joined by two boula drums and one cutter drum, named Mama, Papa, and Baby, respectively, as well as shakers and maracas.

This religious tradition used to be practiced in Grenada as well, but was erased by the Yoruba's religious presence on the larger island. While food is prepared during the day in large pots over fire, the actual Big Drum Dance ceremony starts at night. Libations of rum and water, known as "wetting of the ground", are made during the day. This is done to ask for the blessings of the gods and ancestors, and serves as an invitation for them to enter "the dance ring" and join the dance. There is no priest, but instead a chantwell (chantuelle). This is the lead singer of the ceremony, and is usually related to the deceased if it is being performed for a funeral. The chantwell, drummers, and dancers are allowed to enter the dance ring while the community sings and watches from the outside. The dancers are usually women, but occasionally men. Drummers are usually elderly men, known as "old heads." Dancers perform barefoot within the circle and wear African headscarves, white dresses, and winged skirts with African prints.

The "Nation" songs of the tradition have allowed Carriacouans/Kayaks to trace their ancestry to several ethnic groups. (Cromanti, Moko, Chamba, Temne, Hausa, Kongo, Igbo, and Mandinka). These songs are the oldest and usually performed first, with the very first song being "Anansi-O Sari Baba". This song praises the famed Akan deity, Anansi, and asks for the sins of the community to be forgiven, simultaneously venerating the Cromanti ancestors. This is then followed by "Kromanti Cudjoe", another Akan song that awakens the ancestors. Other nation songs follow, honoring the Temne, Hausa, Igbo, Arada, Quail Bay (Bakongo), Moko, Chamba, and Mandinka nations/ancestors. These songs also praise other deities, such as Legba in "Ibole Ibole Woy Yo" (Igbo Nation song where the singers describe pounding red plantain to feed him with, and a dancer moves from side to side, gesturing giving food.), "Arada Dore Mi De" (Arada Nation/Vodun song where singers and dancers ask Dambala and Nu to dance with them and defend them from trickery.), and "Free Ring" (Quail Bay/Bakongo Nation song where no one dances, as it is believed the Bakongo ancestors and the Nksisi prefer to dance alone. This song also pays respect to every singer, dancer, and drummer of the tradition.) "Mawu-Lisa" while not a nation song, calls on the Fon-Ewe spirit of day and night as a kalenda (stick-fight) starts.

Belle and hallecord songs follow the "nation" songs. Unlike the nation songs, which tend to retain their indigenous lyrics, these are sung in Kayak (french) creole, also known as patois. They are a blend of the African and European cultures of the island, and this can be seen in the dances. Frivolous pikes are the last type of song. Also, sung in creole, these are fun folk songs and work songs that anyone is allowed to enter the ring and dance to. Many of them come from neighboring islands (Grenada, Trinidad, Dominica, and Antigua). and "Mawu-Lisa" (Arada Nation/Vodun song for "kalendas" also known as stick fighting.) The Big Drum Dance is concluded with two songs, "In My Own Native Land/Mon Konn Kongo Kon Mwen Vle" and "Bring the Powder".

According to Winston Fleary, famed historian, Big Drum performer and cultural ambassador of Grenada, the first drummer of the Big Drum in Carriacou was Viri Kiri, son of Marie Galante, a Bakongo woman. The song "Kromanti Cudjoe" is named after a Jamaican maroon that had been brought to Grenada. After losing a battle with the British, Kromanti Cudjoe and his friend, Fedon, fled to Carriacou and helped start the Big Drum Dance evolve. Fleary had also traced the Belle Kawe dances to Benin. They had made their way to Haiti via the slave trade before arriving in Carriacou in the 18th century. The spider dance done with the song "In My Own Native Land/ Mon Konn Kongo Kon Mwen Vle" is another salute to Anansi. This song was added to the tradition in 1783 when the British, the new owners of Grenada, Carriacou, and Petit Martinique, banned drumming in the West Indies. Carriacou's inhabitants did not obey, and composed this song in protest.

Many songs also mention Dahomey, such as "Djerika-o!" and "Hausa Wele", showcasing the African continent's lack of physical borders between various ethnic groups. While the languages that the Big Drum Dance are performed in are no longer understandable by Carriacouans/Kayaks, the tradition is still practiced earnestly.

== Guadeloupe ==
Gwo ka is the French creole term for Big drum.

The Guadeloupean boula is a hand drum, similar to the tambou bèlè, and is used in gwo ka and special occasions likes wakes, wrestling matches and Carnival celebrations. It is a hand drum that plays low-pitched sounds and is played single-handed and transversally.

== Saint Kitts and Nevis ==
Big Drum is played in Saint Kitts and Nevis, alongside a kettle drum, and a fife during Carnival and Culturama celebrations.

== Saint Vincent and the Grenadines ==
Vincentian big drums are traditionally made from tree trunks, but are more often made from rum kegs now. The socially aware or satirical lyrics are usually performed by a female singer called a chantwell, and is accompanied by dancers in colorful skirts and headresses. Big Drum is commonly performed at weddings and other celebrations, especially the launches of boats.

== See also ==
- Boula
