= Music of Saint Vincent and the Grenadines =

The music of Saint Vincent and the Grenadines includes thriving music scenes based on Big Drum, calypso, soca, steelpan and also reggae. String band music, quadrille, bélé music and traditional storytelling are also popular.

== Soca ==
Soca is a form of dance music that originated in Trinidad and Tobago from calypso music. It originally combined the melodic lilting sound of calypso with insistent percussion (which is often electronic in recent music) and local chutney music. Soca music has evolved in the last 20 years primarily by musicians from Trinidad, Grenada, Guyana, Saint Vincent and the Grenadines, Barbados, Saint Lucia, Antigua and Barbuda, some bands from Dominica, Saint Kitts and Nevis, Haiti, Jamaica and the Lesser Antilles.

The nickname of the Trinidad and Tobago national football team, the Soca Warriors, refers to this musical genre.

== Big drum ==
Big drum music is performed throughout the Windward Islands and is especially known in Saint Vincent & the Grenadines. The drums are traditionally made from tree trunks, but are more often made from rum kegs now. The socially aware or satirical lyrics are usually performed by a female singer called a chantwell, and is accompanied by dancers in colorful skirts and headdresses. Big Drum is commonly performed at weddings and other celebrations, especially the launches of boats.

== Calypso ==
Calypso, with its satirical and socio-political lyrics, was developed in the 18th century as a fusion of African and French music styles. It eventually accompanied the rise of steelpan music. Steelpan were imported to Saint Vincent quickly. Calypso's political lyrics have continued to be an important part of the genre. In 1984, a Vincentian musician named Becket released a song called "Horne fug Dem", which helped defeat the ruling party in that year's election.

== Festivals and holidays ==
The Carnival is the biggest holiday in Saint Vincent. It is held in the last week of June and the first of July, and is known on the islands as Vincy mas. Festivities include calypso, soca and steelpan performances, many of them in large, competitive formats.

Other holidays with musical components include the Christmas celebrations, which occur beginning on December 15 and include carolling, concerts and bicycle races. In addition St. Vincent and the Grenadines celebrates the festival “Nine Mornings” and “Nine Nights of Lights”. Union Island holds an annual calypso competition, as well as the Big Drum Festival.

== Popular singers ==
The lead singer from the band Mattafix, known for their hit single "Big City Life", lived in St. Vincent for many years. A multi-platinum popular singer is Kevin Lyttle, whose "Turn Me On" topped charts across Europe. Becket Cyrus is also well known within the island, with his hit "Teaser" earlier on in the country's history. Of the late there have been quite a lot of young and upcoming artists whose music is spreading throughout the Caribbean and the United States. These include Bomani, Skarpyon, and Jamesy P. Some of the Vincentian recording studios are: Skakes Studio, JR Studios, Sky studio, Non-fiction Recordings, Masterroom and Hysyanz. Also, the ever popular Award Winning Soca Artist "MaddZart", who is noted for his collaboration with Kevin Lyttle in the hit song 'Turn Me On' and his most recent launch of the Caribbean Nights Series in NYC, as well as his 2016 songs 'Function', 'Roll Bumper', 'Larger than Life', 'Designated Drinker' and 'All Hands' reaching radio station globally. MaddZart is a repeat winner of the Raga Soca Competition, which is an integral part of the Vincentian Carnival. And now most recently Problem Child has come onto the scene, who in July 2007 became the local carnival Road March winner with his hit song, "Party Animal", which also propelled him to Trinidad and Tobago's 2008 Carnival's Soca monarch finals. Also his brother Skinny Fabulous had a song that took him to Trinidad and Tobago's 2009 Soca Monarch Finals with his song "De Beast Leh Go".
