= Music of Suriname =

The music of Suriname is known for kaseko music, and for having an Indo-Caribbean tradition.

== Kawina ==
Kawina originated around the 1860s, after the abolition of slavery. The vocals are typically call-and-response, and it is accompanied by all kinds of typical Surinamese percussion, such as the skratji.

Like many South American music genres, the rhythm of the kawina originates in Africa. African slaves took their religions, such as Winti, and music with them to Suriname. To dissipate the time, the slaves sung during the work on the plantations, often in a typical pattern of one voice that asks for, and is answered in unison ("call-and-response"). The music was performed so rhythmically that it became a dance. In the beginning, the lyrics were religious.

After abolition of slavery, it became entertainment music, with lyrics that are more socially critical in tone. From then on, kawina is performed by orchestras containing about ten band members, on various Surinamese percussion instruments. Typical instruments are the double-skinned drums, the zigzag or shaker and the kwa-kwa bangi (idiophone). The vocals have always remained in the call-and-response pattern. If a drum kit forms part of the occupation, it is called kaskawi - a subgenre that arises in the 1970s. In the following years, kawina also mixed with other musical genres such as kaseko and rhythm and blues.

== Kaseko ==
The term Kaseko is probably derived from the French expression casser le corps (break the body), which was used during slavery to indicate a very swift dance. Kaseko is a fusion of numerous popular and folk styles derived from Africa, Europe and the Americas. It is rhythmically complex, with percussion instruments including skratji (a very large bass drum) and snare drums, as well as saxophone, trumpet and occasionally trombone. Singing can be both solo and choir. Songs are typically call-and-response, as are Creole folk styles from the area, such as kawina.

Kaseko emerged from the traditional Afro-Surinamese kawina music, which was played since the beginning of 1900 by street musicians in Paramaribo. It evolved in the 1930s during festivities that used large bands, especially brass bands, and was called Bigi Poku (big drum music). In the late 1940s, jazz, calypso and other importations became popular, while rock and roll from the United States soon left its own influence in the form of electrified instruments.

== Maroon music ==
Surinamese Maroons escaped slavery prior to its abolition in 1863, hiding in the dense jungles of the area, and formed communities like the Aluku, Saramaka, Ndjuka, Matawai, Kwinti and Bakabusi Nengre. Their traditional sung stories are called mato, and there are also popular Maroon music genres called aleke and seketi. Traditional dances include awasa, a women's social dance.

== Javanese-Surinamese music ==
Gamelan music

Gamelan music is the well-known Javanese traditional music in Suriname. This type of music is commonly used to accompany dances, songs and scenes. The Gamelan music is originally from Indonesia and it is common in Javanese cultural activities. A Gamelan orchestra generally consists mainly of metallic xylophones, gongs of several sizes and a drum. There are different types of Gamelan orchestras. The most recent development in Suriname's Gamelan music is the inclusion of western musical instrument in a Gamelan orchestra.

Pop Jawa

In modern Javanese music, Pop Jawa has become very mainstream. Pop Jawa consists of western instruments mixed with Javanese vocals.

== Indo-Surinamese music/Baithak Gana ==
Indian music arrived with immigrants from South Asia. This originally included folk music played with dhantal, tabla, sitar, harmonium and dholak, later including tassa drums. Music was mostly Hindu songs called bhajans, as well as filmi. The tan singing style is unique to the Indian community in Suriname and Guyana.

Alioko is also a very popular form of religious music that developed through different cultures and made its way to Suriname. Using drums and forms of guitars they communicate with the spirits and gods through this ( al- ee- ock - oh ) music.

Recorded Indian music in Suriname began with the release of King of Suriname/The Star Melodies Of Ramdew Chaitoe by Ramdew Chaitoe, in 1958. Chaitoe became very popular, and his music, which was religious in nature, left a lasting influence on future performers. However, no one very successful arose following Chaitoe, until 1968, when Dropati released Let's Sing and Dance, an album of folk and religious songs that remains extremely popular.

In 1958, East Indian music finally made its debut on the recording industry with the release of an album of devotional songs, by Ramdew Chaitoe of Suriname. His album titled, King of Suriname and The Star Melodies of Ramdew Chaitoe was quite appropriately named, as it made him a household name with East Indians not just in Suriname, but throughout the Caribbean. Although his songs were religious in nature, the use of the strong beats of the dhantal and dholak, coupled with his own creolised version of Hindi often had many listeners dancing as if it were a pop song. In fact, one song, "Raat Ke Sapna," would go on to become a huge dance hit in the decades to follow.

Although the release of King of Suriname presented a breakthrough for East Indian music, it was quite short lived, as few artists managed to succeed Ramdew Chaitoe in the years to follow. It was not until the 1960s that another Surinamese would catapult East Indian music onto the scene once again. In 1968, a woman by the name of Dropati debuted with an album of traditional wedding songs, titled, Lets Sing & Dance. Once again, although religious in nature, Dropati's songs, much like those of Ramdew Chaitoe, went on to become huge pop hits within the East Indian community. Dropati's epic songs such as "Gowri Pooja" and "Lawa" became such big hits that they firmly secured her name in history as one of the pillars of Indo-Caribbean music (Dropati, 1993). Lets Sing & Dance along with King of Suriname remain two of the best selling East Indian albums of all time, even to this day (Ramdew Chaitoe, 1993). The effects of the release of these two albums were tremendous. Not only did they prove East Indian music as a legitimate art form, but they also united the East Indians of the Caribbean regardless of whether they were Guyanese, Trinidadian, Jamaican or Surinamese. However, these two albums also showed the need for a more popular, non-religious form of East Indian music, one that would combine the high pitched dholak, dhantal & tassa drum beats with the folk and Hindi lyrics that made Lets Sing & Dance and King of Suriname/The Star Melodies Of Ramdew Chaitoe becoming so popular.

Hindustani Classical music in Suriname

With the help of Government of India, the "Indiaase cultureel Centrum" was established under Embassy of India in Paramaribo. Many teachers visited on deputation and promoted Hindustani classical Music. Prof. Kinot, Ms. Sujata, Ut. Md. Sayeed Khan, Mr. Ardhendu Shekhar, Mrs. Rita Bokil and a few more teachers came. Prof. Rajesh Kelkar (from historic Maharaja Sayajirao University of Baroda), while working with the Cultural centre, expanded teaching of music to Nickerie (247 km from capital) and other places with missionary zeal. His efforts took Indian music into interior villages of Suriname. His services were longest in Suriname.

== See also ==
- SuriPop
- Music of Guyana
- French Guiana
