= Goombay =

Musical genre

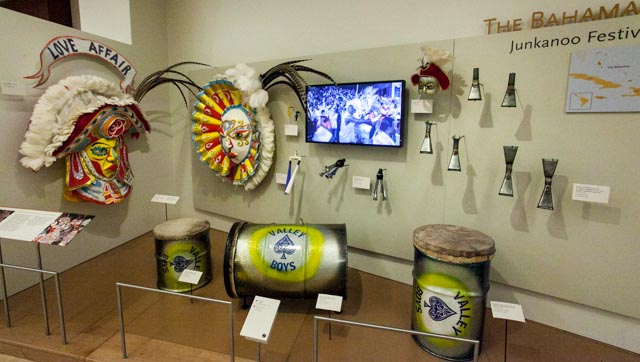
Junkanoo masks and Bahamian musical instruments: three goombays in front (oil cans with skins attached), air horns and cowbells on the wall, are seen.

Goombay is a form of Bahamian music and a drum used to create it. The drum is a membranophone made with goat skin and played with the hands. The term Goombay has also symbolized an event in the Bahamas, for a summer festival with short parades known as ‘Junkanoo’.

The goombay name has also evolved to become synonymous with local Afro-Caribbean music related to calypso. In The Bahamas, its most famous practitioner in modern times was Alphonso 'Blind Blake' Higgs, who performed at the Nassau International Airport for many years.

The Goombay Dance Band help to popularise the musical style in the West in the early 1980s. Their single, "Seven Tears", reached number one in the UK Singles Chart in March 1982.

== Discography ==
Bahamas Goombay 1951 - 1959 (Frémeaux et Associés FA5302, 2011)

== See also ==
- Coconut Grove Goombay Festival, Florida
- Fantasy Fest, Key West, Florida
- Bahamian cuisine (for dishes and beverages named Goombay)
