= Gwo ka =

Antillean Creole term for big drum

- Stylistic origins: West Africa
- Cultural origins: 17th century, Guadeloupe
- Derivative forms: Gwo ka moderne

Fusion genres
- Zouk

Other topics
- Music of Guadeloupe

Gwoka: music, song, dance and cultural practice representative of Guadeloupean identity
- UNESCO Intangible Cultural Heritage
- Country: France
- Domains: Performing arts
- Reference: 00991

Inscription history
- Inscription: 2014 (9th session)
- List: Representative

Gwo ka played in Basse-Terre.

Gwo ka is an Antillean Creole term for big drum. Alongside Gwotanbou, simply Ka or Banboula (archaic), it refers to both a family of hand drums and the music played with them, which is a major part of Guadeloupean folk music. Moreover, the term is occasionally found in reference to the small, flat-bottomed tambourine (tanbou d'bas) played in kadri music, or even simply to drum (tanbou) in general.

The Gwo Ka musical practice emerged in the seventeenth century, during the transatlantic slave trade

Seven simple drum patterns form the basis of gwo ka music, on which the drummers build rhythmic improvisations. Different sizes of drums provide the foundation and its flourishes. The largest, the boula, plays the central rhythm while the smaller maké (or markeur) embellishes upon it, inter-playing with dancers, audience, or singer. Gwo ka singing is usually guttural, nasal, and rough, though it can also be bright and smooth, and is accompanied by uplifting and complex harmonies and melodies. There are also dances that tell folk stories that are accompanied by the gwo ka drums.

In modern, urban Guadeloupe, playing drums is not inextricably linked to dance anymore. But historically, the two practices were inseparable parts of the tradition of léwôz, events held fortnightly on Saturdays near the bigger plantations (payday), and each Saturday of the carnival season in areas of greater land parcelling. Gwoka music was–and still is–played throughout the year in various cultural manifestations such as léwòz, kout’tanbou, véyé and religious events, for example Advent's wake. Today, rural Guadeloupans still gather for léwôz experiences, but a modernized and popularized form of gwo ka exists independently, known as gwo ka moderne.

== History ==
The Gwo Ka musical practice emerged in the 17th century during the transatlantic slave trade, as a result of a creolization process: adaptation to surrounding context and assimilation of European cultural elements. African slaves of Guadeloupe used to gather to play drums, sing and dance. The use of any kind of drum was at that time forbidden by the Code Noir. As a consequence, slaves used a vocal technique called bouladjèl, which imitates drums. At that time, Gwoka practice was directly linked to agricultural work, especially sugar cane, coffee and banana cultivation.

Post 1946, along with anti-assimilation and anti-colonialism movements, Gwoka spread throughout the island, which marks the beginning of its rehabilitation process. As a consequence, in 1988, lawyer and nationalist activist Félix Cotellon created the Festival de Gwoka Sentann in the city of Sainte-Anne without the support of the municipality. Studies and symposiums were held on the occasion.

In 1981, local musician Gérard Lockel published the Traité de Gwoka modên, the first attempt to formalize this musical genre. He claimed that Gwoka was atonal, breaching with western conventions and tastes. By affirming the modality of Gwoka, he situated this music style within the realm of African musical traditions. Paradoxically, under Lockel's leadership, Gwoka was transformed from a participatory music played outdoors to a presentational music played on stage with European and North American instruments.

Musical research show that the instrument can find its roots in the drums and songs of the West African countries (Guinea gulf, Congo...). From the diverse music and dance of their homelands, the slaves elaborated a communication tool, a new form of art, like the creole language: the Gwo Ka. This musical genre is characterised by an African typology: - repetitive form - improvisation - physical movements linked to music - a response between a soloist and choir - a syncopation weak times

== Instruments ==
Traditional gwo ka is ideally played with at least 2 hand drums (ka in créole): 1 boula and 1 makè. Historically, ka were made of:

- a recycled cured meat keg for the body (bari a vyann or bouko in créole);
- a goat skin (po a kabrit in créole) — male for the boula vs. female for the makè;
- tensioning metal hoops (sèk, i.e. circle in créole);
- wooden tensioning pegs (klé in créole);
- rope (zoban in créole).

Often, the Ka section is further accompanied by:

- ti-bwa: 15 to 20 cm wooden sticks drummed on the side of a "Ka" or a section of bamboo culm of about 15 cm in diameter;
- chacha: emptied & dried calabash — or any other container — filled with a granular material (e.g. grains, salt, sand...).

== Rhythms ==
The influences (lifestyle and musical genre) of the "master" combined with this base to create the seven rhythms or dances:

- The léwôz is the war rhythm, used to give rhythm the attacks against the plantations, but was also an incantation dance;
- The kaladja symbolises the struggle in love;
- The toumblak, like the kaladja, deals with the love theme, belly dance, fertility dance;
- The padjabèl is the cane cutting dance;
- The graj accompanies the agricultural work;
- The woulé is the "creole waltz", to charm and mimic the whites;
- The mendé would have been the last rhythm to arrive in the islands, with the "Congos" under contract after the abolition, and symbolises the collective celebration of carnival.

== Dance ==
"Gwo-ka is a dance of improvisation by excellence, a dance of the instinct, of the moment. (…) Gwo-ka, dance of resistance, of resilience and adaptation: Dance of Life"

== Gwo ka moderne ==
A more modernized version of gwo ka is gwo ka moderne, which adds new instruments ranging from conga or djembe drums and chimes to electric bass guitar. At root, however, these styles all use the same fundamental seven rhythms as folk gwo ka. Zouk legends Kassav' played an important role in the modernization of gwo ka, giving urban credibility to a style that was seen as backward and unsophisticated; they initially played in a gro ka format, using songs from the gwo ka Carnival tradition of mas a St. Jean and even placing an homage to traditionalist drumming legend Velo on their earlier albums.

Gwo ka moderne artists include Pakala Percussion, Van Lévé and Poukoutan'n, alongside more pop-influenced musicians like Marcel Magnat and Ti Celeste, while Gerard Hubert and others have fused gwo ka with zouk. The most famous modern gwo ka performer, however, is William Flessel, whose Message Ka in 1994 became an international hit.

In 2013, the Heritage Committee of the Ministry of Culture and Communication has selected the intent to apply of gwoka for registration to the Representative List of the Intangible Cultural Heritage of Humanity in order to enhance the gwoka and organize a network of actors.

In 2014, the Heritage Committee recognized gwoka in the Representative List of the Intangible Cultural Heritage of Humanity.
