= Rake-and-scrape =

Traditional music of The Bahamas

- Stylistic origins: Junkanoo music; Quadrille; Christian hymns; Goombay music
- Cultural origins: 1800s, Bahamas
- Typical instruments: guitar; drums; banjo; accordion; hand saw
- Derivative forms: Goombay

Rake-and-scrape is the traditional music of The Bahamas, alongside Junkanoo. It combines African musical elements with European musical elements to create a sound comparable to other Caribbean music while remaining distinct.

== History ==
=== Claims of Turk and Caicos origins ===
Although it is claimed that rake-and-scrape was introduced to The Bahamas by Turk and Caicos immigrants in the 1920s, the claim has no evidence. In "Sketches of Nassau", by Frank Wilson, published in 1864, he, criticizing the accent of the Black population of Nassau, uses this comparison to express his point: "but the melody of the lute can seldom be heard above the gratings of the rasp and saw".

In the Nassau Times, published on the 6th of April, 1878, an account titled, "Interesting Description of Life and Scenes in the Bahamas", mentions a band playing music for a couple recently married. He states: "we met the musical instruments going to this feast of love. They consisted in of a tom tom, a hollow log and a pipe". The hollow log is referencing a scraping instrument similar to the Guiro of Cuba, or a Rasp as mentioned earlier in 1864 by Frank Wilson. The Pipe is referencing the Fife that would carry the melody role.

These two accounts are 19th-century references to rake-and-scrape in The Bahamas.
