= Music of French Guiana =

The Music of French Guiana (or French Guianan music) is a very rich and varied music of several styles and cultures coming from Europe, Africa and the Americas by the Amerindians due to its history and its multi-ethnic diversity.

== Folk music ==
=== Native music ===
Sanpula, Malaka, etc.

=== Guianan Creole music ===
Kasékò is a musical genre from French Guiana. It also designates the drums as well as the dance of this musical genre. This is a fusion of African, European and American styles.

- Other Creole genres: Kanmougwé (rhythm & dance), Léròl (rhythm & dance), Grajé (rhythm & dance), Grajévals (rhythm & dance), Beliya (rhythm & dance), Labasyou (dance), Ladjanbèl (dance), Kaladja (rhythm & dance).
- Carnival music

Quadrille (and Creole quadrille), Mazurka (and Creole Mazurka), Piké djouk, Valse (and Creole valse), Polka.

=== Maroon music ===
Awassa, mato and soussa are important kinds of Maroon music in French Guiana as well as Suriname. Other rhythms and styles include kawina.

- Aléké is a style of drum-based music that arose in the 1950s. It is similar to salsa music and merengue. The first major group was Salka, followed by major bands like Bigi Ting and Fondering. Modern performers include Bigi Monie (Saint-Laurent), Bigi Libi and Young Clémencia (Grand Santi), Wan Ton Melody and Big Control (Papaïchton), Slave and Bigi Laï (Maripasoula). Historical groups include Pokina and Lagadisssa (from Paramaribo), Clémencia and Alkowa (from Grand Santi), Rasta (from Papaïchton), Tranga Oousel (from Maripasoula), Mabouya (from Apatou), Switi Lobi (from Albina), Sapatia, Lespeki and Africa (from Saint-Laurent du Maroni).
- Bigi poku is a style of dance music in the west of French Guiana and Suriname. It is traditionally played with drums and maracas, although today guitars, keyboards and percussion instruments are used.

Intermix, Tchoutcha, Inter Spoity (Apatou), Multi System and Compress 220v (Saint Laurent), who toured in Europe in 1999, are the main representatives of this style.

== Popular music ==
Dancehall, French hip hop, Zouk, Biguine, Débot & Moulala, etc.
