= Music of Saint Kitts and Nevis =

The Mongoose Play, a popular production of folk theatre and music

The music of Saint Kitts and Nevis is known for a number of musical celebrations including Carnival (December 17 to January 3 on Saint Kitts). The last week in June features the St Kitts Music Festival, while the week-long Culturama on Nevis lasts from the end of July into early August.

In addition, there are other festivals on the island of Saint Kitts. There is Inner City Fest in February in Molineaux Green Valley Festival usually around Whit Monday in the village of Cayon, Easterama around Easter (April) in the village of Sandy Point, Fest-Tab, around July-August in the village of Tabernacle, and La festival de Capisterre, around Independence Day in Saint Kitts and Nevis (19 September), in the Capisterre region. These celebrations typically feature parades, street dances and salsa, jazz, soca, calypso and steelpan music.

The official genre of St. Kitts and Nevis is called Wilders / Wailaz / Jamband Music. It has a similarity to Soca Music (which originated in Trinidad and Tobago) but it is distinctly different in sound and origin. This music can be heard from the local bands which play on both islands during SugarMas, Culturama and other local activities.

== Traditional music ==
The most well-known kind of traditional music is probably seasonal Christmas songs, though there also chanteys and other songs. Music is also a part of the Tea Meetings which are common on the island, featuring a pair of stentorian male singers in a competitive kind of performance in which hecklers play an important role.

== Carnival music ==
Carnival in Saint Kitts and Nevis features music quite prominently. Big Drum and string bands accompany folk performers. Other instruments include shack-shack (a tin can with beads inside), baha (a blown metal pipe), triangle, fife, guitar and quarto.

Iron bands were introduced to Saint Kitts and Nevis' Carnival in the 1940s, when bands used makeshift percussion instruments from the likes of car rims. Ensembles of local, collaborative musicians formed during this era, playing drums, saxophones, bass guitars and trumpets; these included the Silver Rhythm Orchestra, Brown Queen, Music Makers, Esperanza and Rhythm Kings. The following decade saw the introduction a Trinidadian style called steelpan, brought by Lloyd Matheson, C.B.E., then an Education Officer. The first steelpan band was Roy Martin's Wilberforce Steel Pan. Other bands included the Eagle Squadron, Boomerang, Casablanca, Boston Tigers and The Invaders. Modern Carnival in Saint Kitts and Nevis did not begin until the late 1950s. In the 1960s, brass bands dominated first Carnival, then much of popular music.

== Calypso ==
Calypso is a style of music from Trinidad and Tobago, consisting of highly lyrical songs that frequently makes topical comments on the ruling classes and social issues of the day.

During slavery, calypso was used for commentary against the oppression and brutal treatment suffered by the slaves at the hands of their masters. This form was called Caiso (Ka-ee-sow) meaning "the town cry", while the singer/composer was called the "Caisonian". This singing was then nicknamed "calypso" by the European slave masters, who called it after the mythological sea nymph calypso because of its melodic ability to captivate its listeners.

The caisonians were then pressured by their masters to sing songs to entertain them in return for certain privileges and an ease of tasks, and for money during the post-emancipation period.

Calypso was subsequently commercialized in Trinidad, where it was sung mainly for entertainment in shows called "calypso tents" during the Trinidad carnival celebrations. (Unreferenced)

From Trinidad, calypso spread across the Caribbean, and became a major part of Kittitian (or Kittian) and Nevisian music with the introduction of formal calypso competitions in the 1950s. Prominent early calypsonians from this period included Mighty Kush, Lord Mike, Elmo Osborne, Lord Harmony, King Monow and the Mighty Saint. By the 1980s, calypso had begun to peak in popularity on Saint Kitts and Nevis, while the two dominant performers were the rivals Starshield and Ellie Matt (King Richie and son King 'Richie Buntin'.who today are one of the most prolific songwriter and composers.

== See also ==
- Culture of St. Kitts and Nevis
