= Music of Guyana =

The music of Guyana encompasses a range of musical styles and genres that draw from various influences including: Indian, Latino-Hispanic, European, African, Chinese, and Amerindian music. Popular Guyanese performers include: Terry Gajraj, Eddy Grant, Dave Martins & the Tradewinds (Johnny Braff, Ivor Lynch and Sammy Baksh), Aubrey Cummings, Collé Kharis, Nicky Porter and Eddie Hooper. The Guyana Music Festival has proven to be influential on the Guyana music scene.

== History ==
Earliest recorded musical interactions were mainly related to the missionary-driven spread of Christianity in the New World. Moravian missionaries used music used hymns to reach the Kalina people in the area of Berbice. Slaves brought to the region via the Atlantic slave trade contributed African influences from a wide array of different cultures, although music and dance was also utilized to promote fitness in slaves by their sellers. After emancipation, the period in which the British sought to bring indentured labor into the colonies introduced musical traditions of India, as well as Portugal and other countries.

When the colonies of Demerara, Essequibo, and Berbice were merged into British Guiana, colonial power and upper class culture "exerted substantial influence" over music styles of the time. Military bands for parades and ceremonial purpose reflected British sovereignty. Classical music, religious music, or folk songs of Britain were also popular among the ruling class. In the late 19th century, there was "a tendency import artists" as a show of "Victorian culture of respectability".

In marginalized groups, laws were enacted to suppress music, as it was connected to revolts. Nonetheless, music reflecting other cultures flourished within communities such as African-derived music in villages of former slaves and Indian traditions maintained in villages occupied by those under and post-indenture. The British Guiana Militia Band, formed mainly to deal with the unpopularity stemmed from involvement in the Angel Gabriel Riots, served both functions of promoting British Imperialism as well as an apprenticeship program for musicians of the Portuguese Guyanese and Afro-Guyanese working class. Other musical events of the working-class included "practices", a paid-entry dance hall. Genres reflected a mix of African, Irish, and Scottish music traditions and instruments.

In contrast to the Christian-derived music of the colonial elite, bhajans were important to Indo-Guyanese music. Tan singing and folk music accompanied by tassa drums followed instruments such as the harmonium, sitar, tabla, dholak and dhantal. Hindi has given way to English and Caribbean creole languages giving rise to fusion styles such as chutney, which flourished mostly in Trinidad and Tobago during its early years as Guyanese media outlets greatly restrained Indian culture in the 1970s and 80s. In the 90s, just as calypso was developing into Soca, chutney also took on more regional influences such as using the steelpan and electronic instruments.

Calypso music, common among Afro-Caribbean communities, has also been an outlet for criticizing the government or addressing other social issues. Guyana has annual calypso competitions.

== Music education ==
Guyana is home to many unique music traditions, but music has tended to receive little support in schools. Music studies are offered as part of teacher training at Cyril Potter College of Education, and a fledgling National School of Music was opened in 2012.

== Prominent musicians ==
El Sadiek & De Sugar Cake Girls from Guyana was a unique formation of entertainers, singers, dancers and musicians, including the Sugar Cake Girls – Fiona, Sarah and Kamla. El Sadiek's diverse music repertoire included Filmi, Chutney, Soca, Reggae, Hip Hop, and Soul music. El Sadiek lead keyboard player, Shabana, is the only female Indian keyboard player in Guyana and perhaps the Caribbean. El Sadiek also includes the singer Kerida who Chutney and Filmi beats. Other talented lead singers were Sheik and Dj Poopsie.

Guyanese-born musicians who developed their musical careers abroad include Mad Professor (Neil Fraser). Fraser created Ariwa Records in 1979 and became a central figure in the UK dub scene as a prolific producer of dub and an originator of the "Lovers Rock" genre in the early 1980s.

Rapper Central Cee is of British-Guyanese descent.

== See also ==
- Shanto
- Music of the Caribbean
- Guyanese music in the United Kingdom
- Georgetown Seawall Bandstand
- Guyana Defence Force Band Corps
