= Bélé =

Folk dance and music from Dominica and other Caribbean Island nations

- Stylistic origins: West African music
- Cultural origins: Late 17th century, Dominica, Grenada, Guadeloupe, Haiti, Martinique, Saint Lucia, and Trinidad and Tobago
- Typical instruments: Drum; maracas; triangle; tibwa

Fusion genres
- Biguine; chouval bwa; compas; Zouk; bouyon; twoubadou

Other topics
- Music of Martinique; music of Haiti; music of Dominica; music of Saint Lucia

The bélé is a folk dance, drum and music from Dominica, Grenada, Guadeloupe, Haiti, Martinique, Saint Lucia, and Trinidad and Tobago.

== As a dance ==
The bélé dance formed from a combination of traditional African dance styles and Caribbean influences due to the changed landscape, musical instruments, and tumultuous lifestyle. It may be the oldest Creole dance of the creole French West Indian Islands, and it strongly reflects influences from African fertility dances. It is performed most commonly during full moon evenings, or sometimes during funeral wakes (Antillean Creole: lavèyé). In Tobago, it is thought to have been performed by women of the planter class at social events in the planters' great houses, and the dress and dance style copied by the enslaved people who worked in or around these houses .

== As a drum ==
The term bélé also refers to a kind of drum used in some forms of music of Caribbean countries and islands like Dominica, Haiti, Martinique and Saint Lucia.

== Etymology ==
The word bélé may derive from French belle aire, meaning "good air", or from French aire, meaning "threshing platform", or it may further derive from a West African language word.

== History ==
=== Origin ===
In Kitas, the bélé dance had origins in Benin at festivals associated with mating and fertility. A male and female (in Creole, the "Cavalier" and the "Dam") show off their dance skills to the other dancer, hinting at their sexuality in chants led by a "chantuelle" meaning singer, with the refrain or "lavway" given by a chorus of spectators. The cavalier and dam take turns dancing. The cavalier first demonstrates his prowess, then the dam reacts. The cavalier again courts with the dam, and both dance in the wildest part of the bélé.

In the West Indies, the dance incorporated into work and periods of festivity and lamenting. Because the bélé dance ranged through so many diverse occasions and life-events, the dance and music continued to evolve over time from slavery into freedom. The French named the dance "Belaire," or good air, which shortened to bélé.

== Dominica bélé ==
All bélé are accompanied by an eponymous drum, the tanbou bélé (also called tambour bélé or bélé drum), along with the tingting (triangle) and chakchak (maracas).

Bélés start with a lead vocalist (chantwèl), who is followed by the responsorial chorus (lavwa), then a drummer and dancers. Traditional dances revolve around stylized courtship between a male and female dancer, known as the kavalyé (cavalier) and danm (dam) respectively. The bélé song-dances include the bélé soté, bélé priòrité, bélé djouba, bélé contredanse, bélé rickety and bélé pitjé.

On modern Dominica, bélé are primarily performed for holidays and other celebrations, such as Easter, Independence Day, Christmas, Jounen Kwéyòl and patron saint festivals held annually in the Parishes of Dominica, especially in the Fèt St.-Pierre and the Fèt St.-Isidore for fishermen and workers respectively.

== Martinique bèlè ==
The Martinique bèlè is a legacy of the slave music tradition. The bélé itself is a huge tambour drum that players ride as though it was a horse. It is characterized, in its rhythm, by the "tibwa" (two wooden sticks) played on a length of bamboo mounted on a stand to the tambour bèlè. Added to the tambour bèlè and tibwa are the maracas, more commonly referred to as the chacha. The tibwa rhythm plays a basic pattern and the drum comes to mark the highlights and introduce percussion improvisations.

It is organized in a specific way, beginning with the entry of the singer ( lavwa ) and choir ( lavwa Deye or "answer"). Then the "Bwatè" (player ti bwa) sets the pace, followed by bèlè drum. Finally, the dancers take the stage. A dialogue is created between the dancers and the "tanbouyè" (drummer). The "answer" play opposite the singer. The audience can also participate. As a family, together singers, dancers, musicians and audiences are lured by its mesmerizing rhythms. The bèlé song-dances include, bèlé dous, bèlé pitjè, biguine bèlé, bèlé belya, and gran bèlé

The bèlè is the origin of several important Martiniquan popular styles, including chouval bwa and biguine; it also exerted an influence on zouk.

== Saint Lucia bèlè ==
The bèlè tradition of St. Lucia is a form of Creole song and couple dance, performed by one couple with a leader and chorus. They are performed in several contexts, most notably in funeral wakes. Bélè include the bélè anlè, bélè matjé, bélè anlawis and the bélè atè. The bélè anlawis is the only form which is not responsorial.

== Trinidad bélé ==
In the late 18th Century when the French plantation owners came to Trinidad, they brought with them a life style of "joie de vivre" to their plantations. At that time, the French held many balls at the Great Houses where they enjoyed doing many of the courtly dances of Europe.

The house slaves, in their moments of leisure, took the dance to the field slaves and mimicked the dance of their masters. The slaves who worked in or around these houses quickly copied the French style and dress. They showed off by doing ceremonious bows, making grand entrances, sweeping movements, graceful and gentle gliding steps which imitated the elegance of the French. The rhythmic quality of the bélé drums added spicy and yet subtle sensuality to the movements. There are more than 14 types of bélé dances including the Grand bélé and Congo bélé, with each performed to its own rhythms and chants. Female costumes usually have plain underskirts with bright and flowy over skirts. Female costumes may also include headpieces correlating with their overskirts. Male costumes are usually much more simple with slight tributes to the female costumes.

== See also ==
- Biguine
- Bouyon music
- Chouval bwa
- Edmond Mondesir
- Rara music
