= List of Saint Lucians =

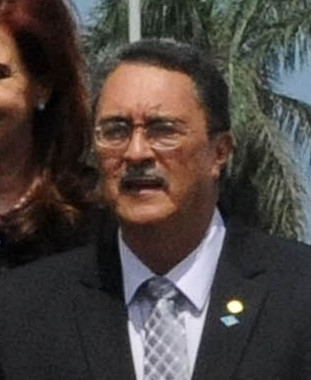
Dr Kenny Anthony, Prime Minister of St Lucia

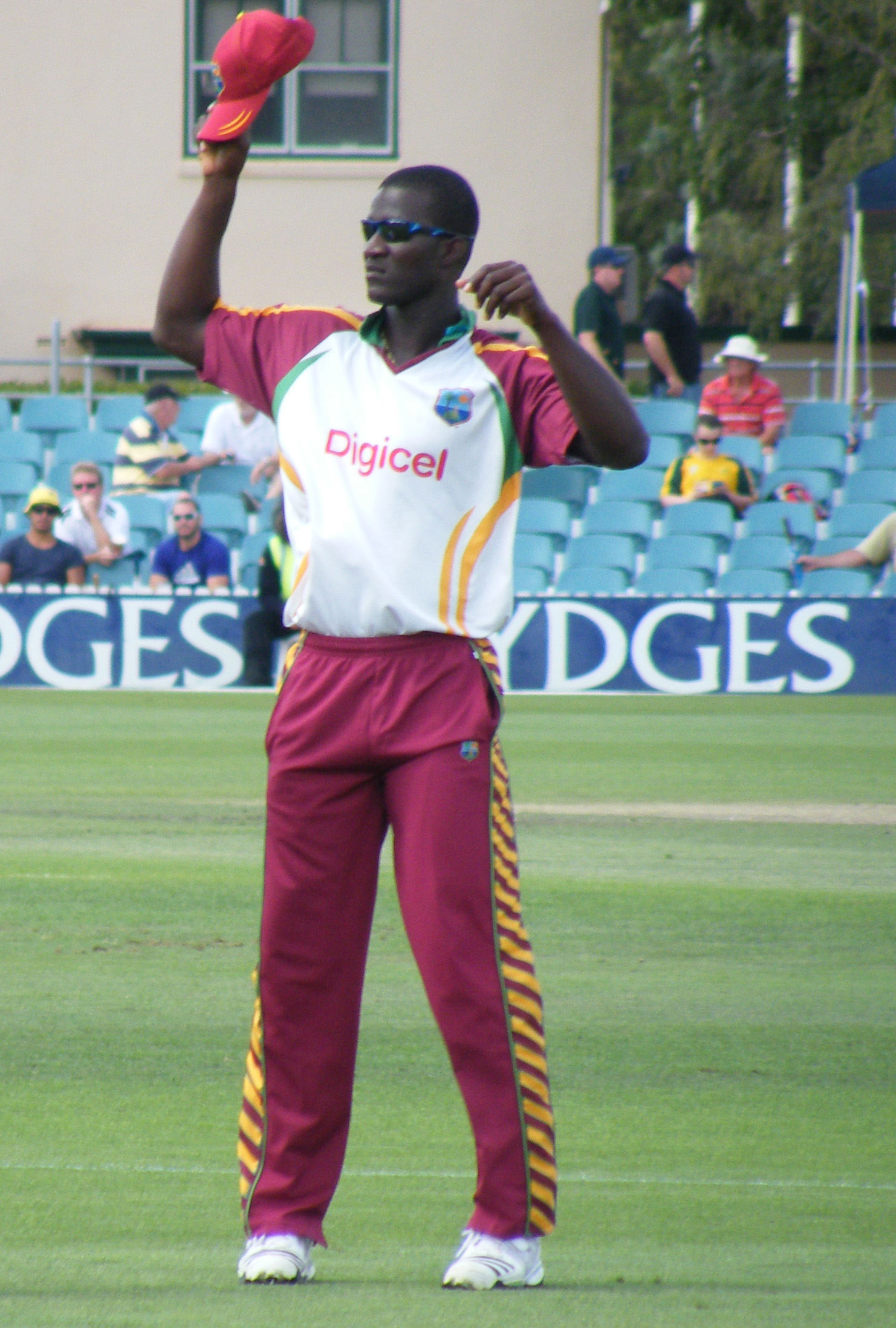
Darren Sammy, International cricketer

This is a list of people from Saint Lucia in the eastern Caribbean.

== A ==
- Makeba Alcide (born 1990) – athlete, born in Castries
- Julien Alfred (born 2001) – athlete
- Pamela Alfred (born 1978) – international cricketer
- Kenny Davis Anthony (born 1951) – Prime Minister of St Lucia, born in Laborie
- Joyce Auguste – musician and leader of The Hewanorra Voices
- Marie Grace Augustin (1897–1996) – businesswoman

== B ==
- Michelle Baptiste (born 1977) – Olympic long jumper, born in St Lucia
- Danielle Beaubrun (born 1990) – Olympic swimmer, born in St Lucia
- Kevin Bertin also known as Monét X Change (born 1990) – drag queen, RuPaul's Drag Race Season 10 contestant and RuPaul's Drag Race All Stars winner
- Chris Boucher (born 1993) – NBA basketball player, born in Castries
- Rufus George Bousquet (born 1958) – politician, cabinet minister, born in St Lucia
- Winston Branch (born 1947) – artist, living in California, born in Castries
- Desmond Brathwaite (died 2022) – politician and government minister

== C ==
- Ignatius Cadette (born 1957) – international cricketer, born in Castries
- Neville Cenac (born 1939) – Foreign Minister of St Lucia, born in Soufriere
- Winston Francis Cenac (1925–2004) – Prime Minister of St Lucia, born in Soufriere
- George Frederick Lawrence Charles (1916–2004) – Chief Minister of St Lucia
- Johnson Charles (born 1989) – international cricketer, born in Castries
- Ryan Charles (born 1986) – St Lucian, British based boxer, mother born in St Lucia
- Allen Michael Chastanet (born 1960) – Prime Minister of Saint Lucia
- Sir Frederick Joseph Clarke (1912–1980) – St Lucia’s first native governor (1967–1973)
- Sir John George Melvin Compton (1925–2007) – Chief Minister of St Lucia, born St Vincent and the Grenadines but raised in St Lucia
- Petrus Compton – politician and government minister

== D ==
- Stephen Dantes (born 1982) – poet and novelist, born in Saltibus, Choiseul
- Suzie Agnes-Ida d'Auvergne (1942–2014) – High Court judge
- Nicole David – soca musician
- Sir Justin Louis Devaux (1884–1943) – lawyer and colonial Chief Justice

== E ==
- Darvin Edwards (born 1986) – high jumper, St Lucian record holder, born in Castries
- Craig Walt Emmanuel (born 1986) – international cricketer, born in St Lucia
- Edmund Estephane (born 1968) – politician, cabinet minister
- Erma-Gene Evans (born 1984) – javelin thrower, born in Castries
- Nathalie Emmanuel (born 1989) – actress, born in England

== F ==
- Verena Marcelle Felicien (born 1964) – women's Test cricketer, born in Castries
- Alvin La Feuille (born 1978) – international cricketer
- Felix Finisterre – politician
- Sir Vincent Floissac (1928–2010) – lawyer and judge, born in St Lucia
- Sarah Lucy Flood-Beaubrun (born 1969) – politician and government minister, born in Desruisseaux
- Emile Ford (born Michael Emile Telford Miller) (born 1937) – singer and musician (Emile Ford and the Checkmates), born in Castries, raised in the Bahamas
- Claudius James Francis (born 1959) – politician
- Hunter J. Francois (1924–2014) – politician and government minister
- Walter Francois – politician
- Richard Frederick (born 1965) – lawyer, politician and government minister, born in Micoud

== G ==
- Louis Bertrand George (1950–2014) – politician and government minister

== H ==
- Cornelius Cyprian Henry (born 1956) – international cricketer (for Canada), born in St Lucia
- Sherri Malaika Ayesha Henry (born 1982) – Olympic swimmer, born in St Lucia
- Ronald "Boo" Hinkson – jazz guitarist, born in St Lucia
- Emma Hippolyte – OBE, politician
- Kendel Hippolyte (born 1952) – poet and playwright, born in St Lucia
- Julian Robert Hunte (born 1940) – politician, foreign minister, born in Castries

== J ==
- Arsene Vigil James (1944) – politician, born in Desruisseaux
- Earl Jude Jean (born 1971) – professional footballer, St Lucian international, born in St Lucia
- Ignatius Jean – politician
- Teddyson John – musician, born in Castries
- Velon Leo John (born 1942) – politician
- Sonia M. Johnny (born 1953) – permanent member of the Permanent Council of the Organization of American States, first woman ambassador to the United States
- Dominic Laurence Johnson (born 1975) – Olympic pole vaulter, multiple St Lucian record holder
- Ezechiel Joseph – politician
- Guy Joseph (born 1966) – politician
- Zepherinus Joseph (born 1975) – middle and long distance runner, St Lucian multiple record holder, born in Mon Repos
- Peter Josie – former politician, born in Vieux Fort
- Didacus Jules (born c.1957) – educator

== K ==
- Jane King (born 1952) – poet, born in Castries
- Stephenson King (born 1958) – Prime Minister of St Lucia, born in Castries

== L ==
- Cyprian Lansiquot – lawyer and politician
- Cecil Lay – politician
- Vernetta Lesforis (born 1975) – Olympic sprinter, born in St Lucia
- Alderman Rowe Nicholas Lesmond (born 1978) – international cricketer, born in St Lucia
- Allen Montgomery Lewis (1909–1993) – Governor-General of St Lucia, born in Castries
- Vaughan Allen Lewis (born 1940) – Prime Minister of St Lucia
- Sir William Arthur Lewis (1915–1991) – economist, Nobel Prize for Economics in 1979, born in Castries
- Sir Allan Fitzgerald Laurent Louisy (1916–2011) – Prime Minister of St Lucia, born in Labourie
- Dame Pearlette Louisy (born 1946) – Governor General of St Lucia, born in Laborie
- Vladimir Lucien (born 1988) – writer, critic and actor

== M ==
- William George Mallet (1923–2010) – Deputy Prime Minister, Governor-General, born Panama and raised in St Lucia
- Gabriel Malzaire (born 1957) – clergyman, Bishop of Roseau, Dominica and Archbishop-elect of Castries, born in Mon Repos
- Joseph Marcell (born 1948) – actor (played Geoffrey the butler in The Fresh Prince of Bel Air), born in St Lucia but moved to England at nine years of age
- Mario Michel (born 1960) – lawyer, high court judge and politician, government minister
- Monét X Change (born 1990) – drag queen and contestant on RuPaul's Drag Race
- Keith Mondesir (born 1948) – politician and government minister, born in Castries
- Peter Lenard Montoute (born 1962) – politician and government minister, born in Gros Islet

== N ==
- Marcus Neill Nicholas (born 1966) – politician

== P ==
- Jamie Peterkin (born 1982) – Olympic swimmer, born in Castries
- Philip Joseph Pierre (born 1954) – Prime Minister of Saint Lucia
- Michael Pilgrim (born 1947) – Acting Prime Minister of St Lucia
- Alain Providence (born 1976) – football manager, ex St Lucia national football team manager
- Dalton Polius (born 1991) – first class cricketer

== R ==
- Menissa Rambally (born 1976) – politician and government minister
- Alvina Reynolds – politician and government Minister for Health, Wellness, Human Services and Gender Relations
- Gale Tracy Christiane Rigobert – politician, born in Micoud
- Lennard Riviere – MP and Attorney-General, from Soufriere
- Ives Heraldine Rock (1933–2012) – politician and government minister

== S ==
- Joy St. Omer (2001/2002–2026) – murder victim who sparked a national debate about capital punishment
- Darren Julius Garvey Sammy (born 1983) – international test cricketer, born in Dugard, Micoud
- Jonel Scott (born 1992) – played in ESPN Rise High School National Basketball Game 2011
- Dame Marie Selipha Descartes, DBE, BEM (1914–2010) – folk singer, known as Sesenne, born in Malgretoute, Micoud
- Anthony Bryan Severin (born 1955) – Ambassador to the United Nations
- Aimran Simmons – musician and pan player
- Joseph Solomon (died 1995) – executed murderer
- Levern Donaline Spencer (born 1984) – high jumper, born in Castries
- Clement Springer – musician and folklorist
- Hilary Stewart (1924-2014) writer and illustrator on the first nations people of northern Canada

== T ==
- Isidore Philip Tisson (1985–2010) – international footballer, shot in New York

== W ==
- Derek Alton Walcott (1930–2017) – poet and playwright, Nobel Prizewinner 1992, born in Castries
- Roderick Walcott (1930–2000) – dramatist, twin brother of Derek Alton Walcott, born in Castries
- Rick Wayne (born Learie Carasco) (born 1938) – bodybuilder, publisher and talk-show host, born in St Lucia
- Boswell Williams (1926–2014) – politician, Governor General, born in St Lucia
- David R. Williams (born 1954) – Harvard University public health sociologist
- Marius Wilson – politician
- Trix Worrell (born 1960) – writer and director, born in St Lucia

== X ==
- Llewellyn Xavier, OBE (born 1945) – artist, born in St Lucia

== Y ==
- Marland Yarde (born 1992) – rugby union player who has played for the English national side, born in St Lucia
