= Music of Saint Lucia =

The music of Saint Lucia is home to many vibrant oral and folk traditions and is based on elements derived from the music of Africa, especially rhythmically, and Western Europe, dances like the quadrille, polka and waltz. The banjo and cuatro are iconic Lucian folk instruments, especially a four-stringed banjo called the bwa poye. Celebratory songs called jwé show lyricism, and rhythmic complexity. The most important of the Afro-Lucian Creole folk dances is the kwadril. Music is an integral part of Lucian folk holidays and celebrations, as well as the good-natured rivalry between the La Rose and La Marguerite societies. There is little Western classical music on Saint Lucia, and the country's popular music industry is only nascent. There are few recording opportunities, though live music and radio remain a vital part of Lucian culture. Popular music from abroad, especially Trinidadian styles like calypso and soca, is widespread.

Music education has long been a part of Lucian public education in the primary school age groups. More recently, it has been introduced to older students, many of whom now participate in String Orchestras, wind ensembles, steelpan bands and other musical enrichment opportunities. There is also a well-known government assisted non-profit music school, the Saint Lucia School of Music. The Ministry of Education sponsors a variety of festivals and other special events. The island is also home to the prestigious Saint Lucia Jazz Festival and the Creole celebration Jounen Kwéyòl.

== Folk music ==
A typical Saint Lucian folk band is based around the fiddle, cuatro, banjo, guitar and chak-chak (a rattle). The banjo and cuatro are regarded as particularly important in Saint Lucian culture, especially the small, four-stringed bwa poye, or skroud banjo. Saint Lucian dances include moulala, faci and comette (a derivative of the minuet); however, the kwadril is increasingly viewed as a national symbol. It is a highly stylized and formalized dance that derives from the European quadrille. Jwé is a more informal form of Lucian folk music, and is performed at dances, wakes and other social events; performers improvise comedic and often biting or lyrics. Music also plays a role in the La Rose and La Marguerite tradition of two rival societies that compete in celebration and form a fundamental part of Lucian culture.

Jwé (play) is a form of rural Lucian folk music associated with beach parties, wakes, débòt dances and full moon gatherings. Jwé is performed as an informal, social event that provide the chance for Lucians to show off their verbal skills, and communicate their comedic, social and political commentaries without offending people. Jwé includes both songs for men and women, both of which can be singers, though most Lucian folk instrumentalists are male. A jwé performance is considered good if the audience participates enthusiastically by clapping, responding to the leader and singing and dancing. Some Lucians avoid jwé altogether because of its sexually raunchy lyricism and atmosphere; nevertheless, elements of jwé have entered mainstream Lucian culture, such as the use of lang dévivé, or saying the opposite of what is meant.

Musical elements of jwé include gém (game song), listwa (storytelling), jwé chanté (sung songs) and jwé dansé (song-play-dance). These forms are united by their use of the Creole language, their use of call-and-response singing between a leader and a chorus, with the exception of listwa, and the use of improvisation. Jwé chanté and listwa are purely vocal styles with no accompaniment, nor any traditional dance; the other two are typically accompanied by a ka drum or sometimes the tibwa percussion sticks, which provides a rhythm for dancers.

Sung jwé, jwé chanté or chanté kont, is mostly part of the funeral wake tradition. A jwé chanté leader uses pantomime to enact scenes from a story, or sometimes just the ribald double entendres from it. The gém (game song) are based around a leader who uses his own flourishes on a choreographed dance and improvises witty lyrics, while the audience participates in the performance. Jwé dansé includes four traditional dances. The solo is a couple dance, and the débòt, yonbòt and jwé pòté are all circle dances. The blòtjé is a musical movement found in all jwé dansé styles, occurring, for example, every four beats in the débòt dance.

=== Kwadril ===
Quadrille is a Lucian Creole folk dance derived from the European quadrille. It is performed primarily at private parties which are organized by a host in a private home or rented hall, with musicians paid by the host. Kwadrils are held throughout the year, except during Lent. The modern kwadril has declined in popularity; it had come to be seen as a symbol of colonialism around the time of independence, and was shunned as old-fashioned and out-of-date. More recently, some aspects of Lucian society have come to promote the quadrille as a symbol of Lucian culture. Quadrilles are unlike other Lucian dances in that they must be memorized and choreographed, with only slight room for personal interpretation and improvisation. Learners act as a sort of apprentice for more established performers. A successful performance brings respect and prestige for all participants who dance the correct steps which are traditionally said to "demonstrate control over behavior, manner, and skills" and "symbolize... a set of special values linked with a higher social class".

Kwadril music is provided by an ensemble consisting of a four-stringed instrument, the cuatro (instrument), a rattle, the chakchak, bones called zo, a violin, banjo (skroud, bwa pòyé), mandolin and guitar. A kwadril consists of five separate dances: the pwémyé fidji, dézyèm fidji, twazyèm fidji, katwiyèm fidji (also avantwa or lanmen dwèt) and gwan won (also grande rond). The musicians may also use a lakonmèt (mazurka), schottische or polka; the lakonmèt, also called the mazouk, is especially popular and is the only closed couple dance which originated in Saint Lucia.

=== La Rose and La Marguerite ===
La Rose and La Marguerite are rival societies that commemorate the Anglo-French heritage of the island; the factions represent the warring colonial powers, between whose hands Saint Lucia changed fourteen times. La Rose is held on August 30 while La Margurite is held on October 17. The societies date back to the early 19th century, when each village was home to competing organizations of the Roman Catholic Church. Both societies draw on English royalty traditions and have a number of positions, including the King, Queen, Prince, Princess and various lower titles like the Chief of Police and nurse. La Rose and La Marguerite meet once weekly except during Lent. At these meetings, which are on Saturday for La Rose and Sunday for La Marguerite, members sing or play instruments and dance. La Marguerite meetings feature the membership in a seated chorus with a leader, the chantwèl, standing, while La Rose meetings include instruments like the tanbouwen (tambourine), baha (wooden trumpet), chakchak (rattles), guitar and gwaj (scraper).

The celebrations of both groups differ in that La Rose, the "English" faction, is characterized by noisiness, movement, participation, rhythm and exuberance, while La Marguerite, the "French" faction, is characterized by melody, discipline and restraint. There is a vibrant tradition of women singing factional songs related to this rivalry. Traditions common to both factions include the Omans, a sort of waltz, Marches and the duple rhythm manpa (or maynan) dance. Kwadril and lakonmèt are also performed by La Rose.

=== Other traditional styles ===
In addition to jwé and other music performed for entertainment, Saint Lucia is also home to styles used only for specific occasions. These include work songs, drinking songs, funereal music and serenades and masquerades. The latter two traditions are nearly extinct in modern Saint Lucia. The masquerade was a celebration held near holidays like Easter and New Year's Day, which included an orchestra consisting of a tanbou tenbal, chakchak and a bamboo flute. This same ensemble also traditionally performs for cockfights, merry-go-rounds and vocal serenades, called séwinal in Lucian Creole.

The most widespread form of Lucian work song is the chanté siay, which accompanies the sawing of wood. The vocals are performed by a lead singer and two responding singers, accompanied by a ka and tibwa duo. Both instruments are played in an atypical manner. The ka drum is played on the ground rather than upright, and the tibwa percussion sticks are struck against a bamboo or wooden stick rather than the rim of a drum.

Lucian drinking songs are the chanté abwè, which are rarely performed in recent years. Their traditional context, however, is the wibòt celebration, held during Christmas time. Chanté abwè are performed in a game in which the singers, seated at a long table, take turns singing a new song each time their turn comes. Those who lasted the entire evening won prizes, often a bottle of rum.

=== Bèlè ===
The bélè tradition is a form of Creole song and couple dance, performed one couple with a leader and chorus. They are performed in several contexts, most notably in funeral wakes. Bélè include the bélè anlè, bélè matjé, bélè anlawis and the bélè atè. The bélè anlawis is the only form which is not responsorial.

==== Funeral music ====
On Saint Lucia, wakes are held on the first and eighth night after a person has died, in contrast to other Caribbean islands, which hold their wakes on the first and ninth days. Wakes often include music, such as the singing of hymns and drumming. Traditional music for wakes is performed both inside and outside of the deceased's house. The mourners inside the house sing from a repertoire of songs that are in English and not French Creole, because they are derived from the English-using songs of Lucian churches. The songs include both hymns and sankeys (gospel songs), and are generally responsorial, led by a male singer with the slow, unsyncopated responses of the chorus in unison. The mourners outside the house traditionally perform drumming and a kind of responsorial song performed in Creole and without accompaniment, called kont. These songs often related to the death of the deceased, and may deal with the cause of death, the last words or events surrounding the death. Mourners also dance to both the débòt and bélè, accompanied zo or tibwa and ka.

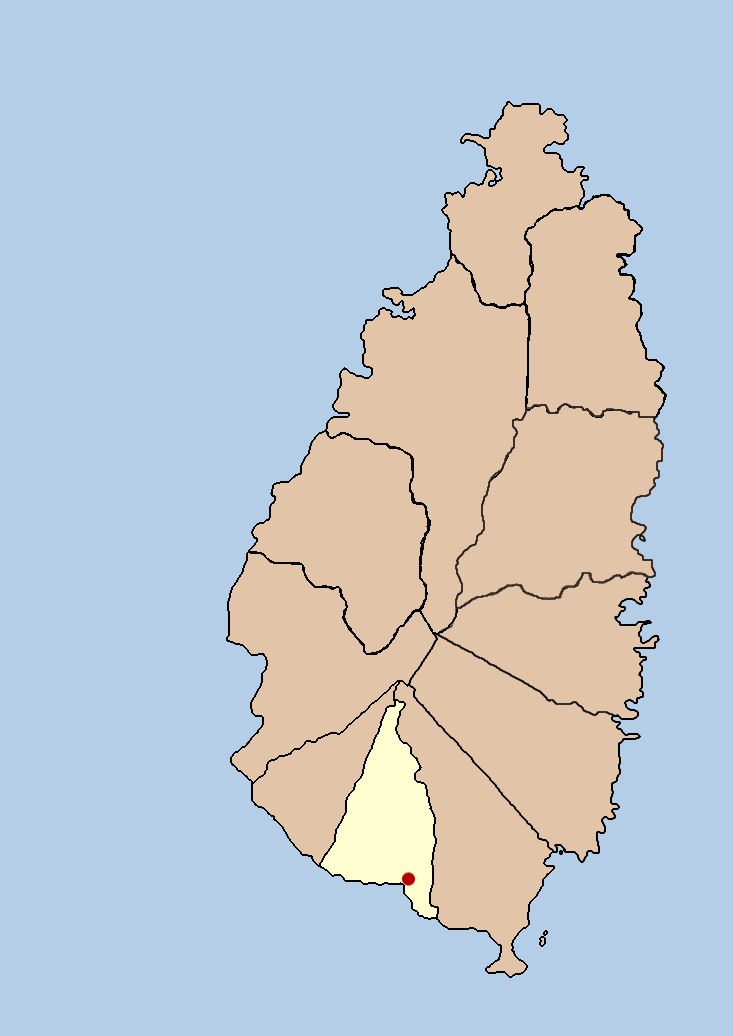
Location of Laborie, a village known for the koutoumba tradition

The villages of La Grace, Piaye and Laborie in the southwest area of Saint Lucia were known for a unique song-dance called the koutoumba. The koutoumba was only performed for the death of a djiné, a person descended from Africans who came to the island in the middle of the 19th century. The koutoumba is unique among Lucian folk dance in that it is performed by a sole dancer and using only two to four lines of text, which is evocative of the song's atmosphere rather than narrative. The last drummer who knew this tradition died in 1986.

==== Kélé ====
Kélé is an Afro-Lucian religious tradition from the Djiné people of the Babonneau region. Only one family, from Resina, in modern Saint Lucia claims to have the religious authority to perform and pass on the kélé rituals. Kélé is based around three deities, Eshu, Shango and Ogun, and is similar to the Nigerian Ogun festival. Kélé's rituals involve contacting one's ancestors to ask for protection, especially "good crops, good health, and good fortune". Kélé has been underground for much of its history, and was only accepted by the Lucian Roman Catholic Church in the early 1960s.

Kélé rituals are accompanied by the drumming of the tanbou manman (mother drum) and the tanbou ich (child drum), which play four different rhythms at specified moments; these are the adan, èrè, koudou and kèré rhythms. Kélé rituals also include singing and dance, as well as feasting, praying to Ogun and the other gods, the smashing of the calabash to appease Eshu at the end of the ceremony, the display of tools made of iron and steel to honor Ogun, and smooth stones to represent Shango, who also receives a ceremonially cleansed sacrificial ram.

== Popular music ==
Lucian popular music can be traced back to the 1940s, when calypso became a part of the island's musical culture. Calypso is a lyrical Trinidadian genre, related to several styles found through the Antillean music area. Music scholar Jocelyne Guilbault has called calypso the primary way modern Lucians "express social commentary". Along with calypso, Lucia has also imported the Trinidadian steelband and soca traditions.

Some Lucian calypsonians recorded in the 1980s, mostly on 45-RPM discs which remain largely unavailable today. The Lucian music industry is quite small scale, due to the island's small market, its lack of recording studios and record producers, the widespread bootlegging of cassettes, and the general unavailability of funding for musical ventures. Saint Lucia is home to several radio stations including Radio St. Lucia and Radio Caribbean International, which play a variety of popular music; since 1989, St Lucian radio stations have played an increasing number of programs about Lucian culture and in the local Creole tongue.

Modern Saint Lucia has produced a few popular musicians in various styles, but is most closely associated with calypso music. Popular Lucian musicians include Tru Tones, Rameau Poleon, Prolifik, Disturbing Joan and Aimran Simmons. Marie Selipha Sesenne Descartes (known simply as "Sesenne") was named Dame Commander of the Order of the British Empire for her work as a chantwelle and in the promotion of Saint Lucian traditional culture and music. Saint Lucian folk dance and theater includes flower dances, masquerades and the Papa Djab festival; various kinds of music are associated with these celebrations.

=== Roots revival ===
In 1969, three Saint Lucians (Eric Brandford, Primrose Bledman and Charles Cadet) collected numerous folk songs for a presentation at the 1969 Expo in Grenada and then again at Guyana's 1973 Carifesta. Two major folk groups emerged; they were The Helenites (led by Clement Springer) and Joyce Auguste's The Hewanorra Voices. Auguste later introduced folk music into Saint Lucian music education. By the end of the 1980s, music and other aspects of Lucian culture was an integral part of the Lucian education system.

In the time leading up to independence from the United Kingdom in 1979, Saint Lucia underwent a profound political and cultural awakening and roots revival which drew on the rise of the black consciousness movement of the United States, the influence of the Caribbean Ecumenical Consultation for Development on local culture and the loosening of restrictions from the powerful Roman Catholic Church on non-Christian cultural elements. Since 1973, the non-government organization Folk Research Centre which seeks to "promote research into St. Lucian culture" and to "explore and clarify the role of culture in the development of our people".

=== Bouyon soca ===
Bouyon soca typically blends old bouyon music rhythms from the 90s' and soca music. In recent years Bouyon soca has become popular in the island of Saint Lucia. Saint Lucian artist Ricky T released a song "Pressure boom" in 2007 which blended the two genres and became very popular throughout the English speaking Caribbean.

This style of bouyon is mostly, but not exclusively, produced in Saint Lucia.

== Government and industry ==
The government has seen value in promoting a music industry, and has formed the Cultural Development Foundation (CDF) the statutory body given responsibility for preservation and promotion of Saint Lucian culture and arts, to accomplish this goal. In 1979, the first-ever M&C Fine Arts Awards were given by Minvielle & Chastanet Ltd, to Saint Lucian artists as an Independence Gift to the Nation; in the early 2000s, this event was handed over to the newly formed Cultural Development Foundation and is now run as the National Arts Festival. The Folk Research Centre has been a prominent part of Lucian cultural research since 1973, and has also published the journal Lucian Kaiso, devoted to Lucian calypso, since 1990. The island's calypso traditions are also celebrated at the annual kaiposium (a kaiso symposium), held since 1987. The island's music industry remains little-known internationally and of small economic importance. The government of Saint Lucia has worked with the OECS to promote the regional music industry through intellectual property law and sponsoring festivals and other activities.

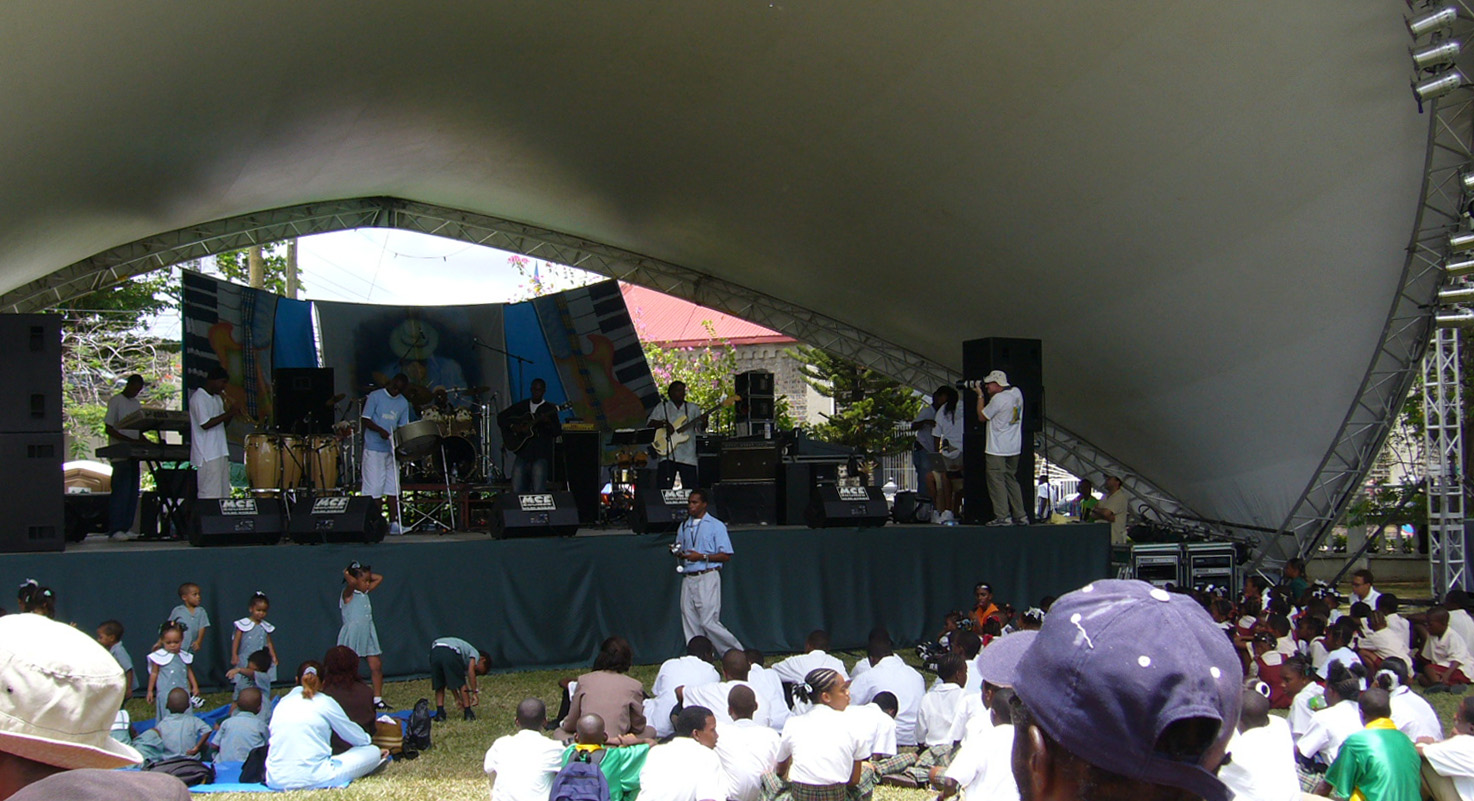
Saint Lucia Jazz Festival in Castries

The most important festival in modern Lucian culture is the Jounen Kwéyòl (International Creole Day) held annually on October 28 since 1983. The Jounen Kwéyòl is sponsored by the Bannzil Kwéyòl, an international organization. Lucian activities are run by the Folk Research Centre in conjunction with the National Research and Development Foundation and the Mouvman Kwéyòl Sent Lisi (St. Lucia Creole Movement). Lucian law protects the owners of intellectual property, such as songwriters, through the Copyright Act of 1995; copyrights are administered by the Hewanorra Musical Society.

There is also a Saint Lucia Jazz Festival that is a major attraction, and a well-known part of the local music scene. It has been an annual event for fifteen years, and has hosted a variety of jazz stars, in addition to local talent. The 2005 festival was a boost for the local music industry, netting $46 million. The Festival is sponsored by a number of corporations and groups, perhaps most significantly BET.

== Education ==
Music is a part of the curriculum at public schools in Saint Lucia; it has long been taught in younger grade levels, but was only introduced to secondary education in 1999. Primary education on Saint Lucia, music and other artistic education is commonly used incidentally to teaching other subjects or for special occasions. About 40% of the island's schools engage in general music education, while others spent more time on general group singing or choir, or recorder ensemble performance. In 2003, a string program was instituted for primary students.

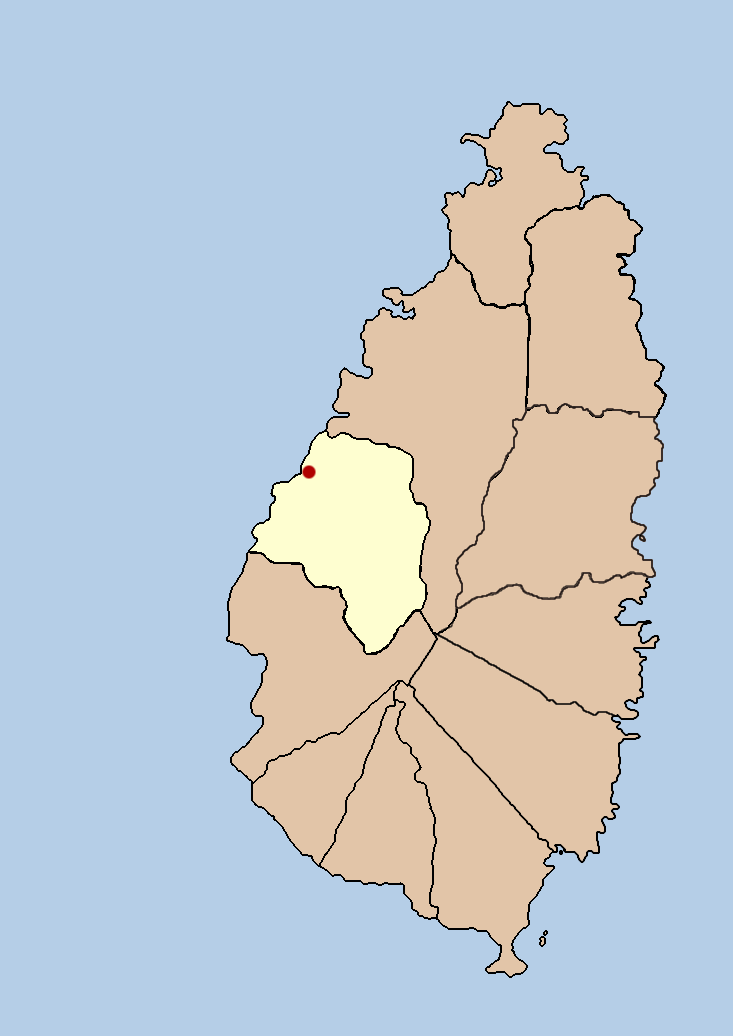
Location of the Education Centre at Anse La Raye

About 70% of schools teach music at the lower secondary level. Many of the schools that do not normally instruct in music may offer volunteer clubs or other more informal opportunities for musical enrichment. Many Lucian schools have formed ensembles, most commonly a wind ensemble (30% of schools), or a steelpan band (20%) or combo group (20%). The public education field has also collaborated with the Saint Lucia School of Music to form the National Youth Choir, String Orchestra and Secondary Schools Wind Ensemble. The governmental Ministry of Education also sponsors a number of festivals and musical special events, both for the benefit of all students and the enrichment of the musically-gifted among them.

The Saint Lucia School of Music is an independent institute of music education that has two branches on the island, one in the north and one in the south. It was established in 1987, and has a student body of around four hundred students. The School's professed goal is to provide music education at all levels, to offer community opportunities for musical enrichment, to facilitate the training and professional development of educators, and to establish the school as a musical resource. There is also a notable music Education Centre operated by a vocal group from the fishing village Anse la Raye; this Centre provides music education opportunities for gifted and underprivileged children from across the island.
