= Music of the former Netherlands Antilles =

The music of the former Netherlands Antilles is a mixture of native, African and European elements, and is closely connected with trends from neighboring countries such as Venezuela and Colombia and islands such as Puerto Rico, Cuba, Santo Domingo, Haiti, Martinique, Trinidad, Dominica, and Guadeloupe. The former Netherlands Antilles islands of Curaçao and Aruba are known for their typical waltzes, danzas, mazurkas and a kind of music called tumba, which is named after the conga drums that accompany it.

The remaining islands are much smaller than Aruba, Bonaire, and Curaçao. They are Sint Eustatius, Sint Maarten and Saba. Sint Eustatius has little nightlife, with only one nightclub (the zouk Largo Height Disco) as of 1996. The inhabitants, "Statians", hold impromptu street dances called "road blocks", using booming car stereos. Saba has a number of dances at various restaurants, including a wide variety of hip hop, calypso, soca, kompa, zouk, bouyon, reggae and merengue. Sint Maarten has a well-known Carnival tradition featuring music and dance, held in mid-April and culminating in the traditional burning of King Moui-Moui, as well as a number of nightclubs and casinos featuring music; popular "spots" where locals go to dance include Boo Boo Jam and Lago Height, both located on the northern (French) part of Sint Maarten; the most popular recent casino band is King Bo-Bo, known as the "King of Calypso".

== Music of the Colonial Legacy and Cultural Synchronicity ==
Colonial past provided the foundation for the Netherlands Antilles' musical identity. Spain conquered the islands in the 16th Century and brought Catholicism and the Iberian languages with them to the Caribbean. With the establishment of the Dutch West India Company in the 17th Century on the islands, European Colonization and Ethnic Capitalism created a stratified society, with the European and Sephardic Jewish elites dominating trade and culture, while the larger population, descended from Africans, was placed in bondage by force and subjected to harsh conditions of labour. For example, Curaçao became a major slave-transfer center (but not a plantation economy), with 500,000 enslaved Africans being transferred through the islands from the 17th to the 19th Century, however there were only a few thousand of those on the island at any given time.

The Papiamentu (Papiamento) language is one of the key results of creolization in this region. Papiamentu, based on both Spanish and Portuguese, has Dutch, African and Indigenous roots and was the primary spoken language of the people of Aruba, Bonaire and Curaçao. It has historically served as the primary language of Afro-Caribbean peoples and provided a way to express oral tradition, folklore and eventually pop music. While under Dutch rule, the language was the second preferred language behind Dutch, and formal recognition did not come until the last few decades. Dutch colonialism offered a leg up to local people, including their language. Despite this dominance, Papiamentu has endured and is now used as a way for Caribbean people to express their culture and resist. Most of the traditional Caribbean music, including carnival songs and festival speeches, is composed in Papiamentu; thus setting it apart from that of music produced by European countries.

European musical customs were brought by colonizers and missionaries to the Caribbean. By the twentieth-century, people from many different backgrounds, but mainly educated Creoles (mixed people), were composing waltzes, polkas, mazurkas, danzas, and other European-style salon dances. Curaçao especially developed a refined classical music tradition. Among those composers was Jan Gerard Palm (1831–1906), who is often referred to as the musical "patriarch" of Curaçao; he and his contemporaries combined many Western elements with Caribbean influences in numerous works for piano and string ensembles. Those works were often the backdrop at various social gatherings or plantation salon events, not solely as copies of European works, but because they were recognized to have gone through a process of "creolization" through the usage of lively European harmonic structures mixed with syncopated rhythms and phrases derived from the African and local aesthetic. The "Creole waltz" in Curaçao is a localized adaptation of the genre of music. Therefore, the emergent musical identity of the islands' bourgeois and upper classes derives from the combination of both the aesthetic interest found in the Old World and the creative diversity of the New World. Many of the genres commonly composed in the Caribbean, such as the above-mentioned waltzes, marches, and even religious (i.e. church or synagogue) music have been preserved as part of the broader cultural history of the Netherlands Antilles.

== Language, Cultural Meaning, and Papiamento in Aruban Calypso ==
In Aruba, Calypso reveals the island's eccentric and linguistic unification. Aruban Calypso music, specifically during Carnival, expresses liberty and equality which brings people together to create a shared sense of unity. Using Papiamento, the creole language of the island, musicians share stories, humor, and community pride that celebrates Aruban culture. Researchers highlight that the use of Papiamento in performance enhance cultural meaning making it easier for local people to understand. Calypso has been able to function as a space where their language is embraced and cherished.

== Modern Aruban music ==
Music is very closely connected to the Aruban culture, and plays a major role in holidays, carnivals and informal celebrations. Carnival music originated in Trinidad in the late 18th century, and combines romantic themes, calypso-inspired tunes, and drums from tumba. Other Aruban celebrations that are based around music include Dera Gai, Dande, Gaita and Aguinaldo.

== Community Storytelling and Social Roles of Calypso in Aruba ==
Aruban Calypso is a tool that is used to tell a story. Through storytelling, humor, and satire it functions as a medium to convey social experiences, social and political issues, and island pride. Performances during Carnival explore political and social issues, while fostering shared cultural meanings that strengthen community bonds. This combination of entertainment and significant narrative strengthens the, "One Happy Island" image while also preserving Calypso as the primary framework for local expression and storytelling.

== Traditional music on Bonaire ==
The island of Bonaire is known for an array of dances, including the Bari and Simadan. Imported polka, carioca, rumba, merengue, danza, joropo, jazz waltz and mazurka are also popular. The Baile di Sinta is a popular fertility dance, performed around a maypole. Traditional African work songs on Bonaire evolved over time into ritual songs with complex dances, instrumentation and polyphony.

The Bari, performed during the festival of the same name, as well as at other times, is led by a single singer who improvises lyrics commenting on local events and figures (such a singer is similar to a calypsonian). Confusingly, the Bari dance, which is performed during the Bari festival, is accompanied by a bongo-like drum called a Bari. The first part of the dance features men competing in a stylized, ritual dance for women, followed by a part where the couples dance, though they don't touch (it is similar to tumba).

After the sorghum harvest in February through April, the Simadan festival is held to celebrate, with the wapa, a rhythmic, shuffling dance, accompanying the celebration. Simadan's traditional songs include three call-and-response forms, the Dan Simadan, Belua and Remailo. These use instruments including the bari, wiri, karko, quarta, guitar, triangle and clapping.
