= List of ambassadors of the Republic of China to Saint Lucia =

Taiwanese diplomatic envoys

Coordinates: 14.076485°N 60.953255°W

Ambassador of Republic of China (Taiwan) to Saint Lucia
- 中華民國駐聖露西亞大使
- Incumbent; Peter Chia-Yen Chen since August 10, 2020
- Inaugural holder: Wang Meng-hsien
- Formation: May 2, 1984

The Republic of China (Taiwan) ambassador in Castries is the official representative of the Government in Taipei to the Government of Saint Lucia. There was a representative of the Government in Beijing to the Government of Saint Lucia between 1997 and 2007 (see List of ambassadors of China to Saint Lucia).

== List of representatives ==
Term start	Ambassador	Chinese language zh:中国驻圣卢西亚大使列表	Observations	Premier of the Republic of China	Prime Minister of Saint Lucia	Term end
May 8, 1984			The Republic of China and St Lucia simultaneously declared 11 April that they would establish diplomatic relations.	Yu Kuo-hwa	John Compton	
May 2, 1984	Wang Meng-hsien	王孟顯		Yu Kuo-hwa	John Compton	
1989	Liu Po-lun	zh:刘伯伦		Lee Huan	John Compton	1992
1992	Lin Tsun-hsien	林尊賢		Hau Pei-tsun	John Compton	1994
1994	Steve Chi-Ming Hsu	徐启明		Lien Chan	John Compton	August 1997
April 25, 2007			The governments in Taipei and Castries reestablished diplomatic relations.	Chang Chun-hsiung	Stephenson King	
April 1, 2007	Tom Chou	周台竹	The relationship between Taiwan and St. Lucia is complicated by the so-called Red Envelope Affair, in which the Taiwanese ambassador allegedly distributed $37,000 to each UWP candidate before the 2011 election.	Chang Chun-hsiung	Stephenson King	
2012	James Chang	章計平		Sean Chen (politician)	Kenneth Anthony	
October 2, 2015	Ray H.W. Mou	zh:牟華瑋		Mao Chi-kuo	Kenneth Anthony	
March 30, 2017	Douglas Cheng-Tsung Shen	沈正宗		Lin Chuan	Allen Chastanet	
August 10, 2020	Peter Chia-Yen Chen	陳家彥		Su Tseng-chang	Allen Chastanet	
