= Jonel =

Jonel is a masculine given name, a variant of the given name John. Notable people with the name include:

- Jonel Carcueva (born 1995), Filipino cyclist
- Jonel Désiré (born 1997), Haitian footballer
- Jonel Perlea (1900–1970), Romanian conductor
- Jonel Scott (born 1992), American basketball player

== See also ==
- Joner
- Jones (surname)
