= Dantes =

Dantes may refer to:

- Dante's, a nightclub in Portland, Oregon, United States
- The United States Armed Forces' Defense Activity for Non-Traditional Education Support program
- The Dantes, an American garage rock band

== People with the surname ==
- Dingdong Dantes (born 1980), Filipino actor
- Georges-Charles de Heeckeren d'Anthès, French military officer who killed Alexander Pushkin
- Roland Dantes (1940–2009), Filipino actor, bodybuilder and martial artist
- Stephen Dantes, Saint Lucian writer
- Volodymyr Dantes (born 1988), a Ukrainian media personality and musician

== People with the given name ==
- Dantes Diwiak, German opera singer
- Dantes Tsitsi (born 1959), Nauruan politician

== Fictional characters ==
- Edmond Dantès, a title character and the protagonist of Alexandre Dumas, père's 1844 adventure novel The Count of Monte Cristo
