= Kaiso (disambiguation) =

Kaiso is a type of music popular in the Caribbean.

Kaiso may also refer to:

- Kaiso (gene) or ZBTB33, which encodes the protein transcriptional regulator Kaiso
- Kaiso, Uganda, a settlement in Hoima District

== See also ==
- Kaiso Stories, a 2010 jazz album by Other Dimensions In Music
- Lucian Kaiso, a journal of The Folk Research Centre of Saint Lucia
