= Ernest Hilaire =

Saint Lucian politician

The Right Honourable Ernest Hilaire MP
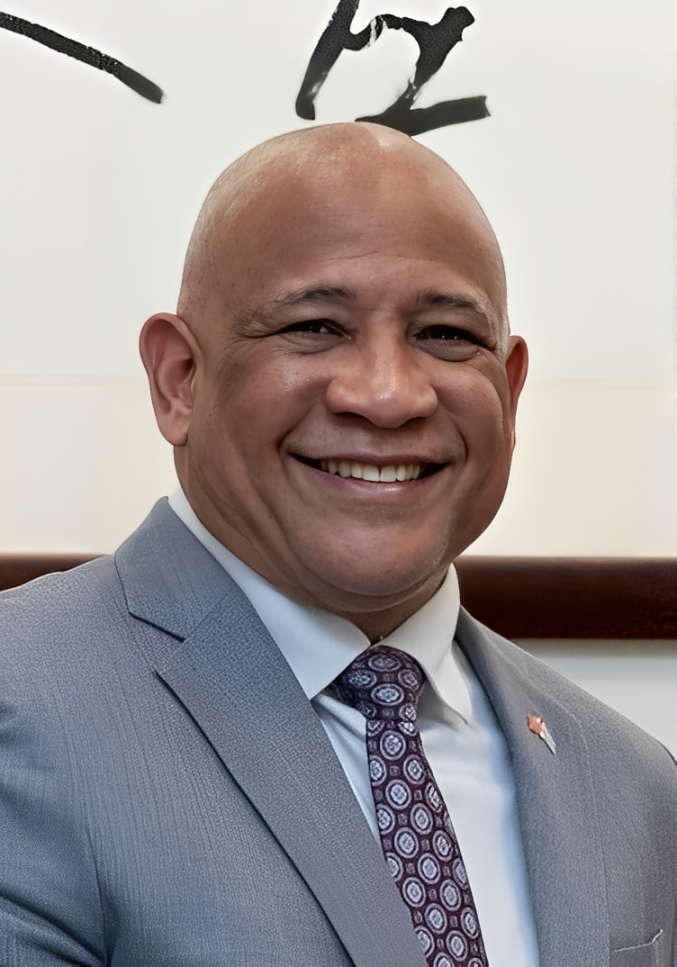
- Hilaire in 2025

11th Deputy Prime Minister of Saint Lucia
- Incumbent
- Assumed office 7 January 2022
- Prime Minister: Philip J. Pierre
- Preceded by: Philip J. Pierre (2016)

Minister for Tourism, Investment, Creative Industries, Culture and Information
- Incumbent
- Assumed office 5 August 2021
- Prime Minister: Philip J. Pierre

1st Deputy Leader of the Saint Lucia Labour Party
- Incumbent
- Assumed office 28 September 2019
- Leader: Philip J. Pierre
- Preceded by: Position established

Member of the Parliament
- Incumbent
- Assumed office 6 June 2016
- Preceded by: Robert Kennedy Lewis
- Constituency: Castries South

Personal details
- Party: Saint Lucia Labour Party
- Education: University of the West Indies at Cave Hill, Darwin College, Cambridge, London School of Economics and Political Science
- Website: https://ernesthilaire.com

Ernest Hilaire is a Saint Lucian politician who is Deputy Prime Minister and Minister for Tourism, Investment, Creative Industries, Culture and Information. Hilaire also serves as the 1st Deputy Political Leader of the Saint Lucia Labour Party. Hilaire serves in the House of Assembly as the representative for Castries South. Hilaire is the former High Commissioner to the United Kingdom for Saint Lucia. He served in opposition from 2016 till the landslide victory of the Saint Lucia Labour Party in the 2021 general election.

== Education ==
In the 1990s Hilaire obtained a Bachelor of Science degree at the Cave Hill campus of the University of the West Indies. Hilaire made the decision to move from a strictly Sociology major to a double major in Political Science and Sociology. Hilaire served one year as a Foreign Service Cadet and went on to achieve his Master of Philosophy Degree in 1995 with a distinction in International Relations from Darwin College, Cambridge University, England. Hilaire also obtained a PhD from London School of Economics in 2006 with a thesis titled International relations and the shaping of state-societal relations – A postcolonial study.

== Post career ==
Hilaire served as the permanent secretary in the Ministry of Youth and Sports in 1999. Hilaire became the chief executive officer of The West Indies Cricket Board (WICB) on 1 October 2009. He would later leave the post to obtain a diplomatic posting in London in September 2012.

Hilaire was appointed deputy prime minister on 7 January 2022.
