= List of ambassadors of Saint Lucia to the United States =

Coordinates: 38.933191°N 77.085933°W

Ambassador of Saint Lucia to United States Caribbean Chancery in Washington, D.C.
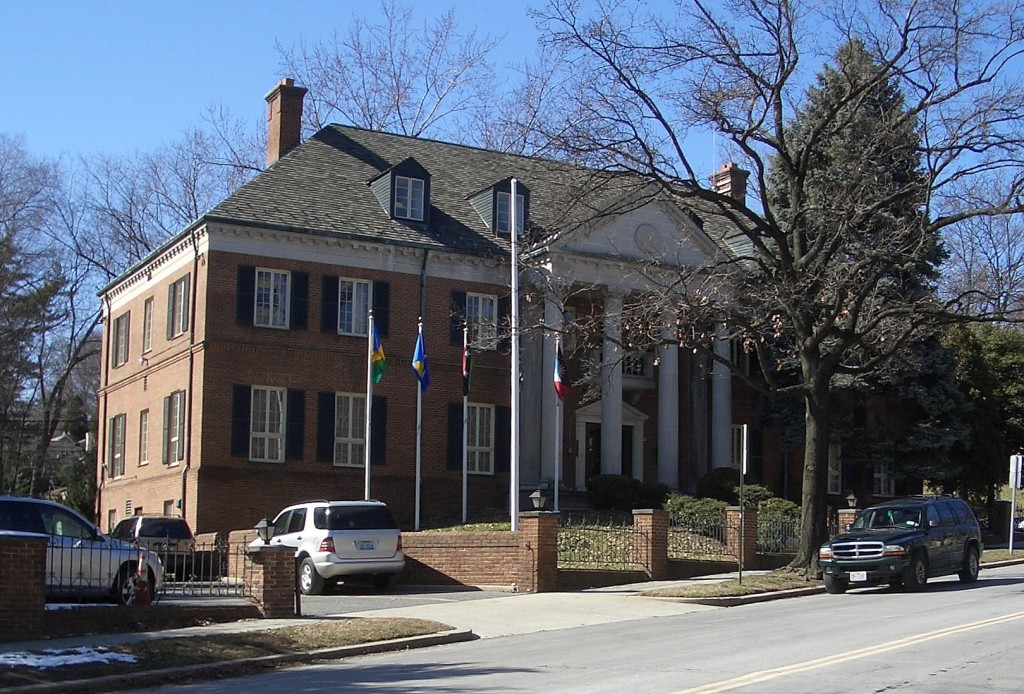
- Incumbent; Elizabeth Darius Clarke since August 3, 2015
- Inaugural holder: Barry Bertrand Lucas Auguste
- Formation: April 24, 1980

The Saint Lucianese ambassador in Washington, D.C. is the official representative of the Government in Castries to the Government of the United States.

== List of representatives ==
| Diplomatic agrément | Diplomatic accreditation | Ambassador | Observations | List of prime ministers of Saint Lucia | List of presidents of the United States | Term end |
|---|---|---|---|---|---|---|
| February 13, 1980 | April 24, 1980 | Barry Bertrand Lucas Auguste | | Allan Fitzgerald Laurent Louisy | Jimmy Carter | |
| August 3, 1984 | August 29, 1984 | Joseph Edsel Edmunds | (*July 1, 1935 at Barbados) primary secondary school in Castrices Staint Lucia: In 1954 he obtained the University of Cambridge Overseas Higher School Certificate and was appointed to the staff of St. Mary's College where he taught science. | John Compton | Ronald Reagan | |
| September 4, 1998 | September 10, 1998 | Sonia Merlyn Johnny | | Kenneth Anthony | Bill Clinton | |
| June 12, 2008 | June 26, 2008 | Michael Louis | | Stephenson King | George W. Bush | |
| September 12, 2012 | September 19, 2012 | Sonia M. Johnny | | Kenny Anthony | Barack Obama | |
| July 22, 2015 | August 3, 2015 | Elizabeth Darius-Clarke | | Kenny Anthony | Barack Obama | |
| November 12, 2016 | September 8, 2017 | Anton E. Edmunds | | Allen Chastanet | Donald Trump | July 28, 2021 |
| September 2017 | Till date | Elizabeth Darius Clarke | | Philip J. Pierre | Joe Biden | |
