= Damian Greaves =

Saint Lucian politician

Damian Greaves is a Saint Lucian politician who represented the Dennery South constituency for the Saint Lucia Labour Party until he was defeated in the general election of 11 December 2006. He served as the Minister For Health, Human Services, Family Affairs And Gender Relations in the cabinet of Prime Minister Kenny Anthony from 10 December 2001 to 11 December 2006.
