= List of ambassadors of China to Saint Lucia =

The Chinese Ambassador to Saint Lucia was the official representative of the People's Republic of China to Saint Lucia between 1997 and 2007.

In August 1997, St. Lucian prime minister Kenny Anthony announced that St. Lucia had established diplomatic relations with China. Bilateral relations between the countries were suspended after St. Lucia chose to recognize Taiwan, which St. Lucia had recognized from 1984, under the first premiership of John Compton.

== List of representatives ==
Term start	Ambassador	Chinese language zh:中国驻圣卢西亚大使列表	Observations	Premier of the People's Republic of China	Prime Minister of Saint Lucia	Term end
August 1997			The governments in Beijing and Castries established diplomatic relations.	Li Peng	Kenny Anthony	
August 1997	Gu Pine	顾品锷		Li Peng	Kenny Anthony	August 1999
September 1999	Liang Jianming	梁健明		Zhu Rongji	Kenny Anthony	February 2002
March 2002	Gu Huaming	古华明		Zhu Rongji	Kenny Anthony	May 2007
