= Emancipation (soundtrack) =

Emancipation (Soundtrack from the Apple Original Film)

Film score by Marcelo Zarvos
- Released: December 9, 2022
- Recorded: 2022
- Genre: Film score
- Length: 71:24
- Label: Lakeshore
- Producer: Marcelo Zarvos

Marcelo Zarvos chronology
A Journal for Jordan (2022)	Emancipation (2022)	Big George Foreman (2023)

Emancipation (Soundtrack from the Apple Original Film) is the soundtrack to the 2022 film of the same name directed by Antoine Fuqua and starring Will Smith. The original score is composed by Marcelo Zarvos, who earlier worked on Fuqua's directorials Brooklyn's Finest (2009), What's My Name: Muhammad Ali (2019) and The Guilty (2021). The score was released by Lakeshore Records on December 9, 2022.

== Development ==
Marcelo Zarvos felt that "the bar was very high" as the film was relevant and momentous for the current scenario. He read the script before filming and immediately began sketching themes, especially for the climatic sequence, as Zarvos felt "this whole score needs to lead to that moment. We need to get to that size and scope without feeling manipulated. It needs to feel inevitable and natural." Zarvos continued to write music even after the filming began. He was further suggested by Fuqua that the music needed to be fairly complex. to feel textural and being close to get the horror feel without being a horror score.

Zarvos employed 75 musicians from the London Symphony Orchestra along with the 40-member vocal choir. However, the orchestra has been detuned to create a sense of uneasiness, especially in the scenes of brutality and when Ben Foster's Fassel pursuing the escaped Peter (Smith) through the Louisiana swamps. Furthermore, he layered the percussion with all kinds of voices. The single-stringed percussion instrument berimbau was the first musical sound heard in the film. (Note: Berimbau is initially originated in Africa and also commonly heard in Brazilian music. It is widely associated with the capoeira fighting tradition that began with enslaved Africans in the Western Hemisphere.)

Fuqua insisted Zarvos to convey the sound of forest, and Peter's ancestral sound being balanced with his Christian faith which should sound surreal, spiritual and nightmarish. Hence he used European choir and other voice elements, whom do not perform any distinguishable words. The choral sounds were meant to evoke more of the spiritual and religious texture, but communicating with nature as well.

In addition to the orchestra and choir, Zarvos recorded soloists from around the world, African vocal tradition singer Joel Virgel, and Venezuelan born ethnic woodwind player Pedro Eustache, who played vaccine, a single-note bamboo trumpet heard in Haiti. Furthermore, traditional American folk sounds using fiddle and accordion were used in the score.

== Reception ==
Ann Hornaday of The Washington Post complimented Zarvos' score as "sombre" and "dissonant". Justin Chang of Los Angeles Times called the score "unsubtly wielded". Johnny Oleksinski of New York Post commented "Marcelo Zarvos’ unrelenting score, before it finds cinematic sweep during a later Civil War battle, suggests a modern revenge movie featuring cars and cool sunglasses." Nick Schager of The Daily Beast wrote that Zarvos' score and Fuqua's aesthetic approach "incessantly calls attention to itself". Dwight Brown, writing for Pride Publishing, called it a "decent score".

== Track listing ==
No.	Title	Length
1.	"Opening / Camp Arrival"	4:15
2.	"Stay Together"	3:24
3.	"Burial and Fugue"	2:51
4.	"If You Go"	1:04
5.	"Camp Escape"	5:03
6.	"Faith Confirmed"	4:04
7.	"Getting Close"	1:47
8.	"Not My God"	2:55
9.	"I Fight Them"	1:41
10.	"Take Freedom"	3:58
11.	"Baton Rouge"	3:37
12.	"Girl with the Cross"	2:57
13.	"Runner"	4:16
14.	"House on Fire"	4:58
15.	"Sacred Motivation"	5:05
16.	"John at the Tree"	3:38
17.	"Marching Home"	1:59
18.	"Fassel"	4:00
19.	"We are Free"	2:14
20.	"Finding Dodienne"	1:38
21.	"Peter's Image"	3:07
22.	"Amazing Grace"	2:53
Total length:		71:24

== Accolades ==
Accolades received by Black Panther: Wakanda Forever
Award	Date of ceremony	Category	Recipient(s)	Result	Ref.
Hollywood Music in Media Awards	November 16, 2022	Original Score — Feature Film	Marcelo Zarvos	Nominated	
