= Tea meeting =

Traditional event in Saint Kitts and Nevis

The tea meeting tradition is a part of the culture of Saint Kitts and Nevis, Barbados and the Virgin Islands. Tea meetings feature music and performances that include comic speeches, stentorian oratory and songs. The performances are introduced by a chairman and vice-chairman, who are also performers themselves. The audience traditionally heckles the performers.
