= Governor Lewis =

Governor Lewis may refer to:

- Allen Montgomery Lewis (1909–1993), Governor-General of Saint Lucia several times between 1974 and 1987
- David P. Lewis (1820–1884), 23rd Governor of Alabama
- James T. Lewis (1819–1904), 9th Governor of Wisconsin
- Meriwether Lewis (1774–1809), 2nd Governor of Louisiana Territory
- Morgan Lewis (governor) (1754–1844), 3rd Governor of New York
