= Order of Saint Lucia =

Order of chivalry based in St Lucia

Awarded by the King of Saint Lucia
- Type: Award
- Eligibility: Saint Lucian
- Awarded for: A national order of merit
- Status: Currently constituted
- Founder: Elizabeth II
- Sovereign: Charles III
- Chancellor: Governor-General
- Grades: Knight/Dame Grand Cross of the Order of Saint Lucia (GCSL); Knight/Dame Commander of the Order of Saint Lucia (KCSL/DCSL); Saint Lucia Cross (SLC); Saint Lucia Medal of Honour (SLMH); Saint Lucia Medal of Merit (SLMM); Saint Lucia Les Pitons Medal (SLPM); National Service Cross (NSC); National Service Medal
- Former grades: NA

Precedence
- Next (higher): Victoria Cross, George Cross
- Next (lower): Varies, depending on rank
- Ribbon bar of the order

The Order of Saint Lucia is an order of chivalry established in 1986 by Elizabeth II, Queen of Saint Lucia.

The order is bestowed by the governor-general on behalf of the sovereign. The governor-general has the right to exercise all powers and authorities of the sovereign in respect of the Order.

In February 2016, for the first time in the order's history, the Queen approved the awarding of the grades of Knight and Dame.

== Composition ==
The Order of Saint Lucia comprises seven classes. In decreasing order of seniority, these are:

- Knight/Dame Grand Cross of the Order of Saint Lucia (GCSL)
- Knight/Dame Commander of the Order of Saint Lucia (KCSL/DCSL)
- Saint Lucia Cross (SLC)
- Saint Lucia Medal of Honour (SLMH)
- Saint Lucia Medal of Merit (SLMM)
- Saint Lucia Les Pitons Medal (SLPM)
- National Service Cross (NSC)
- National Service Medal (NSM)

== Awards Committee ==
While the monarch is sovereign of the order and the governor-general is chancellor, there is also established an awards committee to decide on eligible members of the order. Members of the committee include a chairman appointed by the governor-general after consultation with the prime minister and the leader of the opposition, the chairman of the Public Service Commission, the chairman of the Teaching Service Commission, the commissioner of police, and three persons representative of the general public appointed by the governor-general of whom two shall are appointed on the advice of the prime minister and one on the advice of the leader of the opposition. The committee secretary is appointed by the governor-general.

== Eligibility ==
The Order of Saint Lucia may only be awarded to citizens of Saint Lucia. Honorary awards may be made to persons other than citizens of Saint Lucia and are made with the approval of the sovereign on the advice of the prime minister. For Knights/Dames Commander, appointments may only be awarded to no more than three persons every two years, and the number of living Knights/Dames shall not exceed 20 at any one time.

== Insignia ==
The riband of the order is composed of vertical stripes of the colours blue, gold, black, and white. When worn with the insignia of the Grand Cross of the Order of Saint Lucia or the Saint Lucia Cross, the riband is a width of two inches; and when worn with the insignia of the other grades of the order, the riband is the width of one and a half inches.

The Grand Cross is of gold and the recipient shall is invested with a Star, and a Collar to which is affixed the badge of the order. Upon retirement from office of governor-general, the recipient is only entitled to wear the Star with and the badge of the order suspended from the riband of the order and worn round the neck.

The Cross of the order is awarded in gold and is worn from the riband of the order round the neck.

The Medal of Merit and the Medal of Honour can be awarded in gold or silver.

The Les Pitons Medal can be awarded in gold, silver or bronze.

All of the medals are worn as a pendant from the riband of the order from the left breast.

== Precedence and privileges ==
When worn in Saint Lucia the Order takes precedence over all other decorations except the Victoria Cross and the George Cross.

Knights or Dames Grand Cross are entitled to the style "His Excellency" or "Her Excellency", the prefix "Sir" (for knights) or "Dame" to their first names and use the post-nominal "GCSL". Only those persons appointed governor-general shall be awarded the Knight or Dame Grand Cross.

Knights/Dames Commander are entitled to the prefix "Sir" (for knights) or "Dame" to their first names and use the post-nominal "KCSL" or "DCSL".

Saint Lucia Crosses are entitled to the style "The Honourable" and use the post-nominal "SLC".

Other ranks use the post-nominals "SLMH" (Saint Lucia Medal of Honour), "SLMM" (Saint Lucia Medal of Merit), "SLPM" (Les Pitons Medal) and "NSC" (National Service Cross).

== Restrictions ==
The rank of Grand Cross is granted only to a person holding the office of governor-general. The number of persons holding the Cross can not exceed 25 at any one time and no more than three people can be awarded the rank in any one year. All honorary appointments are supernumerary.

== Recipients ==
=== Grand Cross of the Order of Saint Lucia ===
- 2018 - Sir Neville Cenac, GCSL, GCMG
- 1997 – Dame Calliopa Pearlette Louisy, GCSL, GCMG
- 1996 – Sir George William Mallet, GCSL, GCMG, CBE
- 1988 – Sir Stanislaus A. James, GCSL, GCMG
- 1982 – Sir Allen Montgomery Lewis, GCSL, GCMG, GCVO, KStJ
- 1980 – Boswell Williams, GCSL

=== Knight/Dame Commander of the Order of Saint Lucia ===
- 2025 – Sir Cato T. Laurencin, KCSL (For exceptional and outstanding service of national importance to Saint Lucia)
- 2025 – Sir Bola Tinubu, KCSL (Honorary title)
- 2022 – Sir Calixte George, KCSL (For exceptional and outstanding service of national importance to Saint Lucia)
- 2022 – Hon Sir Winston Clive Victor Parris, KCSL, SLC, CMG (For exceptional and outstanding service of national importance to Saint Lucia)
- 2022 – Hon Sir George Theophilus, KCSL, SLC (For exceptional and outstanding service of national importance to Saint Lucia)
- 2016 – Sir Derek Walcott, KCSL, OBE (For exceptional and outstanding service of national importance to Saint Lucia)
- 2016 – Sir Vaughan Lewis, KCSL (For exceptional and outstanding service of national importance to Saint Lucia)
- 2016 – Dame Lawrence Laurent, DCSL (For exceptional and outstanding service of national importance to Saint Lucia)

=== The Saint Lucia Cross ===
- 2026 – Stephen McNamara, SLC (For distinguished service in Sports Administration, Financial Services, Hospitality Industry, and Law)
- 2026 – Earl Stephen Huntley, SLC (For distinguished service in Diplomacy, Public Service, Media Communications, and Sports)
- 2025 – Daren Sammy, SLC, OBE, N.Pk (For his contributions to cricket and youth development)
- 2025 – Julien Alfred, SLC (For her achievements in Sprint (running))
- 2025 – Levern Spencer, SLC (For her excellence in track and field)
- 2020 – Jonathan Romel Daniel, SLC (For Distinguished service in the field of Medicine and National Development)
- 2020 – Joseph Anthony Francis Compton, SLC (For Distinguished service in the field of National Development)
- 2020 – Philip McDermott, SLC (For Distinguished service to Saint Lucia in the field of Philanthropy) Honorary award
- 2016 – Harold Calixte Simmons, SLC (For distinguished service and contribution to Culture and the Arts)
- 2010 – Winston Clive Victor Parris, SLC, SLMM, CMG (for outstanding contribution in the area of medicine)
- 2009 – George Theophilus, SLC (for outstanding contribution to the financial sector)
- 2009 – Louis Bertrand George, SLC (for contribution to national development, especially to the field of Education)
- 2008 – Arnott Francois Valmont, SLC (for outstanding contribution to the business community)
- 2006 – Leon Felix Thomas, SLC (for distinguished and outstanding national service in the fields of Education and Public Administration)
- 2005 – Charles Marie Emmanuel Cadet, SLC (for distinguished and outstanding service to Saint Lucia)
- 2005 – Sir Julian Robert Hunte, SLC, KCMG, OBE (for distinguished and outstanding service to Saint Lucia)

=== Saint Lucia Medal of Merit ===
- 2020 - David R. Williams (Gold)
- 2016 – Levern Spencer
- 1994 – Dame Marie Selipha Descartes "Sesenne"

== See also ==
- Commonwealth realms orders and decorations
- Knight Bachelor

== Member list ==
- Members: 2017
- Members: 2016
- Members: 2015
- Members: 2014
- Members: 2013
- Members: 2012
- Members: 2011
- Members: 2010
- Members: 2009
- Members: 2008
- Members: 2007
- Members: 2005
- Members: 2003
- Members: 2002
- Members: 2001
- Members: 2000
