= St. Joseph's Convent (Saint Lucia) =

Location
- Cedars Road, Castries; Saint Lucia
- Coordinates: 14°00′22″N 60°58′55″W

Information
- Religious affiliation: Roman Catholic
- Established: 1854
- Principal: Mrs. Rosaria Auguste
- Colours: Blue and White

St. Joseph's Convent is a Roman Catholic secondary school for girls located in Castries, Saint Lucia.

The school was founded in 1854 by the Sisters of St. Joseph of Cluny.

== Notable alumnae ==
- Suzie d'Auvergne, High Court Judge
- Dame Pearlette Louisy, Governor General of Saint Lucia
- Gale Rigobert, Member of Parliament for Micoud North

== In the media ==
St. Joseph's was the main setting for the second episode of " Extreme School ", a CBBC show about badly behaving British students sent to strict forgone schools for a week
