= Julian Hunte =

Saint Lucian politician (born 1940)

Sir Julian Hunte SLC KCMG OBE
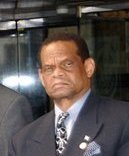
- Hunte in 2004

President of the United Nations General Assembly
- In office 16 September 2003 – 17 September 2004
- Preceded by: Jan Kavan
- Succeeded by: Jean Ping

Personal details
- Born: March 14, 1940 (age 86) Castries, Saint Lucia
- Spouse: Charlotte Elizabeth Jennifer Hunte
- Children: 4

Sir Julian Robert Hunte, SLC, KCMG, OBE, (born 14 March 1940) is a St. Lucian politician and businessman. He was the Minister of Foreign Affairs of Saint Lucia from April 2001 to 26 October 2004, when he was succeeded by Petrus Compton. He is the Permanent Representative (or Ambassador) for Saint Lucia to the United Nations, after presenting his credentials to the Secretary-General of the United Nations on 7 December 2004.

Hunte was the President of the United Nations General Assembly during its 58th regular session (2003–2004). He was appointed to the Order of the British Empire (OBE), in recognition of service to the Government and people of Saint Lucia, in 1979. The Saint Lucia Cross (SLC) for distinguished and outstanding service. Pope John Paul II conferred the Papal Honor of Knight of the Grand Cross Pian on him in September 2004.

== Political career ==
He first entered politics in 1967, serving as a councillor, and then as mayor of Castries from 1970 and 1971. He joined the Saint Lucia Labour Party in 1978, and became leader of the party in 1984. He was elected to the House of Assembly of Saint Lucia in 1987, and was Leader of the Opposition until 1996, when he was replaced by Kenny Anthony.

In 2001 Julian Hunte was appointed to the Senate of Saint Lucia, and was invited by the Prime Minister of Saint Lucia to join the Cabinet that same year as Minister of Foreign Affairs.

Hunte stood for election in the constituency of Gros Islet in the general election of 11 December 2006, but lost to Lenard Montoute of the United Workers Party (UWP).

== Other work and background ==
Hunte's educational background is in business administration and accountancy. In addition to his diplomatic work, he was as of 2014 Chairman and Chief Executive of the Julian R. Hunte Group of insurance, real estate and packaging and storage companies.

He was the Chair of the Saint Lucia National Development Corporation, which is the country's principal development agency. He also served as Director of the Saint Lucia Development Bank, and the National Commercial Bank of Saint Lucia.

Hunte played cricket at a national level in Saint Lucia, and participated as an administrator at the national, regional and international levels. He was President of the Saint Lucia National Cricket Association and of the Windward Islands Cricket Board of Control, and President of the West Indies Cricket Board, which he represented on the International Cricket Council, the institution responsible for international governance of the game.

He is married to Charlotte Elizabeth Jennifer Hunte (née Clarke), and has four children.

== Honours ==
- Order of the British Empire (OBE) 1979
- The Saint Lucia Cross (SLC)
- Knight Commander Order of St Michael and St George (KCMG)
- Pope John Paul II conferred the Papal Honor of Knight of the Grand Cross Pian on him in September 2004.

Positions in intergovernmental organisations
Preceded by Jan Kavan	President of the United Nations General Assembly; 2003–2004	Succeeded by Jean Ping
