= List of ambassadors of Saint Lucia to Taiwan =

Coordinates: 25.024742°N 121.553126°E

Ambassador of Saint Lucia to Taiwan
- Incumbent; Robert Kennedy Lewis since May 1, 2018
- Inaugural holder: Hubert Emmanuel
- Formation: June 4, 2015

The Saint Lucianese ambassador in Taipei is the official representative of the Government in Castries to the Government of Taiwan.

St. Lucia and Taiwan maintained diplomatic relations from 1984, during the first premiership of John Compton. Compton's successor Kenny Anthony led his government to recognize China in August 1997. Though relations between St. Lucia and Taiwan were reestablished in April 2007, the first ambassador of St. Lucia to Taiwan, Hubert Emmanuel, was not appointed until 2015.

== List of representatives ==
Diplomatic agrément/Diplomatic accreditation	Ambassador	Observations	List of prime ministers of Saint Lucia	List of premiers of the Republic of China	Term end
May 7, 1984		The governments in Taipei and Castries established diplomatic relations.	John Compton	Yu Kuo-hwa	August 29, 1997
August 1997		The governments in Beijing and Castries established diplomatic relations.	Kenneth Anthony	Li Peng	May 5, 2007
April 30, 2007		The governments in Taipei and Castries established diplomatic relations.	John Compton	Chang Chun-hsiung	
June 4, 2015	Hubert Emmanuel	St. Lucia opened its embassy in Taipei, its first embassy in Asia. Emmanuel was the first ambassador of St. Lucia to the government of the Republic of China in Taiwan, and awarded an Order of Brilliant Star near the end of his tenure.	Kenny Anthony	Mao Chi-kuo	March 31, 2018
May 1, 2018	Edwin Laurent	Laurent was awarded the Order of Brilliant Star with Grand Cordon.	Allen Chastanet	Lin Chuan	March 2022
April 20, 2022	Robert Kennedy Lewis		Philip J. Pierre	Su Tseng-chang	present

- Foreign relations of Saint Lucia
