= Joner =

Joner is a surname. Notable people with the surname include:

- Alexandra Joner (born 1990), Norwegian singer and dancer, daughter of Sverre
- Kristoffer Joner (born 1972), Norwegian actor
- Sverre Indris Joner (born 1963), Norwegian musician, composer, and arranger

== See also ==
- Jonel
