= Babala =

Babla बाबला BABLA
- Village development committee
- BABLA
- Location in Nepal
- Coordinates: 29.32°N 81.24°E
- Country: Nepal
- Province: Sudurpashchim Province
- District: Achham District

Population (1991)
  - Total: 2,623
  - Religions: Hindu
- Time zone: UTC+5:45 (Nepal Time)
- Postal code: Ward no. 8
- Area code: Ward no.8

Babla is a village development committee in Achham District in Sudurpashchim Province of western Nepal. According to the 1991 Nepal census it has a population of 2,623 and had 539 houses in the village The population is entirely Hindu.

In 2001, 1252 people were illiterate, 252 male and 1001 female. In 2001, 805 in Babla were attending school, 459 male and 347 female.

In July 2003 the village was affected by landslides and resulted in an acute shortage of food. The flood displaced twelve families. The Nepal Red Cross Society (NRCS) was sent in to provide relief materials like food, clothes, utensils and cash. A flood victim in Babla reported to the Kathmandu Post "Everything including my house has been swept away by the landslides".
