= Boswell Williams =

Saint Lucian politician (1926–2014)

Boswell Williams GCSL

2nd Governor-General of Saint Lucia
- In office June 19, 1980 – December 12, 1982
- Monarch: Elizabeth II
- Preceded by: Allen Montgomery Lewis
- Succeeded by: Allen Montgomery Lewis

Personal details
- Born: May 16, 1926 Vieux Fort, Saint Lucia
- Died: July 20, 2014 (aged 88) Sans Soucis, Castries, St. Lucia

Boswell Bennie Williams (May 16, 1926 – July 20, 2014) was a Saint Lucian politician who represented the district of Vieux Fort in the legislature from 1974 to 1979.

He was appointed by Queen Elizabeth II of Saint Lucia as governor-general on June 19, 1980, replacing Sir Allen Montgomery Lewis, father of the former prime minister Vaughan Lewis. He was initially acting governor general, becoming governor general in December 1981. Williams had to confront the most serious constitutional crisis in the history of Saint Lucia soon after the rejection of Prime Minister Allan Louisy's budget proposal. He was removed from office by the Queen on the advice of Louisy with effect from December 12, 1982.

Williams died at his home in Sans Soucis on July 20, 2014, at the age of 88.

== See also ==
- History of Saint Lucia
