= Kont (Caribbean) =

Forms of oral tradition in the Caribbean

Kont are forms of oral tradition in the Caribbean.

== Saint Lucia ==
Kont is a kind of Saint Lucian folk song, performed as part of the funereal ceremony by mourners outside the deceased's house. These mourners sing kont, a responsorial Creole song, accompanied by drumming. The lyrics may refer to the last words or other aspects of the deceased's death. Mourners also dance to both the débòt and bélé, accompanied zo or tibwa and ka.

== Dominica ==
Kont is a form of traditional storytelling of Dominica, mostly performed at night-time festivals, wakes, festivals and other celebrations. Kont storytellers use elements of local history and legend, and often provide moral or ethical messages. A simple theme song, one line in length, frequently based on a duet between two characters, is an important recurrent element of kont storytelling.

== See also ==
- Music of Saint Lucia
- Music of Dominica
