= Maulud =

Maulud (Sindhi: مولود) is a Sindhi form of poetry about Muhammad's life, with poems consisting of between five and ten verses. The form developed from the earlier forms vā'ī and kafi. In Sindh Mauluds are sung in a group of men in beautiful way.
