= Sonia M. Johnny =

Saint Lucian lawyer and diplomat (born 1953)

- Born: Sonia Merlyn Johnny; 1953 (age 72–73); St. Lucia
- Occupations: diplomat, lawyer
- Years active: 1979–present
- Spouse: Lloyd Jackson

Sonia M. Johnny (born 1953) is a St. Lucian attorney who served as her country's first woman ambassador. She has served as the Chief Negotiator for the Caribbean, President of the Permanent Council of the Organization of American States, Chief of the OAS Department of Trade, Tourism and Competitiveness and Deputy Director of the Summits Secretariat.

== Biography ==
Sonia Merlyn Johnny was born in 1953 on St. Lucia. She attended St. Joseph's Catholic High School in Castries, Saint Lucia and went on to attain a bachelor's degree from the University of the West Indies. Subsequently, Johnny completed graduate studies in International Public Policy at the Johns Hopkins School of Advanced International Studies and a law degree at the Georgetown University Law School. In 1979 Johnny began working at the St. Lucian Ministry of Foreign Affairs. In 1984, she was sent to Washington, D.C. to establish the St. Lucian embassy for a male colleague who would serve as ambassador for fifteen years. In 1993, Johnny attained her law license for the District of Columbia and spent the next several years working on a trade dispute between CARICOM, the European Union, and the United States, over the banana trade, twice being elected by CARICOM to coordinate efforts on behalf of the member nations.

On 17 November 1997, Johnny was appointed as St. Lucia's first female ambassador to the OAS and the United States. She immediately became chair of the Leo Rowe Fund, which provides loans for fellowships and scholarships, which she headed for the next eight years. Johnny was a part of the delegation sent by CARICOM to Haiti after the 2004 Haitian coup d'état to evaluate the situation, being noted for her "shrewd negotiating skills and suave diplomacy" in the crisis, helped restore calm. In 2005, she was elected as Chief Negotiator for the Caribbean with regard to matters concerning the Organization of American States (OAS) and was elected as President of the OAS Permanent Council beginning in 2006. In 2007, Johnny resigned as ambassador and Permanent Council president and accepted a post to chair the Trade, Tourism, and Competitiveness Department of OAS, which she continued to head until 2010. In 2011 she became the Deputy Director of the Summits of the Americas Secretariat serving in that capacity until work was completed on the 2012 Summit of the Americas.

On 19 September 2012, Johnny returned as St. Lucian ambassador to the United States. In 2014, she was presented with the International Recognition of Service Award from the organization Women Empowered to Achieve the Impossible for her record of diplomatic and humanitarian services and was honored by the Caribbean and African Christian Leadership Council. In 2014, Johnny served as one of the quarterly chairs of the OAS Permanent Council and in 2016 was appointed to serve on another OAS delegation as part of a fact-finding mission to Haiti.

== Sources ==
- Séphocle, Marilyn (2000). Then, They Were Twelve: The Women of Washington's Embassy Row. Westport, Connecticut: Greenwood Publishing Group. ISBN 978-0-275-96833-5.
- Sleeman, Elizabeth, ed. (2001). The International Who's Who of Women 2002 (3rd ed.). London, England: Europa Publications. ISBN 978-1-85743-122-3.
