= Petrus Compton =

Foreign minister

Petrus Compton also known by his nickname, "Papo", is a Saint Lucian politician and senator. He was the Foreign Minister of Saint Lucia from October 26, 2004, when he was appointed to succeed Julian Hunte, until December 2006, when a new government took office. Compton was previously the attorney general and minister of justice from July 1997 to October 2004, until he became Minister of Foreign Affairs.

Compton is a graduate of the University of the West Indies, Mona, Jamaica, where he received a bachelor's degree in English, and the Cave Hill, Barbados, campus where he obtained his Bachelor of Laws degree (LLB). Mr. Compton pursued graduate studies at the University College London which culminated in the award of the Master of Laws degree (LLM). He was called to the British Bar at Gray's Inn in London.
