= Cecil Lay =

Saint Lucian politician

Cecil Lay is a former member of the House of Assembly of Saint Lucia for Vieux-Fort North. He is a member of the Saint Lucia Labour Party.
