= Shak-shak =

Caribbean musical instrument

Percussion instrument
- Classification: Percussion
- Hornbostel–Sachs classification: 112.1 (Shaken idiophones or rattles)
- Inventor: Lesser Antilles

The shak-shak (or chak-chak) is a hand-held shaken percussive idiophone. They are played in Barbados, Grenada, Montserrat, and elsewhere in the Caribbean and Latin American musical traditions. The term shak-shak is believed to be onomatopoeic in origin, derived from the characteristic sound the instrument produces when shaken.

== Description ==
The instrument comprises a hollow vessel—traditionally a dried gourd—filled with seeds, beads, or pebbles. When shaken, these contents hit the interior walls, producing a sharp, rhythmic sound. Shak‑shaks are typically used in pairs but may be played singly. The tonal quality depends on their construction and materials; for instance, metal-bodied versions yield louder, more penetrating tones, while those made from plastic provide softer rhythms.

== Origins ==
The shak‑shak has roots in indigenous South American cultures, with the Guarani and Tupinambá peoples believed to have used early forms in ceremonial and divinatory contexts. While referred to as the shak-shak in much of the Lesser Antilles, the instrument is more commonly known as a maraca in the Greater Antilles, derived from the Guarani word mbaraca. It was later adapted by Inca and pre‑Inca societies in the Andes (known as the chajchas). During the early modern period, the instrument spread across the Caribbean, evolving through West African influences into genres like Trinidad and Tobago's parang, Brazilian samba, Afro-Cuban music, calypso, and various Latin American folk music and popular styles.
