= Quarta =

Quarta is a surname. Notable people with the surname include:

== People ==
- Lucas Martínez Quarta (born 1996), Argentine footballer
- Roberto Quarta (born 1949), Italian-American businessman
- Nicola Quarta (1927–2020), Italian politician

== Characters ==
- Xenovia Quarta, High School DxD characters
