= Vaccine (instrument) =

Single note trumpet

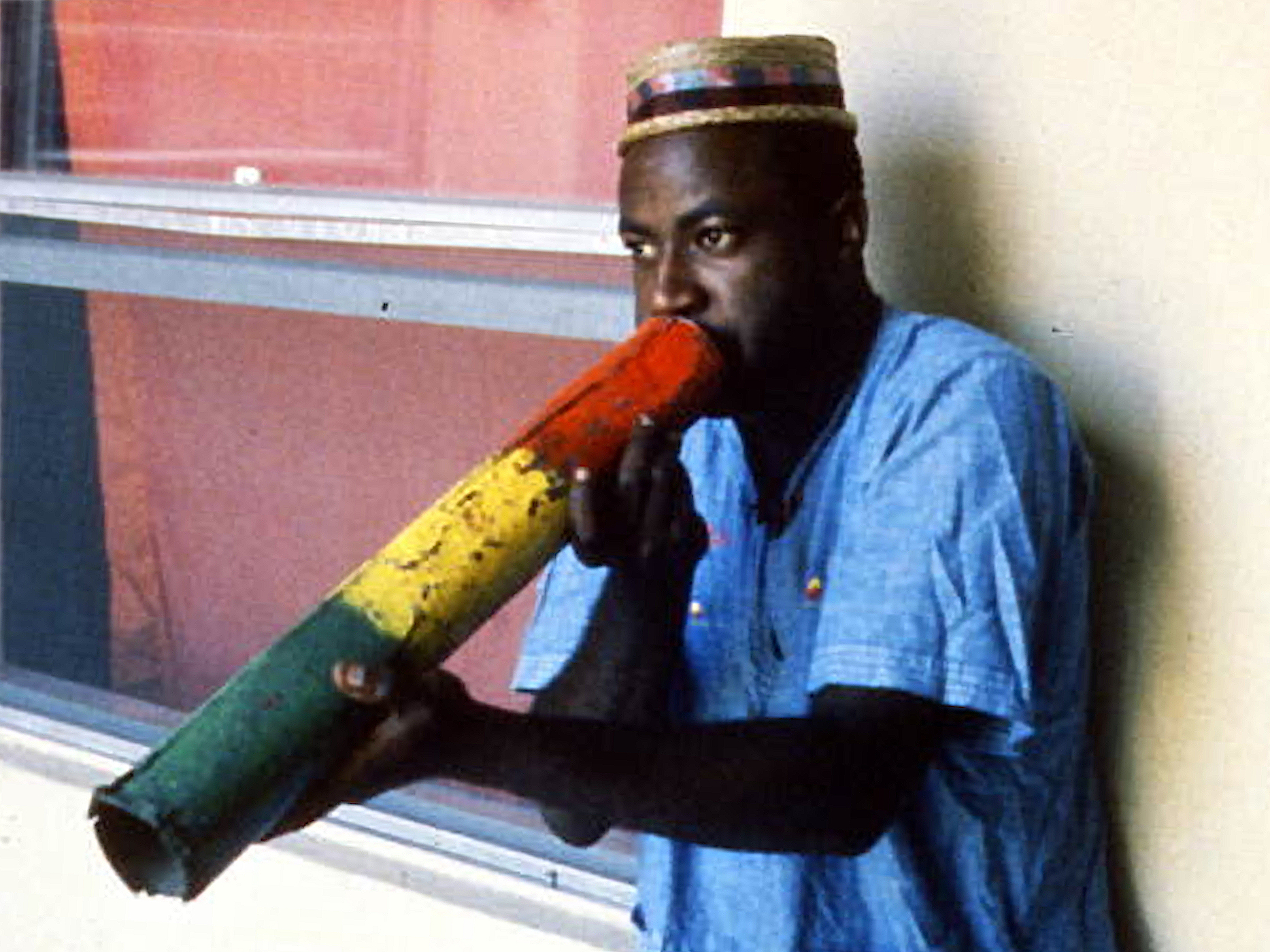
Vaksin (or vaksen, vaccine), a simple tube bamboo trumpet blown by a musician.

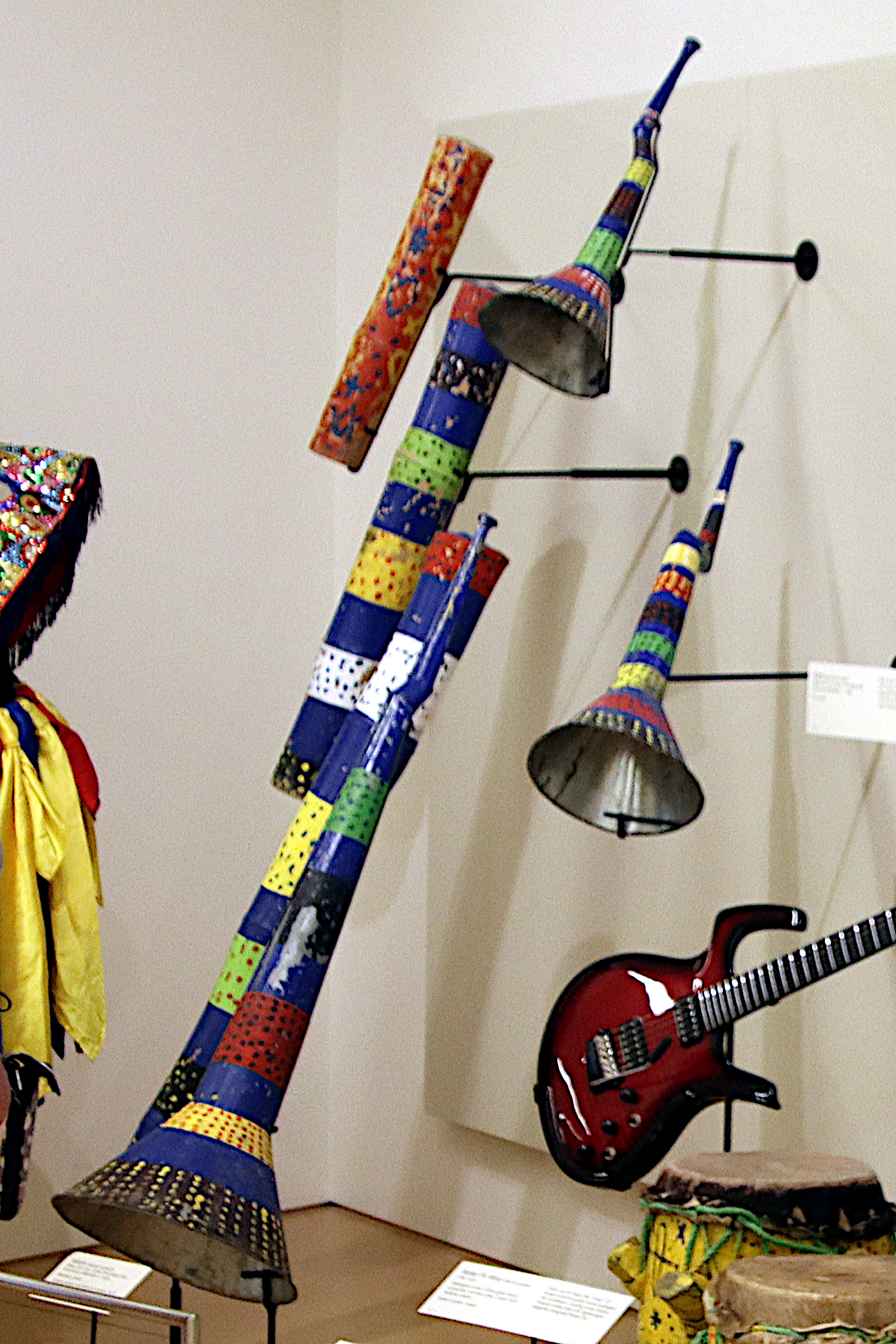
Vaksin (cylinders in rear-left) and Konè (flared horns in center-front), exhibited at the Musical Instrument Museum (Phoenix)

Vaccine (or sometimes vaksin) are rudimentary single-note trumpets found in Haiti and, to a lesser extent, the Dominican Republic as well as Jamaica. They consist of a simple tube, usually bamboo, with a mouthpiece at one end.

They are thus also referred to as banbou or bambú, as well as bois bourrique (or bwa bourik), granboe, fututo, or boom pipe. They are not to be confused with other Haitian handmade trumpets called konè or klewon, made of a yard-long white metal tube with a flared horn, called kata.

Vaccine players are known as banboulyès.

== Origins ==
Haitian ethnographer Jean Bernard traces the vaksin back to indigenous precolonial peoples of Haiti. However both Thompson and Holloway draw links to the single-note Bakongo bamboo trumpets called disoso, themselves originated in Mbuti hocketing music. Gillis also likens them to trumpets used in Bambara broto music along the Niger, and Jamaican Kumina.

== Construction ==
Traditionally, vaccine are made of a length of bamboo, hollowed-out and dried, with a node membrane pierced and wrapped with leather or bicycle inner-tube rubber to form a mouthpiece at one end. One or more segments are taken from higher or lower in the bamboo trunk to fashion vaccines; usually more than 1 m long and 5 to 7 cm in diameter. Each one is cut shorter or longer in order to produce a higher or lower tone: bas banbou is long and gives a low-pitched sound, and charlemagne banbou is short and is pitched high.

McAlister explains that Afro-Hispaniolan lore involves asking the bamboo plant for its use and leaving a small payment in its place. Landies witnessed this process, which she described as follows: "the harvest of the bamboo was accompanied by an offering. [...] [It] is harvested with the permission of Simbi, a Petwo Lwa who loves water, as bamboo in the Dominican Republic grows in moist land, e.g., along rivers"

On occasion, iron or plastic pipes are substituted for the bamboo.

== Playing ==
A typical vaccine band is composed of three to five players, usually marching abreast of each other. Players use a method called hocketing, whereby each individual blows a single tone rhythmically to create an ostinato motif together. These motifs are usually composed through a process of group improvisation.

To keep rhythm, vaccine players also beat a rhythmic timeline, called kata with a long stick on the side of the tube, making the instrument both melodic and percussive.

== Tuning and scale ==
Within an ostinato, vaccine tones stack up in approximate third intervals to each other—creating tritones and arpeggiated diminished chords, but without a harmonic intent—with the two treble-most vaccines often tuned a semitone apart. Landies also reports other intervals between the lowest two voices. One of the vaccine serves as the tonal center of the motif.

== Uses ==
Most importantly, vaccines are a key component of rara orchestras. In his 1941 article, Courlander wrote that rara bands "seldom have drums and depend almost entirely on vaccines"; though both Lomax's mid-1930s and McAllister's early 1990s studies report many more instruments—mostly percussive—as part of rara orchestras.

Scholars also report vaccines used as signal horns by parties of agricultural workers, fishermen, stevedores as well as sometimes used in dances of the Congo cycle.
