= Culture of Saint Kitts and Nevis =

The culture of St. Kitts and Nevis, two small Caribbean islands forming one country, has grown mainly out of the West African traditions of the slave population brought in during the colonial period, with most of the population being Black. France and British colonists both settled the islands, and for a period of time the British imported indentured Irish servants. The native Caribs, skilled warriors, defended their lands by attacking the colonies. But by 1782, the British had gained control of St. Kitts and Nevis, which they retained until granting the islands their independence in 1983. British influence remains in the country's official language, English, while some islanders speak an English-based Creole. The influence of the French, Irish, and Carib seems less pronounced.

The people of St. Kitts and Nevis are devoutly religious. Several historic Anglican churches remain on Nevis, and fifty percent of the country's population still practices the religion. Most other people belong to another Christian denomination, though there are some Rastafarians and a few followers of the Baháʼí Faith. An old Jewish cemetery on Nevis proves that there was once a Jewish population as well, but currently there is no active Jewish community in the country.

== Festivities ==
As in other Caribbean nations, the culture on St. Kitts and Nevis is festive and vibrant. Carnivals and celebrations play an important role in island life. At Christmas time, Carnival is in full swing on St. Kitts. The opening gala takes place in mid-December, with events going on until a few days after New Year's. Among these events, crowd favorites include the Miss Caribbean Talented Teen Pageant, the Junior Calypso Show, and the National Carnival Queen Pageant. Of course, there are also plenty of parades full of people wearing colorful, spangled costumes.

Another very popular aspect of Carnival, Masquerade (or Mas) evolved over the past three centuries from a mix of African and European traditions. Masquerade performers wear brightly patterned long-sleeved shirts with trousers, all embellished with bangles, mirrors, and ribbons. Topping off their costumes are masks and headdresses decorated with peacock feathers. Their dances combine elements of waltzes, jigs, wild mas, fertility dances, quadrilles, and other traditional African and European dances.

Stilt-walkers called Moko-Jumbies wear similar but simpler costumes. The word "Moko" may come from the name for a vengeance god in West Africa, where the tradition originated. Or it may derive from the Macaw tree, a tall palm with thorns - headdresses worn by the Moko-Jumbies are said to be patterned after a Macaw in bloom. Wearing stilts six to eight feet high, Moko-Jumbies dance to entertain the crowds.

Clown troupes also perform at this time of year. In groups of about fifty, they dance while a live band plays music. Bells on their baggy, vivid costumes jingle as they move. Pink masks meant to represent Europeans cover their faces.

Apart from Carnival, the island of Nevis has its own unique festival, Culturama. Celebrated on the weekend of Emancipation Day, it began in 1974 when some islanders feared that their native folk art and customs were being lost. They started Culturama to reconnect people with their traditional culture. In addition to arts and crafts, the five-day-long celebration includes dances, music, drama, and religious sacrifices. Parties, boat rides, swimsuit contests, and street jams have also become part of the festivities.

== Music ==
The music of Saint Kitts and Nevis is known for a number of musical celebrations including Carnival (December 17 to January 3 on Saint Kitts). The last week in June features the St Kitts Music Festival, while the week-long Culturama on Nevis lasts from the end of July into early August. There are also other festivals on the island of Saint Kitts. These celebrations typically feature parades, street dances and salsa, jazz, soca, calypso and steelpan music.

== Cuisine ==
With its rich soil, St. Kitts and Nevis grow a wide variety of fresh produce. Abundant seafood and meats such as goat add to the diet. The style of cooking is fairly simple, flavored much like other West Indian cuisine. Goat water stew, perhaps the country's most well-known dish, mixes goat, breadfruit, green pawpaw (papaya), and dumplings (also known as "droppers") in a tomato-based stew. Another favorite dish is cook-up, or pelau, which combines chicken, pig tail, saltfish and vegetables with rice and pigeon peas. Conkies bear a large similarity to tamales, though instead of having filling rolled inside the dough, the cornmeal is mixed together with grated sweet potato, pumpkin, coconut, and a few other ingredients; after wrapping the dough in banana leaves, they are boiled rather than steamed. Sweets tend to be simply made, sometimes with nothing more than fruit, like tamarind or guava, and sugar.

Rum is as popular on St. Kitts and Nevis as it is throughout the Caribbean. The Brinley Gold Company manufactures rum on St. Kitts, with such distinctive flavors as coffee, mango, and vanilla. But the national drink is actually Cane Spirits Rothschild (often abbreviated to CSR), distilled from fresh sugar cane. Belmont Estate and St. Kitts Rum also make rum on the island. In addition, several of the beach bars will provide moonshine rum produced by individuals with homemade stills.

Many villages on Nevis hold cookouts on Friday and Saturday nights, where people come together to eat, drink, play games like dominoes, and have a good time.

== Arts and crafts ==
Artists of St. Kitts and Nevis create works inspired by their own native traditions, life on the islands, and African roots. Pottery is especially notable, both red clay pieces and pieces fired with colorful glazes and indigenous designs. Paintings often depict tropical landscapes, portraits of islanders, or cultural traditions like clowns performing. Other crafts include rug weaving, wooden items such as carvings, batiks and sculptures, and leather work.

== Sports and games ==
Hearkening back to its days as a British colony, the country's most loved sport is cricket. Local, regional, and even international matches are played. Horse racing is also popular, particularly in Nevis. The monthly races are festive events, with music and barbecue adding to the fun spirit. Mountain biking, golf, and soccer are other pastimes. St. Kitts also hosts an annual triathlon, which has become increasingly popular since its inception seven years ago. There is also an annual swim across the channel between St. Kitts and Nevis. A local hash association exists as well, with hashes occurring roughly every third Saturday.

Kim Collins, the 2002 Commonwealth and 2003 World Championship 100m winner, is from St. Kitts and Nevis.
