= George Mallet =

Saint Lucian politician (1923–2010)

Sir George Mallet GCSL GCMG CBE
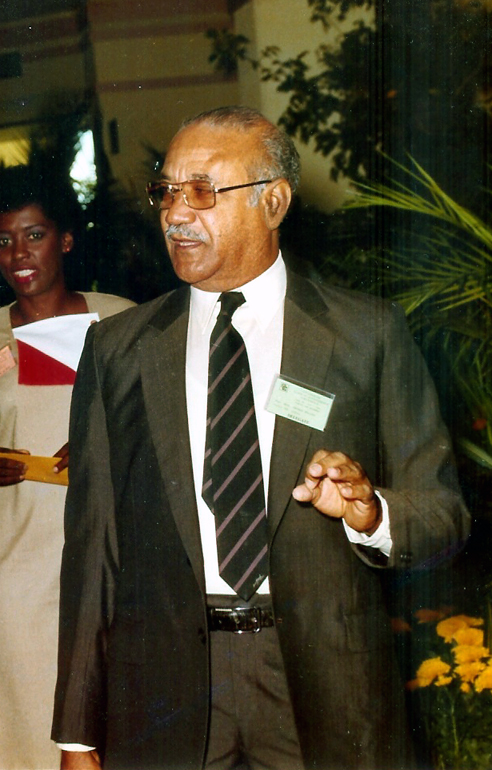

4th Governor-General of Saint Lucia
- In office 1 June 1996 – 17 September 1997
- Monarch: Elizabeth II
- Prime Minister: Vaughan Lewis; Kenny Anthony
- Preceded by: Stanislaus A. James
- Succeeded by: Pearlette Louisy

Personal details
- Born: 24 July 1923 Panama
- Died: 20 October 2010 (aged 87) Castries, Saint Lucia

Sir (William) George Mallet GCSL GCMG CBE (24 July 1923 – 20 October 2010) was a politician who was Governor-General of Saint Lucia and held a number of high offices in the island Saint Lucia, one of the Windward Islands of the Lesser Antilles in the Eastern Caribbean. Sir George served as the Minister for Trade, Industry, Agriculture and Tourism in the first post-independence government of St Lucia beginning in 1979. In later years, Sir George served as Deputy Prime Minister and was responsible for numerous government ministries including Foreign Affairs, Home Affairs and CARICOM Affairs.

As a member of the United Workers Party (UWP), Mallet represented the Castries Central district. He was very popular amongst his constituents and never lost the Castries Central seat during his political career. After retiring from active politics in 1996, Mallet served as Governor-General between 1 June 1996 and 31 August 1997. His wife, Beryl, died on 27 August 2003.

== Early life and political career ==
Mallet was born in Panama on 24 July 1923. His family lived in Panama for a number of years while his father was an office worker for the Panama Canal. While still very young Mallet's mother returned to Saint Lucia with her children. He acquired his education at the Roman Catholic Boys' School in Castries and at the Castries Intermediate Secondary School. Upon graduation, he joined the commercial sector, first as a clerk and later as a sales manager and accountant with leading business houses in Castries. These included Minvielle & Co., Minvielle & Chastanet and Peter & Co.

He was first elected to the Castries City Council in 1952. He served as chairman of that council until 1964. In 1958, Mallet was elected to the Saint Lucia Legislative Council to represent the constituency of Castries Central. With his growing role in the public sector and the responsibilities of the city council and the legislative council, Mallet resigned from his post as accountant with Peter & Co.

Now fully a public servant, Mallet was a member of the People's Progressive Party (PPP) and was appointed to the post of Minister for Trade, Industry, Agriculture and Tourism. At that time Saint Lucia was still under British rule and local politics were dominated by PPP and the Saint Lucia Labour Party (SLP). In 1961, amidst significant political unrest, a third political party emerged, the National Labour Movement (NLM). The NLM was led by John Compton, a former SLP member who broke away from that group to form a new political party due to the SLP's internal power struggles. In 1964, the People's Progressive Party and the National Labour Movement combined forces and formed a new party—the United Workers Party (UWP). This new party won the election held in June 1964. Mallet retained his position as Minister for Trade, Industry, Agriculture and Tourism and John Compton became Chief Minister.

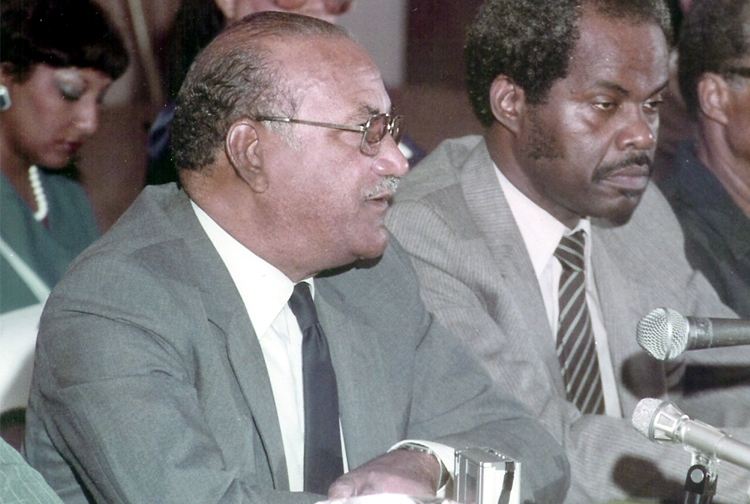
George Mallet

On 1 March 1967 Saint Lucia became an Associated State of the United Kingdom, a move closer to independence that placed the Saint Lucian government fully in charge of the island's internal affairs. The UWP continued to win the subsequent national elections and pushed for full independence; the party's platform sharply criticised the British government's administration over the island. Eventually, Saint Lucian independence was achieved on 22 February 1979. Despite some civil unrest, Saint Lucia's transition to independence was one of the most peaceful in Caribbean history and the island maintains good relations with Great Britain.

== Post-independence political career ==
Mallet continued in his role as Minister for Trade, Industry and Tourism until a few months after independence in 1979, when the United Workers Party (UWP) was defeated in national elections by the Saint Lucia Labour Party (SLP). Mallet did win the Castries Central seat in the election; but with the change of government he became a member of the opposition party in the Saint Lucia House of Assembly.

The SLP government collapsed in January 1982 and the UWP won the subsequent election in May 1982. John Compton became the island's prime minister and he named Mallet as deputy prime minister. Mallet was appointed to serve as Minister for Trade, Industry and Tourism. He held this position until 1992; after that year's national election he was named Minister for Foreign Affairs, Home Affairs, Trade and Industry. A year later, he undertook the additional responsibility of the Ministry for CARICOM Affairs.

In 1996, after 38 years of service, Mallet resigned his seat in the House of Assembly. However, before leaving office, Mallet campaigned heavily for his chosen successor to the Castries Central seat, Dr. Vaughan Lewis. Lewis, a former director of the Organisation of Eastern Caribbean States (OECS), won the Castries Central seat and assumed the office of Prime Minister on 2 April 1996.

On 1 June 1996 George Mallet was appointed to the office of Governor General. In 1997, Her Majesty Queen Elizabeth II awarded Mallet the Knight Grand Cross of St Michael and St George (GCMG) and he was given the title Sir. However, with the SLP's election victory the next year, Sir George retired from the post of Governor General on 31 August 1997.

== Death ==
Mallet died on 20 October 2010 in Castries, aged 87, after a long battle with cancer.

== Honours and awards ==
In 1996, Mallet was made Grand Cross of the Order of Saint Lucia (GCSL) in recognition of his years of service to Saint Lucia and the British Commonwealth. In 1997, Queen Elizabeth II conferred on him the honour of Knight Grand Cross of St Michael and St George (GCMG). Mallet also was honoured as a Commander of the Order of the British Empire.

The Most Distinguished Order of Saint Michael and Saint George is a British order of chivalry for men and women of high office, or who render extraordinary or important non-military service in a foreign country. The Most Excellent Order of the British Empire is a British order of chivalry bestowed for meritorious service to the government in peace as well as for gallantry in wartime.

== See also ==
- History of Saint Lucia
- Politics of Saint Lucia

Government offices
| Preceded by Sir Stanislaus A. James | Governor-General of Saint Lucia; 1996–1997 | Succeeded by Pearlette Louisy |
