= Mario Michel =

Saint Lucian lawyer and politician

Mario F. Michel (born 1960) is a Saint Lucian lawyer and politician and since 2009 has been a judge of the Eastern Caribbean Supreme Court.

Michel studied Economics and History at the University of the West Indies in Cave Hill, Barbados. He then went on to study at the Hugh Wooding Law School in Trinidad and Tobago from 1988 to 1990. In 1990 he started his own legal practice, Michel & Company , which he pursued until being elected to Parliament in 1997, representing the district of Gros Islet.

Michel is a former president of the National Youth Council and an avid bridge player who has represented the island at many tournaments. From 1997 he was part of the Prime Minister Kenny Anthony's cabinet, serving as Minister of Education, Human Resource Development, Youth and Sports and the position of Deputy Prime Minister. He presided over the establishment of Universal Secondary Education and cut a figure of principle and was sometimes construed as obdurate. His tenure was also characterised by confrontations with Saint Lucia Teachers Union some of which ended in short industrial actions.

After the executive of the Saint Lucia Labour Party voted to remove their term limit clause and effectively allow current leader, Dr Kenny Anthony to take the party into the 2006 elections he announced his intention not to partake in the General Elections of 2006. He returned to his private legal practice. There has been talk about the return of Michel to the helm of the party. He has hinted this in a recent television interview where he said coyly that he was getting many requests from people to return to politics but he was still weighing up his options.

In 2009, Michel was appointed a High Court Judge of the Eastern Caribbean Supreme Court; he was assigned to live in and hear cases from Antigua and Barbuda. In 2012, he became an Appeals Court Judge for the same court, with jurisdiction over all states of the Eastern Caribbean Supreme Court.

== See also ==
- Saint Lucia Labour Party
- Politics of Saint Lucia
