= Alain Providence =

Saint Lucian football manager

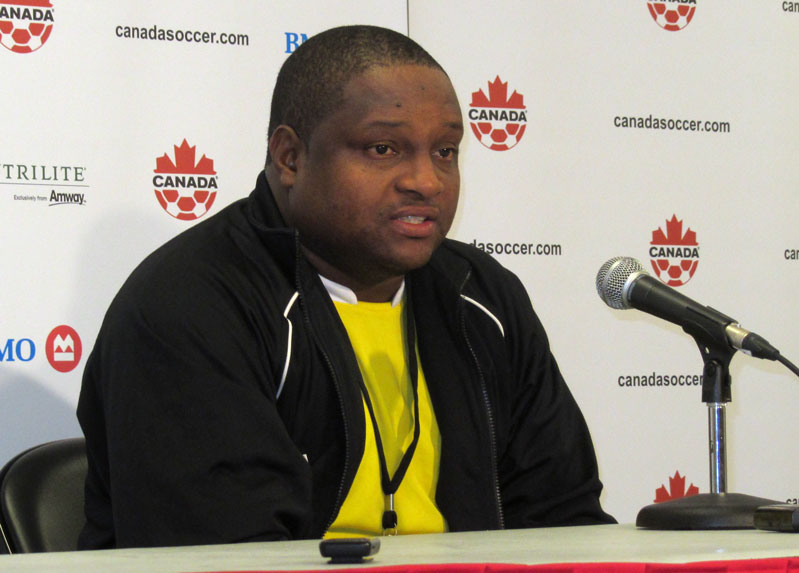

Personal information
- Date of birth: 16 August 1982 (age 44)
- Place of birth: Micoud, Saint Lucia

Managerial career
- Years: Team
- 2010–2011: Saint Lucia

Alain Providence (born 16 August 1982 in Micoud) is a Saint Lucian professional football manager.

== Career ==
Since June 2010 until December 2011 he coached the Saint Lucia national football team.
