= Velon John =

Saint Lucian politician

Velon Leo John OBE (19 April 1942 – June 13, 2025) was a Saint Lucian politician who represented the Laborie constituency for the Saint Lucia Labour Party.

John was born in Laborie. He has a law degree from University of Ottawa, Canada, and a master's degree from University of Miami.

John was a senator in the Senate of Saint Lucia from 1988 to 1990. He was appointed as Leader of the Opposition from February 1996 to May 1997.

In 2006 he served as the Minister for Labour Relations, Public Service and Co-operatives. He stood down before the general election of 11 December 2006.

John is known for his oratory skills and his wide vocabulary.
