= The Helenites =

Saint Lucian folk music group

The Helenites were a popular Saint Lucian folk music group, led by Clement Springer. The Helenites were, along with The Hewanorra Voices, one of the island's earliest popular folk stars.
