= Stephen Dantes =

Stephen Alexander Dantes is a Saint Lucian author (Poet and Novelist) and Spoken Word artiste who performed at different venues in USA, Canada and Saint Lucia. He is a youth activist and is best known for his poems, 'Fair Helen', 'Rude Boy Reality', 'The Land the People and the Bottle', 'Recreating History', 'Country Boys of Darban', 'Where I'm from there is No Freedom', 'What if Juliet Never Found Romeo' and 'Ode to Love'. Members of the Caribbean Sports fraternity also know Dantes as the co-creator of the first Caribbean Sports website, www.sportcaraibe.net, now discontinued.

== Early life ==
Dantes was born on 12 December 1982, at the Saint Jude's hospital in Vieux Fort, Saint Lucia. He resided in Darban, Choiseul until he was 16yrs, then moved to Castries. His mother, Marcella Dantes, was a housekeeper at the time. His father, Stephen Alexander Henry, left for the US Virgins Islands when Stephen was around 8 years, and though his father now lives in California, the two have not reunited face to face.

== Writing and performing ==
Dantes wrote his first poem (Life) when he was in Form-3 at the Choiseul Secondary School. In Form-5, he compiled a small notebook of reggae songs with a now deceased classmate, Aaron W. Phillip. In the first year at A'Level (2000), he wrote his second poem (Why is it I'm So Afraid?).

In February 2013, in celebration of Independence Day, Dantes offered two poems as a gift to the country, entitled, "Fair Helen" and "The Land, The People and The Bottle". He also released a comic strip where the superhero is decked in the national colours and he is seeking to engage young persons from age 10–19 will be naming the hero.

At age 29, he claimed 14 published works. 4 of these are softcover print and the other 10 are digital poetry eBooks. Most are available on Amazon.com

Dantes performed throughout St. Lucia in 2012 and also embarked on a school tour to share and give back to the youth.

Schools toured: Vide Bouteille Secondary, Choiseul Secondary, Soufriere Secondary, Saltibus Combined, and Banse La Grace Combined.

=== Performances ===
Including but not limited to:

Schools, Hotels, Bars, Cafés and Lounges, National Arts Festival, HeadPhunk, Creative Industries Launch St. Lucia, Word Alive, Annual National Telethon St. Lucia, Charity Events, Graduation Ceremonies, Saint Lucian Writers Forum, Private Party, Guest Performances, Small scale Jazz events, Poetry Slams, Various media houses, TV and Radio.

== Awards ==
Sources:

- 1999; Most Outstanding Student in Technical Drawing, (Choiseul Secondary School)
- 2006; 2nd Place Winner in Spoken Word, (St. Lucia Annual National Arts Festival)
- 2007; Winner of Award for Research for Secondary School Teacher Education, (Sir Arthur Lewis Community College, St. Lucia)
- 2010; Awarded as “Most Requested Guest Performer”, (St. Lucia Writer's Forum)
- 2011; Voice of the Youth, St. Lucia (YO! Magazine)
- 2012; Most Outstanding Youth in Literary Arts 2011 (Government of St. Lucia, National Youth Council)
- 2013; Most Outstanding Youth in Literary Arts 2012, Choiseul Youth and Sports Council
- 2013; 34th Independence Anniversary Award for Contribution to the Arts, Education District 7 – Government of St. Lucia
- 2017; Most Outstanding Teacher in Creative Arts 2016, Education District 3 - Government of St. Lucia

== Bibliography ==
- The Enchanting Excerpts
- The Last Enchantment
- Hindsight
- The love Doctor
- The Alter Ego
- Lucian Chronicles
- Silent Defeat Bitter Confrontation
- Soul mates | Confessions of a Stoic
- Letters to my Son
- Creole Chapbook 1
- Thoughts
- Exit Mic Still Hanging
- All Black Everything
- Is it Love?... a triangle gone square
  - softcover ISBN 978-1-46854-526-5
  - hardcover ISBN 978-1-46854-525-8
  - digital ISBN 978-1-46854-524-1

=== Upcoming books ===
- Is it Love? 2... Happily Never After
- Jesus and me
- Questions and Answers
- Truth Hurts
- The Dantes Philosophy of Love
