= Marius Wilson =

Saint Lucian politician

Marius Wilson is a Saint Lucian politician. He was Leader of the Opposition under the banner of UWP from 2001 to 2003. He represented the Micoud North constituency as an Independent member of parliament until December 2006.

He first ran for the constituency under the St. Lucia Labour Party. While he lost at that time, he won in the 2001 general elections. Wilson was not a candidate for the 2006 general elections. He was a former student of St.Mary's college Secondary school.
