= Ronald "Boo" Hinkson =

Saint Lucian jazz and soca guitarist (born 1951)

Ronald Hinkson
- Born: 15 September 1951 (age 74); Saint Lucia
- Genres: Jazz; soca
- Occupation: Musician
- Instrument: Guitar
- Years active: 1960s–present
- Label: Zephryn
- Formerly of: Tru Tones
- Website: rbhinkson.com

Ronald "Boo" Hinkson (born 15 September 1951) is a guitarist from Saint Lucia who combines jazz with the Caribbean genre of soca music. His mother, Iona Hinkson, played the guitar as he was growing up and is credited as his first guitar teacher. He began his career by forming the band Tru Tones. He has been praised by guitarists George Benson and Stanley Jordan. In 2016, he became the first person from Saint Lucia to be a judge at the Grammy Awards.

== Discography ==
- 2003: Beyond (Zephryn)
- 2012: Shades (Zephryn)
