= Pearlette Louisy =

5th governor-general of Saint Lucia

Dame Pearlette Louisy GCSL GCMG DStJ
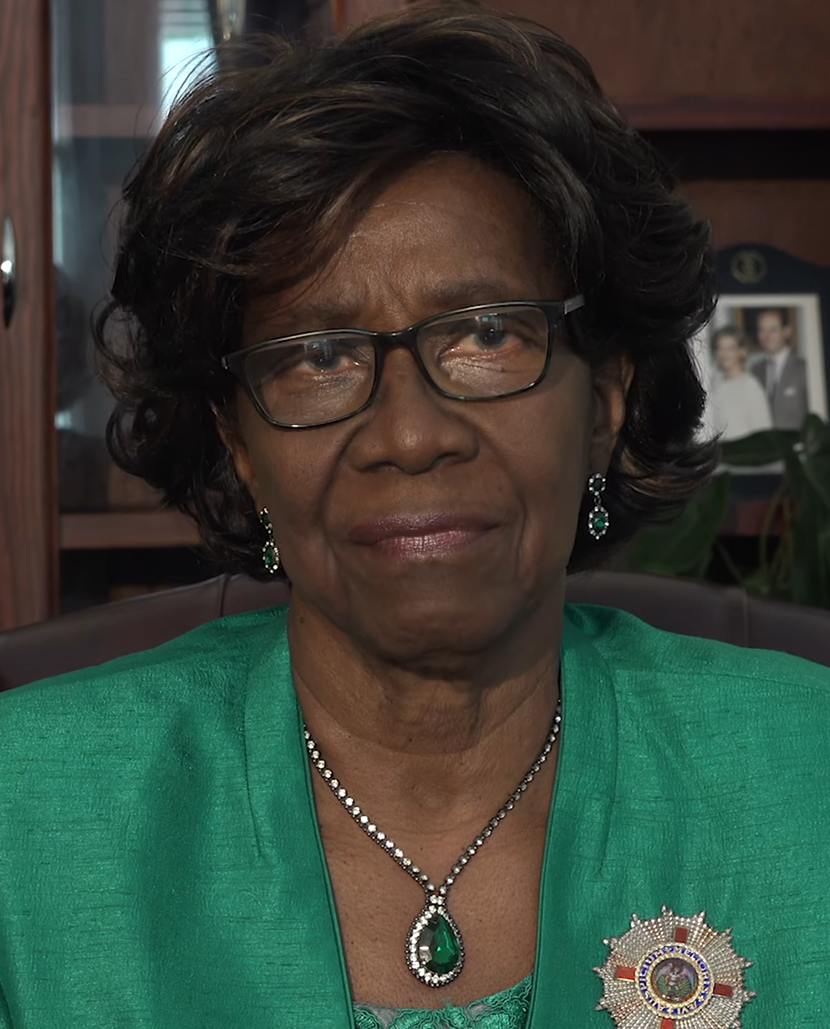
- Louisy in 2017

5th Governor-General of Saint Lucia
- In office 19 September 1997 – 31 December 2017
- Monarch: Elizabeth II
- Prime Minister: Kenny Anthony; John Compton; Stephenson King; Allen Chastanet
- Preceded by: George Mallet
- Succeeded by: Neville Cenac

Personal details
- Born: Calliopa Pearlette Louisy; 8 June 1946 (age 80) Laborie, Saint Lucia
- Education: University of the West Indies; Laval University; University of Bristol

Dame Calliopa Pearlette Louisy GCSL GCMG DStJ (born 8 June 1946) is a Saint Lucian academic, who served as governor-general of Saint Lucia from 19 September 1997, until her resignation on 31 December 2017. She is the first woman to hold the vice-regal office, as well as the longest-serving governor-general in the history of Saint Lucia.

== Biography ==
Born in the village of Laborie, Saint Lucia, Louisy attended the Laborie Infant School and Primary Schools. In 1960 she proceeded to the St. Joseph's Convent on the Javouhey Scholarship. In 1966, a year after the completion of her secondary education she was awarded the Canadian International Development Agency (CIDA) scholarship to pursue a bachelor's degree in English and French at the University of the West Indies at Cave Hill, Barbados.

In 1972, she was awarded the Canadian Commonwealth Scholarship and Fellowship Plan to pursue a M.A. degree in linguistics, in the field of Didactics at Université Laval in Quebec City, Canada. In 1991, she proceeded to the University of Bristol in the United Kingdom, where she read for a Ph.D. degree in education.

Louisy has contributed significantly to the development of Education in Saint Lucia, having spent most of her professional life in the teaching profession. During the periods 1969–72 and 1975–76, she taught at the St Joseph's Convent. From 1976 to 1986, she served as a tutor of French, and was subsequently appointed Principal of the St. Lucia A Level College. When the A Level College and Morne Technical School merged into the Sir Arthur Lewis Community College, she first served as Dean, and was subsequently appointed the Vice Principal and Principal of the college.

In 1999, Louisy was awarded the Honorary degree of Doctor of Laws (LL.D.) by the University of Bristol. On 16 July 1999, she was appointed Dame Grand Cross of the Order of St. Michael and St. George. In 2011, she received an Honorary Doctor of Laws (LLB) from the University of West Indies.

== Honours ==
=== National honours ===
- – Saint Lucia: Grand Cross of the Order of Saint Lucia (GCSL)

=== Commonwealth Honours ===
- – United Kingdom: Dame Grand Cross of the Order of St. Michael and St. George (GCMG)
- – United Kingdom: Dame of Grace of the Most Venerable Order of St. John (DStJ)

=== Papal honours ===
- – Vatican City: Dame of the Equestrian Order of St. Gregory the Great (DSG)

== See also ==
- List of governors-general of Saint Lucia
- Politics of Saint Lucia
- List of national leaders

Government offices
Preceded by George Mallet	Governor-General of Saint Lucia; 1997–2017	Succeeded by Neville Cenac
