= Suzie d'Auvergne =

Saint Lucian barrister and jurist

Suzie Agnes-Ida d'Auvergne CMG (1942 – 18 August 2014) was a Saint Lucian barrister and jurist. She was a High Court Judge of the Eastern Caribbean Supreme Court from 1990 to 2004.

D'Auvergne obtained a law degree at the University of London in 1972. She began her private law practice in 1975 and became a magistrate in 1979. She was Director of Public Prosecutions from 1982 to 1988 when she was appointed the first Solicitor General of Saint Lucia.

In 1990, d'Auvergne was appointed a High Court Judge of Eastern Caribbean Supreme Court. She retired in 2004. She was also a judge of the International Labour Organization Administrative Tribunal.

D'Auvergne received the Saint Lucia Medal of Honour for outstanding service in the cause of justice in 2004. In 2006, she was awarded the Companion of the Order of St Michael and St George (CMG) for service to the judiciary.

D'Auvergne died at Tapion Hospital in Castries on 18 August 2014.
