= Folk Research Centre =

The Msgr. Patrick Anthony Folk Research Centre (FRC, Plas Wíchès Foklò) of Saint Lucia has studied and promoted the local music of Saint Lucia since its foundation in 1973. It was established by a Catholic priest, named Patrick Anthony in 1973 alongside a multi-faith group of young people.

Since 1990, it has published a journal called Lucian Kaiso.

== Folk Research Center fire ==
On Sunday 27 March 2018fire destroyed many the contents of the Folk Research Center. The FRC continues in its new location at Barnard Hill in Castries.
