= Stanislaus A. James =

Saint Lucian educator and former governor-general (1919–2011)

Sir Stanislaus James GCMG OBE

3rd Governor-General of Saint Lucia
- In office October 10, 1988 – June 1, 1996
- Monarch: Elizabeth II
- Prime Minister: John Compton; Vaughan Lewis
- Preceded by: Allen Montgomery Lewis
- Succeeded by: George Mallet

Personal details
- Born: November 13, 1919 Soufrière, Saint Lucia
- Died: May 26, 2011 (aged 91) Castries, St. Lucia
- Education: Saint Mary's College

Sir Stanislaus Anthony James GCMG OBE (November 13, 1919 – May 26, 2011) was a Saint Lucian educator, administrator, and former governor-general.

Stanislaus Anthony James was born in Soufrière and educated at Saint Mary's College, Saint Lucia. He qualified as a teacher at Trinidad Training College for Teachers in 1941 and taught in Saint Lucia for several years. Later he became a government administrator and obtained a Diploma in Social Administration from Swansea University, Wales, in 1960 and a Diploma in Public Administration from Carleton University, Ottawa, in 1968. He was a senior administrator in several Saint Lucian government departments. He was the Governor-General of Saint Lucia from October 10, 1988 to June 1, 1996. Sir Stanislaus Anthony James Building is located on the Waterfront in Castries the capital and largest city of Saint Lucia.

== Early life and education ==
Sir Stanislaus Anthony James was born in the town of Soufriere on 13 November 1919. He acquired his early education in Soufriere and proceeded to the St. Mary's College from 1934 to 1939. He received the Cambridge Senior Certificate upon his graduation. He spent a school term at the St. Aloysius R. C Boys' school as a temporary teacher, after which he left for Trinidad in 1940 to pursue his studies at the Training College for Teachers. In December 1941, he successfully completed his training and was awarded the Trained Teacher's Certificate.

== Career ==
In January 1942, he was appointed a trained assistant teacher on the staff of the Soufriere Boys' Primary School. In June 1944, he was appointed as supervising teacher for the in-service training of unqualified teachers, the first supervising teacher for the training of unqualified teachers. He travelled by horse to the rural schools and by canoe to the coastal villages of Canaries and Anse-La-Raye.

In 1945, Sir Stanislaus James was transferred to the education department in Castries as head of a small number of supervising teachers who covered the entire island.

In 1946, after studying through correspondence, he was successful in obtaining the Diploma of Associate of the College of Preceptors (ACP) London, the first Saint Lucian to obtain a Diploma in Education.

Sir Stanislaus stands out as the key architect in the establishment, organisation and development of St. Lucia. It is he who was responsible for conceptualising and implementing youth development and community programs and projects which saw the establishment of youth clubs, sports and community centres and playing fields island wide. Over the years, his work as Head of the Departments dealing with probation, social welfare, community development, public relations and poor relief has laid the foundation and structure for activities which are today the shared responsibility of the Department of Human Services and the Ministry of Legal Affairs.

He also played a major role in the establishment of the National Provident Fund Scheme, which is the precursor to the social security program of the National Insurance Scheme. So indispensable were his services that in 1974 he was brought out of retirement by the Government to establish a framework for disaster preparedness in St. Lucia and was responsible for the designing of the first comprehensive National Disaster Plan.

In 1988, Sir Stanislaus was appointed to act as Governor-General. In 1992, he was appointed Governor – General, a position he held until 31 May 1996.

== Honours and awards ==
Sir Stanislaus was the recipient of numerous awards:

- 1973 – Member of the Most Excellent Order of the British Empire (MBE)
- 1985 – Officer of the Most Excellent Order of the British Empire (OBE)
- 1990 – Companion of the Most Distinguished Order of St. Michael and St. George (CMG)
- 1992 – Knight Grand Cross of the Order of St. Michael and St. George (GCMG)
- 1992 – Grand Cross of the Order of St. Lucia (GCSL)

== Family ==
- Michael James
- Raymond James
- Pauline James
- Gillian James

== Death ==
Sir Stanislaus Anthony James of Sunny Acres, died at his residence on Thursday, 30 May 2011. He was 91 years.
