= Robert Kennedy Lewis =

Saint Lucian politician

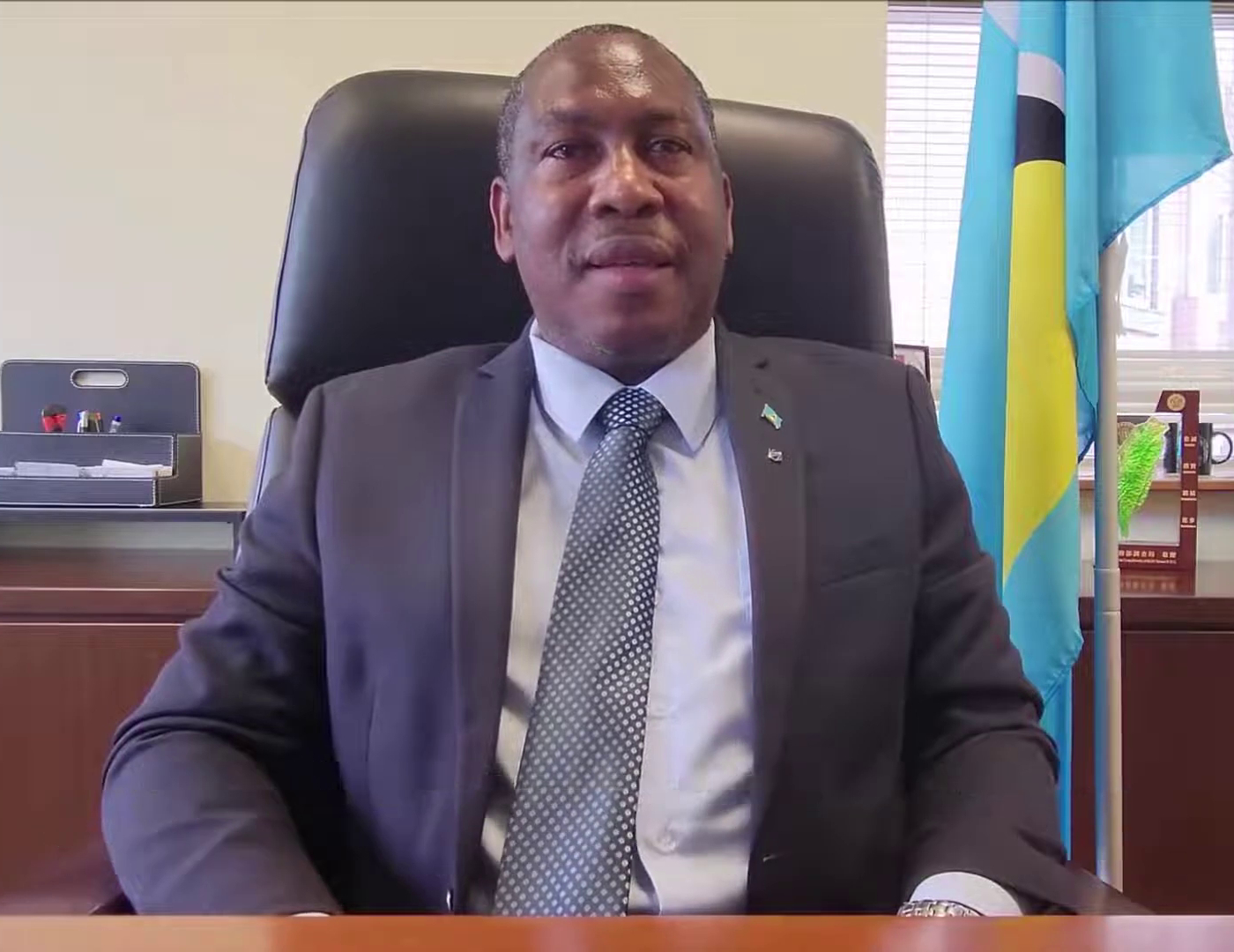
Lewis in Taipei on 4 September 2022

Robert Kennedy Lewis is a St Lucian politician affiliated with the Saint Lucia Labour Party. He was elected to the House of Assembly of Saint Lucia following the election of 11 December 2006 as the member of parliament for Castries South. Previous to his election Lewis was supervisor and examiner of National Examinations in Mathematics from 1992 to 2006. In January 2005 he received a Phd in mathematics from the University of Otago.

Lewis presented diplomatic credentials to Joseph Wu, foreign minister of the Republic of China on 20 April 2022, and succeeded Edwin Laurent, who had served as St Lucian ambassador to the Republic of China since May 2018. Lewis presented his diplomatic credentials to president Tsai Ing-wen on 5 May 2022.
