= Tru Tones =

Saint Lucian band

The Tru Tones were a Saint Lucian band led by Ronald "Boo" Hinkson. Hinkson formed the band in the 1960s, with the members mostly being his brothers and friends. The Tru Tones were "extremely popular" in the Caribbean in the 1970s. The group also had a following in the 1970s in the United Kingdom. The band performed at the Super Bowl XIII halftime show in 1979. They recorded five albums and six singles, most famously "Burning Eyes and Hungry Bellies" and "You Sexy Thing" (a remake of the Hot Chocolate song).

Since the Tru Tones broke up in 1980, Hinkson has had a successful solo career and toured across the world.

== Discography ==
- Tru-Tones Combo of St. Lucia (1968)
- Cream of the Crop (1971)
- Show The World (1974)
- Merry Christmas From The Tru-Tones (1975)
- The Leaders (1977)
- Power Struggle (1980)
