= Louis George (politician) =

Saint Lucian politician

Louis Bertrand George (10 October 1950 – 2 January 2014) was a Saint Lucian politician. He was elected to the House of Assembly representing Micoud North constituency in 1982. He was a member of the United Workers Party.

George was Minister for Education from 1982 to 1997. He was Deputy Prime Minister in the cabinet of Vaughan Lewis. Following the 1997 elections, he was Leader of the Parliamentary Opposition from 1997 to 2001.

He was awarded the Saint Lucia Cross for contribution to national development in 2009.
