= Joyce Auguste =

Saint Lucian musician

Denise Joyce Auguste (1944–2020) was a Saint Lucian musician and leader of The Hewanorra Voices, which became a major popular folk band in the 1970s.

Auguste also worked as music supervisor for the Saint Lucian school system and introduced folk music into the school curriculum. In 1978, her photograph received the honor of being included on the ten cent stamp of Saint Lucia. In 1988, she became a Member of the Most Excellent Order of the British Empire, later being given the Most Excellent Order of the British Empire (O.B.E.) in 2017.

She died on 21 May 2020 at the age of 76 in her home due to natural causes. Following her death, the Government of St. Lucia held a state funeral on June 24. She was interred at the Choc Cemetery.
