= The Hewanorra Voices =

The Hewanorra Voices were a Lucian folk music ensemble, led by Joyce Auguste. They emerged in the 1970s, and were one of the premier groups of the Lucian roots revival, along with The Helenites. Their recordings include 1974's St. Lucia Jems and 1980's All Year Round With The Hewanorra Voices, both released by West Indies Records.
