= Aimran Simmons =

Aimran Simmons is a Saint Lucian musician, a pan player and leader of a musical experiment called Panergy. He began performing at fourteen years old, with the Diamond Steel Orchestra, and then studied at the Saint Lucia School of Music. As a solo pianist, he began performing after leaving school, and worked with several local musical celebrities, like Boo Hinckson, and has toured the Caribbean, North America and Germany. The well-known calypsonian, hammer composed a tribute to Simmons called "Panman Aimran"; the song's title has become Simmons' nickname among his fans.
