= Clement Springer =

Saint Lucian musician

Clement Springer is a Saint Lucian folk musician and folklorist, leader of a group called The Helenites. He is also a leader of the Saint Lucia Cultural Organization.
