= Jonel Scott =

Saint Lucian-American basketball player (born 1992)

Jonel Scott (born January 5, 1992, in Gros Islet, Saint Lucia), is a 6' 8" basketball player. He emigrated to the United States of America in 2009 where he played basketball at Boys and Girls High School in Brooklyn, New York. He was a member of the ESPN Rise National team, 2011.

He then played center in Wildcats, the basketball program of State University of New York Institute of Technology (SUNYIT) in UticaRome where Scott majored in Computer Engineering Technology.
