= Vaughan Lewis =

Former Prime Minister of Saint Lucia

The Honourable Sir Vaughan Lewis KCSL CBE

5th Prime Minister of Saint Lucia
- In office 2 April 1996 – 24 May 1997
- Monarch: Elizabeth II
- Governors-General: Stanislaus A. James; George Mallet
- Deputy: Louis George
- Preceded by: John Compton
- Succeeded by: Kenny Anthony

Personal details
- Born: Vaughan Allen Lewis; 17 May 1940 (age 85)
- Party: Saint Lucia Labour Party
- Other political affiliations: United Workers Party (until 2006)
- Spouse: Shirley Lewis
- Relatives: Allen Montgomery Lewis (father); W. Arthur Lewis (uncle)

Sir Vaughan Allen Lewis, KCSL CBE (born 17 May 1940), is a Saint Lucian politician and a former member of the United Workers' Party (UWP). He served for a brief period as the fifth Prime Minister of Saint Lucia following the resignation of John Compton. Lewis, a former director of the Organisation of Eastern Caribbean States, assumed the office of Prime Minister on 2 April 1996. He also served as Minister of Finance, Planning and Development, and Minister of External Affairs. In elections that followed on 23 May 1997, Lewis and the UWP suffered a huge setback, losing all but one of their seats in Parliament, forcing him to resign in favor of the leader of the Saint Lucia Labour Party, Dr Kenny Anthony.

Compton defeated Lewis for the UWP leadership in a party conference in Soufrière on 13 March 2005. Compton received 260 votes against 135 for Lewis.

Following this defeat, Lewis resigned from the United Workers Party and joined the Saint Lucia Labour Party. On 7 September 2006, the executive of the Saint Lucia Labour Party endorsed Dr Vaughan Lewis as its candidate for the Castries Central constituency in the December 2006 general election.

Lewis' defection to Labour was controversial. After losing two general elections in a row, Lewis had the opportunity to win the Castries Central seat in a February 2006 by-election. He then told UWP supporters first that he was the endorsed candidate. He then told them that he was taking time to make up his mind. Finally, he quit the UWP all together and said that he was no longer interested in electoral politics. However, Lewis had been in talks with high-ranking members of the Saint Lucia Labour Party about his defection since he was defeated by Compton in the leadership contest.

More troubling for Labour's top strategists was that Lewis had brought Desmond Brathwaite into the party with him. Brathwaite is best known as the Women's Affairs Minister who was charged with kicking his wife down a flight of stairs in 1994. He was terribly unpopular but became so close to Lewis in 1996 that when asked why he didn't drop Brathwaite for political reasons, Lewis replied, "I'd rather lose with Brathwaite than win without him." It led to the most crushing defeat in St Lucian political history. There were two other candidates, one of whom, then Senator Petra Nelson, subsequently left the Saint Lucia Labour Party to campaign for the United Workers Party in the 2006 general elections.

Labour described Lewis as a Caribbean citizen and intellectual who was opposed by Sir John Compton.

Lewis failed in his bid to win the Castries Central parliamentary seat from the UWP candidate Richard Frederick in the 2006 general elections held on 11 December. Lewis returned to academia and was a professor at the University of the West Indies, St Augustine Campus, in Trinidad and Tobago. He has returned to St. Lucia occasionally to appear on the platform of the St Lucia Labour Party. He was chosen as part of a task force to explore the possibility of a union between Trinidad and Tobago and The Organisation of Eastern Caribbean States. After the St Lucia Labour Party government returned to office in 2011, Lewis became a special advisor in the Ministry of Foreign Affairs

He is married to lawyer Shirley Lewis, a Barbadian native and former Mayor of Castries. He is part of the prominent Lewis clan, son of St. Lucia's first Governor General, Sir Allen Lewis, and nephew of Sir Arthur Lewis, Nobel laureate in economics. Vaughan Lewis earned a PhD in political science from the University of Manchester in 1970.

In February 2016, to mark St Lucia Independence Day, Lewis became one of the first knights of the Order of Saint Lucia, granting him the title of "Sir".

== See also ==
- List of prime ministers of Saint Lucia
- Politics of Saint Lucia

Political offices
Preceded by John Compton	Prime Minister of Saint Lucia; 1996–1997	Succeeded by Kenny Anthony
