= Allen Montgomery Lewis =

Saint Lucian judge (1909–1993)

Sir Allen Montgomery Lewis GCMG GCVO KStJ

1st Governor-General of Saint Lucia
- In office 22 February 1979 – 19 June 1980
- Monarch: Elizabeth II
- Prime Minister: John Compton; Allan Louisy
- Preceded by: Position established Himself (as governor)
- Succeeded by: Boswell Williams
- In office 13 December 1982 – 30 April 1987
- Monarch: Elizabeth II
- Prime Minister: John Compton
- Preceded by: Boswell Williams
- Succeeded by: Stanislaus A. James

Governor of Saint Lucia
- In office 1974–1979
- Monarch: Elizabeth II
- Preceded by: Ira Marcus Simmons
- Succeeded by: Position abolished Himself (as governor-general)

Personal details
- Born: 26 October 1909
- Died: 18 February 1993 (aged 83)
- Relations: Vaughan Lewis (son); W. Arthur Lewis (brother)
- Education: Saint Mary's College; London University; Middle Temple

Sir Allen Montgomery Lewis GCMG GCVO KStJ (26 October 1909 – 18 February 1993) was a Saint Lucian barrister and public servant who twice served as the country's Governor-General.

== Early life ==
Lewis was born in Castries, St Lucia, where he was educated at the Castries Anglican Infant and Primary Schools and Saint Mary's College. He then studied law at London University and the Middle Temple.

He became a member of Castries City Council in 1941, acting as Chairman six times. He was one of the founders and the first president of the Saint Lucia Labour Party in 1950. Before his appointments to the viceregal post, Sir Allen sat on the legislative council (1943–1951) and was a senator in the Federal Parliament of the West Indies Federation (1958–1959).

Lewis had a distinguished legal career alongside his political accomplishments; he was a judge on the Jamaican Court of Appeal (1962–1967) and the first Chief Justice of the West Indies Associated States Supreme Court (1967–1972). In 1975 he became Chancellor of the University of the West Indies.

In 1972, he returned to Saint Lucia and spent two years establishing a National Development Corporation to develop the economy of the island, after which he was appointed Governor of Saint Lucia, the Queen's representative. When St Lucia gained independence in 1979, Lewis served twice in the equivalent role as Governor-General of Saint Lucia (1979–1980 and 1982–1987).

His brother, W. Arthur Lewis, won the Nobel Memorial Prize in Economics for his work on developing countries and the "Lewis turning point".

== Honours and awards ==
- 1952: Awarded the Coronation Medal.
- 1968: Made Knight Bachelor.
- 1974: Awarded honorary degree of Doctor of Laws by the University of the West Indies.
- 1975: Made a Knight of the Order of Saint John of Jerusalem.
- 1977: Awarded the Jubilee Medal.
- 1979: Made a Knight Grand Cross of the Order of Saint Michael and Saint George (GCMG).
- 1985: Awarded the Grand Cross of the Royal Victorian Order (GCVO).

Government offices
Preceded by Sir Ira Simmons	Governor of Saint Lucia; 1974–1979	Created Governor-General
New title	Governor-General of Saint Lucia; 1979–1980	Succeeded by Boswell Williams
Preceded by Boswell Williams	Governor-General of Saint Lucia; 1982–1987	Succeeded by Vincent Floissac, acting
