= Kenny Anthony =

Saint Lucian politician (born 1951)

The Honourable Dr. Kenny Anthony MP
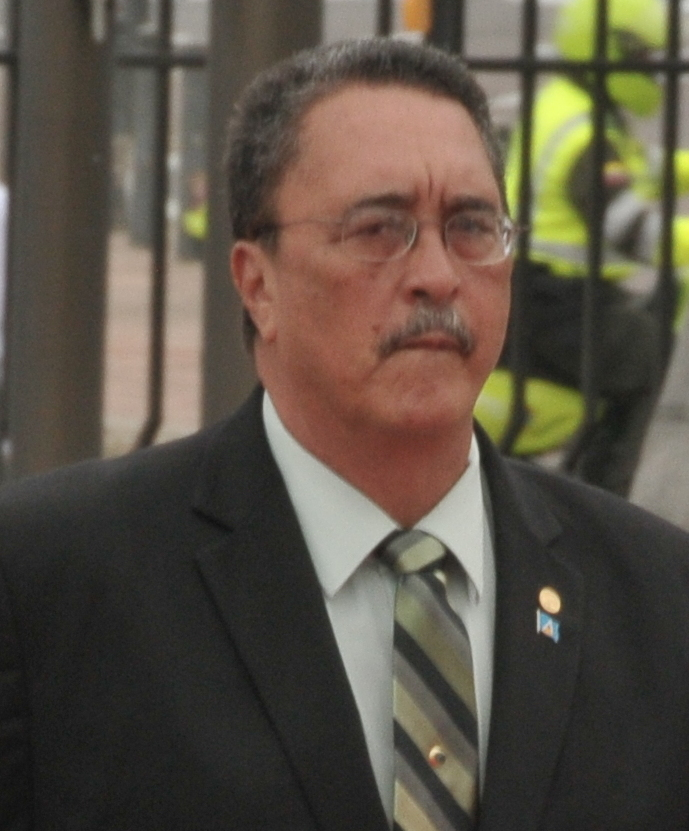

6th Prime Minister of Saint Lucia
- In office 30 November 2011 – 7 June 2016
- Monarch: Elizabeth II
- Deputy: Philip J. Pierre
- Governor General: Pearlette Louisy
- Preceded by: Stephenson King
- Succeeded by: Allen Chastanet
- In office 24 May 1997 – 15 December 2006
- Monarch: Elizabeth II
- Deputy: Mario Michel
- Governor General: George Mallet; Pearlette Louisy
- Preceded by: Vaughan Lewis
- Succeeded by: John Compton

Personal details
- Born: 8 January 1951 (age 75) Laborie, Saint Lucia
- Party: Labour Party
- Spouse: Rose-Marie Belle Antoine
- Education: University of the West Indies at Cave Hill; University of Birmingham

Kenny Davis Anthony (born 8 January 1951) is a Saint Lucian politician who was Prime Minister of Saint Lucia from 1997 to 2006 and again from 2011 to 2016. As leader of the Saint Lucia Labour Party, he was Leader of the Opposition from 2006 to 2011 and returned to office as Prime Minister on 30 November 2011 following the 2011 election. He left office after the SLP's defeat in the 2016 election and announced his resignation as party leader.

== Political career ==
Anthony is a graduate of the University of the West Indies at Cave Hill and the University of Birmingham. In the Labour government that led the country from 1979 to 1982, Anthony was Special Advisor to the Ministry of Education and Culture from August 1979 to December 1980, then Minister of Education from December 1980 to March 1981. He was a member of the secretariat of the Caribbean Community (CARICOM) from March 1995 until he was elected leader of the Labour Party.

He became Prime Minister on 24 May 1997, a day after the SLP won parliamentary elections. While Prime Minister, he was also the Minister of Finance and Broadcasting.

During his leadership and his party's reign, Anthony led St. Lucia to record development in tourism, infrastructure and general economic development. However, imbalances in the economic development, disenfranchisement and raising crime levels are challenges his administration had difficulty to tackle. Since he regained power in 2011 there has been an increase in the number of impoverish persons on the island. Together with much economic development came steady increases in violent crime at a rate higher than many neighbouring islands and that caused many to draw comparisons with Jamaica and Trinidad and Tobago.

Kenny D. Anthony is an Honorary Member of the International Raoul Wallenberg Foundation.

== General election defeat ==
In the general elections held on 11 December 2006, the SLP suffered a surprise defeat by 11 seats to 6 at the hands of the John Compton-led UWP. While the SLP lost the election by 5 seats, the popular vote margin was in fact very slim, just over 2000 votes.

Anthony himself won a handsome victory in his constituency, Vieux Fort South, winning by 627 votes, only a few less than in the SLP's landslide election victory. Anthony remained head of the party and assumed the role of Leader of the Opposition.

Further, the reaction of many voters to the crossing over of former UWP leader Vaughan Lewis to the SLP was not positive. Lewis was a staunch opponent of the Labour government and the former Prime Minister who had lost the elections to the SLP - albeit after being handed the post only one year before the fateful loss. Anthony and Lewis have both stated publicly that all the "bad blood" between them was now "water under the bridge".

In late July 2007, Anthony said that Compton's illness, caused by a series of strokes, and his inability to perform his duties - Stephenson King was named acting Prime Minister - meant that a new election should be held. Anthony was head of the Commonwealth of Nations observer mission in the August 2007 election in Sierra Leone. He gave the election a positive appraisal.

In March 2008, Anthony visited Cuba where he voiced his appreciation for its support of Saint Lucia. He toured Havana and Cienfuegos Province, and met with senior officials including First Vice President José Ramón Machado Ventura.

Anthony was returned to Prime Ministership on 30 November 2011 following the Saint Lucia Labour Party electoral win at the 2011 elections, winning 11 out of the 17 seats in Parliament.

Following the general elections on 6 June 2016 in which the SLP lost by 11 seats to six, Anthony announced that he would step down as party leader. He was re-elected in his constituency of Vieux Fort South and said that he would remain in Parliament.

Political offices
Preceded by Vaughan Lewis	Prime Minister of Saint Lucia; 1997–2006	Succeeded by John Compton
Preceded by Stephenson King	Prime Minister of Saint Lucia; 2011–2016	Succeeded by Allen Chastanet
