= Even tot hier =

- Genre: Satire; Current affairs Music
- Created by: Niels van der Laan; Jeroen Woe
- Written by: Niels van der Laan; Jeroen Woe; Hans Riemens; Peter Capel; Peter Heerschop; Emilio Guzman; Owen Schumacher; Armèn Hakhverdian; Maarten Hopman
- Presented by: Niels van der Laan; Jeroen Woe
- Starring: Miguel Wiels; Romana de Meneges (2021–present); Matteo Paggi (2022–present); David Mast (2022–present)
- Country of origin: Netherlands
- Original language: Dutch
- No. of seasons: 16
- No. of episodes: 104; 6 compilation specials

Production
- Production location: Studio 11, Almere
- Running time: 45–52 minutes
- Production company: MediaLane

Original release
- Network: BNNVARA (NPO 1)
- Release: 16 March 2019 – present

Even tot hier is a Dutch satirical news show created and presented by comic duo Van der Laan & Woe, with musical assistance by Miguel Wiels. Premiering in March 2019, it is broadcast weekly on Saturdays at 21:30 by BNNVARA on NPO 1.

== Background ==
After Van der Laan & Woe presented De Kwis (from 2013 until 2018), they wanted to continue making satirical television. This resulted in the creation of Even tot hier.

Production takes place at Studio 11 in Almere. Episodes are filmed in the afternoon and broadcast the same day at 21:30 on NPO 1.

In the first two seasons, a musical parody was performed, referring to a news topic from the week prior. Also, each episode featured three experts explaining a topic.

In 2020, after the COVID-19 pandemic started, the format was changed. Audience was not allowed in the studio, but a big screen was placed opposite the stage where audience members could attend the broadcast through a video call. The musical parody performance was removed. Instead, Van der Laan and Woe perform their own smaller musical parody. From this third season onwards, each episode ends with someone being cheered up or someone getting support.

From the sixth season onwards, audience was able to return to the studio. Previously made changes remained.

The show won the Gouden Televizier-Ring in 2022 (for season 6 and 7) and the Ere Zilveren Nipkowschrijf in 2023.

During season 14, the show organised a fundraiser for Transport Ambulances To Ukraine with the website TATU.nu. The fundraiser was created for the existing organisation Stichting Music for Ukraine. The fundraiser raised money for ambulances to be sent to Ukrainian victims of the Russian invasion. Stichting Music for Ukrainen initiator and accordeonist Oleg Lysenko opened the fundraiser with a song and was present in each episode. In the season finale, it was revealed that more than €3.1 million was raised, with 19 ambulances with equipment being sent to Ukraine. As of May 2026, the fundraiser is still active, and so far, 64 ambulances have been sent to Ukraine. For this fundraiser, Even tot hier won the Televizier-Ring Impact award in October 2026.

== Format ==
The first 30–35 minutes are spent satirically discussing the news of the past week. Throughout, several songs are performed, all relating to a news topic.

- Presenters Van der Laan and Woe perform a song which is typically an existing song with the lyrics being altered. These songs are sometimes performed together with a children's ensemble.
- Van der Laan and Woe also perform a so-called "Simpel Liedje" ("Simple Song"), a song which is always a minute long. They always introduce the song as "een heel simpel leidje, over een best wel ingewikkeld onderwerp" ("a very simple song about a very difficult topic"). Van der Laan and Woe often performed a "Simpel Liedje" at large events, such as the opening concert in celebration of the 750th birthday of Amsterdam, where they summarised the history of the Dutch capital in one minute. For seasons 8, 10 and 12, the season finale was where they performed the song summarising the whole past year. From the 100th episode (2026) onwards, "Simpel Liedje" was replaced by a similar short song, performed with a ukelele.
- A surprise musical guest performs a parody of one of their own songs, typically with the lyrics being altered to refer to the last news topic that was discussed earlier. Until season 13, Van der Laan and Woe would be interrupted by Wiels who suggests that something Van der Laan or Woe said, is the title of a famous song, while that's not the case. Then, one of the hosts announces the artist. In season 14, the guest was revealed using "The Musked Singer" (as a parody of The Masked Singer), with the artist wearing a mask with the face of Elon Musk. Throughout the episode, a few hints (leading to the identity of the artist) are dropped. Eventually, Wiels suggests that he is certain who it is, explaining the hints leading to his guess.

The last 10–15 minutes are spent hosting a quiz for the audience. All questions (except for the last one) are multiple choice. When someone answers wrong, they are eliminated. When there are just a few people left, a final estimation question is asked. The winner, with the answer closest to the correct answer, is crowned 'the all-knowing'. They then make a wish, typically supporting or cheering up someone who experienced problems earlier. Those people are usually interviewed by Van der Laan and Woe earlier in the episode.

== Episodes ==
=== Season 1 (2019) ===
Episode	Episode (overall)	Musical guest	"Simpel Liedje"	Air date (2019)	Ratings (in millions)
1	1	Syb van der Ploeg	The backstop	16 March	1.078
2	2	Ben Cramer	The pension system	23 March	1.047
3	3	Stef Bos	Article 13	30 March	0.977
4	4	Peter de Koning	Grocery store prices	6 April	1.067
5	5	Lee Towers	Tariffs on cheese	13 April	0.986
6	6	Gerard Cox	Julian Assange	20 April	1.032
7	7	Frans Bauer	Binnenhof renovation	27 April	1.168

=== Season 2 (2019) ===
Episode	Episode (overall)	Musical guest	"Simpel Liedje"	Air date (2019)	Ratings (in millions)
1	8	Harry Slinger	The past 9 years	19 October	1.012
2	9	Henk Westbroek	Winter time shift	26 October	1.102
3	10	Trafassi	Speed limits	2 November	1.138
4	11	Danny de Munk	Income inequality	9 November	1.131
5	12	Jeroen van der Boom	Hong Kong	16 November	0.707
6	13	Jacques Herb	The salmon war	23 November	1.217
7	14	Nol Havens	Transition allowance in politics	30 November	1.033

=== Season 3 (2020) ===
Episode	Episode (overall)	Musical guest(s)	"Simpel Liedje"	Air date (2020)	Ratings (in millions)
1	15	John de Bever	Fittie 50+	25 April	1.220
2	16	—N/a	Morocco	2 May	1.282
3	17	Paul de Munnik	DENK	9 May	1.140
4	18	Kenny B	—N/a	17 May (Note: This episode was filmed and broadcast on a Sunday due to Eurovision: Europe Shine a Light being broadcast live on Saturday.)	1.575
5	19	Simone Kleinsma; Paul de Leeuw	Dries Roelvink	23 May	1.325
6	20	Edsilia Rombley	Cummings	30 May	1.212
7	21	Anita Doth	Elon Musk	6 June	1.375

=== Season 4 (2020) ===
Episode	Episode (overall)	Musical guest(s)	"Simpel Liedje"	Air date (2020)	Ratings (in millions)
1	22	MEROL	The fitties of Erdoğan	31 October	1.430
2	23	Suzan & Freek	Wopke Hoekstra and KLM	7 November	1.406
3	24	Miranda van Kralingen; Gordon	Firework ban	14 November	1.397
4	25	Xander de Buisonjé	Acceptance obligation	21 November	1.331
5	26	Martin Buitenhuis	Mandatory face masks	28 November	1.535
6	27	T-Spoon	2022 FIFA World Cup	12 December	1.528
7	28	Youp van 't Hek	Trump to prison	19 December	1.465

=== Season 5 (2021) ===
Episode	Episode (overall)	Musical guest(s)	"Simpel Liedje"	Air date (2021)	Ratings (in millions)
1	29	Trijntje Oosterhuis	Covid variants	20 March	1.675
2	30	Maxine; Franklin Brown	Evening curfew	27 March	1.846
3	31	Henny Huisman	Bibian Mentel	3 April	1.877
4	32	Guus Meeuwis	Ahold Delhaize	10 April	1.902
5	33	K3	Self testing COVID-19	17 April	1.652
6	34	Chef'Special	For Putin	24 April	1.786
7	35	Brainpower	AstraZeneca	1 May	1.739

=== Season 6 (2021) ===
Episode	Episode (overall)	Musical guest(s)	"Simpel Liedje"	Air date (2021)	Ratings (in millions)
1	36	Roel van Velzen	2021-2022 cabinet formation	6 November	1.470
2	37	Wolter Kroes	Booster dose	14 November (Note: This episode was filmed and broadcast on a Sunday.)	1.552
3	38	Do	1, 2 or 3G	20 November	1.795
4	39	Clouseau	Triage	27 November	1.818
5	40	Milow	Doutzen Kroes	4 December	2.006
6	41	Anita Meyer; Lee Towers	King Willem-Alexander's real estate	11 December	2.116
7	42	Nielson	Immigration detention	18 December	2.301

=== Season 7 (2022) ===
Episode	Episode (overall)	Musical guest(s)	"Simpel Liedje"	Air date (2022)	Ratings (in millions)
1	43	Brigitte Kaandorp; Herman Finkers	Johan Derksen	15 May (Note: This episode was filmed and broadcast on a Sunday, due to the grand final of the Eurovision Song Contest 2022 being broadcast live on Saturday.)	1.847
2	44	Loïs Lane	Sweden and Finland joining NATO	21 May	1.767
3	45	MEAU	Monkeypox virus	28 May	1.367
4	46	—N/a (Note: Flemming was set to perform a variant of his song "Amsterdam", but couldn't attend. Instead, Van der Laan and Woe performed the song.)	Dutch childcare benefits scandal Institutional racism	4 June	1.471
5	47	André van Duin	Ongehoord Nederland	12 June	1.657
6	48	Astrid Nijgh	Sywert van Lienden	18 June	1.523

=== Season 8 (2022) ===
Episode	Episode (overall)	Musical guest	"Simpel Liedje"	Air date (2022)	Ratings (in millions)
1	49	K-otic	The price ceiling	12 November	1.922
2	50	Paul de Leeuw	TikTok	19 November	1.781
3	51	Jody Bernal	NS	26 November	1.527
4	52	Lenny Kuhr	Apology for slavery	3 December	1.767
5	53	Rondé	Abortion pill	10 December	1.636
6	54	Jenny Arean	2022	17 December	1.916

=== Season 9 (2023) ===
Episode	Episode (overall)	Musical guest	"Simpel Liedje"	Air date (2023)	Ratings (in millions)
1	55	Tino Martin	E. Jean Carroll v. Donald J. Trump	8 April	1.809
2	56	Toontje Lager	10 years of King Willem-Alexander	15 April	1.543
3	57	Gerard Cox	AI	22 April	1.733
4	58	Jeangu Macrooy	Joe Biden rerunning for POTUS	29 April	1.699
5	59	Peter Koelewijn	Coronation of Charles III	6 May	1.782
6	60	Rowwen Hèze	Mia & Dion	14 May (Note: This episode was filmed and broadcast on a Sunday, due to the grand final of the Eurovision Song Contest 2023 being broadcast live on Saturday.)	2.122
7	61	Imca Marina	Flash delivery	20 May	1.998

=== Season 10 (2023) ===
Episode	Episode (overall)	Musical guest(s)	"Simpel Liedje"	Air date (2023)	Ratings (in millions)
1	62	Alain Clark	Qatar	11 November	2.898
2	63	VOF de Kunst	Old politics	19 November (Note: This episode was filmed and broadcast on a Sunday due to a UEFA European Football Championship qualification match being broadcast live on Saturday.)	2.728
3	64	Harrie Jekkers	Thierry Baudet in Groningen	25 November	2.652
4	65	Bonnie St. Claire; Ron Brandsteder	Gom van Strien	2 December	2.658
5	66	Jamai Loman	Sultan Ahmed Al Jaber	9 December	2.578
6	67	Snelle; Louisa Janssen	Constitution of the Netherlands	16 December	2.563
7	68	2 Brothers on the 4th Floor	2023	23 December	2.653

=== Season 11 (2024) ===
Episode	Episode (overall)	Musical guest	"Simpel Liedje"	Air date (2024)	Ratings (in millions)
1	69	Re-Play	2023–2024 cabinet formation	6 April	2.476
2	70	Abel	Substance X	13 April	2.479
3	71	Roberto Jacketti & the Scooters	Binnenhof renovation	20 April	2.418
4	72	Typhoon	Measles	27 April	2.250
5	73	Emma Heesters	Ronnie Flex and Anouk	4 May	2.387
6	74	Getty Kaspers	Prosecution of Donald Trump	12 May (Note: This episode was filmed and broadcast on a Sunday, due to the grand final of the Eurovision Song Contest 2024 being broadcast live on Saturday.)	2.111
7	75	Marco Schuitmaker	2024 European Parliament election	18 May	2.368

=== Season 12 (2024) ===
Episode	Episode (overall)	Musical guest	"Simpel Liedje"	Air date (2024)	Ratings (in millions)
1	76	Rolf Sanchez	Netflix	9 November	2.348
2	77	Yves Berendse	Ministries changing their names	15 November (Note: This episode was filmed and broadcast on a Friday, due to a Nations League match being broadcast live on Saturday.)	2.424
3	78	Sandra Kim	Donald Trump	23 November	2.520
4	79	Miss Montreal	Storm names	30 November	2.308
5	80	Veldhuis & Kemper	Wolfs	7 December	2.268
6	81	Spinvis	"Bohemian Rhapsody"	14 December	2.334
7	82	Mathilde Santing	2024	21 December	2.512

=== Season 13 (2025) ===
Episode	Episode (overall)	Musical guest(s)	"Simpel Liedje"	Air date (2025)	Ratings (in millions)
1	83	Glennis Grace	The return of The Voice of Holland	5 April	2.545
2	84	Hans Klok	Binnenhof renovation	12 April	2.357
3	85	Zoë Tauran; The cast of Soldaat van Oranje	Muezzin	19 April	2.252
4	86	Niels Geusebroek	Nicolien van Vroonhoven	26 April	1.968
5	87	George Baker	Arne Slot	3 May	2.229
6	88	Katja Schuurman; Babette van Veen	The new Pope	10 May	2.355
7	89	The Kik; Red Sebastian	2024–25 Eredivisie	18 May (Note: This episode was filmed and broadcast on a Sunday, due to the grand final of the Eurovision Song Contest 2025 being broadcast live on Saturday.)	2.105

=== Season 14 (2025) ===
Episode	Episode (overall)	Musical guest(s)	"Simpel Liedje"	Air date (2025)	Ratings (in millions)
1	90	Acda en de Munnik; Oleg Lysenko; Jos Cové	The Quote 500	1 November	2.953
2	91	Sam Bettens	Nexperia	8 November	2.813
3	92	Jan Smit	6-7	15 November	2.601
4	93	Nance	The new Senate	22 November	2.664
5	94	Joke de Kruijf	2025 UNFCCC	29 November	2.603
6	95	SERA	The power of hooligans	6 December	2.738
7	96	Dio	The goat's perspective	13 December	2.618

=== Season 15 (2026) ===
Episode	Episode (overall)	Musical guest	"Simpel Liedje"/Ukelele (Note: From the 100th episode onwards, hosts Van der Laan & Woe swapped their traditional "Simpel Liedje" for a similar short song, performed with a ukekele.)	Air date (2026)	Ratings (in millions)
1	97	Donnie	To the moon	11 April	1.696 (Note: Starting 1 April 2026, television ratings are published the day after a broadcast, not a week later which was the case before. Thereby, delayed viewers are not included.)
2	98	I.O.S.	2026 Hungarian election	18 April	1.603
3	99	Hannah Mae	Looksmaxxing	25 April	1.611
4	100	Guus Meeuwis	Timmy the humpback whale	2 May	1.386
5	101	Froukje	Eurovision 2026	9 May	1.436
6	102	Daði Freyr	Dick Advocaat	15 May (Note: This episode was filmed and broadcast on a Friday, due to the grand final of the Eurovision Song Contest 2026 being broadcast live on Saturday.)	1.541
7	103	Roxeanne Hazes	NOS Studio Voetbal	23 May	1.222

=== Season 16 (2026) ===
Episode	Episode (overall)	Musical guest(s)	Ukelele	Air date (2026)	Ratings (in millions)
1	104	Floor Jansen; Marnix Emanual	NPO withdraws from Eurovision 2027	31 October	1.395
2	105	Ilse DeLange	Nitrogen cycle	7 November	1.708
3	106	Zanger Rinus	Working from home	14 November (Note: This episode was filmed on 13 November but broadcast the next day, due to host Niels van der Laan being unavailable on 14 November because of the national arrival of Sinterklaas taking place that day, where he plays the role of Hoofdpiet.)	1.827
4	107	Thijs Boontjes	"Erg of mnu?"	21 November	TBA
5	108	TBA		28 November	TBA
6	109	TBA		5 December	TBA
7	110	TBA		12 December	TBA
