= Van der Laan & Woe =

Dutch cabaret duo

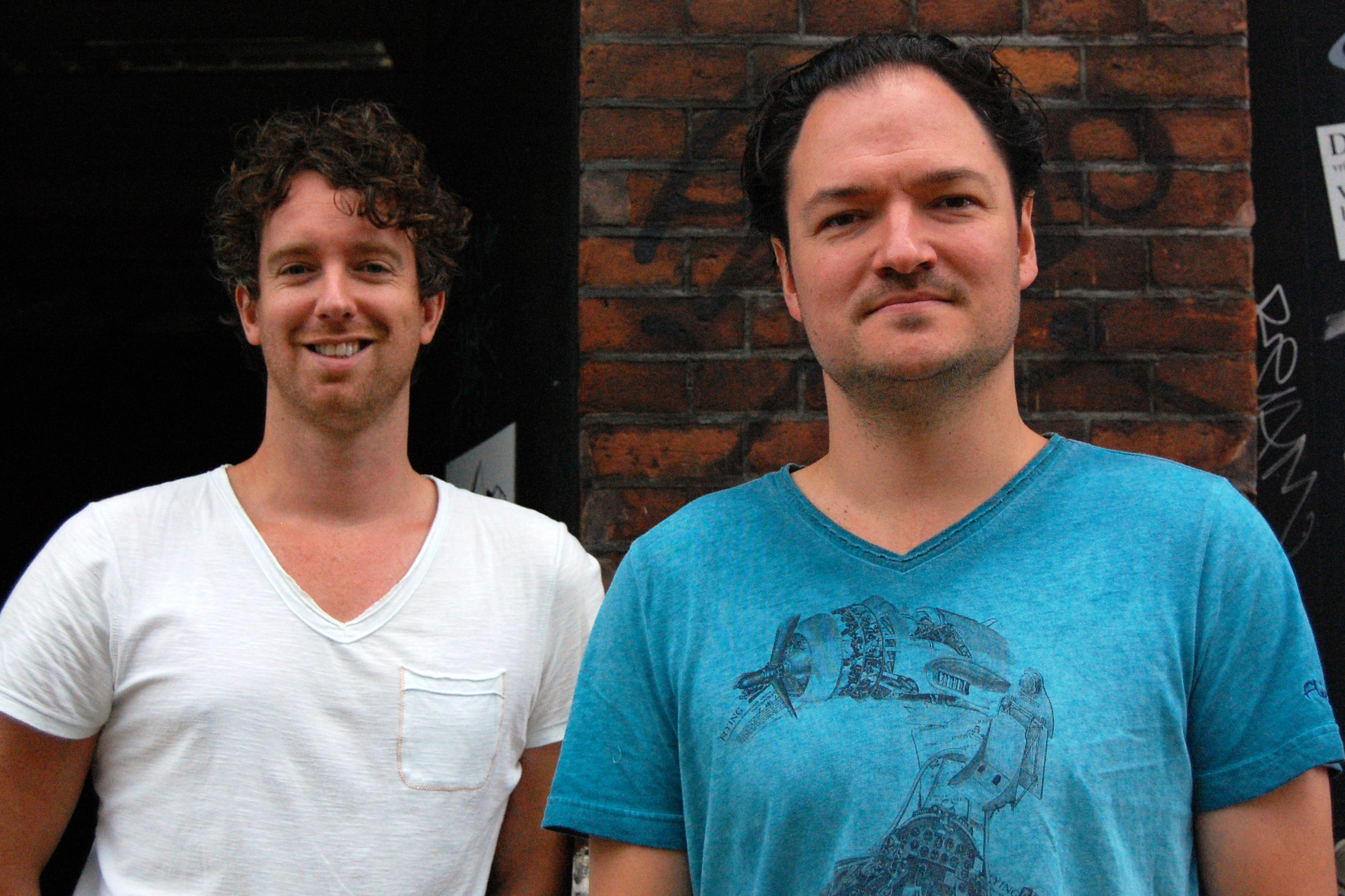
Niels van der Laan (left) and Jeroen Woe (right) in 2016.

Van der Laan & Woe is a Dutch cabaret duo, consisting of Niels van der Laan and Jeroen Woe. They are best known for their collaboration on the satirical program De Kwis and their satirical current affairs program Even tot hier.

== Career ==
Niels van der Laan (1981) and Jeroen Woe (1981) met each other in 2000 at the Academy of Theatre and Dance. In 2004, they both graduated and decided to form a duo together, then under the name Geen Familie (English: No Family). The duo participated in the Amsterdam Cabaret Festival in 2005, where they won the Wim Sonneveld Prize for best cabaret talent.

From 2006 to 2008 the duo played their first theater performance Ctrl+Alt+Del. Their second show, Help ons, was performed by the duo from 2008 to 2010. In 2010, the duo participated in Erik van Muiswinkel's oudejaarsconference, which they also participated in later in 2012. In 2011, they won the Neerlands Hoop prize for their show Superlatief.

=== De Kwis ===
In 2011, the duo was asked by presenter Paul de Leeuw if they wanted to participate in the section De Kwis in his Saturday evening show PAU!L. In De Kwis, a guest of Paul is asked questions about the news of the past week, by means of parodies of songs. Van der Laan & Woe agreed and then, together with Joep van Deudekom and Rob Urgert, became part of De Kwis. When the television program stopped, the section De Kwis was transformed into an independent television program, which started in 2013.

From 2012 to 2014, Van der Laan & Woe toured with their show Buutvrij, which received good reviews and was nominated for the Poelifinario price. From 2014 to 2016, the duo toured with their fifth show Alles eromheen. The duo also collaborated on the animated film Triple Trouble: Animal Sinterklaas, for which they wrote and sang the songs. In 2017, their sixth theatre show Pesetas premiered, which ran until 2020.

In 2018, it was announced that De Kwis would stop after five years. The reason for stopping was that Van Deudekom and Urgert no longer had the motivation to make the programme. In addition, Paul de Leeuw switched from broadcaster BNNVARA to broadcaster RTL, which is why he also stopped with the programme. Unlike Van Deudekom and Urgert, Van der Laan and Woe still had the motivation to continue making television satire. After the program stopped, the duo started making the successor to De Kwis, which would later result in Even tot hier.

=== Even tot hier ===
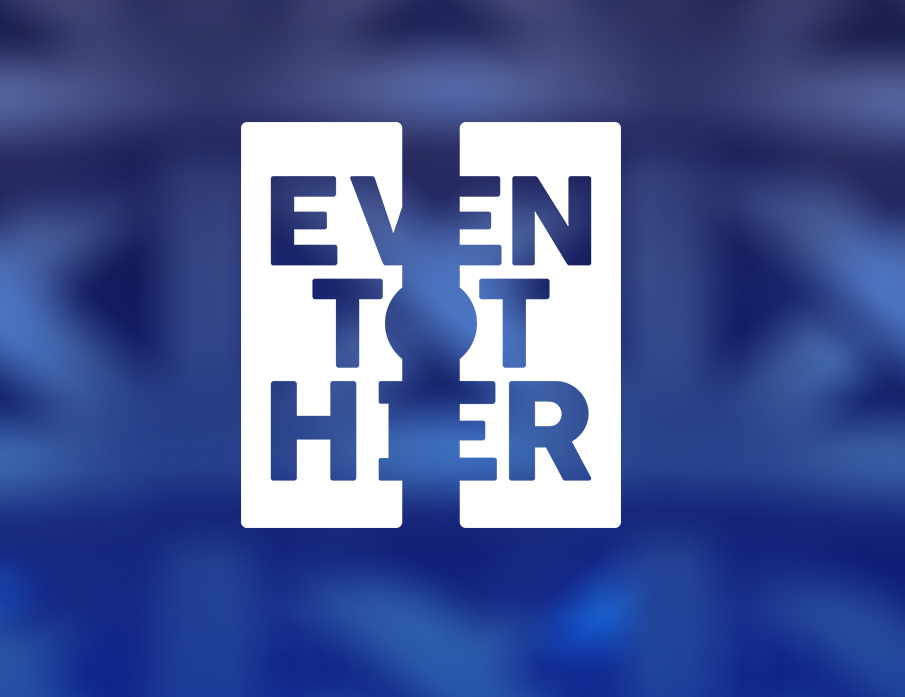
Logo of Even tot hier.

In their new television program Even tot hier, the current events of the past week are dealt with through music and parodies of existing songs that are sung by the original artists. In addition, the program helps people who are victims of a social problem or an incident.

Even tot hier started on March 16, 2019. The program attracted an average of one million viewers per episode. The popularity of Even tot hier grew especially during the COVID-19 pandemic in the Netherlands, when the program made many parodies about the virus. For example, the program did this based on a parody of the song Flappie by comedian Youp van 't Hek, which was transformed into Wappie, a Dutch swear word for a conspiracy theorist.

Even after the corona crisis, the popularity increased and Even tot hier received many positive reviews. For example, the program received a lot of praise in May 2024, because of a parody of the song Europapa by Joost Klein, following his disqualification from the Eurovision Song Contest that year. In 2022, the program won the Gouden Televizier-Ring for best television program and was presented with the Ere Zilveren Nipkowschijf in 2023. In 2025, the duo was named Media Persons of the Year by Broadcast Magazine.

In 2022, their seventh theater performance NG premiered. The performance received man.y positive reviews and was well received. As voice actors, they recorded the Dutch versions of The Smurfs and Puss in Boots: The Last Wish.

In 2026, Van der Laan & Woe will begin touring again with their new theatre show Dinsdagmiddag.

The duo also operates independently. For example, Niels van der Laan has played the role of Hoofdpiet in Het Sinterklaasjournaal since 2018 and Jeroen Woe released his album Woe Weg Was in 2021.

== Style ==
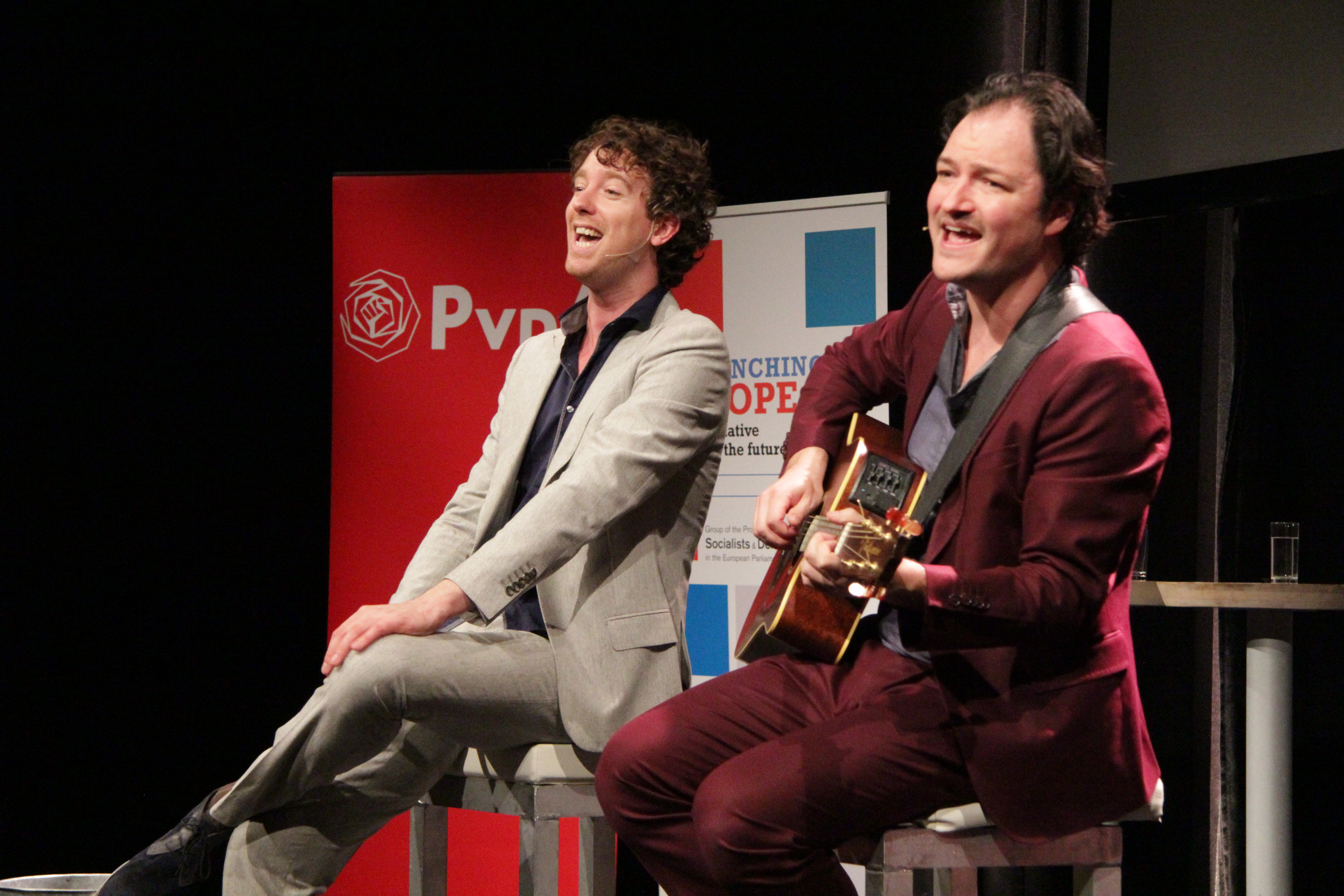
Van der Laan & Woe in 2013.

Van der Laan & Woe create humour through music and song. Their performances often deal with themes, such as the desire for nostalgia, in their performance Pesetas (2017). They also regularly deal with social themes in their performances.

The way in which Van der Laan & Woe create satire in the television programs De Kwis and Even tot hier can be compared to how the duo works in the theater. The difference is that in their television program they use parodies of existing songs. In addition, they regularly make puns and jokes about famous people with an unjustified status.

The style of humour and satire of Van der Laan & Woe are inspired by satirists and comedians, such as the duo Van Kooten en De Bie and Trey Parker and Matt Stone, the creators of South Park.

== Theater performances ==
- 2006-2008: Ctrl+Alt+Del
- 2008-2010: Help ons
- 2010-2011: Een onvergetelijke kerst met Stanley en de Menzo's
- 2010-2012: Superlatief
- 2012-2014: Buutvrij
- 2014–2016, 2018, 2019: Kerst, Kerster, Kerstst met Stanley en de Menzo's
- 2014-2016: Alles eromheen
- 2017-2020: Pesetas
- 2018: Kwisconcert
- 2022-2024: NG
- 2026: Dinsdagmiddag (upcoming)

== Filmography ==
=== Television ===
- Oudejaarsconference: Gedoog Hoop en Liefde (2010)
- PAU!L (2011 – 2012)
- Langs de Leeuw (2012 – 2013)
- Oudejaarsconference: Het Eerlijke Verhaal (2012)
- De Kwis (2013 – 2018)
- Even tot hier (2019 – present)
- De Nationale Non Nieuwsquiz (2019)
- Welkom Thuis (2024)

=== Film ===
- Triple Trouble: Animal Sinterklaas (music and singing)
- The Smurfs (Van der Laan as Brainy Smurf, Woe as Gargamel)
- Puss in Boots: The Last Wish (Van der Laan as the Ethical Bug, Woe as "Big" Jack Horner)

== Radio ==
- Spijkers met Koppen (2004 – 2012)
