= Kawina =

Kawina may refer to:

- Kawina (trilobite), a genus of trilobite in the order Phacopida
- Kawina (music), a musical genre from Suriname
