= List of The Smurfs (2021 TV series) episodes =

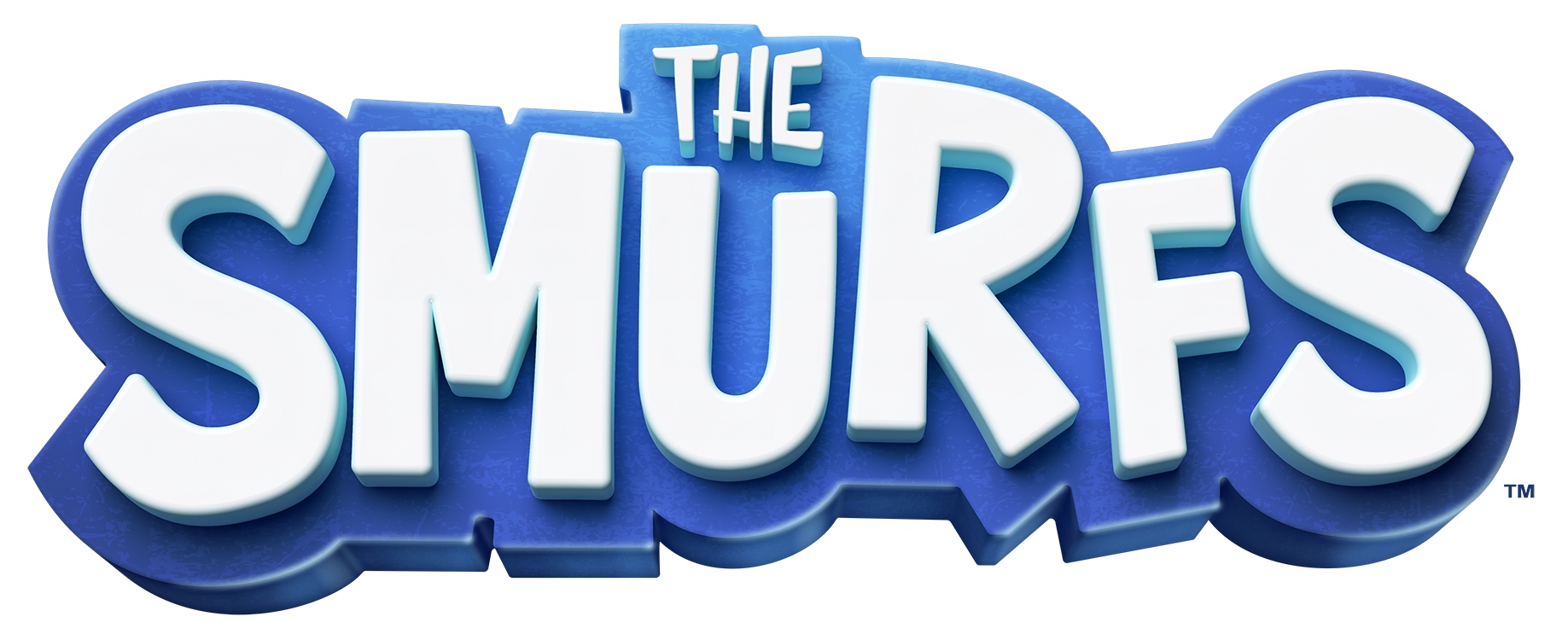

The Smurfs is a Belgian-French-German computer-animated television series developed by Dupuis Edition & Audiovisuel, IMPS, and Peyo Productions, in association with KiKA, Ketnet, RTBF, and Dargaud Media, with the participation of TF1, and is based on the Belgian comic book series of the same name created by Pierre Culliford.

The series originally premiered in Belgium on 18 April 2021 on La Trois (a RTBF channel), during the OUFtivi programming block and on Ketnet (a VRT channel) on 29 October 2021; in France on 9 May 2021 on TF1, within the programming block TFOU; and in Germany on KiKa on 16 April 2022.

The series later premiered in Switzerland, on RTS Un on 25 April 2021, during the RTS Kids programming block; in Québec in Télé-Québec on 28 August 2021, under the title Les Schtroumpfs 3D; in the United States, on Nickelodeon on 10 September 2021; and in many other networks around the world.

Season 2 was announced in February 2022, premiering in the United States on Nickelodeon on 18 July; in Belgium on OUFtivi on 29 August 2022; and in France on TFOU on 5 October 2022.

A third season was announced in October 2023, set to premiere worldwide in summer 2024. The world premiere of season 3 was in Australia on Apple TV+ on 5 August 2024, with the showing of 4 episodes. In Belgium, the third season premiered on RTBF Auvio Kids TV on 25 August 2024. The premiere of season 3 in the United States aired on Nickelodeon on 2 September 2024.

On June 6, 2025 during the 2025 MIFA Annecy, two standalone episodes were confirmed to be in production when Peyo Productions' parent The Peyo Company partnered with Média-Participations' Belgian animation production studio DreamWall (whom handled animated services for the entire show) and French/Canadian production company Blue Spirit; however, Dupuis Edition & Audiovisuel won't be involved in the episodes, the first of which premiered on October 12, 2026.

== Series overview ==
Series	Episodes	Originally released	
Series	Episodes	First released	Last released
1	52	18 April 2021 (Belgium); 6 September 2021 (U.S.)	20 March 2022 (Belgium); 14 July 2022 (U.S.)
2	52	29 August 2022 (Belgium); 18 July 2022 (U.S.)	1 February 2023 (Belgium); 8 December 2023 (U.S.)
3	52	25 August 2024 (Belgium); 2 September 2024 (U.S.)	25 May 2025 (Belgium); 6 December 2025 (U.S.)
Specials	2	TBA (Belgium); 12 October 2026 (U.S.)	TBA (Belgium); TBA (U.S.)

== Episodes ==
=== Season 1 (2021–22) ===
Alexandre Viano supervised the storyboard of each episode.

No. overall	No. in season	Original French title English translated title	Written by	Storyboard by	Original air date (Belgium)	U.S. air date	Prod. code	U.S. viewers (millions)
1	1	"Un nouveau nez pour le Schtroumpf Costaud" "Who Nose?"	Peter Saisselin & Amy Serafin	Bruno Issaly; Alexandre Viano (supervisor)	18 April 2021	18 February 2022 (Note: The episode released online on Apple TV in September 2021 and Nickelodeon UK on November 2, 2021.)	102A	0.47
After a talk with Jokey and Poet, Hefty is convinced that his nose is too big and he wants a new one because he thinks Smurfette is uninterested in him. When he asks Papa Smurf, he refuses, so Hefty uses a spell that enlarges his nose.
2	2	"Robot-Nounou" "Diaper Daddy"	Peter Saisselin & Amy Serafin	Stéphane Annette; Alexandre Viano (supervisor)	18 April 2021	10 September 2021	101B	0.41
Everyone is tired of changing Baby Smurf's diapers, so Handy invents "Diaper Daddy", a robot that changes Baby's diapers for him. When two Smurfs unknowingly spill paint on the robot, causing him to spiral out of control, it runs away with Baby and takes the place on the old tower, so Smurfs have to save Baby from Diaper Daddy.
3	3	"Schtroumpf-Fu" "Smurf-Fu"	Peter Saisselin & Amy Serafin	Jean-Luc Abiven; Alexandre Viano (supervisor)	25 April 2021	10 September 2021	101A	0.41
After Smurfette rescues Brainy from a giant snake, the other Smurfs ask her to teach them “Smurf-Fu.” During the course of the class session, Smurfette kicks out a lot of Smurfs for cheating. When the kicked out Smurfs complain that she didn't even give them a chance, they try to hatch two ways to scare her. In the second attempt, they get captured by Bigmouth, so it's up to her and the other Smurfs to save the day.
4	4	"C'est qui le plus costaud ?" "Who's Heftier?"	Peter Saisselin & Amy Serafin	Lionel Brousse; Alexandre Viano (supervisor)	25 April 2021	12 November 2021 (Note: The episode released online on Apple TV in September.)	104B	0.34
Wimpy Smurf challenges Hefty to a fight. In an accident, Wimpy wins and is treated like a strongman. Smurfette, who knows how Wimpy won, helps Hefty to become the strongest again.
5	5	"Le schtroumpf invisible" "Where's Papa Smurf?"	Peter Saisselin; Amy Serafin	Bruno Issaly; Alexandre Viano (supervisor)	2 May 2021	6 September 2021	104A	0.27
While on a scooter, Brainy causes Papa Smurf to drop his latest experiment and as a result, he becomes invisible. In order to make him visible again, he, Brainy and Smurfette have to get a whisker from Azrael.
6	6	"Attention : chat intelligent !" "Mind the Cat!"	Peter Saisselin & Amy Serafin	Lionel Brousse; Alexandre Viano (supervisor)	2 May 2021	17 September 2021	103B	0.42
Upon teaching Scaredy to conquer his fears of bears, Smurfette and Brainy figure they could use Papa Smurf's hypno-glasses to hypnotize Gargamel to stop catching Smurfs. This backfires and he falls into the mind control of Azrael. Brainy must get back the hypno-glasses and de-hypnotize him.
7	7	"Pas de repos pour le Schtroumpf Paresseux !" "DRIIINNGGGGG!"	Barbara Weber-Boustani	Bruno Issaly; Alexandre Viano (supervisor)	9 May 2021	12 November 2021 (Note: The episode released online on Apple TV in September.)	106B	0.34
Lazy Smurf no longer wants to miss the important moments in the Village, so Handy builds him a special alarm clock to keep him awake, but it keeps the rest of the Smurfs awake as well. When the others want Lazy to turn it off, Lazy refuses and hides in the forest, but he finds himself facing Gargamel.
8	8	"Le Monstro-Schtroumpf" "The Scariest Smurf"	Peter Saisselin & Amy Serafin	Stéphane Annette; Alexandre Viano (supervisor)	9 May 2021	15 October 2021	106A	0.37
It's Halloween, the holiday that Scaredy hates. During the annual party, he blends into a monster suit from Papa Smurf and wreaks havoc in the village. However, the Smurfs don't seem to know that it's Scaredy and keep running away from him.
9	9	"Être ou ne pas être Maladroit" "Clumsy Not Clumsy"	Peter Saisselin & Amy Serafin	Jean-Luc Abiven; Alexandre Viano (supervisor)	16 May 2021	26 May 2022 (Note: The episode released online on YouTube on August 21, 2021, Apple TV in September 2021 and Nickelodeon UK on November 2, 2021.)	102B	0.23
Clumsy is kidnapped by Gargamel again and he reveals a magic amulet that makes him the opposite of what he is. He offers to give it to him in exchange for the location of the village. When Clumsy refuses, Gargamel makes sure to let him "escape". Clumsy takes it without knowing that it contains a tracking device that will lead Gargamel straight to the Smurfs' Village.
10	10	"Le sourire du Schtroumpf Grognon" "Unsmurfable Smile"	Reid Harrison	Stéphane Annette; Alexandre Viano (supervisor)	16 May 2021	17 September 2021	103A	0.42
Smurfette and Blossom notice that Grouchy is never happy. To make up for it, they bring him on a hike with the help of Hefty, Handy, and Papa Smurf. The attempt to do so fails extremely, and they end up trapped on a large mountain. They have to find a way to get back up, while also trying to make Grouchy smile.
11	11	"Les Schtroumpfs volants" "Smurf Your Seat Belts!"	Robert Vargas	Jean-Luc Abiven; Alexandre Viano (supervisor)	18 July 2021	8 October 2021	108A	0.37
While Handy and Storm are bickering, they overhear Gargamel's plan to make Azrael fly, so they create their own flying machines. Meanwhile, Gargamel makes Azrael fly by using the magic amulet (see Clumsy Not Clumsy).
12	12	"La Farce de trop" "Joke's on You; Alexandre Viano (supervisor)"	Peter Saisselin & Amy Serafin	Jean-Luc Abiven; Karim Bousalaa	23 May 2021	24 September 2021	105B	0.25
Vanity is tired of Jokey's exploding box, so he and a couple other Smurfs use magical explosive powder. However, it backfires when the potion creates a bunch of mini-Jokey's, who wreak havoc in the village. They eventually strap Papa onto a rocket and Vanity and Jokey team up to defeat them.
13	13	"Dans la peau d'une Schtroumpf" "Smurfs in Disguise (Note: In the UK, the episode is called "Some Like It Not".)"	Henry Gifford	Alexandre Ulmann; Alexandre Viano (supervisor)	23 May 2021	24 September 2021	105A	0.25
Scaredy and Hefty accidentally break Papa Smurf's telescope while cleaning his lab, so they disguise themselves as girls to avoid punishment. When Smurfette learns about this, she helps them blend in with the others. However, it becomes harder to keep up the act when Papa Smurf tells them about the Iron Smurf Girls Tournament, a competition where Smurfettes compete to hold an egg from breaking.
14	14	"Invasion extraterrestre" "Alien Smurf"	Peter Saisselin & Amy Serafin	Stéphane Annette; Alexandre Viano (supervisor)	24 July 2021	1 October 2021	107B	0.24
An Alien arrives in the village and takes on the form of a Smurf and forces the Smurfs to be his friends. Smurfette must save the day from the alien with the help of Blossom, Storm, and Lily.: This episode first premiered worldwide in France on TF1 on 27 June 2021.
15	15	"Super Schtroumpf" "My Smurf the Hero"	Henry Gifford	Jean-Luc Abiven; Alexandre Viano (supervisor)	25 July 2021	1 October 2021	107A	0.24
Scaredy Smurf is tired of being scared. With the help of the Handy, he becomes a self proclaimed "superhero" around the village (in reality, he causes havoc among the village). But when Bigmouth arrives, Scaredy actually has to face his fear.
16	16	"Qui a schtroumpfé la salsepareille ?" "Leaf It Alone"	Peter Saisselin & Amy Serafin	Jean-Luc Abiven; Alexandre Viano (supervisor)	7 August 2021	8 October 2021	108B	0.37
Gargamel steals the sarsaparilla harvest that the Smurfs use to eat pies. When they find out, they become miserable and substitute it with blueberries. Meanwhile, Jokey, Brainy, and Chef Smurf begin suspecting that Greedy is the culprit until they understand that it was Gargamel's plan to attract them to the sarsaparilla field, which is now filled with traps.
17	17	"Le défilé de la discorde" "The Makeover"	Peter Saisselin & Amy Serafin	Jean-Luc Abiven; Alexandre Ulmann; Alexandre Viano (supervisor)	28 August 2021	29 October 2021	109B	0.45
Vanity convinces Tailor to make a new outfit for the Smurfs. After Begonia gets a hold of it, he and a few other Smurfs greatly change it up, which causes Vanity to accuse Tailor of being a bad voltaire, which causes them to fight in an all-out war. Other Smurfs begin rooting for one or the other and abandon their Fire until a new outfit is made.
18	18	"Le Schtroumpf Bêta devient papa" "Bringing Up Smurfy"	Reid Harrison	Alexandre Ulmann; Alexandre Viano (supervisor)	7 August 2021	29 October 2021	109A	0.45
Dimwitty finds an egg in the forest and becomes a "mother" and names it Dimwitty Junior. When the other Smurfs realize he has no parenting skills, they teach him everything they know about parenting, but Dimwitty learns that the baby will be better with his real parents.
19	19	"Cataschtroumph en cuisine" "Kitchen Klutz"	Peter Saisselin & Amy Serafin	Bruno Issaly; Alexandre Viano (supervisor)	5 September 2021	5 November 2021	111B	0.33
After Clumsy saves Chef from a large rock, he lets Clumsy cook for the Smurfs, but he doesn't do a very good job.
20	20	"L'Arbre à Schtroumpfs" "The Majestic 5"	Peter Saisselin & Amy Serafin	Alexandre Ulmann; Alexandre Viano (supervisor)	29 August 2021	5 November 2021	111A	0.33
Papa Smurf decides to organize an election that will appoint the Smurfs who will be part of the Special Brigade responsible for defending the village. The chosen ones are Dimwitty, Lazy, Scaredy, Clumsy, and Baby. When Gargamel attacks the village and captures all the Smurfs, except the five chosen ones, they have to get along and save their friends.
21	21	"La Recette du Schtroumpf Cuisinier" "Chef Soup"	Reid Harrison	Bruno Issaly; Alexandre Viano (supervisor)	5 September 2021	21 January 2022 (Note: The episode was initially planned to premiere on October 12, 2021. It was later added to Apple TV on January 3, 2022.)	112A	0.42
Chef leaves the village after Brainy criticizes his cuisine. He goes to cook for the ogres, but they aren't satisfied. Meanwhile, the other Smurfs attempt to replace Chef.
22	22	"Des escargots et des Schtroumpfs" "The Round Up"	Peter Saisselin & Amy Serafin	Stéphane Annette; Alexandre Viano (supervisor)	5 September 2021	28 January 2022 (Note: The episode was added to Apple TV on January 3, 2022.)	113A	0.43
Jokey gives Farmer's racing snails a potion to make them super fast. However, the snails continue their race out of the village - without Chef, Storm and Hefty on them, so Jokey has to go look for them in the forest.
23	23	"Un babysitting mouvementé" "Adventures in Smurfsitting"	Robert Vargas	Jean-Luc Abiven; Alexandre Viano (supervisor)	12 September 2021	21 January 2022 (Note: The episode was initially planned to premiere on October 12, 2021. It was later added to Apple TV on January 3, 2022.)	112B	0.42
Clumsy and Dimwitty destroy Chef's lunch for the other Smurfs, making them feel like they're useless. They want the others to feel like they're both helpful in the village, so they are tasked with taking care of Baby. Baby wanders off into the forest and the duo has to save him from various dangers like Bigmouth and Gargamel.
24–25	24–25	"Les Schproumpfs !" "The Pluffs!"	Peter Saisselin & Amy Serafin	Bruno Issaly; Alexandre Viano (supervisor)	28 August 2021; 29 August 2021	14 January 2022 (Note: The episode released online on Apple TV in October 2021 and on Nickelodeon UK in November 2021.)	110	0.43
Brainy and Blossom enter a universe where the Smurfs are mean and Gargamel and Azrael are kind. Note: This is a half-hour special.
26	26	"La guerre des gaufres" "Waffle Wednesday"	Reid Harrison	Alexandre Ulmann; Alexandre Viano (supervisor)	12 September 2021	28 January 2022 (Note: The episode was added to Apple TV on January 3, 2022.)	113B	0.43
Chef Smurf becomes jealous of Lily when she starts making waffles that are better than his. He tries to find ways to figure out what her secret is.
27	27	"L'Assistant du Grand Schtroumpf" "Lab Assistant"	Peter Saisselin & Amy Serafin	Romain Cislo; Alexandre Viano (supervisor)	2 January 2022	4 July 2022	121B	0.16
Papa Smurf takes the Monkey as his assistant due to Brainy's injury, but Brainy and Monkey goes into a war when Monkey turns out to be better assistant.
28	28	"La grande crèche" "Smurfy Day Care"	Guillaume Mautalent; Sébastien Oursel	Stéphane Annette; Alexandre Viano (supervisor)	22 October 2021	4 February 2022	114B	0.26
Baby Smurf accidentally spills a vial in Papa Smurf's magic potion. The whole village after drinking the potion becomes a baby again - except Storm, who finds herself keeping all these babies while trying to find the antidote.
29	29	"Gargamel voit double" "Funny Mommy"	Henry Gifford	Alexandre Ulmann; Alexandre Viano (supervisor)	24 October 2021	4 February 2022	114A	0.26
Jokey transforms Poet into Gargamel's mother, so they'll tell Gargamel to stop chasing Smurfs, but they get stuck in Gargamel's hovel.
30–31	30–31	"Schtroumpfe-moi ton secret" "Smurfy Secrets"	Peter Saisselin & Amy Serafin	Lionel Brousse; Alexandre Viano (Part 1, also supervisor); Jean-Luc Abiven (Part 2)	26 October 2021; 27 October 2021	18 February 2022	115	0.36
When Gargamel tries to transform into a Smurf, Papa Smurf asks Brainy and Storm to collect the Smurfs' secrets to prove their identity in a notebook, but Jokey gets a hold of the pages and they spread around the village. Note: This is the second half-hour special.
32	32	"Scoop chez les Schtroumpfs" "Fake News"	Henry Gifford	Lionel Brousse; Alexandre Viano (supervisor)	7 November 2021	7 July 2022	124B	0.28
Reporter and his employees Jokey and Poet are not selling enough because there is no news in Smurf Village. Jokey tricks Poet to write a fake news about a stone giant threatening he village, causing panic.
33	33	"La fête de Gargamel" "Crashing Gargamel's Party"	Marie Eynard; Emmanuel Leduc	Frédéric Mintoff; Alexandre Viano (supervisor)	7 November 2021	11 February 2022	116A	0.36
Gargamel convinces Dimwitty and Begonia that he has become kind, so they invite him to the village to celebrate a big party in his honor.
34	34	"Bouton d'Or, Guerrière de choc !" "Storm Loses her Mojo!"	Peter Saisselin & Amy Serafin	Stéphane Annette; Alexandre Viano (supervisor)	21 November 2021	29 April 2022	117A	0.28
Blossom unknowingly takes Storm's warrior spirit after using a spell to connect her inner warrior, which makes her so mad that she blocks all ways into the forest. Can Storm and the others stop her warrior madness?
35	35	"Les Schtroumpfboards" "Smurfboards"	Peter Saisselin & Amy Serafin	Romain Cislo; Alexandre Viano (supervisor)	12 December 2021	13 May 2022	120A	0.28
Vanity and Jokey start smurfboarding around the village and Brainy believes they're dangerous trying to teach them the "Highway Code" (safe type of boarding), but he does not get a lot of respection from them.
36	36	"Le Treśor des Schtroumpfs" "The Curse of the Smurfs' Treasure"	Hervé Benedetti & Nicolas Robin	Alexandre Ulmann; Alexandre Viano (supervisor)	28 November 2021	11 February 2022	116B	0.36
Farmer and Vanity find a chest with a magical jewel that brings bad luck to everyone who touches it. Unfortunately, Farmer, Brainy, Jokey and Hefty touch it, so they want to bury it to reverse the spell, but Vanity takes the jewel obsessed with it.
37	37	"Le Pouvoir du Schtroumpf Grognon" "Pop Out!"	Marie Eynard; Emmanuel Leduc	Bruno Issaly; Alexandre Viano (supervisor)	28 November 2021	29 April 2022	117B	0.28
Gargamel casts a spell on Grouchy so that whatever he complains about appears in his hovel. When Jokey finds this out, he starts using him to get rid of some things, but not everything is good to disappear.
38	38	"Gargamel perd la schtroumpf" "Forget Me What?"	Henry Gifford	Bruno Issaly; Alexandre Viano (supervisor)	12 December 2021	6 May 2022	118B	0.39
When Brainy, Dimwitty and Clumsy are chased by Gargamel, Brainy uses the "flower of oblivion" to make evil wizard lose his memory. Then, he befriends Gargamel, but Azrael will try to find ways to return his master's memory.
39	39	"Gargamel à la Une" "Cover Story"	Peter Saisselin & Amy Serafin	Frédéric Mintoff; Alexandre Viano (supervisor)	17 February 2022	6 July 2022	123B	0.22
In search of the scoop of the century for his newspaper, Reporter Smurf attempts to interview Gargamel.
40	40	"La Légende du Schtroumpf Chevalier" "Knight Smurfalot"	Henry Gifford; Peter Saisselin; Based on a story by Henry Gifford	Stéphane Annette; Alexandre Viano (supervisor)	19 December 2021	6 May 2022	118A	0.39
After watching a play about a knight, Dreamer wants to be a knight, so he takes some tools and plays a rescuer around the village - which make some Smurfs angry and they try to stop him.
41	41	"Le baptême de l'air du Schtroumpf Maladroit" "Flying Ace"	Peter Saisselin & Amy Serafin	Alexandre Ulmann; Alexandre Viano (supervisor)	16 January 2022	4 July 2022	121A	0.16
After causing another accident, Clumsy starts believing that the sky is only place where he could not be clumsy, so he asks Handy to teach him how to fly a plane.
42–43	42–43	"Schtroumpfs TV" "The Smurfs Show"	Peter Saisselin & Amy Serafin	Jean-Luc Abiven; Alexandre Viano (supervisor)	5 December 2021	22 April 2022	119	0.36
Baby receives a teddy bear from Gargamel, but that toy has a camera in its eye, which allows Gargamel to spy on them with the help of crystal ball. When the Smurfs find that out, they make up a fake story to trap the evil wizard. Note: This is the third half-hour special.
44	44	"Malin comme un singe" "Monkey See, Monkey Do"	Peter Saisselin & Amy Serafin	Stéphane Annette; Alexandre Viano (supervisor)	30 January 2022	13 May 2022	120B	0.28
The magic supply store has mixed up orders for Gargamel and Papa Smurf. Isteand of trilobite powder, he receives a monkey. When Jokey and Dimwitty have fun with the monkey and are asked to bring it back, they keep it and dress Brainy up as the monkey.
45	45	"Le revers de la médaille" "Order of Merit"	Henry Gifford	Bruno Issaly; Alexandre Viano (supervisor)	18 February 2022	5 July 2022	122A	0.43
Jokey decides to teach Brainy a good lesson because of his actions, inventing an imaginary medal that only rewards the best Smurfs called the "merit medal" - and Brainy would do anything to get it.
46	46	"Miroir, mon beau miroir" "Mirror, Mirror on the Armoire"	Michel Coulon; Jean-Baptiste Merlin	Stéphane Annette; Alexandre Viano (supervisor)	21 February 2022	12 July 2022	125B	0.18
Wanting to impress his Mummy, Gargamel creates and leaves a magic cabinet that imprisons anyone who looks into its mirror in the forest. Unfortunately, Brainy, Blossom, Storm, Hefty, and Farmer are taken inside and Vanity must save them.
47	47	"Le Grand Gargamel" "Smurfing Places"	Fiona Leibgorin	Dave Alvarez; Alexandre Viano (supervisor)	22 February 2022	13 July 2022	126A	0.25
Gargamel exchanges bodies with Papa Smurf and locks Papa into a cage while he goes to the Smurf village. Timid finds out what happens and he's only one who can help Papa escape.
48	48	"La métamorphose du Schtroumpf Coquet" "Leaping Lizards"	Peter Saisselin & Amy Serafin	Alexandre Ulmann; Alexandre Viano (supervisor)	9 January 2022	6 July 2022	123A	0.22
When Vanity notices that he has a pimple on his nose, he breaks into Papa Smurf's lab and steals a lotion to get rid of that pimple, but it turns him into a fire-breathing lizard.
49	49	"Bonne fête maman !" "Smurfy Mother's Day!"	Fiona Leibgorin	Bruno Issaly; Alexandre Viano (supervisor)	9 January 2022	5 July 2022	122B	0.43
While they have been captured by Gargamel, Papa Smurf, Willow and Vanity offer to help Gargamel impress his mother for her birthday.
50	50	"Dans la peau du Grand Schtroumpf" "Papa Times Two"	Peter Saisselin & Amy Serafin	Stéphane Annette; Alexandre Viano (supervisor)	25 February 2022	7 July 2022	124A	0.28
A generic Smurf wants to feel important and respected, so Vanity gives him a makeover that he now looks like Papa Smurf, but he will have to learn what it is to have responsibilities.
51	51	"Tout Schtroumpf, tout flamme !" "You’re Fired!"	Peter Saisselin & Amy Serafin	Bruno Issaly; Alexandre Viano (supervisor)	13 March 2022	11 July 2022	125A	0.35
After another incident, Clumsy and Dimwitty argue and leave the fire brigade. When Smurfette takes their place and does a remarkable job, the two jealous Smurfs unite to pressure her to quit.
52	52	"Le Combat de poésie" "Poet Slam"	Barbara Weber-Boustani	Tomavision; Jean-Luc Abiven; Alexandre Viano (supervisor)	20 March 2022	14 July 2022	126B	0.25
After Poet introduces Lily to the art of poetry and rhyme, they agree to face each other on a poetry contest, but Poet gets the "white rhyme anxiety", which badly affects his poetic knowledge.

=== Season 2 (2022–23) ===
Alexandre Viano supervised the storyboard of each episode.

No. overall	No. in season	Original French title English translated title	Written by	Storyboard by	Original air date (Belgium)	U.S. air date	Prod. code	U.S. viewers (millions)
53	1	"Où est mon Gyroschtroumpf ?" "Where's My Smurfway?"	Peter Saisselin & Amy Serafin	Bruno Issaly; Alexandre Viano (supervisor)	29 August 2022	21 July 2022	202B	0.23
When Blossom misplaces Brainy's beloved smurfway, she has to find it before Brainy finds out.
54	2	"Le Schtroumpf Cambrioleur!" "A Thief Among Us!"	Charles-Henri Moarbes	Frédéric Mintoff; Alexandre Viano (supervisor)	29 August 2022	28 July 2022	204B	0.19
When the Smurfs' favorite things start disappearing all over the village, everyone gets worried and suspicious.
55	3	"Un peu de savoir-schtroumpf !" "Manners Matter"	Peter Saisselin & Amy Serafin	Bruno Issaly; Alexandre Viano (supervisor)	30 August 2022	19 July 2022	201B	0.26
Papa Smurf is nervous about the new Nature Fairy coming to visit so he asks Willow to teach the Smurfs manners.
56	4	"Le Schtroumpf Sauvage s'incruste" "The Guest Who Wouldn't Leave"	Peter Saisselin & Amy Serafin	Frédéric Mintoff; Alexandre Viano (supervisor)	30 August 2022	20 July 2022	202A	0.32
After Wild sprains his ankle, he stays in Papa Smurf's house to recuperate while Papa Smurf is away.
57	5	"Le Schtroumpf tout court" "The Talented Justa Smurf"	Michel Coulon; Jean-Baptiste Merlin	Stéphane Annette; Alexandre Viano (supervisor)	31 August 2022	25 July 2022	203A	0.25
Justa Smurf, surrounded by others who are all Something Smurf, is still searching for his calling. Later, he finds a new talent in mimicking.
58	6	"Pas touche à l'artiste!" "Mommy's Masterpiece"	Lisa Kohn	Bruno Issaly; Alexandre Viano (supervisor)	31 August 2022	27 July 2022	204A	0.29
When the other Smurfs bale out of posing for Painter's masterpiece, he finds a new subject in Gargamel's mom.
59	7	"Chef oui chef !" "Smurf, Yes Smurf!"	Emmanuel Leduc (Based on a story by Etienne Durrenberger, Hans Broker and Marc Chapett)	Bruno Issaly; Alexandre Viano (supervisor)	1 September 2022	26 July 2022	203B	0.17
While Papa Smurf is away, Brainy uses a potion to get the village to obey her every whim.
60	8	"Souriez, vous êtes schtroumpfés!" "Say Smurf for the Camera!"	Suaëna Airault & Sébastien Viaud	Stéphane Annette; Alexandre Viano (supervisor)	1 September 2022	18 July 2022	201A	0.22
Handy invents a camera so Painter can make portraits of all the village's inhabitants.
61–62	9–10	"Un admirateur encombrant" "Ogre Love"	Peter Saisselin & Amy Serafin	Jean-Luc Abiven; Alexandre Viano (supervisor)	2 September 2022	9 September 2022	205	0.20
When Smurfette removes a splinter from Bigmouth's thumb, he immediately falls in love with her and follows her to the village. Note: This is a half-hour special.
63	11	"Le stage d'observaschtroumpf" "Back to Nature"	Hervé Benedetti & Nicolas Robin	Bruno Issaly; Alexandre Viano (supervisor)	5 September 2022	16 September 2022	206A	0.25
Vanity, Poet, and Dimwitty get lost in the forest during a harvest.
64	12	"Gargamel en bave!" "Shell Game"	Peter Saisselin & Amy Serafin	Stéphane Annette; Alexandre Viano (supervisor)	5 September 2022	30 September 2022	208A	0.19
Gargamel changes into a snail so that Farmer leads him to the Smurfs' village.
65	13	"Les deux bêtas font la paire" "Doctor Brainy and mister dumb"	Yves Coulon	Bruno Issaly; Alexandre Viano (supervisor)	6 September 2022	23 September 2022	207B	0.25
Brainy invents the "Smurf scale". However, instead of weighing his smurf, the machine makes Brainy be very stupid.
66	14	"Bouton d'Or se met au vert !" "Blossom Goes Wild!"	Peter Saisselin & Amy Serafin	Jean-Luc Abiven; Alexandre Viano (supervisor)	6 September 2022	30 September 2022	208B	0.19
After a big argument with Storm and Lily, Blossom announces that she is leaving the Girls' Village and is going to live with Wild Smurf.
67	15	"La Schtroumpfette en fait trop!" "Smurfette Overdoes It!"	Yves Coulon & Mathieu Morange	Jean-Luc Abiven; Alexandre Viano (supervisor)	7 September 2022	11 July 2023	210B	0.11
Doing too much, Smurfette is very tired. To teach her the art of doing nothing, Papa Smurf entrusts her to the greatest specialist: Lazy.: The English version of this episode was first shown in the UK on Nickelodeon on 8 January 2023.
68	16	"Okidoki!" "Okey-Dokey!"	Isabelle Destrez; Elisa Loké	Bruno Issaly; Alexandre Viano (supervisor)	7 September 2022	16 September 2022	206B	0.25
Jokey pranks Grouchy by using a potion on him which who asks Grouchy to do something he says "okey dokey!" to everything and does it.
69	17	"Il faut guérir le Schtroumpf Timide!" "Curing Private Timid"	Yves Coulon & Mathieu Morange	Olivier Thulliez; Alexandre Viano (supervisor)	8 September 2022	11 July 2023	210A	0.11
Convinced that Timid admires him, Hefty decides to take him under his wing, in order to teach him self-confidence.: The English version of this episode first shown in the UK and Ireland on Nickelodeon on 8 January 2023.
70	18	"Soufflé n'est pas jouer!" "Souffle Shuffle!"	Charles-Henri Moarbes (Based on a story by Charles-Henri Moarbes & Peter Saisselin)	Olivier Dutranoy; Alexandre Viano (supervisor)	8 September 2022	21 October 2022	209B	0.14
When Chef twists his ankle after an argument with Greedy, he finds himself with no one to help him carry his soufflé to the Spring Festival. Greedy offers but Chef is afraid that he will eat the soufflé before arriving.
71	19	"Duel magique chez les Schtroumpfs" "Smurfy Magic Duel"	Emmanuel Leduc (Based on a story by Etienne Durrenberger, Hans Broker and Marc Chapett)	Jean-Luc Abiven; Alexandre Viano (supervisor)	9 September 2022	23 September 2022	207A	0.25
Papa Smurf and Willow challenge each other to a magic duel.
72	20	"Schtroumpfez-nous de là!" "No Smurf Out!"	Yves Coulon	Olivier Thulliez; Alexandre Viano (supervisor)	9 September 2022	21 October 2022	209A	0.14
Because Scaredy is afraid that a ghost is haunting his house, he asks Handy make it secure. Too well secured, he find himself locked in his house, with Brainy, Blossom, and Chef.
73	21	"L'envol du Grand Schtroumpf" "Papa Smurf Leaves the Nest"	Michel Coulon; Jean-Baptiste Merlin	Bruno Issaly; Alexandre Viano (supervisor)	12 September 2022	12 July 2023	211A	0.15
While Papa Smurf is preparing a potion to cure his voice loss, a sparrow enters his lab and accidentally switches bodies with him.: The English version of this episode was first shown in the UK and Ireland on Nickelodeon on 14 January 2023.
74	22	"Le portrait volé!" "The Stolen Portrait!"	Blanche Philippe	Olivier Dutranoy; Alexandre Viano (supervisor)	12 September 2022	12 July 2023	211B	0.15
Someone has stolen Painter's painting and all the Smurfs are looking for it. While the artist is in despair, Smurfette confuses the culprit for Gargamel.: The English version of this episode was first shown in the UK and Ireland on Nickelodeon on 14 January 2023.
75	23	"Chat perdu" "Lost Cat"	Fiona Leibgorin	Jean-Luc Abiven; Alexandre Viano (supervisor)	13 September 2022	14 October 2022	213B	0.16
Azrael has had enough of Gargamel and leaves the hovel! Only, once in the forest, he gets injured and is picked up by Wild.
76	24	"Le Schtroumpf Gourou" "Baby Sensei"	Peter Saisselin & Amy Serafin	Quentin Lebégue; Alexandre Viano (supervisor)	13 September 2022	13 July 2023	212B	0.14
Smurfette and the students in her Smurf-Fu class mistakenly mistake Baby Smurf for the Smurf-Fu guru who will guide them to the next level.: The English version of this episode was first shown in the UK and Ireland on Nickelodeon on 16 January 2023.
77	25	"La citrouille magique" "The Magic Pumpkin"	Fiona Leibgorin	Bruno Issaly; Alexandre Viano (supervisor)	14 September 2022	14 October 2022	213A	0.16
On Halloween, Smurfette gives Wimpy Smurf a magic pumpkin that makes him terrifying, only the pumpkin isn't actually magic at all.
78	26	"Le Schtroumpf Star" "The Star Smurf"	Emmanuel Leduc (Based on a story by Etienne Durrenberger, Hans Broker and Marc Chapett)	Jean-Christophe Dessiant; Alexandre Viano (supervisor)	14 September 2022	13 July 2023	212A	0.14
Papa Smurf gives Harmony a potion that charms his audience during a concert. However, Harmony forces the dose and the Smurfs turn into hysterical fans.: The English version of this episode was first shown in the UK and Ireland on Nickelodeon on 16 January 2023.
79	27	"Le fantôme du Grand Grand Schtroumpf !" "Brainy Gets Ghosted!"	Charles-Henri Moarbes	Olivier Dutranoy; Alexandre Viano (supervisor)	30 October 2022	17 July 2023	214A	0.13
Brainy becomes annoying to everyone, including Papa Smurf. To get back at him, Painter and Chef prepare a prank, but it backfires.: The English version of this episode was first shown in the UK and Ireland on Nickelodeon on 28 January 2023.
80	28	"Escargots en grève!" "The Snail Whisperer!"	Yves Coulon	Bruno Issaly; Alexandre Viano (supervisor)	8 November 2022	26 July 2023	217A	N/A
Tired of their life, Farmer's snails go on strike and join Wild to share his free and unconstrained life. However, they lost an essential thing when they left the farm, something that only Farmer can give them...: The English version of this episode was first shown in the UK and Ireland on Nickelodeon on 2 May 2023.
81	29	"Ne réveillez pas un sorcier qui dort!" "Never Wake a Sleeping Sorcerer!"	Yves Coulon	Olivier Thulliez; Alexandre Viano (supervisor)	1 November 2022	25 July 2023	216B	N/A
When Gargamel arrives at the Smurfs' village in the middle of the night asleep, Papa Smurf realizes that the wizard is a sleepwalker. The Smurfs take the opportunity to "have fun" with their sworn enemy.: The English version of this episode was first shown in the UK and Ireland on Nickelodeon on 6 February 2023.
82	30	"Le rallye de la citrouille" "Smurf Racers"	Michel Coulon; Jean-Baptiste Merlin	Bruno Issaly; Alexandre Viano (supervisor)	30 October 2022	19 July 2023	215A	0.15
During the first mixed pumpkin rally, Hefty, undisputed champion of previous editions, shows off like a macho, much to the annoyance of Storm, who is determined to show him that a girl can beat him. However, the two have uncompetitive teammates: Blossom and Dimwitty.
83	31	"Le Schtroumpf Tricheur" "Waffles and Punishment"	Yves Coulon & Mathieu Morange	Quentin Lebégue; Alexandre Viano (supervisor)	9 November 2022	24 July 2023	216A	N/A
When Lily puts Greedy in trouble during a contest for the biggest waffle eater, Greedy cheats and wins. Very quickly overwhelmed by remorse, he concocts a potion of oblivion of his own, which brings out two doubles.: The English version of this episode was first shown in the UK and Ireland on Nickelodeon on 6 February 2023.
84–85	32–33	"La machine à schtroumpfer dans le temps" "Smurf to the Future!"	Michel Coulon; Jean-Baptiste Merlin	Jean-Christophe Dessaint; Alexandre Viano (supervisor)	8 January 2023	10 July 2023	219	0.15
After an accident, Blossom and Handy are sent to prehistoric times, where a monkey steals their time cuckoo clock. Note: This is a half-hour special.: This episode first premiered worldwide in Switzerland on RTS Un on 31 December 2022.; The English version of this episode was first shown in the UK and Ireland on Nickelodeon on 1 May 2023.
86	34	"Rock'n Schtroumpf" "Who's in the Band?"	Lisa Kohn	Olivier Thulliez; Alexandre Viano (supervisor)	10 November 2022	20 July 2023	215B	0.10
The Smurf Orchestra is to give a concert for Willow in honor for her birthday. But when Glammy, the singer and leader of the group, behaves like a diva, he is replaced by another diva: Vanity. Glammy is still determined the concert won't happen without him, and nearly ruins Willow's birthday.
87	35	"Gagargamel" "Gargamel Goes Gaga!"	Fiona Leibgorin	Olivier Dutranoy; Alexandre Viano (supervisor)	29 November 2022	18 July 2023	214B	0.17
Because of a love potion infested cake, Gargamel falls in love with Leaf and no longer wants to leave her. The Smurfs come to the rescue of the fairy to rid her of her suitor.: The English version of this episode was first shown in the UK and Ireland on Nickelodeon on 29 January 2023.
88	36	"Schtroumpfe-moi ton doudou !" "The Cuddly Toy"	Peter Saisselin & Amy Serafin	Olivier Dutranoy; Alexandre Viano (also supervisor)	29 November 2022	1 August 2023	220B	N/A
After losing his favorite pillow, Lazy loses his legendary sleep and borrows Baby Smurf's blanket to try it.: The English version of this episode was first shown in the UK and Ireland on Nickelodeon on 10 May 2023.
89	37	"Le Décoince-schtroumpf" "Relaxosmurf"	Lison d'Andrea (Based on a story by Etienne Durrenberger, Hans Broker and Marc Chapett)	Jean-Christophe Dessaint; Alexandre Viano (supervisor)	30 November 2022	1 August 2023	220A	N/A
Fascinated by the talkative Blossom, Timid dreams of becoming her friend. However, he doesn't dare speak to her. Desperate, he begs Papa Smurf for help. With a dose of his "unstuck-Smurf" potion, Timid is transformed into a Confident Smurf! But his new personality doesn't have the desired effect on Blossom.: The English version of this episode was first shown in the UK and Ireland on Nickelodeon on 9 May 2023.
90	38	"Le Pari" "Wanna Bet?"	Fiona Leibgorin	Quentin Lebégue; Alexandre Viano (supervisor)	30 November 2022	8 August 2023	224A	N/A
Provoked by Storm and her legendary competitiveness, Smurfette embarks on a betting escalation.: The English version of this episode was first shown in the UK and Ireland on Nickelodeon on 17 June 2023.
91	39	"Comme un Schtroumpf en pâte !" "Wild Gets Tamed!"	Yves Coulon & Mathieu Morange	Matthieu Pitschon; Alexandre Viano (supervisor)	1 December 2022	2 August 2023	221A	N/A
When Wild steals their cupcakes, Begonia, Lily, and Blossom decide to teach him a lesson.: The English version of this episode was first shown in the UK and Ireland on Nickelodeon on 11 May 2023.
92	40	"On ne schtroumpfe pas avec l'amour !" "Dreamer: Master of Love"	Lisa Kohn	Olivier Thulliez; Alexandre Viano (supervisor)	22 January 2023	3 August 2023	222B	N/A
Persuaded to be an expert in love, Dreamer uses all the great clichés of romance novels to unite two Smurfs whose couple is more than unlikely -- Papa Smurf and Willow.: The English version of this episode was first shown in the UK and Ireland on Nickelodeon on 10 June 2023.
93	41	"La salsepapareille" "The Sarsaparillo Run"	Lison d'Andréa	Bruno Issaly; Alexandre Viano (supervisor)	1 February 2023	7 August 2023	223B	0.22
Papa Smurf, Willow, Leaf, and Gargamel and his mother are looking for the Salsapaparilla plant that grows every 100 years.: This episode first premiered worldwide in Switzerland on RTS Un on 7 January 2023.; The English version of this episode was first shown in the UK and Ireland on Nickelodeon on 11 June 2023.
94	42	"Le Schtroumpf Maladroit fait son cirque" "I'm Off to the Circus!"	Peter Saisselin & Amy Serafin	Jean-Luc Abiven; Alexandre Viano (supervisor)	2 December 2022	3 August 2023	222A	N/A
When Clumsy convinces himself that he must become an acrobat at all costs to better manage his clumsiness, the Smurfs create a fake circus company to make his dream come true.: The English version of this episode was first shown in the UK and Ireland on Nickelodeon on 10 June 2023.
95	43	"Faut qu'ça pousse!" "The Yummyus Pie"	Charles-Henri Moarbes	Jean-Luc Abiven; Alexandre Viano (supervisor)	9 January 2023	2 August 2023	221B	N/A
Chef is growing increasingly worried when he sees that the Succulents, the main ingredient in his famous Equinox pie, haven't bloomed yet and asks Farmer to do something.: This episode first premiered worldwide in Switzerland on RTS Un on 1 January 2023.; The English version of this episode was first shown in the UK and Ireland on Nickelodeon on 12 May 2023.
96	44	"Une salsepareille sans pareille" "Smurfs Might Fly"	Suaëna Airault & Sébastien Viaud	Jean-Luc Abiven; Alexandre Viano (supervisor)	28 November 2022	27 July 2023	217B	N/A
On the occasion of the Sarsaparilla festival, Chef, Brainy, Dimwitty, and Greedy are in the forest, without seeing that Gargamel bewitched the sarsaparilla fields.: This episode first premiered worldwide in Switzerland on RTS Un on 20 November 2022.; The English version of this episode was first shown in the UK and Ireland on Nickelodeon on 3 May 2023.
97	45	"Pompier un jour, pompier toujours" "Smurfs on Fire"	Yves Coulon	Bruno Issaly; Alexandre Viano (supervisor)	7 December 2022	7 August 2023	223A	0.22
The Smurfs can no longer take the nonsense and clumsiness of Clumsy and Dimwitty of the fire brigade. They then organize a competition to recruit a new brigade, however, Clumsy and Dimwitty do not want to be ousted, so they decide to participate in the tests in incognito mode.: The English version of this episode was first shown in the UK and Ireland on Nickelodeon on 11 June 2023.
98	46	"Farce attaque!" "Happy Smurfs Fools Day!"	Charles-Henri Moarbes	Jean-Christophe Dessaint; Alexandre Viano (supervisor)	8 December 2022	31 July 2023	218A	N/A
It's Pranks Day and Jokey is excited! But when he realizes that the Smurfs play pranks on each other and ignore his own, which they consider outdated, Jokey, annoyed, leaves the village. However, Gargamel finds his trapped gifts very useful... to capture the Smurfs!: This episode first premiered worldwide in Switzerland on RTS Un on 4 December 2022.; The English version of this episode was first shown in the UK and Ireland on Nickelodeon on 4 May 2023.
99	47	"Le Schtroumpf à molette" "The Wrench Smurf"	Michel Coulon & Jean-Baptiste Merlin	Bruno Issaly; Alexandre Viano (supervisor)	28 November 2022	31 July 2023	218B	N/A
When Handy turns Diaper Daddy into a perfect assistant, an incident burns the machine's memory.: This episode first premiered worldwide in Switzerland on RTS Un on 27 November 2022.; The English version of this episode was first shown in the UK and Ireland on Nickelodeon on 5 May 2023.
100	48	"Il faut schtroumpfer feuille!" "Leaf's Under the Weather!"	Lison d'Andrea	Olivier Dutranoy; Alexandre Viano (supervisor)	11 January 2023	9 August 2023	225A	0.22
This morning, the Smurfs' village wakes up in panic: the weather is completely out of whack! Cold, hot, cold... And for good reason: Leaf is sick! To stop these disorders that threaten the forest and its inhabitants, the Smurfs must cure the fairy.: This episode first premiered worldwide in Switzerland on RTS Un on 1 January 2023.; The English version of this episode was first shown in the UK and Ireland on Nickelodeon on 18 June 2023.
101	49	"Un ami de taille" "An Unsmurfy Friendship"	Lison d'Andrea	Matthieu Pitschon; Alexandre Viano (supervisor)	12 January 2023	10 August 2023	226B	0.15
While the Smurfball Tournament is in full swing, Grouchy resists the general enthusiasm. Annoyed by his bad mood, the Smurfs relegate him to the bench. Annoyed, Grouchy goes into the forest, where he comes across Bigmouth. The two become friends, much to the disappointment of Egghead.: This episode first premiered worldwide in Switzerland on RTS Un on 1 January 2023.; The English version of this episode was first shown in the UK and Ireland on Nickelodeon on 24 June 2023.
102	50	"Un Noël schtroumpfant" "A Smurfy Christmas"	Yves Coulon	Bruno Issaly; Alexandre Viano (supervisor)	25 December 2022	8 December 2023	226A	0.10
As Christmas approaches, Jokey mixes up the letters that the Smurfs have asked him to send to Santa Claus.: This episode premiered worldwide in France on TF1 on 14 December 2022.
103	51	"Âllo, Docteur Schtroumpf ?" "House Call"	Peter Saisselin & Amy Serafin	Serge Tanguy; Alexandre Viano (supervisor)	24 January 2023	9 August 2023	225B	0.22
The Smurfs find a note from Gargamel who asks his mother to come and treat him because he is very sick. They then feel compelled to help the wizard and decide to go to his house with Doctor Smurf. Only problem: the latter has never taken care of human beings!: The English version of this episode was first shown in the UK and Ireland on Nickelodeon on 18 June 2023.
104	52	"Gargamel, reine du bal" "Gargamel, Queen of the Prom"	Lison d'Andréa	Jean-Luc Abiven; Alexandre Viano (supervisor)	24 January 2023	8 August 2023	224B	N/A
This year, the Smurf Girls have invited all the Smurfs to their big Equinox ball. Hearing the news, Gargamel and Azrael transform into Girl Smurfs and infiltrate the preparations. The wizard's objective: pour an evil filter into the Sarsaparilla cocktail!: The English version of this episode was first shown in the UK and Ireland on Nickelodeon on 17 June 2023.

=== Season 3 (2024–25) ===
Alexandre Viano supervised the storyboard of each episode.

No. overall	No. in season	Original French title English translated title	Written by	Storyboard by	Original air date (Belgium)	U.S. air date	Prod. code	U.S. viewers (millions)
105	1	"Tonton Gargamel" "Family Time"	Peter Saisselin & Amy Serafin	Jean-Luc Abiven; Alexandre Viano (supervisor)	25 August 2024	3 September 2024	301A	N/A
Gargamel confiscates Dwayne and Rowena's toys. Seeking revenge, they free Brainy and Lily, whom their uncle had captured.: This episode first premiered worldwide in Australia on Apple TV+ on August 5, 2024.
106	2	"Le Gigaschtroumpf" "Smurf VS Machine"	Peter Saisselin & Amy Serafin	Alexandre Viano (also supervisor)	25 August 2024	4 September 2024	301B	N/A
Jealous of Diaper Daddy, Handy crafts himself a dysfunctional, overpowered exoskeleton. But when it malfunctions and he finds himself in danger, Diaper Daddy is the only one who can save him.: This episode first premiered worldwide in Australia on Apple TV+ on August 5, 2024.
107	3	"Opération Gargamel" "See Gargamel Run"	Sean Carson & Dave Tomlinson	Bruno Issaly; Alexandre Viano (supervisor)	1 September 2024	5 September 2024	302A	N/A
Emboldened by her own talents, Storm enlists Lily and Blossom to help her chase Gargamel out of the forest forever...but unknowingly leads them into a trap!: This episode first premiered worldwide in Australia on Apple TV+ on August 5, 2024.; The French version of this episode was first shown in Switzerland on RTS Un on 25 August 2024.
108	4	"Le bébé costaud" "Hefty Baby"	Simon Lecocq	Matthieu Pitschon; Alexandre Viano (supervisor)	1 September 2024	9 September 2024	302B	N/A
Hefty is challenged by Storm, but accidentally switches bodies with Baby Smurf with no one the wiser.: This episode first premiered worldwide in Australia on Apple TV+ on August 5, 2024.
109	5	"Dragon de compagnie" "Dragon Pet"	Franz Kirchner	Bruno Issaly; Alexandre Viano (supervisor)	8 September 2024	10 September 2024	303A	N/A
Rowena casts a spell on Lily's dragon friend Voltaire that forces him to obey her orders.: This episode first premiered worldwide in Australia on Apple TV+ on August 5, 2024.; The French version of this episode was first shown in Switzerland on RTS Un on 1 September 2024.
110	6	"La farce ultime" "The Ultimate Prank"	Franz Kirchner	Mickaël Mérigot; Alexandre Viano (supervisor)	8 September 2024	11 September 2024	303B	N/A
When one of Jokey's pranks goes wrong, the Smurfs are all turned into pebbles.... or so it appears.: This episode first premiered worldwide in Australia on Apple TV+ on August 5, 2024.; The French version of this episode was first shown in Switzerland on RTS Un on 1 September 2024.
111	7	"La Plante de Rowena" "Rowena's Plant"	Simon Lecocq	Jean-Luc Abiven; Alexandre Viano (supervisor)	3 September 2024	12 September 2024	304A	N/A
Clumsy and Dimwitty want to help Rowena cure her plant, unaware that it's all a scam to capture Smurfs.: This episode first premiered worldwide in Australia on Apple TV+ on August 5, 2024.
112	8	"Une si jolie poupée" "What a Doll"	Peter Saisselin & Amy Serafin	Mickaël Mérigot; Alexandre Viano (supervisor)	3 September 2024	16 September 2024	304B	N/A
Rowena turns Vanity and Storm into dolls.: This episode first premiered worldwide in Australia on Apple TV+ on August 5, 2024.
113–114	9–10	"Les Grands jeux schtroumpfs" "The Great Smurfs Games"	Céline Ronté & Antoine Schoumsky	Jean-Luc Abiven (part 1); Bruno Issaly (part 2); Alexandre Viano (supervisor)	3 September 2024	2 September 2024	305	N/A
Clumsy is desperate to win the Great Smurf Games and win the prize, but Gargamel, and eventually Dwayne and Rowena, have their eyes on it as well.: This episode premiered worldwide in France on TF1 on 1 September 2024.
115	11	"Dans le ventre du dragon" "I Want a Dragon"	Peter Saisselin & Amy Serafin	Bruno Issaly; Alexandre Viano (supervisor)	3 September 2024	17 September 2024	306A	N/A
Tired of not being able to defend himself, Wimpy tries to curry favor with Voltaire, but is accidentally eaten by him .
116	12	"Une recette explosive" "Magic Meltdown"	Sean Carson & David Tomlinson	Jean-Luc Abiven; Alexandre Viano (supervisor)	3 September 2024	18 September 2024	306B	N/A
Chef uses an abandoned cauldron from Papa Smurf's lab and accidentally brings it to life, and it seeks revenge on the village leader for throwing it out.
117	13	"Un Trio d'enfer" "His Own Worst Enemy"	Sean Carson & David Tomlinson	Matthieu Pitschon; Alexandre Viano (supervisor)	3 September 2024	19 September 2024	307A	N/A
Brainy accidentally gives Gargamel the idea to clone himself to catch Smurfs, but Gargamel finds out the hard way that sometimes less is better.
118	14	"L'Arbre de la connaissance" "Tree of Knowledge"	Lee Walters	Mickaël Mérigot; Alexandre Viano (supervisor)	3 September 2024	23 September 2024	307B	N/A
The Smurfs think they have found the famous Tree of Knowledge mentioned in a legend and all rush to ask it for advice. They do not know that it is actually Dimwitty, stuck inside a hollow trunk.
119	15	"Une étoile pour le Grand Schtroumpf" "Reaching For Stars; Reaching for the Stars"	Peter Saisselin & Amy Serafin	Matthieu Pitschon & Olivier Dutranoy; Alexandre Viano (supervisor)	3 September 2024	24 September 2024	308A	N/A
After breaking Papa Smurf's telescope, Monkey wants to repair his mistake and goes in search of a star with Wild's help.
120	16	"L'Équipe de choc" "The Dream Team; Dream Team"	Franz Kirchner	Bruno Issaly; Alexandre Viano (supervisor)	3 September 2024	25 September 2024	308B	N/A
Dwayne finds Handy's jet pack in the forest and takes it to make his own. Handy assembles an unlikely team to get it back from Gargamel's hovel.
121	17	"La Nuit du monstre" "Monster in the Village"	Franz Kirchner	Mickaël Mérigot Alexandre Viano (supervisor)	10 November 2024	26 April 2025	310A	N/A
Lily and Farmer must save the village despite their differences after a mysterious monster turns the Smurfs into crawling zombies.: This episode premiered worldwide in France on TF1 on 27 October 2024.
122	18	"La grande Excursion" "The Tour"	Peter Saisselin & Amy Serafin	Bruno Issaly Alexandre Viano (supervisor)	10 November 2024	19 April 2025	309A	N/A
Blossom brings Scaredy on a trip to the forest to conquer his fear.
123	19	"La Poupée de Mémé" "Granny's Doll"	Simon Lecocq	Olivier Dutranoy Alexandre Viano (supervisor)	17 November 2024	26 April 2025	310B	N/A
Gargamel transforms Rowena into a Smurfette in an attempt to capture Smurfs, but Mummy begins adoring her because she reminded her of her doll from her childhood.
124	20	"Le Chef d'Oeuvre de Bébé Schtroumpf" "Smurfing a Masterpiece"	Simon Lecocq	Jean-Christophe Dessaint Alexandre Viano (supervisor)	17 November 2024	19 April 2025	309B	N/A
Painter uses Baby to make abstract paintings, but things soon get out of hand.
125	21	"La Guerre des Nounous" "The Battle of the Sitters"	Antonin Poirée	Jean-Christophe Dessaint; Alexandre Viano (supervisor)	19 November 2024	3 May 2025	311A	N/A
Smurfette and Grouchy argue over who takes better care of Baby... a competition then begins between the two babysitters.
126	22	"L'ours qui parle aux Schtroumpfs" "What the Bear Said"	Lee Walters	Jean-Christophe Dessaint; Alexandre Viano (supervisor)	21 November 2024	10 May 2025	312A	N/A
Handy creates a machine to translate animal sounds but Clumsy breaks it and doesn't dare say it. He then hides in the machine and speak for him so that Handy doesn't realize it.
127	23	"En route pour la planète Mars" "Let's Smurf to Mars"	Jeremy Elsair & Peter Saisselin	Jean-Luc Abiven; Alexandre Viano (supervisor)	22 November 2024	3 May 2025	311B	N/A
Blossom dreams of going to Mars. She decides to do it in secret with the help of Handy because Papa Smurf has forbidden them from going there.
128	24	"Les Schtroumpfs et le Portail Magique" "Parallel Worlds"	Simon Lecocq	Jean-Christophe Dessaint; Alexandre Viano (supervisor)	22 November 2024	10 May 2025	312B	N/A
Following a blunder by Dimwitty and Clumsy, they find themselves wandering in parallel universes, trying to return to their own.
129	25	"La Dent de Rowena" "Wobbly Tooth"	Lee Walters	Mickaël Mérigot; Alexandre Viano (supervisor)	11 December 2024	17 May 2025	313A	N/A
To prove to Storm that they can also have great adventures, Bubble and Firefly decide to steal one of Rowena's teeth, which is about to fall out.
130	26	"Les Schtroumpfs escargots" "Slithering Smurfs"	Peter Saisselin & Amy Serafin	Bruno Issaly; Alexandre Viano (supervisor)	11 December 2024	6 December 2025	314B	N/A
Jokey wants to prove that he is capable of taking care of Baby. While Bubble is there to help him, they accidentally turn Baby into a snail.
131	27	"La grande Obscurité" "The Darkest Night"	Mikaël Fenneteaux	Olivier Dutranoy; Alexandre Viano (supervisor)	12 December 2024	17 May 2025	313B	N/A
Gargamel causes a long dark night to fall on the forest in order to capture the Smurfs and only Firefly can come to their aid.
132	28	"Le treizième Dessert" "The Thirteenth Dessert"	Antonin Poirée	Bruno Issaly; Alexandre Viano (supervisor)	20 December 2024	6 December 2025	314A	N/A
To respect a Smurfy tradition, Chef and Blossom must find a thirteenth dessert for the Christmas meal, which will take them straight to Gargamel.: This episode premiered worldwide in France on TF1 on 8 December 2024.
133	29	"Le plus beau caillou du monde" "The Prettiest Pebble in the World"	Catherine Diran & Stéphane Allégret	Mickaël Mérigot; Alexandre Viano (supervisor)	19 January 2025	9 July 2025	315B	N/A
Without realizing that it is a trap of Gargamel, Lily finds a sudden passion for pebbles that she finds in the forest and begins a collection which quickly becomes imitated among the Smurfs.
134	30	"Le Voleur de Gaufres" "Waffle Thief"	Peter Saisselin & Amy Serafin	Olivier Dutranoy; Alexandre Viano (supervisor)	19 January 2025	14 July 2025	316B	N/A
Dwayne loves Lily's waffles but she refuses to make him any more. He then decides to take revenge by transforming her into a waffle.
135	31	"Une pâtée pour Azraël" "Smurfalicious Cat Food"	Peter Saisselin & Amy Serafin	Jean-Luc Abiven; Alexandre Viano (supervisor)	26 January 2025	10 July 2025	316A	N/A
To make Azrael docile, Chef prepares an irresistible pie that Gargamel will serve. Unfortunately, Mummy goes crazy and demands that Gargamel make it again.: This episode first premiered worldwide in Switzerland on RTS Un on 20 January 2025.
136	32	"Des pompiers sans camion" "Fire Brigade on Foot"	Peter Saisselin & Amy Serafin	Jean-Christophe Dessaint; Alexandre Viano (supervisor)	26 January 2025	8 July 2025	315A	N/A
Clumsy and Dimwitty are arguing about who should drive the truck. Unable to agree, they park the truck in the forest but lose it.: This episode first premiered worldwide in Switzerland on RTS Un on 20 January 2025.
137	33	"Météorite et le Tambour magique" "Drummer Girl"	Peter Saisselin & Amy Serafin	Kevin Audi Grivetta; Alexandre Viano (supervisor)	1 February 2025	21 July 2025	318B	N/A
Meteorite's drum, cursed by Gargamel, bewitches the girls and leads them to Gargamel.
138	34	"Le Toutou de Gargamel" "Gargamel's Doggy"	Yves Coulon	Bruno Issaly; Alexandre Viano (supervisor)	1 February 2025	17 July 2025	318A	N/A
In order to prove to his uncle that he can be a good Smurf hunter, Dwayne makes a potion that gives him the qualities of a hunting dog, but also his faults....
139	35	"Le nouveau Jouet de Broc" "Dwayne's New Toy"	Antonin Poirée	Olivier Dutranoy; Alexandre Viano (supervisor)	9 February 2025	16 July 2025	317B	N/A
Diaper Daddy feels neglected among the Smurfs and decides to go in search of a place where he will be better loved.: This episode first premiered worldwide in Switzerland on RTS Un on 3 February 2025.
140	36	"La Folie du Discoschtroumpf" "Disco Smurf"	Catherine Diran & Stéphane Allégret	Jean-Christophe Dessaint; Alexandre Viano (supervisor)	12 February 2025	15 July 2025	317A	N/A
Meteorite and Vanity finds a disco mushroom in the forest that they bring back to the village to dance with the Smurfs, unaware that it is another trap from Gargamel.: This episode first premiered worldwide in Switzerland on RTS Un on 3 February 2025.
141	37	"Bébé Schtroumpf devient grand" "Big Baby"	Lee Walters	Bruno Issaly; Alexandre Viano (supervisor)	16 March 2025	22 July 2025	320A	N/A
While trying to help Farmer grow his plants faster, Papa Smurf accidentally gives the potion to Baby, who starts growing nonstop.
142	38	"Silence chez les Schtroumpfs" "Don't Smurf a Sound"	Peter Saisselin; Amy Serafin	Kevin Audi Grivetta; Alexandre Viano (supervisor)	16 March 2025	23 July 2025	320B	N/A
Gargamel gives Azrael supersonic hearing so that he can help Gargamel to locate the Smurf village.
143–144	39–40	"On va schtroumpfer sur la lune" "We Smurfed on the Moon"	Yves Coulon	Mickaël Mérigot (part 1); Bruno Issaly (part 2); Alexandre Viano (supervisor)	23 March 2025	7 July 2025	319	N/A
When the moon goes out, the Smurfs decide to fly there to relight it, without knowing that it is Leaf who unintentionally caused the catastrophe.
145	41	"La Métamorphose du Grand Schtroumpf" "Spider Smurf"	Yves Coulon	Jean-Christophe Dessaint; Alexandre Viano (supervisor)	2 April 2025	28 July 2025	321B	N/A
To prove that he is still in an Olympic form, Papa Smurf wants to create a potion that should give him back his youth. But that was not to mention that a spider accidentally intrudes into the recipe.
146	42	"Un Voleur en Cuisine" "Smurf T for Thief"	Yves Coulon	Jean-Luc Abiven; Alexandre Viano (supervisor)	2 April 2025	30 July 2025	322B	N/A
Someone stole the traditional Blueberry cake from the Fête du Bleu! Chef then wants to innovate with a new recipe, but an investigation to find the thief is necessary!
147	43	"Schtroumpfement groumpf" "Smurfily Grumrfy"	Alain Vallejo	Olivier Dutranoy; Alexandre Viano (supervisor)	7 April 2025	29 July 2025	322A	N/A
Baby finds the Cuckoo Clock which allows time travel, and accidentally brings the Gmurfs back to the village, who take him under their wing.: This episode first premiered worldwide in Switzerland on RTS Un on 4 April 2025.
148	44	"Le nouvel ami du Schtroumpf Paysan" "Farmer's New Pet"	Peter Saisselin; Amy Serafin	Jean-Christophe Dessaint; Alexandre Viano (supervisor)	8 April 2025	24 July 2025	321A	N/A
Attacked by insects, Farmer's crops are in dire straits. When he sees Gulp eating insects, he decides to plant one of his seeds, accidentally creating a Gulp invasion in the village.: This episode first premiered worldwide in Switzerland on RTS Un on 3 April 2025.
149	45	"Histoire à schtroumpfer de peur" "Scary Stories"	Peter Saisselin; Amy Serafin	Jean-Christophe Dessaint; Alexandre Viano (supervisor)	4 May 2025	13 September 2025	324A	N/A
While Storm claims to be afraid of nothing, Jokey challenges her to go to a cave in the middle of the night, to tell her scary stories.
150	46	"L'Ombre du Schtroumpf Costaud" "The Smurf Who Lost His Shadow"	Yves Coulon	Mickaël Mérigot; Alexandre Viano (supervisor)	4 May 2025	13 September 2025	324B	N/A
Following an incident, Hefty's shadow comes to life and rebels because he wants to be free to do what he wants. But once without his shadow, Hefty loses his strength and begins to disappear.
151–152	47–48	"Le talisman magique" "Storm and the Lost Talisman"	Lee Walters	Bruno Issaly; Alexandre Viano (supervisor)	11 May 2025	6 September 2025	323	N/A
Storm hears Gargamel talking about a talisman that will give him the power to seize the girls' village. She then decides to seize it first to save her village!
153	49	"Lucrétia prend le pouvoir" "Lucretia Seizes Power"	Antonin Poirée	Jean-Christophe Dessaint; Alexandre Viano (supervisor)	18 May 2025	20 September 2025	325A	N/A
To monitor the captured Papa Smurf and Storm, Gargamel brings to life Lucretia, Rowena's doll, to make her a prison guard who becomes a little too bossy.
154	50	"Le Grand Schtroumpf perd la tête" "Papa Lost His Mind"	Yves Coulon	Jean-Christophe Dessaint; Alexandre Viano (supervisor)	18 May 2025	20 September 2025	325B	N/A
Following yet another bowl of Clumsy, a flower pot falls on Papa Smurf, who loses his mind. While Brainy decides to take charge of the village, the others Smurfs do everything to bring Papa Smurf to his senses.
155	51	"Le Cadeau du Grand Schtroumpf" "Papa's Birthday Gift"	Peter Saisselin; Amy Serafin	Kevin Audi Grivetta; Alexandre Viano (supervisor)	25 May 2025	27 September 2025	326B	N/A
Dimwitty and Begonia offer a birthday present to Papa Smurf, but the latter does not like him and then pretends to have lost him. Dimwitty and Begonia find him and then make sure that he never loses him again.
156	52	"Mon Amie l'Abeille" "Bee My Friend"	Lee Walters	Jean-Luc Abiven; Alexandre Viano (also supervisor)	25 May 2025	27 September 2025	326A	N/A
Lost in the forest, a bee chooses Blossom as the new queen and follows her everywhere. But the latter, fearing bees, decides to conduct an investigation with Lily to find the hive.

=== Specials (2026–) ===
No.	Original French title English translated title	Written by	Storyboard by	Original air date (Belgium)	U.S. air date	Prod. code	U.S. viewers (millions)
1	"The Great Magic Showdown"	F.M. De Marco	TBA	TBA	12 October 2026	001	TBD
Papa Smurf is honored to be invited by the great wizard-alchemist Homnibus to take part, with other witches and wizards, in the creation of the philosopher's stone. As he joins this prestigious council, a strange participant knocks on the door of Homnibus' castle: the magician Radicchio, who has many similarities with Gargamel. Suspicious, Papa Smurf leads an inquiry into who this stranger really is...
2	"An Unexpected Arrival"	TBA	TBA	TBA	TBA	002	TBD
One morning, the Smurfies, along with a couple Smurfs, set off on a journey to go and fetch a parcel brought during the night by a stork. This parcel, once arriving at their destination, ends up being rather surprising: it is a baby Smurfie, crawling around in a diaper. Little baby Smurfie is turning the ttrip back home into a real, chalenging adventure, in addition to the perilous, unexpected dangers her mischief, bad ideas and tough luck will bring along the way.
