= Trafassi =

Surinamese-Dutch band

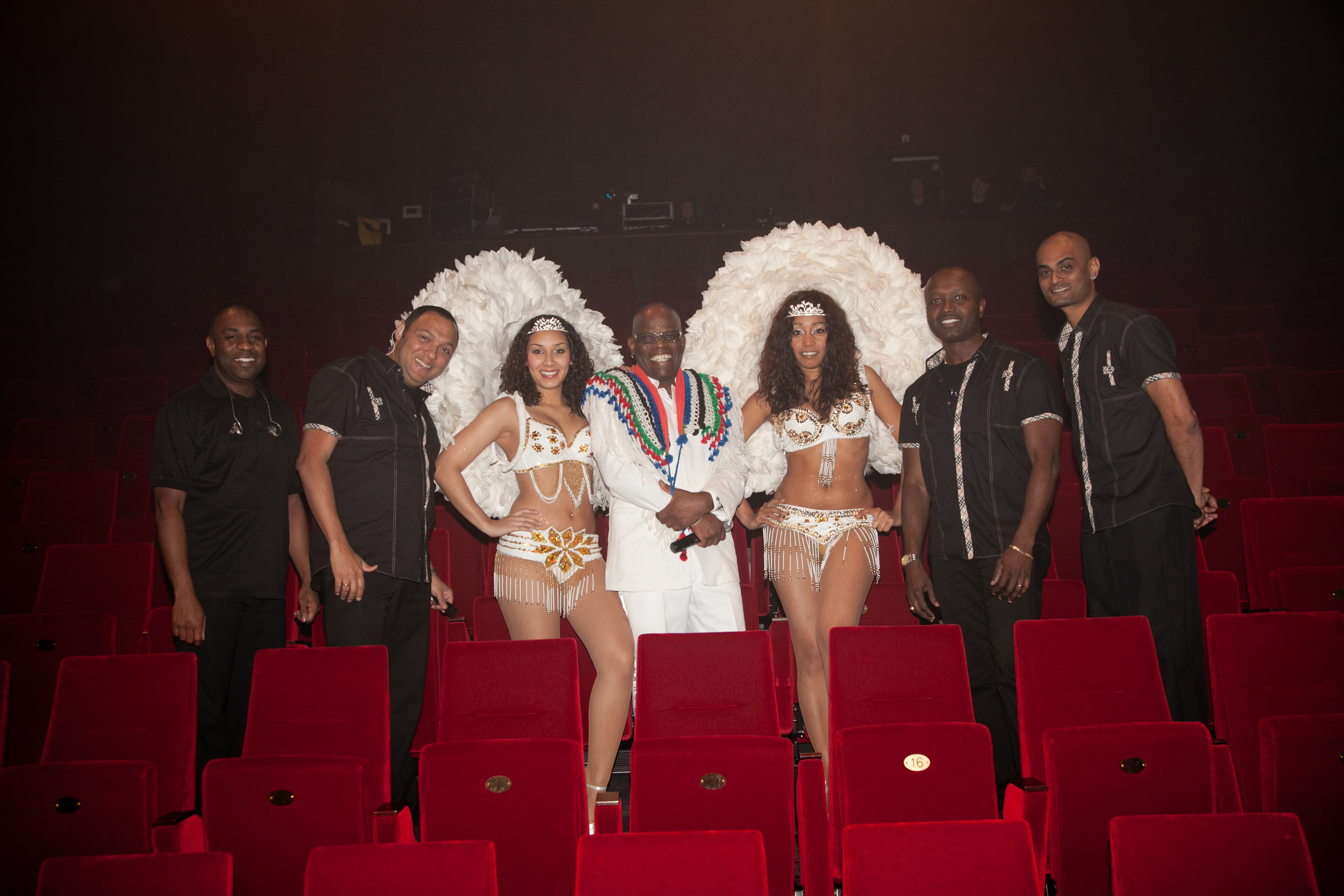
- Trafassi in 2012

Background information
- Origin: Paramaribo, Suriname
- Genres: Pop, merengue, kaseko, salsa
- Years active: 1981–present
- Labels: Mercury, Tra Records, Dureco
- Members: Edgar Burgos; Harold Biervliet; Lesley Leeflang; Ricardo Tjon Akon; Iwan Vaudelle

Trafassi is a Surinamese-Dutch band. Their music is a mixture of Caribbean music genres, pop and own material. In the Netherlands they scored hits like Wasmasjien, Lollypop and Punani.

== History ==
Trafassi (Sranan Tongo for "a different way") was founded in 1981 by former members of The Happy Boys, the former backing-band of Lieve Hugo. The band started out as a kaseko-formation, but gradually developed into an all-around band with songs in Sranan Tongo, Dutch and English. They made cover versions of the soul ballad The Train by Ray Charles and Je t'aime... moi non plus, with the latter having equally suggestive lyrics under the title Me Jam.

In 1985, the band scored a hit with Wasmasjien, reaching number ten in the Dutch Top 40. This song was extensively promoted and received an unofficial music video by a Walt Disney cartoon-show. The song is based on the in 1982 Papiamento song "Wasmashin", written and composed by Macario 'Makai' Prudencia from Curaçao, in the by him developed music style "Salsa Antiano". The singles that followed were rejected by the record company because they did not sound like Wasmasjien.

In the late 1990s, lead singer and percussionist Edgar Burgos and the other Trafassi members parted ways. Burgos founded a "new" Trafassi, with which he still performs.

== Discography ==
Albums

- Asema (1984)
- Wasmasjien (1985)
- Volume 6 (1986)
- Bacchanal Lady (1989)
- Punani / Banana Light (1991)
- PumPum Sexy Body (1992)
- Funchi (Poppy Houdt Van Lolly) (1996)
