= Lieve Hugo =

- Also known as: The King of Kaseko, Iko
- Born: Julius Theodoor Hugo Uiterloo; December 13, 1934; Paramaribo, Suriname
- Origin: Suriname
- Died: November 15, 1975 (aged 40) Amsterdam, Netherlands
- Genre: Kaseko
- Occupation: Singer
- Instrument: Vocals
- Years active: 1963–1975

Julius Theodoor Hugo Uiterloo (December 13, 1934 – November 15, 1975), better known by his stage-name Lieve Hugo and his nickname Iko, was a Surinamese singer. He was one of the pioneers of the kaseko-genre; hence his other nickname King of Kaseko.

== Biography ==
=== Washboard Orchestra ===
Lieve Hugo sang in a choir and played drums and percussion in a variety of bands with or without other retired boxers. In 1967, he joined Washboard Orchestra; in this band, who more or less invented kaseko, he was both a drummer and a singer. A mutated version headlined the 1970 Holland Festival at the Amsterdam Concertgebouw and got the crowd on their dancing feet. Health-reasons forced him to leave Washboard Orchestra; he moved to the Bijlmermeer-area of Amsterdam and retired his drumkit after being diagnosed with a poor heart condition.

=== Solo albums ===
Lieve Hugo signed to EMI and released his debut solo-album in 1974. Lieve Hugo: King of Kaseko became one of the biggest-selling albums in Surinamese music. Lieve Hugo and his backing-band The Happy Boys toured extensively through the Netherlands, Belgium and South America. His sophomore album, 1975's Wan Pipel (One people, one nation) chronicled Suriname's impending independency. Lieve Hugo would never experience this milestone.

=== Death ===
During a performance at Club Sosa in Amsterdam, Lieve Hugo suffered a heart-attack; he died on November 15, 1975, ten days before the Independence Day-ceremony for which he was scheduled to play. His body was flown back to Suriname and buried at Mariusrust on November 23.

=== Tributes ===
==== Happy Boys ====
The Happy Boys continued as a band with several lead vocalists, including Lieve Hugo's cousin Edgar Burgos. They released two albums in 1977 and 1978; debut album Akoeba included the tribute-song Memoria Foe Iko (on the melody of Historia de amor). After the break-up in 1980, Burgos and four other Happy Boys formed the original line-up of Trafassi; they took Lieve Hugo's unfulfilled ambitions to further heights and became one of the leading live-acts in the Netherlands.

==== Revival and tribute-concerts ====
In 2008, the Netherlands appeared to be ready for a Lieve Hugo-revival. The Metropole Orchestra paid tribute to the King of Kaseko at the Concertgebouw backing up artists such as De Dijk, Oscar Harris, Re-Play, Boris Titulaer, Berget Lewis, Izaline Calister, Angela Groothuizen and Edgar Burgos.

In 2013 both solo-albums were reissued on one cd as part of TopNotch's Sranan Gowtu-series (Surinamese Gold) devoted to Surinamese artists, mainly from the 1970s.

Singer John Oldenstam did a Lieve Hugo-tribute-tour and incorporated some of these songs in his regular shows.
