= Ewald Krolis =

Surinamese kaseko-singer and percussionist (1947–2006)

- Born: Ewald Harold Krolis; 16 May 1947; Paramaribo, Suriname
- Died: 22 September 2006 (aged 59) Rotterdam, Netherlands
- Genres: Kaseko
- Occupations: Singer, percussionist

Ewald Harold Krolis (16 May 1947 – 22 September 2006) was a Surinamese kaseko-singer and percussionist.

== Biography ==
Krolis started singing at a young age; he formed The Rhythm Makers with Bertje Tjin A Kwie, André Stekkel and producer-to-be Stan Lokhin. Their repertoire of kaseko, calypso, soul, merengue and reggae earned Krolis a residency at the local Torarica Hotel's Saramacca-bar.

In November 1975, he moved to the Netherlands after Surinam became an independent state. Krolis settled in Rotterdam where he formed Caribbean Combo; the other members were his brother Robby, John Kembel, Ricardo Tjon A Kon, Lesley Leeflang, and August Cabenda. They were often joined by Ramon Laparra who went on to lead his own band Master Blaster. Caribbean Combo signed to Unice Records, an independent niche-label, and released their first two singles (Merie Mie and Mie Ne Meri Deng; packed in near-identical sleeve-designs) in 1977. A debut-album followed in 1979; Switie Bamaro consisted of ten new recordings including cover-versions of The Blues Busters' Wide Awake In A Dream (translated in Surinamese) and Eddy Grant's Say I Love You.

Throughout the first half of the 1980s, Krolis released 12-inch singles such as 1984's Mie Lobi which came out on Mirza Records; its B-side Mi Kanto Ma Mi De Ete (Fallen But Not Defeated) became Krolis' signature song. Pop radio-station 3FM took notice by 1985 and invited Caribbean Combo for a live-concert.

On April 17, 1986, Krolis got involved in a car crash that left him disabled and practically deaf; he secluded but managed to record one more album; Biegie Famier' Mang, produced by Lesley Leeflang and released in 1995 to positive reviews. Plans for a follow-up album never materialised; Krolis died on 22 September 2006, in a hospital in Rotterdam.

Several members went on to celebrate his music by forming the Ewald Krolis Tribute Band; brother Robby took centre-stage as one of the lead vocalists.
