= Kaseko =

Musical genre from Suriname

- Stylistic origins: Kawina; jazz; dixieland; calypso; rock and roll; bigi poku
- Cultural origins: Late 1940s, Paramaribo, Suriname
- Typical instruments: Skratji; snare drum; drums; saxophone; trumpet; trombone; electric guitar; bass guitar; vocals

Fusion genres
- Kaskawi; Kaskazouk

Regional scenes
- Suriname; Netherlands

Other topics
- Music of Suriname

Kaseko is a musical genre from Suriname. It is a fusion of numerous popular and folk styles derived from Africa, Europe and the Americas.

The genre is rhythmically complex, with percussion instruments including skratji (a very large bass drum) and snare drums, as well as saxophone, trumpet and occasionally trombone. Singing can be both solo and choir. Songs are typically call-and-response, as are Creole folk styles from the area, such as kawina.

== Etymology ==
The term Kaseko may be derived from Kasékò, a Guianan creole dance.

== History ==
Kaseko emerged from the traditional Afro-Surinamese kawina music, which was played since the beginning of 1900 by street musicians in Paramaribo. It evolved in the 1930s during festivities that used large bands, especially brass bands, and was called Bigi Poku ("big drum music"). In the late 1940s, jazz, calypso, and other importations became popular, while rock and roll soon left its own influence in the form of electrified instruments.

Eddy Snijders incorporated kaseko to symphonic music.

In the 1970s, Surinamese diaspora living in the Netherlands, such as Lieve Hugo and Ewald Krolis, popularised kaseko.
