= Triple Trouble: Animal Sinterklaas =

2014 Dutch animated film

- Theatrical release poster
- Dutch: Trippel Trappel: Dierensinterklaas
- Directed by: Albert 't Hooft; Paco Vink
- Screenplay by: Albert 't Hooft; Paco Vink
- Produced by: Arnoud Rijken; Michiel Snijders
- Music by: Vidjay Beerepoot
- Production companies: Il Luster Productions; Luna Blue Film; Vivi Film; Katholieke Radio Omroep
- Distributed by: A-Film Benelux (Netherlands); Kinepolis Film Distribution (Belgium)
- Release dates: 8 October 2014 (Netherlands); 22 October 2014 (Belgium)
- Running time: 67 minutes
- Countries: Netherlands; Belgium
- Language: Dutch
- Budget: €1.7 million
- Box office: $353,000 (Belgium)

Triple Trouble: Animal Sinterklaas (Dutch: Trippel Trappel: Dierensinterklaas) is a 2014 Dutch-Belgian traditionally animated adventure film written and directed by Albert 't Hooft and Paco Vink in their feature film directorial debuts.

== Premise ==
As animals do not believe in Sinterklaas, Freddy, Cari and Mosus go on a journey to find Sinterklaas and give him their Christmas list in person.

== Voice cast ==
- Hans Somers as Freddy the ferret
- Georgina Verbaan as Cari the canary
- Reinder van der Naalt as Mosus the stick insect
- Bartho Braat as Bello
- Kasper van Kooten as Rat

== Production ==
Albert 't Hooft and Paco Vink founded their own studio Anikey Studios, in 2007 at The Hague. Commissioned animators from Il Luster Productions approached them in 2008 to direct and write the film with Arnoud Rijken and Michiel Snijders acted as producers. In order to improve their storytelling skills and build a team of animators, 't Hooft and Vink created with il Luster Productions two 10-minute short films and the 25-minute Paul and the Dragon (Dutch: Paultje en de Draak). With a budget of €1.7 million for Triple Trouble: Animal Sinterklaas, 't Hooft stated "I don’t want to be too proud of that since it isn’t realistic. The last six months we ['t Hooft and Vink] practically worked for free because there was more to be done than we anticipated."

== Release ==
Triple Trouble: Animal Sinterklaas was released in Dutch cinemas on 8 October 2014 by A-Film Distribution. It was released in Belgium on 22 October by Kinepolis Film Distribution, simultaneously in Dutch and French. In Belgium, it grossed $352,618 from 485 screens.
