= Peter de Koning =

Dutch singer

Peter de Koning (born 13 October 1960, Vlaardingen) is a Dutch singer. In 1995, he had a big hit with the single, Het is altijd lente in de ogen van de tandarts-assistente (It is always Spring in the eyes of the dentist's assistant). It was written as part of his final exam at Rotterdam Conservatory. It reached No. 5 on the Dutch Singles Chart. He followed that up with the album De avonturen van Peter de Koning

In 2009 he returned as lead vocal and bassist for the Dutch band De Flamingo's.

== Discography ==
=== Albums ===
- 1996: De avonturen van Peter de Koning

=== Singles ===
Year	Single	Chart peak (NED)	Certification
1995	"Het is altijd lente in de ogen van de tandarts-assistente"	6	
1996	"Hartstikke Gek"	–	
