= Zanger Rinus =

Dutch musician

Zanger Rinus Cathrinus Dijkstra
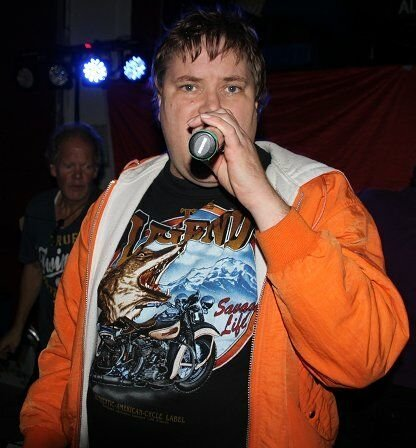

Background information
- Also known as: Zanger Rinus
- Born: 19 October 1969 (age 56); Drachten, Netherlands
- Genres: Dutch music
- Years active: 2009–present

Cathrinus "Rinus" Dijkstra (born 19 October 1969), professionally known as Zanger Rinus (Dutch for "Singer Rinus"), is a Dutch musician.

== Biography ==
In 2009 Rinus released the song "Hey Marlous", an adaptation of "Schöne Maid, hast Du heut' für mich Zeit" by the German singer Tony Marshall from 1972. "Hey Marlous" is about Dutch singer Marlous Oosting. He became well known among the general public because the television program De Wereld Draait Door paid attention to it in one of their broadcast in the section De tv draait door.

After this followed more songs, such as "Hé Kastelein" (2010) and "Met Romana op de Scooter". The latter song was put on YouTube on 8 July 2011 and was viewed more than 300,000 times within five days. The song also attracted international attention: on the American news blog The Huffington Post an article was dedicated to the video.

Debora Siepman, his life partner since 1998, can often be seen in his video clips. Both also make an appearance in the song "Make You Pop" by Diplo & Don Diablo. Rinus and Siepman were later engaged to marry. Siepman died unexpectedly on 7 June 2024, aged 51.

Rinus has an intellectual disability. In his daily life, he is a woodworker in a social workshop.

== Discography ==
=== Singles ===
Single	Year	Peak chart positions (Dutch Single Top 100)	Comments
"Hey Marlous"	2009	7	
"Met Romana Op De Scooter"	2011	98	
"Eet veel bananen"	2013	30	With Ronnie Ruysdael & Debora
