= Kawina (music) =

Music genre from Suriname

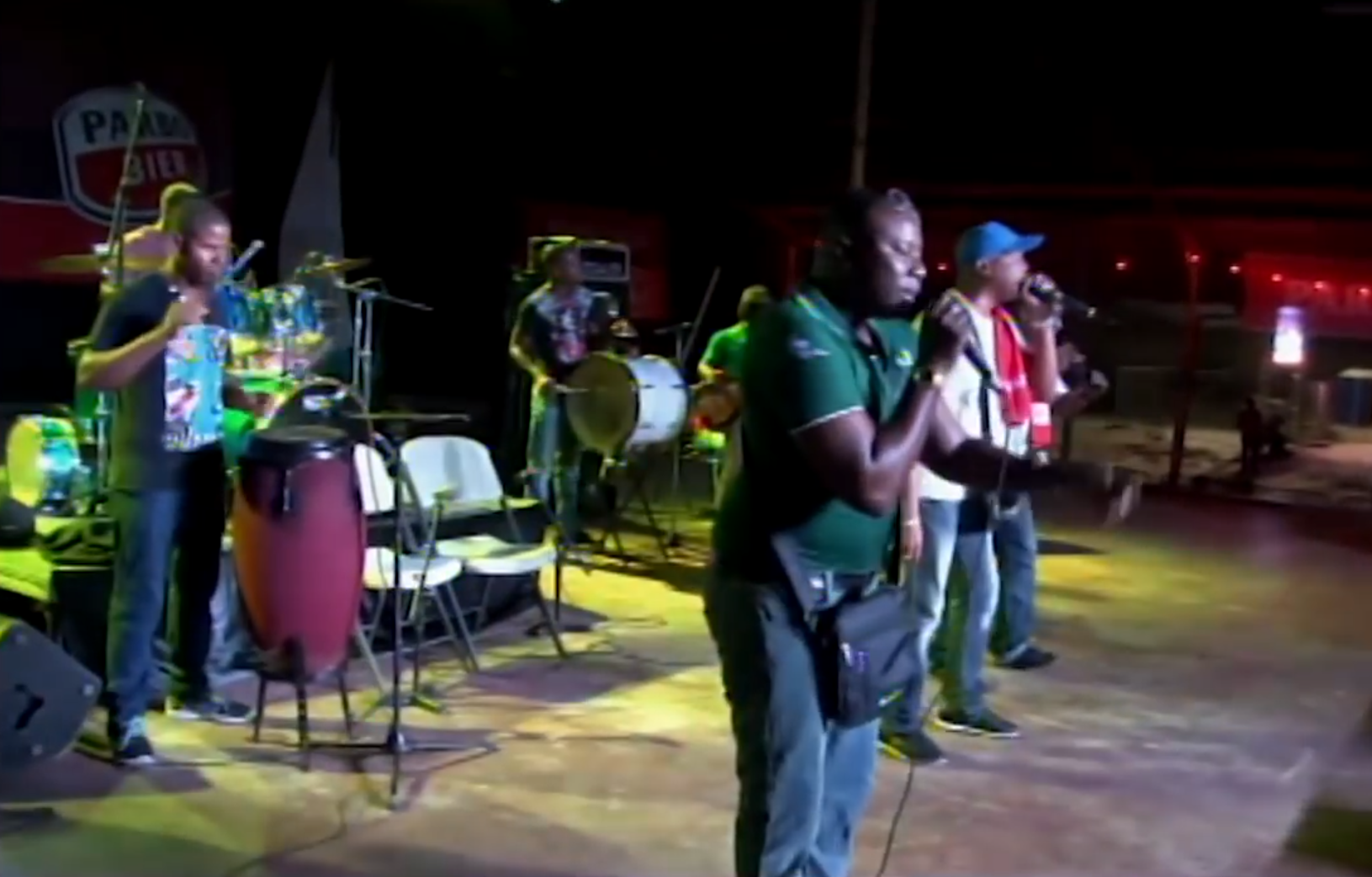
- Kawina Festival at owru yari, 2016
- Etymology: Commewijne
- Other names: kawna, kauna
- Stylistic origins: banya, laku and tuka
- Cultural origins: Afro-Surinamese
- Typical instruments: Drums, kwakwa-bangi, zigzag, call and response (singing)
- Derivative forms: Prisir kawina, winti kawina

Subgenres
- Bigi poku, kaskawi

Regional scenes
- Suriname, Netherlands

Other topics
- Music of Suriname

Kawina, also spelled kawna or kauna, is a musical genre from Suriname. It originated in the last decades of the 19th century under the influence of the music and dance forms banya, laku and tuka. It is related to African music.

== Development ==
=== Origin ===
The genre shares its name with the river Commewijne and the district with the same name: both are called kauna in Sranan Tongo. There are several theories about the origin of this name. According to one theory, kawina was created on the Upper Commewijne by Maroons influenced by indigenous Surinamese. According to a second, it was called mabu poku, and later renamed after a talented singer in the Commewijne District. According to a third theory, kawina originated among gold miners and rubber tappers in the rainforest.

=== Dominance and decline ===
Until the beginning of the 20th century, kawina was the dominant Afro-Surinamese music style. Around that time, it was overtaken in popularity by kaseko. This shift was mainly from the influence of Fransje Gomes, as she introduced a fuller sound with wind instruments and electric guitars.

=== Comeback ===
Big Jones was one of the artists that kept kawina alive in the 1960s. Together with Johan Zebeda, he recorded the first kawina record in history. Zebeda was helped by radio station owner and producer Werner Duttenhofer; unlike other radio stations, Duttenhofer's station made sure to give Zebeda's music airplay. Another 1960s musician who focused on kawina and banya was Pa Monti. He played with Overtoom Kriyoro for forty years; in 1981, he founded his own group, Monti Kriyoro, and developed a style of his own. René Waal of the theater troupe De Vrolijke Jeugd also wrote songs in the genres of kaseko, winti and kawina. Waal stayed with the troupe in Suriname from 1940 to 1973, and then traveled with them to the Netherlands.

=== Stage music ===
In the 1980s, Patrick Tevreden began introducing kawina to stage performances. As a child, he would rehearse with his friends by hitting sticks on buckets; Johan Zebeda was one of his heroes. In 1987, Tevreden toured with NAKS under Zebeda through French Guiana, southern France and the Netherlands. Upon his return to Suriname, Tevreden founded Sukru Sani with Marcel Morman. With help from Guno Ravenberg of Radio KBC, they were successful almost immediately. The group released 132 songs in total. At the peak of their popularity, they gave more than twenty performances per month. The band existed until 1993, but kawina music has remained popular on stage since then.

Soon afterwards, the singer Sisa Agi emerged on the kawina scene with her group Ai Sa Si. They had hits like Ba Pinda, Faluma and Teke Doi.

With the departure of Surinamese musicians to the Netherlands, kawina and the related style kaskawi were introduced there as well. Significant bands in the Dutch scene have been OG Explosion, La Rouge, La Caz and Spiet Faja.

== Characteristics ==
Kawina is usually played for dance and entertainment, similar to West African dance music in general. Kawina shows several similarities with African music: claves that are drummed on a kwakwa-bangi drum, an abundance of musical imagery, and lyrics about relationships between men and women. The music is in four-quarter time, with an emphasized fourth beat on a conga or timbau.

In kawina, the four-string cuatro has become less popular, while the kwakwa-bangi and pudya have become fixed elements. Sometimes a conga, an iron bell, or iron shake instruments are also added. In Paramaribo, a skratji is used as well. Different drums have always been a part of the style, except for the apinti drum which is often used in rituals. Similar to other styles that have come forth from African music, kawina incorporates call and response singing: a cantor starts a dialogue and the choir responds with the same sentence or an answer. Kawina dances are performed in an anti-clockwise circle.

== Sub-styles ==
Traditionally, there are two sub-styles of kawina:

- Prisir kawina (prisir means pleasant):
  Prisir kawina is meant for entertainment or relaxation; it does not have a religious character. The instruments are usually two kawina drums, a sakka and a cuatro (or reson). Over the course of time, diverse styles of prisir kawina have emerged all over Suriname. New songs are often created to tell about notable events. The older dance and music forms of banya, tuka and laku were sung in the rhythm of kawina.
- Winti kawina (winti is an Afro-Surinamese religion):
  Winti kawina has religious significance as a way to communicate with different wintis. For this purpose, several variations should be made on a solo drum. The music was traditionally performed in 12/8 time but was later transformed to 4/4 time.

== Influence on other styles ==
The rhythm of bigi poku has been attributed to kawina.

Kawina and kaseko formed the basis of kaskawi music. Some performances of kaskawi can be considered pure kawina, where drums have been exchanged for a drum kit.

Jeangu Macrooy combined kawina with soul music in his song "Birth of a New Age", which was the Netherlands' submission for the Eurovision Song Contest of 2021.

Shakira has incorporated the Kawina rhythm into her song Hips Don't Lie

== Sources ==
- Samwel, Diederik (2015) Sranan gowtu - Iconen uit de Surinaamse muziek, ISBN 978-9038801254 (in Dutch)
- Weltak, Marcel (1990), Surinaamse muziek in Nederland en Suriname, ISBN 9021593009 (in Dutch)
  - English translation by Scott Rollins expected August 2021, ISBN 9781496834881
