= The Smurfs (2021 TV series) =

Animated series based on the comics by Peyo

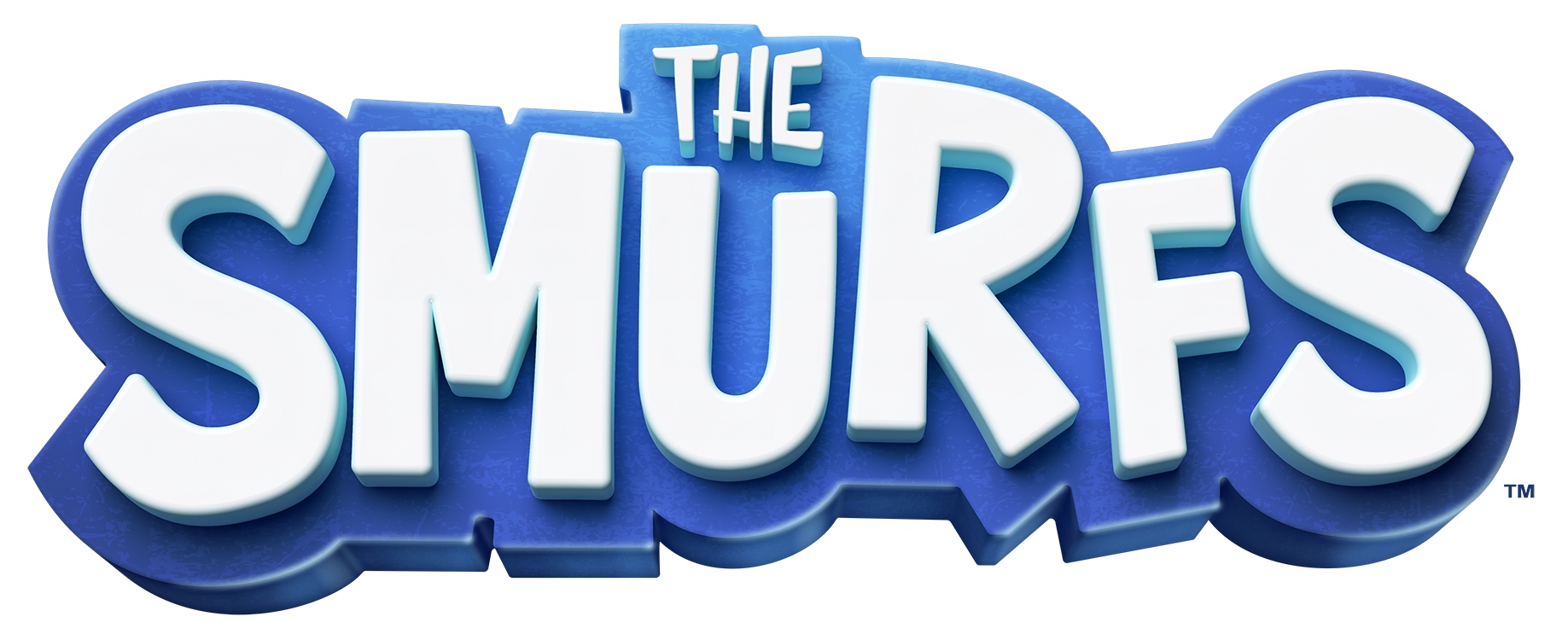
- English logo
- Les Schtroumpfs
- Created by: Dupuis Edition & Audiovisuel; IMPS; Peyo Productions
- Based on: The Smurfs by Peyo
- Developed by: Dupuis Edition & Audiovisuel; IMPS; Peyo Productions
- Directed by: William Renaud
- Creative directors: Luc Parthoens; Tom Cosijn
- Theme music composer: Brad Breeck; Justin Bates
- Composer: Brad Breeck
- Countries of origin: Belgium; France; Germany
- Original languages: English; French
- No. of seasons: 3
- No. of episodes: 156 (+ 1 special) (list of episodes)

Production
- Executive producers: Nele De Wilde; Caroline Duvochel; Caroline Auderbert (S2–present)
- Producer: Véronique Culliford
- Editors: Romain Coudray (animatic editor); Patrick Ducruet (animatic editor); Martin Jay (animatic editor); Alain Lavallé (animatic editor); Marcel Molle (animatic editor); Patrick Ducruet (film editor)
- Running time: 11 minutes
- Production companies: Dupuis Edition & Audiovisuel; Peyo Productions; IMPS Brussels; Dargaud Media (S1); Les Cartooneurs Associés (S2); Ellipsanime Productions (S3–present)

Original release
- Network: La Trois
- Release: 18 April 2021 – present
- Network: TF1
- Release: 9 May 2021 – present
- Network: Ketnet
- Release: 29 October 2021 – present
- Network: KiKA
- Release: 16 April 2022 – present

Related
- The Smurfs (1961 TV series); The Smurfs (1981 TV series)

The Smurfs (French: Les Schtroumpfs) is an animated television series created and developed by Dupuis Edition & Audiovisuel, IMPS and Peyo Productions, in association with KiKA, Ketnet, RTBF, Dargaud Media, Les Cartooneurs Associés in season 2 and Ellipsanime Productions in season 3, with the participation of TF1. It is the third television show based on the Belgian comic franchise of the same name created by Peyo, after the 1961 series and the 1981 series of the same name.

== Voice cast ==
=== Original French voices ===
- Jean-Loup Horwitz as Papa Smurf
- Anna Ramade as Smurfette, and Smurfblossom
- Antoine Schoumsky as Brainy Smurf and Poet Smurf
- Marc Arnaud as Hefty Smurf, Greedy Smurf, and Wild Smurf
- Kaycie Chase as Jokey Smurf, Smurflily, Baby Smurf, and Harmony Smurf
- Jérémy Prévost as Vanity Smurf, Farmer Smurf and Dimwitty Smurf
- Fanny Bloc as Clumsy Smurf, Smurfstorm, and Smurfbegonia
- Xavier Fagnon as Handy Smurf and Reporter Smurf
- Magali Rosenzweig as Smurfwillow, Lazy Smurf, Scaredy Smurf, Painter Smurf, and Leaf
- Emmanuel Curtil as Gargamel, Grouchy Smurf
- Adeline Chetail as Rowena, and Smurffirefly
- Nathalie Homs as Dwayne, and Smurfbubble

=== English Dub Voices ===
- Davis Freeman as Papa Smurf, Farmer Smurf, and Drummer Smurf
- Bérangère McNeese as Smurfette and Baby Smurf (episodes 2–23)
- Youssef El Kaouakibi as Brainy Smurf
- Lenny Mark Irons as Gargamel, Dimwitty Smurf, Bigmouth, Reporter Smurf, Harmony Smurf, Doctor Smurf, and Forgotten Smurf
- Catherine Hershey as Smurfwillow
- Ilse La Monaca as Greedy Smurf
- Tess Bryant as Clumsy Smurf, Scaredy Smurf, and Mummy
- Daniel Sieteiglesias as Vanity Smurf (Note: Is credited as "Daniel Sanz Sieteiglesias".)
- Joshua Rubin as Handy Smurf and Grouchy Smurf
- Vincent Broes as Hefty Smurf and Chef Smurf
- Kaycie Chase as Jokey Smurf, Baby Smurf (episode 28–present) and Wimpy Smurf
- Sandra Asratian as Lazy Smurf, Smurfstorm, and Smurfblossom
- Lawrence Sheldon as Poet Smurf and Painter Smurf (season 1)
- Jackie Jones as Smurflily and Smurffirefly
- Cherise Silvestri as Azrael
- Charlie Cattrall as Tailor Smurf
- Loreanne Asratian as Smurfbegonia and Smurfmeteorite
- Luke Calzonetti as Wild Smurf
- Jade Wheeler as Leaf
- Madeleine Fletcher as Painter Smurf (season 2–present), Timid Smurf and Glee-Go

== Series overview ==
Series	Episodes	Originally released	
Series	Episodes	First released	Last released
1	52	18 April 2021 (Belgium); 6 September 2021 (U.S.)	20 March 2022 (Belgium); 14 July 2022 (U.S.)
2	52	29 August 2022 (Belgium); 18 July 2022 (U.S.)	1 February 2023 (Belgium); 8 December 2023 (U.S.)
3	52	25 August 2024 (Belgium); 2 September 2024 (U.S.)	25 May 2025 (Belgium); 6 December 2025 (U.S.)
Specials	2	TBA (Belgium); 12 October 2026 (U.S.)	TBA (Belgium); TBA (U.S.)

== Production ==
The show was announced by Peyo Productions on August 31, 2017, when Peyo Productions teamed up with Dupuis Audiovisuel, the animation division of Belgian publishing company Dupuis, to produce a new CGI-animated series entitled The Smurfs with Véronique Culliford producing the new CGI-animated series. The next year, its European broadcasters were announced: Ketnet (Flanders), TF1 (France), KiKA (Germany), and La Trois (Wallonia). In 2020, it was reported that the broadcast rights had been picked up by the American entertainment brand Nickelodeon for several of its channels, but the airing agreement does not extend to the original 1980s Smurfs series (which continues to be distributed by Warner Bros. in North America).

The series is almost entirely produced in Belgium, with 75% of the animation completed at Dupuis Edition & Audoovisuel's DreamWall animation studio in the city of Charleroi, while the rest of the animation services was produced at France by Dupuis Edition & Audiovisuel's fellow Anouglême-based French animation production studio Ellipse Studio Angoulême with Réunion-based Gao Shan Pictures co-handling animation services. Its CGI animation is mainly based on the Sony Pictures Animation film Smurfs: The Lost Village, but is an unrelated production.

After 18 months on pay-TV, The Smurfs was made available to stream on Netflix in the United States. The series made its world premiere in 18 April 2021, on the La Trois channel in Belgium.

A second season was announced in February 2022, premiering worldwide on July 18 in the United States. In Belgium, it premiered on August 29, 2022 on OUFtivi. In France, it premiered on October 5, 2022 on TFOU.

On June 12, 2024, a fourth season of the series was confirmed, and the third season was announced to premiere in the summer of 2024 on Nickelodeon. The third season premiered worldwide on August 25, 2024 in Belgium, and September 2, 2024 in the United States.

On June 6, 2025 during the 2025 MIFA Annecy, two standalone episodes were confirmed to be in production when Peyo Productions' parent The Peyo Company partnered with Média-Participations' Belgian animation production studio DreamWall (whom handled animated services for the entire show) and French/Canadian production company Blue Spirit; however, Dupuis Edition & Audiovisuel won't be involved in the episodes, the first of which premiered on October 12, 2026.

== Broadcast ==
It originally premiered in Belgium on April 18, 2021 on La Trois (the RTBF channel), during the Auvio Kids TV (formerly known as OUFtivi programming block. The series premiered on Ketnet in Dutch on October 29, 2021.

In Switzerland, the series premiered on April 25, 2021 on RTS Un, during the RTS Kids programming block.

In France, the series premiered on May 9, 2021 on the TFOU programming block on TF1, later premiered on Nickelodeon France on January 2, 2023. And in Québec from August 28, 2021 in Télé-Québec, under the title Les Schtroumpfs 3D. It has also aired on Telemagino.

In the United States, the series debuted on Nickelodeon on September 10, 2021. This series debuted on Nick Jr. on July 10, 2023.

In Germany, the series premiered on KiKa on April 16, 2022.

In Japan, the series premiered on April 16, 2022 on NHK Educational TV.

In the United Kingdom, the show premiered on November 1, 2021 on Nicktoons, with the same English dub.

In Canada, the show premiered on February 19, 2022 on Family CHRGD before it rebranded on March 1, 2022 into WildBrainTV.

In Latin America, the series first premiered on Paramount+ on November 1, 2021, then the series premiered on Nickelodeon on November 26, 2021 as an exclusive preview until it officially premiered on February 5, 2022.

Since May 2022, the Indonesian-dubbed version of the series currently airs on RTV. The Bengali-dubbed version debuted on Duronto TV in Bangladesh on October 30, 2022.

== Reception ==
Common Sense Media gave the show 2 out of 5 stars and the disclaimer: "Reboot of '80s show focuses on pratfalls, not clever plots."

== Home media ==
Region	Set title	Season(s)	Aspect ratio	Episode count	Time length	Release date
1	Season 1, Volume 1	1	16:9	9	202 minutes	June 14, 2022
1	Season 1, Volume 2	1	16:9	9	202 minutes	October 4, 2022
1	Season 1, Volume 3	1	16:9	8	180 minutes	January 31, 2023
1	The Complete First Season	1	16:9	52	585 minutes	February 18, 2025
