= Music of Curaçao =

The music of Curaçao is known for typical waltzes, danzas, mazurkas and a kind of music called tumba, which is named after the conga drums that accompany it.

== Classical and traditional music of Curaçao ==
The tumba is the most internationally renowned kind of Curaçao music. Tumba is the name of an African-derived rhythm, as are seú and tambú. The Curaçao-born composer Jan Gerard Palm (1831–1906) was the first composer to write music for the lyrics of tumba's. There are traditional lyrics associated with different tumba songs, but they are sometimes scandalous and accusatory, and are thus not always sung. Tumba was known as early as the 19th century, and it is now a popular part of the Carnival Road March.

Besides tumbas, there is a very rich tradition of Antillean waltzes, mazurkas, danzas and pasillos that are popular in Curaçao, Bonaire and Aruba. This music is often referred to as the Classical Music from Curaçao and Aruba. Well known composers of the Netherlands Antilles are Jan Gerard Palm (1831–1906), Chris Ulder (1843–1895), Joseph Sickman Corsen (1853–1911), Paul de Lima (1861–1926), Jacobo Conrad (1879–1918), Rudolph Palm (1880–1950), Charles Maduro (1883–1947), John Palm (1885–1925), Toni Palm (1885–1963), Jacobo Palm (1887–1982) Albert Palm (1903–1958), Edgar Palm (1905–1998), Wim Statius Muller (1930), Robert Rojer (1939) and Randal Corsen (b. 1972). Aruba is well known by its composers Rufo Wever (1917–1977) and Padu Lampe (b. 1925).

Traditional work songs were very diverse on Curaçao, where they were sung in seshi (semi-Papiamento) or Guene. Lyrics were apentatonic.

Tumba is the name of an African-derived rhythm, as are seú and tambú. Traditionally, Afro-Curaçaoan rhythms were often played in the muzik di zumbi style, which included instruments such as the benta (bow harp), gogorobi (rattlers) and flute, which created an ethereal sound.

Tambú (sometimes called the Curaçao blues) was first sung by slaves (mostly women) expressing pain and sadness, usually accompanied by the tambú drum and the agan (a piece of iron or ploughshare) or chapi (a hoe), along with clapping (usually only by the women in the audience).

Previously, drums were outlawed for slaves, and the bastèl, a large calabash in a water barrel, was used instead. It is accompanied by an erotic dance that involves no physical touching. The dance was so racy that the government and the Roman Catholic Church sought to end the practice.

The seú was performed during the harvest festival during traditional times, but is now continued during annual parades in the city of Willemstad. Formerly the seú was a march through the fields, during which the workers brought the crops to the warehouses, the men playing drums, kachu and chapi, while the women carried produce on their heads. It was accompanied by a dance called wapa, which gracefully re-enacted the movements associated with planting and harvesting, often including work songs in Guene, the old slave language. As traditional agriculture began dying out with modern industrialization, the seú too began to fade away. The Curaçao Department of Culture now organizes an annual parade in Willemstad on Easter Monday, which sees as many as 2500 people or more participate.

== Modern music on Curaçao ==
The local Papiamento (Papiamento Song) record industry emerged after the 1950s. Three men were instrumental in this renaissance: Jules de Palm, Rene de Rooy and Pierre Lauffer. They published under the pseudonym Julio Perennal, including a cancionero and a manifesto that called for more Papiamento songs to be written. Many did so, recording throughout the '50s in a mixture of styles, including Cuban and Dominican genres including son montuno, bolero, pambiche, merengue and guaracha. Nowadays the Tumba is especially popular particularly in the Carnival period. Also Ritmo Kombina (literally meaning "combined rhythm") is a combination of different types of music. It is very popular among the young crowd in Curaçao and is played throughout the year.
