= List of composers of Caribbean descent =

This is a list of composers of Caribbean descent. The Caribbean is a region consisting of the Caribbean Sea, its islands (most of which are enclosed by the sea), and the surrounding coasts. The region is located southeast of the Gulf of Mexico and North America, east of Central America, and to the north of South America. The Caribbean has produced many notable composers, who have contributed in a variety of ways to the history of Western classical music.

- Jan Gerard Palm, Curaçao (1831–1906)
- Ignacio Cervantes, Cuba (1847–1905)
- Louis Moreau Gottschalk, New Orleans, United States (1829–1869)
- Ludovic Lamothe, Haiti (1882–1953)
- Rudolph Palm, Curaçao (1880–1950)
- Jacobo Palm, Curaçao (1887–1982)
- John Palm Curaçao (1885–1925)
- Jose de Lima, Curaçao (1890–1972)
- Wim Statius Muller, Curaçao (1930)
- José Luis Rodríguez Vélez, Panama (1915–1984)
