= Shimabara Lullaby =

Shimabara Lullaby (Japanese: 島原の子守唄 or Shimabara no komoriuta) is a folk song-like lullaby by Kohei Miyazaki of Shimabara, Nagasaki Prefecture, Japan.

== General ==
Shimabara Lullaby was written in the early 1950s by Kohei Miyazaki (1917-1980). It is related to the Karayuki-san, the poor Japanese girls sold to work overseas as prostitutes, in Southern China and the Pacific island areas, such as Sandakan on Borneo.

This song became famous when Chiyoko Shimakura recorded it in 1957, followed later the recordings by Peggy Hayama, Hisaya Morishige and others.

== Lyrics ==
The original song had five stanzas, but is usually sung in three stanzas, the first of which starts with:

=== Japanese ===
おどみゃ島原の おどみゃ島原の

=== Romanized Japanese ===
Odomya shimabara no, odomya shimabara no,

=== English translation ===
I was born in Shimabara, I was born in Shimabara,

The lyrics cannot be fully listed for copyright reason.

== See also ==
- Lullaby
- Folk song
- Other Japanese lullabies: Edo Lullaby, Itsuki Lullaby, Takeda Lullaby, Chugoku Region Lullaby, etc.
