= Lists of composers =

This is a list of lists of composers grouped by various criteria.

== Name ==
- List of composers by name

== Women ==
- List of female composers by name
- List of female composers by birth date
- List of Australian female composers

== Genre ==
- Anime composer
- List of Carnatic composers
- List of film score composers
- List of major opera composers
- List of composers of musicals
- List of musicals by composer: A to L, M to Z
- List of ragtime composers
- List of symphony composers
- List of acousmatic-music composers
- List of Spaghetti Western composers
- List of television theme music composers

== Western classical period ==
- List of classical music composers by era
- List of medieval composers
- List of Renaissance composers
- List of Baroque composers
- List of Classical-era composers
- List of Romantic composers
- List of 20th-century classical composers
- List of 21st-century classical composers

== Nationality or ethnicity ==
- List of composers by nationality
- Chronological list of American classical composers
- Chronological list of Argentine classical composers
- Chronological list of Armenian classical composers
- Chronological list of Australian classical composers
- Chronological list of Austrian classical composers
- Chronological list of Belgian classical composers
- Chronological list of Brazilian classical composers
- Chronological list of Bulgarian classical composers
- Chronological list of Canadian classical composers
- Chronological list of Czech classical composers
- Chronological list of English classical composers
- Chronological list of French classical composers
- Chronological list of German classical composers
- Chronological list of Irish classical composers
- Chronological list of Italian classical composers
- Chronological list of Korean classical composers
- Chronological list of Russian classical composers
- Chronological list of Spanish classical composers

== Instrument ==
- List of composers for the classical guitar
- List of organ composers
- List of piano composers
- List of composers and their preferred lyricists
- List of string quartet composers

== Classification ==
- List of Anglican church composers – See also Religious music
- List of composers in the Mannheim school
- List of composers of African descent
- List of composers of Caribbean descent
- List of modernist composers
- List of Byzantine composers
- List of composers in literature

== See also ==
- Lists of musicians
- Lists of singers
- List of singer-songwriters – see also Pop music and Rock music
- List of burial places of classical musicians
