= Nilda Pinto =

Curaçaoan writer of children's books (1918–1954)

Nilda Maria Geerdink-Jesurun Pinto (Willemstad, December 12, 1918 – Hengelo, April 17, 1954) was a Curaçaoan writer of children's books. She was the first to record in Papiamento children's songs and stories from the oral tradition of the Netherlands Antilles.

== Biography ==
Nilda Pinto was born in Otrobanda, Willemstad, as the only child of Henriette de Windt and Samuel Jesurun Pinto, from her father side she had an older sister, Felicia (1915).

After completing her MULO education cycle, Pinto left for Breda, Netherlands in the 1930s to study education. In 1939, she returned to Curaçao and started working at the St. Martinus Gesticht (St. Martinus College), where she had been a student herself.

== Career ==
In addition to her work as a teacher, Pinto strived to make young people more familiar with their own language and culture through the help of her singing and storytelling. Since 1943, she was the producer and presenter of the Papiamento children's hour with songs and stories at the Curom (Curaçao Radio Broadcasting). She had her own children's choir, the Kanariepietjes, which sang regularly on the broadcasts. Later, together with education inspector Jan Droog, she was the broadcaster of the radio program Onder de flamboyan, a talk show with school-aged adolescents.

Pinto was a pioneer with her two collections Corsouw ta kanta (Curaçao sings, 1944) and Corsouw ta konta (Curaçao tells, 1954), in which she collected and recorded short stories and songs for children in her native Papiamento for the first time. They were fables, fairy tales, and tales of Nanzi the spider, which had been until then passed down from grandmother to grandchild. After these collections, Nos dushi Papiamento (Our sweet Papiamento) was published in 1947, a Papiamento textbook written for Dutch speakers who did not know the language. A year later, she published Bam canta (Let's sing) in collaboration with the composer Rudolph Palm. This was a collection of 47 old religious and secular songs and new lyrics, written by approximately 30 local and composers, including Rudolph Palm and Jacobo Palm. It was Curaçao's first fully Papiamento song collection.

In 1952, she published Cuentanan di Nanzi, stories about the spider Nanzi, a common character in Afro-Caribbean and Akan folktales; it was especially this work that contributed to making the Antillean oral art accessible to a wider audience. For the original version of the Nanzi stories, she consulted works in the West Indische Gids from 1937, which she adapted to Papiamento and adapted for children. In 1970, the Nanzi stories were adapted into Dutch by Jan Droog under the title Biba Nanzi! Series of folktales from the Netherlands Antilles retold from Papiamento. An English translation by the Scottish linguist Richard Wood, was later published. In 1972, Radio Netherlands Worldwide produced for TeleCuraçao a 10-chapters television series of the adventures of "Compa Nanzi", based on the stories from Cuentanan di Nanzi.

In 2005, a compilation of her antillean folk tales was published under the name Kon Nanzi a nèk Shon Arei i otro kuentanan antiano di e araña sabí by the Zirkoon Publishing House, with texts in Papiamento and Dutch.

== Personal life ==
After World War II, she met Jan Geerdink, a machinist of the Royal Netherlands Navy, in Curaçao. They married on December 24, 1948, in a civil ceremony and on December 27, 1948, at a religious ceremony at the Santa Anna Church. Together, they had 3 children: 1 daughter, born in 1950 and 2 sons, born in 1951 and 1952, respectively. On March 20, 1953, the couple moved to Hengelo in the Netherlands. Pinto died there at the age of 35, due to complications related to her fourth pregnancy.

As a posthumous tribute to Pinto, a street in the Willemstad suburb of Brievengat was named in 1959, and a school for secondary vocational education was inaugurated in the Wageningenstraat in Willemstad in 1962.

== Trivia ==
In the city of Amsterdam, Netherlands there is a street named after her, Nilda Pintostraat.

== Works ==
- Corsouw ta kanta (1944)
- Nos dushi papiamento (1947)
- Bam canta (1948)
- Cuentanan di Nanzi (1952)
- Corsouw ta konta (1954)
