= Lullaby =

Soothing children's song

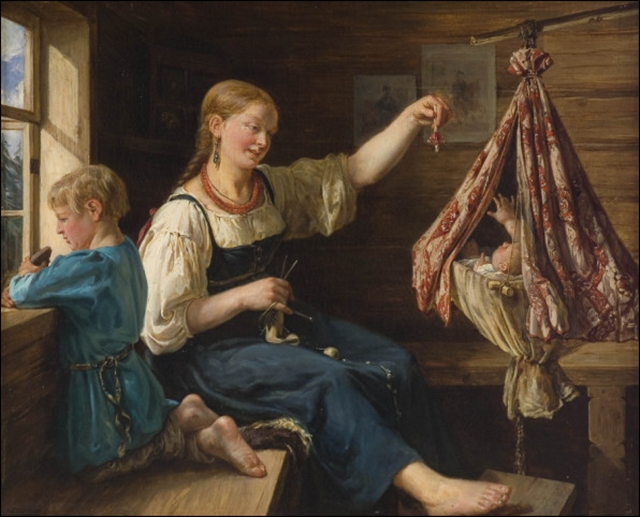
Lullaby by François Nicholas Riss

A lullaby (/ˈlʌləbaɪ/), or a cradle song, is a soothing song or piece of music usually played for (or sung to) children (for adults, see music and sleep). The purpose of lullabies vary. In some societies, they are used to pass down cultural knowledge or tradition. In addition, lullabies are often used for the developing of communication skills, indication of emotional intent, maintenance of infants' undivided attention, modulation of infants' arousal, and regulation of behavior. Perhaps one of the most important uses of lullabies is as a sleep aid for infants. As a result, the music is often simple and repetitive. Lullabies can be found in many countries and have existed since ancient times.

== Etymology ==
Traditional Welsh lullaby Suo Gan sung by Susan Bullock

Traditional lullaby from Macastre, Spain, recorded in 1975

The term 'lullaby' derives from the Middle English lullen ("to lull") and by[e] (in the sense of "near"). It was first recorded circa 1560.

A folk etymology derives lullaby from "Lilith-Abi" (Hebrew for "Lilith, begone"). In the Jewish tradition, Lilith was a demon who was believed to steal children's souls in the night. To guard against Lilith, Jewish mothers would hang four amulets on nursery walls with the inscription "Lilith – abei" ["Lilith – begone"].

== Characteristics ==
Assamese folk lullaby song by Tarulata Saikia from Pirakota Bharolowa Gaon, Kakojan, Assam, India

Telegu lullaby-'Cēta venna mudda'

Lullabies tend to share exaggerated melodic tendencies, including simple pitch contours, large pitch ranges, and higher pitch. These clarify and convey heightened emotions, usually of love or affection. When there is harmony, infants almost always prefer consonant intervals over dissonant intervals. Furthermore, if there is a sequence of dissonant intervals in a song, an infant will usually lose interest, and it becomes very difficult to regain their attention. To reflect this, most lullabies contain primarily consonant intervals. Tonally, most lullabies are simple, often alternating tonic and dominant harmonies.

In addition to pitch tendencies, lullabies share structural similarities. The most frequent tendencies are intermittent repetitions and long pauses between sections. This dilutes the rate of material and appeals to infants' slower capacity for processing music.

Rhythmically, there are shared patterns. Lullabies are usually in triple meter or 6/8 time, giving them a "characteristic swinging or rocking motion." This mimics the movement a baby experiences in the womb as a mother moves. In addition, infants' preference for rhythm shares a strong connection with what they hear when they are bounced, and even their own body movements. The tempos of lullabies tend to be generally slow, and the utterances are short. This also aids in the infant's processing of the song.

Lullabies almost never have instrumental accompaniments. Infants have shown a strong preference for unaccompanied lullabies over accompanied lullabies. Again, this appeals to infants' more limited ability to process information.

Lullabies are often used for their soothing nature, even for non-infants. One study found lullabies to be the most successful type of music or sound for relieving stress and improving the overall psychological health of pregnant women.

These characteristics tend to be consistent across cultures. It was found that adults of various cultural backgrounds could recognize and identify lullabies without knowing the cultural context of the song. Infants have shown a strong preferences for songs with these qualities.

== Cross-cultural prevalence ==
Lullabies are often used to pass down or strengthen the cultural roles and practices. In an observation of the setting of lullabies in Albanian culture, lullabies tended to be paired with the rocking of the child in a cradle. This is reflected in the swinging rhythmicity of the music. In addition to serving as a cultural symbol of the infant's familial status, the cradle's presence during the singing of lullabies helps the infant associate lullabies with falling asleep and waking up. Kogan and Gintsburg, in a study of the mainly preliterate, non-media-exposed people on the island of Socotra, found that lullabies in this culture shared many of the features of lullabies in the western and oriental tradition: the repetition of 'nonsense syllables,' the creation of a warm affective space, and the allusions to ancient customs and beliefs. On the other hand, these lullabies lacked the 'counting elements' found in other traditions, and defined safety as a spiritual space, while danger was conceptualised as both physical and spiritual.

== Therapeutic value ==
Studies conducted by Dr. Jeffery Perlman, chief of newborn medicine at NewYork–Presbyterian Hospital's Komansky Center for Children's Health, find that gentle music therapy not only slows down the heart rate of prematurely delivered infants but also helps them feed and sleep better. This helps them gain weight and speeds their recovery. A study published in May 2013 in the Journal of the American Academy of Pediatrics under the aegis of the Beth Israel Medical Center in New York City found that the type of music matters. Therapeutically designed "live" music – and lullabies sung in person – can influence cardiac and respiratory function. Another study published in February 2011 in Arts in Psychotherapy by Jayne M. Standley of the National Institute for Infant and Child Medical Music Therapy at Florida State University suggests that babies who receive this kind of therapy leave the hospital sooner.

Additional research by Jayne M. Standley has demonstrated that the physiological responses of prematurely delivered infants undergoing intensive care can be regulated by listening to gentle lullabies through headphones. In addition to slowing heart and respiration rates, lullabies have been associated with increased oxygen saturation levels and the possible prevention of potentially life-threatening episodes of apnea and bradycardia. Gentle music can also provide stimulation for premature infants to behave in ways that boost their development and keep them alive. Lullabies can serve as a low-risk source of stimulation and reinforcement for increasing nipple sucking (feeding) rates, providing infants with the nutrition they require for growth and development. Lullabies are thus associated with encouraging the rapid development of the neurological system and with a shorter length of hospitalization.

More recent research has shown that lullabies sung live can have beneficial effects on physiological functioning and development in premature infants. The live element of a slow, repetitive entrained rhythm can regulate sucking behavior. Infants have a natural tendency to entrain to the sounds that surround them. Beat perception begins during fetal development in the womb and infants are born with an innate musical preference. The element of live breathing sounds can regulate infant heart rate, quiet-alert states, and sleep. Live lullabies can also enhance parent-child bonding, thus decreasing parental stress associated with the intensive care. In short, live lullabies sung by music therapists induce relaxation, rest, comfort, and optimal growth and development. "Hush, Little Baby" has been observed cross-culturally and is known to have a natural capacity for soothing and energizing infants, as well as nurturing caregiving bonds.

Many lullabies, regardless of the meaning of their words, possess a peaceful hypnotic quality. Others are mournful or dark, like a lament. The Gaelic lullaby "Ba, Ba, Mo Leanabh Beag" was written in 1848 during the potato famine, which caused much hardship in the Scottish Highlands. The song mentions soft potatoes, the mother's situation, and her fears for her child. In the 1920s, poet Federico García Lorca studied Spanish lullabies and noted the "poetic character" and "depth of sadness" of many of them. Lorca's theory was that a large part of the function of the lullaby is to help a mother vocalize her worries and concerns. In short, they also serve as therapy for the mother.

Combined with lament, lullaby can have "restorative resounding" properties for hospice inpatients and their families. Lullabies typically soothe people through the awake/sleep transition, and similarly can soothe people through the life/death transition. Music therapists have called these tunes "lullaments", that which sustain the spirit, support psychological structure, and enable resilience during times of vulnerability to the effects of adversity. Lullaments are music-contextualized expressions of attachment and detachment, sadness/tears and happiness/laughter, privilege and loss, nurturance and grief, deterioration, stasis and moving forward.

Many Christmas carols are designed as lullabies for the infant Jesus, the most famous of them being "Silent Night".

== Mother–infant interaction ==
Infants exhibit a natural preference for infant-directed over non-infant-directed lullabies and their own mothers' voice over that of another female.

Much research has been generated on the role of lullabies in nurturing caregiving bonds between mother and child. Mothers who sing lullabies to their infants engage in a bonding activity that actually alters the underlying neural structure of the infant brain such that the infant becomes "tuned" into music and its association with parental affiliation. In one Taiwanese study of Kangaroo Care, a technique practiced on newborn infants in which a mother holds her child tightly against her chest, it was demonstrated that infant–mother dyads who listened to their choice of lullaby were associated with more quiet sleep states and less occurrence of crying by the infant and were also associated with significantly lower maternal anxiety, than those dyads who did not listen to lullabies. The therapeutic effect of lullabies can thus have a strong impact on calming anxieties and nurturing bonds, which is especially important with premature and fragile infants.

== In classical music ==
Lullabies written by established classical composers are often given the form-name berceuse, which is French for lullaby, or cradle song. The most famous lullaby is the one by Johannes Brahms ("Wiegenlied", 1868). While there has been no confirmation, there are many strong arguments that Brahms suffered from a sleep disorder known as sleep apnea. It is speculated (based on lullabies' utility as a sleep aid) that this was part of his inspiration for composing "Wiegenlied."

Chopin's "Berceuse" is a composition for solo piano. Other famous examples of the genre include Maurice Ravel's Berceuse sur le nom de Gabriel Fauré for violin and piano; the Berceuse élégiaque by Ferruccio Busoni; the "Berceuse" from the opera Jocelyn by Benjamin Godard; the "Berceuse" by Igor Stravinsky which is featured in the Firebird ballet, and Lullaby for String Quartet by George Gershwin. The English composer Nicholas Maw's orchestral nocturne, The World in the Evening, is subtitled "lullaby for large orchestra". German composer's Paul Graener last movement of his suite From The Realm of Pan is entitled "Pan sings the world a lullaby".

A Tamil thaalattu (lullaby) recorded at Salem Mettur

== By geography ==
=== Americas ===
==== Brazil ====
"Dorme neném" (Sleep Little Baby) is sung all over the country and includes a reference to "Cuca", a folk character very feared by children.

==== Colombia ====
"Duérmete niño, duérmete ya, que si no viene el coco y te comerá" (Go to sleep child, go to sleep now, otherwise the boogie man will come and eat you) is a cradle song sung by parents to advise children to go to sleep soon.

=== Asia ===
==== India ====
In Hindi and in many Indian languages, the lullaby is called "Lori". Mostly, lullabies are sung in folk languages. Lullabies have been also an integral part of Indian cinema. Many lullabies were written and composed in the fifties, such as:

- "Aaja Ri Aa Nindiya Tu Aa" – Do Bigha Zamin (1953 film)
- "Main Gaoon Tu Chhup Ho Jaa" – Do Aankhen Barah Haath (1957 film)
- "So Jaa Re Lalna Jhulao Tohe Palna" – Pardesi (1957 film)

In the Malayalam language, there is a rich collection of traditional lullabies, known as "tharaattu Pattu". One of the most famous is "Omanathinkal Kidavo", written and composed by poet lyricist Iravi Varman Thampi who is widely known as Irayimman Thampi. This lullaby was written in the year 1813 for the queen of Travancore to sing to her son young prince Swathi Thirunal, who later became the king and a famous musician (composed many Keerthanas in a Raga Dheerasankarabharanam commonly known as Sankarabharanam).

In the Marathi language, a lullaby is called a angai geet. Soothing words and music helps baby calm down and help them sleep.

In the Odia language, a lullaby is called a Nanabaya gita. A book in the same name by Nanda Kishore bal that was published in two volumes in 1934 is a major compilation of the known lullabies in the language.

In the Tamil language, a lullaby is called a thaalattu (thal means "tongue"). A melodious sound is created by frequent movement of the tongue at the beginning of the song. In the 9th century CE, Kulasekhara Alvar composed the lullaby titled "Mannu pugazh Kosalai than" (meaning "To famous Kausalya...") in honour of Rama.

In Telugu language, a lullaby is called a "Jola" or "Jola pata". A famous Telugu lullaby is "jo achuthaa nanda jo jo mukunda".

==== Philippines ====
In the Philippines, the song is known as the oyayi. The province of Batangas has a very specialized form of lullaby known as the huluna. Though only composed of simple words, it is notable for being very difficult to sing, due to the lengthy melismas. Like many traditional songs from Spain, it is full of fioriture yet unlike many of the western type songs, it has no time signature. Sa Ugoy ng Duyan is a popular Filipino lullaby song composed by Lucio San Pedro with lyrics by Levi Celerio in 1948.

==== Kurdistan ====
In Kurdish lullaby is called Laylaye or Lawk is a prominent piece of art in Kurdish society, and mostly women and mothers sing this, which usually means the oppression and genocide of the Kurds, or a reason away from someone or homeland.

==== Vietnam ====
In Vietnamese, lullabies are called "bài hát ru". One famous Vietnamese lullaby is the song, "Ầu ơ ví dầu". Vietnamese lullabies are hard to sing because of their extended melismas. The lullabies usually include pastoral scenes of villages, bamboo bridges, rice fields, farming, and meals made by a mother. They usually have a melancholy tone.

==== China ====
- The "Northeastern Cradle Song" is from northern China.
- Cantonese cradle song "Yuet Kwong Kwong" (月光光), literally Moonlight, prevails in Guangdong.

==== Indonesia ====
"Nina Bobo" is from Indonesia.

==== Japan ====
The "Edo Lullaby", "Itsuki Lullaby", "Chūgoku Region Lullaby", "Shimabara Lullaby" and "Takeda Lullaby" are from Japan.

==== Bangladesh ====
In Bangladesh, the lullaby is termed "Ghum-Parrani-Gaan" (song to make sleep). Examples of Bangla lullabies are "Ghum-Parrani Maashi, Pishi" and "Baash baganer mathar upor".

==== Iran ====
"Laay laay, laay, laay, gol-e laaleh" (Persian: لای لای، لای، لای، گل لاله) is one of the most famous and oldest Persian lullabies which comes from the Gorgan region in North-Eastern Iran.

=== Europe ===
==== Czech ====
"Spi, Janíčku, spi" ("Sleep, Johny, sleep") – This playful lullaby was collected in Moravia by František Sušil (1804–1868), a priest and an activist of Czech national revival. He collected songs in Moravia and Silesia as well as in Slavic villages in Austria. This lullaby uses a specific name of the child, Janíček, a familiar form of the very common male name Jan. Nonsense is employed here, as the boy is promised not only a green and a red apple but also a blue one if he falls asleep.

"Ukolébavka" ("Lullaby") – This lullaby was published in 1633 in The Informatorium of the School of Infancy by Johann Amos Comenius (1592–1670). The book is likely to be the first treatise on the development and educating infants and children up to six in the family. Comenius stressed among other things the necessity of sensory and emotional stimuli at an early age. Thus, he included for mothers and nurses the Czech text and the score of the originally German lullaby by 16th century preacher Mathesius.

"Hajej, můj andílku" ("Sleep, My Little Angel") – This is one of the most melodious Czech lullabies, first collected by Karel Jaromír Erben (1811–1870), Czech romantic writer, poet and collector of Czech folk songs and fairy tales. The text refers specifically to the mother rocking her baby.

"Halí, dítě" ("Hullee, baby") – This lullaby was collected by František Bartoš (1837–1906), pedagogue and ethnographer who collected Moravian songs. The second line says the carer will leave after the child falls asleep, but in the third line we learn that only to the garden in the valley to pick raspberries.

"Halaj, belaj, malučký" ("Sleep, Sleep, Little One") – This lullaby is from the east of Moravia, where the dialect is influenced by the Slovak language, and also folk songs are similar to the Slovak ones from across the border. A boy is promised the essential food for infants, kašička, a smooth mixture made of milk and flour.

==== Danish ====
"Elefantens vuggevise" ("The Elephant's Lullaby") – This lullaby is considered one of the most popular lullabies in Denmark. Using exotic animals as theme, the lyrics are simple and easily understood by a child. It was made politically correct in the 1990s: The word negerdreng (Negro boy) was changed to kokosnød (coconut). The song was written in 1948 by the Danish writer and poet Harald H. Lund with music composed by writer-musician Mogens Jermiin Nissen (1906–72).

"Godnatsang" ("Goodnight Song") – This is a popular lullaby that was composed (lyrics and music) by Sigurd Barrett (born 1967), pianist, composer and host of a children's TV programme in Denmark, and fellow musician Steen Nikolaj Hansen. Sigurd usually sings this song at the end of his children's show. This lullaby has sleeping time as theme: The day is over and we must sleep and rest so we will be fresh again in the morning.

"Mues sang få Hansemand" ("Mother's Song to Little Hans") – This lullaby originated from south Jutland and is very old (year of composition is unknown). It is not well known in Denmark. This may, in part, be due to the fact that it was written in Jutlandic dialect. The lyrics were written by Marie Thulesen (1878–1924) with music by the Danish musician Oluf Ring (1884–1946).

"Jeg vil tælle stjernerne" ("I Will Count the Stars") – This lullaby was written in 1951 by the Danish poet and writer Halfdan Rasmussen (1915–2002). Rasmussen had written numerous rhymes and jingles, some of which are still being used in Danish beginner classes in public schools (e.g. the picture book "Halfdans ABC"). This lullaby's music was composed by Hans Dalgaard (1919–81). The song is a simple story of a child who tries to count the stars with his/her fingers and toes.

==== Dutch ====
"Slaap kindje slaap" – The text is mostly chosen for its rhyme. Sleep, little child, sleep. Outside a sheep is walking. A sheep with white feet, it drinks its milk so sweet.

"Maantje tuurt, maantje gluurt" – Older Dutch lullaby. Look the moon peeps and spies through the window. Have the children already gone to bed? Yes moon, they're lying in bed. Good, tomorrow will be a new day of playing and learning.

==== English ====
Many medieval English verses associated with the birth of Jesus take the form of a lullaby, including "Lullay, my liking, my dere son, my sweting" and may be versions of contemporary lullabies. However, most of those used today date from the seventeenth century onwards. Some of the best known English-language lullabies originate from the US, notably "Bye, baby Bunting" and "Hush, Little Baby".

==== German ====
"Der Mond ist aufgegangen" ("The moon has risen"), "Es kam ein Herr zum Schlößli" ("A knight came to the castle"), "Guten Abend, gute Nacht" ("Good evening, good night"), "Weißt du, wie viel Sternlein stehen" ("Do you know how many stars there are?") and "Schlaf, Kindlein, schlaf" ("Sleep, dear child, sleep") became widely known in the 18th and 19th century and still are.

==== Hungarian ====
The Hungarian words for "lullaby" are altatódal, 'put-to-sleep song', altató, '[something that] puts [someone] to sleep', and bölcsődal, 'cradle song'. Another, now archaic and little-used word is csucsujgató, '[something that] puts [someone] to sleep; nuzzling/cuddling [song]'. In Hungary, lullabies did not develop into an independent genre, and most folk lullabies are from before the Hungarian conquest of the Carpathian Basin (Hungarian: honfoglalás, lit. 'conquest of the homeland'). Relatively little foreign impact can be seen in them, but many changes came from their use in schools. A discernable subtype are Mária-énekek, 'Mary songs', Christmas lullabies sung in the name of Mary, mother of Jesus. Most cradle-songs use ringatószavak, 'rocking words' that are meaningless, archaic, or come from baby talk, as well as many terms of endearment such as baba, bogárka, csibe, angyal, kedves, rózsabimbó, 'baby, beetle, chick, angel, dear, rosebud', some of which they share with love songs. They usually have only one verse and short lines.

Examples
Hungarian lyrics	Literal English translation	Place of origin	Notes
Aludj, baba, aludjál! Aranyosat álmodjál: A ragyogó csillagokról, Dunán ringó kis ladikról. Aludj, baba, aludjál, Tündérekről álmodjál; Dunán ringó kis ladikban Velük szépen játszódjál!	Sleep, baby, sleep Have sweet dreams About the shining stars About a small boat rocking on the Danube. Sleep, baby, sleep Dream about fairies In a small boatrocking on the Danube; Play with them nicely.	Dunasziget, Győr-Moson-Sopron County	This lullaby showcases the trend of wishing or promising sweet dreams and/or good sleep to the child. Somewhat unusually, it has more than one verse.
Csicsija, babája! Nincs itthun (Note: Form of the word 'itthon' in the Central Transdanubian dialect of Hungarian.) a mamája: Elment a vásárba, Cukrot hoz a kosárba; Ha jó lesz az Annuska, Megkapja holnapra.	Shush, baby Her mum is not at home She has gone to the marketplace She will bring candy in the basket If little Annie will be good She will get it for tomorrow.	Súr, Komárom-Esztergom County	Here, the 'ringatószó', 'csicsija' is used to calm the infant. This song is an example of promising some reward if the child will sleep and behave well, also common in Hungarian lullabies.
Tente, baba, tente, Elgyütt (Note: Pronunciation of 'eljött' in the Palóc/Northeastern dialect of Hungarian.) már az este. Aludj, ingó-bingó Piros rózsabimbó!	Sleep, baby, sleep The evening has already come Sleep, swinging Red rosebud!	Jászárokszállás, Jász-Nagykun-Szolnok County	Note the presence of another 'ringatószó', 'tente' and the term of endearment rózsabimbó, 'rosebud'.
Tente, tente, kisbaba, Anyádnak sok a dóga: (Note: Form of the word 'dolga' in the Palóc/Northeastern dialect of Hungarian.); Mos, ruhát szappanoz; Egykettőre kimossa, Gyorsan ki is vasalja, A kötélre akasztja. Mire felkél (Note: Archaic form of the word 'felkel'.) a baba, Ki is legyen vasalva.	Sleep, sleep, little baby Your (Note: Hungarian folk lullabies always use the informal voice ('te'), which could only be literally translated into English with the archaic pronoun 'thou'.) mother has much to do She washes, she soaps clothes She will wash it in no time And also irons it quickly Hangs it on the rope So that by the time the baby wakes up It should also be ironed.	Nagyrozvágy, Borsod-Abaúj-Zemplén County	Apart from 'tente' being used here, too, this is an example of including lines on the troubles or works of parents, commonly found in Hungarian lullabies.

==== Irish ====
- The Kildare Poems (mid-14th century), among the earliest English language literature in Ireland, include the lullaby Lollai, Lollai, litil child.
- "I've Found My Bonny Babe a Nest" was published in 1901 by Charles Villiers Stanford; it is believed to be much older.
- "Too-Ra-Loo-Ra-Loo-Ral (That's an Irish Lullaby)" is a famous fictional Irish lullaby, written in 1913 by the Irish-American composer James Royce Shannon.
- "Whisht Wee Bairn" ('be quiet, small child') is an Ulster Scots lullaby.
- "Seoithín Seothó" (Hushaby, Hush; also spelled Seó hín seó, Shoheen Sho) is a noted Irish language lullaby.
- In 1999, Pádraigín Ní Uallacháin produced an album of Irish lullabies (in English and Irish), entitled An Irish Lullaby.

==== Russian ====
"Cossack Lullaby" is a cradle song which Russian writer and poet Mikhail Lermontov transcribed from a Terek Cossack woman's singing in Ossetia in the 19th century.

==== Scottish ====
There are many lullabies in Scottish song tradition, with well-known examples in Scottish Gaelic, Scots and English. They include songs which express emotions other than affection for the child – notably "Griogal Cridhe", which commemorates the beheading of Gregor Roy MacGregor by his father-in-law, Campbell of Glenlyon and brother-in-law in 1570 and "Hishie Ba" which may refer to a gang assault. A number of traditional lullabies also express social issues and this has been continued in modern lullaby writing in Scotland, notably Jim MacLean's "Smile in Your Sleep" (also known as "Hush, Hush, Time to Be Sleeping"), Matt McGinn's "Miner's Lullaby" (also known as "Coorie Doon") and Karine Polwart's "Baleerie Baloo". Christina Stewart's kist o dreams project provides a resource of over 30 Scottish lullabies, ranging from Doric Scots of the North East, to Northern Isles dialect of Shetland, Scottish Gaelic and English language examples.

==== Ukrainian ====
Oi Khodyt Son Kolo Vikon (The Dream Passes by the Windows) is from Ukraine.

==== Welsh ====
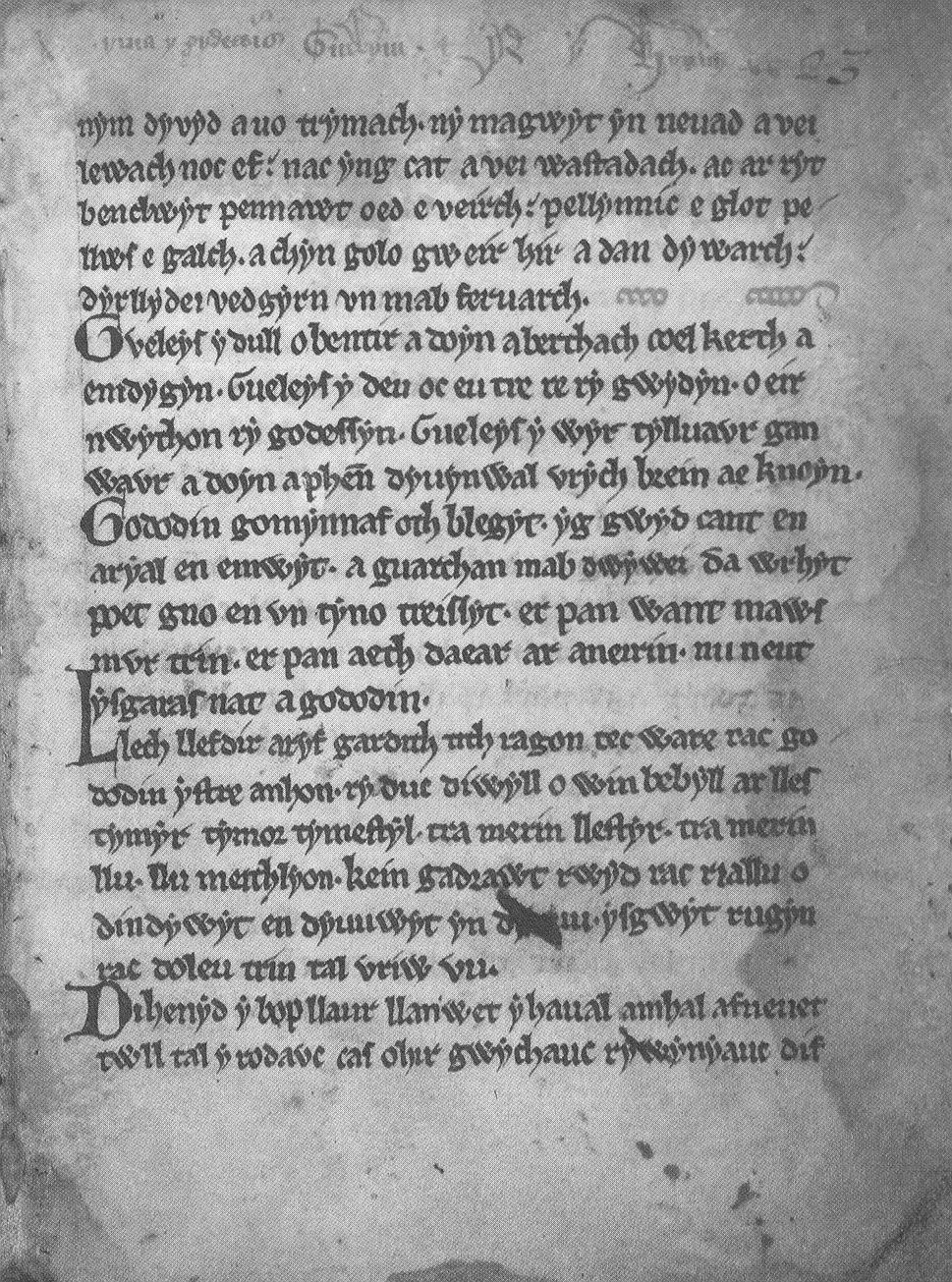
the lullaby is preserved in the 13th century Book of Aneirin but linguistic analysis suggests it is much older.

The oldest known Welsh-language lullaby is "Dinogad's Smock" (Old Welsh: Peis Dinogat; Welsh: Pais Dinogad). Although the lullaby is preserved in the 13th century Book of Aneirin, its unusual linguistics suggest the original lullaby may have been composed in Common Brittonic a language spoken across the island of Britain until the 6th century AD. The lullaby also gives an insight into the Gododdin a Celtic culture of northern England and southern Scotland, as well as linguistic evidence for features of the extinct Cumbric language. It has also been used to provide evidence of the fauna of central Britain during this period and the late survival of the Eurasian Lynx in Britain.

Another traditional Welsh lullaby "Suo Gân" gained popularity in the late twentieth century. Although the earliest prints date from around 1800, new arrangements of the lullaby have been performed and recorded by artists from around the world as well as featuring in Hollywood films (Empire of the Sun), anime (Black Butler) and computer games (Maid of Sker). Suo Gân's distinctive tune has also been repurposed for several Christian hymns.

=== Oceania ===
==== Australia ====
"Curly Headed Babby" (also known as "Lula Lula Lula Lula Bye Bye") was composed by George H. Clutsam in 1897. It was made famous through a recording by Paul Robeson.

==== New Zealand ====
"Hine E Hine" is a Māori lullaby written by Te Rangi Pai in 1907.

== See also ==
- Pacifier-activated lullaby
- Lullabies from the Axis of Evil
