= Statius (disambiguation) =

Statius is a Latin or Italic personal name, or praenomen, which gave rise to a patronymic surname. Prominent individuals with this name include:

- Statius Albius Oppianicus, discussed by Marcus Tullius Cicero in his oration, Pro Cluentio.
- Caecilius Statius (c. 220 - c. 166 BC), early Roman comic poet.
- Publius Papinius Statius, a Roman poet of the Silver Age of Latin literature.
- Achilles Statius, a 16th-century Portuguese humanist and writer.
- Philipp Ludwig Statius Müller, an 18th-century German zoologist.
- Wim Statius Muller, a contemporary Antillean composer and pianist.

Statius may also refer to:

- Sint Eustatius, an island in the Caribbean

== See also ==
- Statius (praenomen)
