= No Game =

- Origin: Curaçao
- Genres: Popular music
- Years active: 2004–present

No Game was a popular band from Curaçao. The group exist of several vocalists, including Reinier Lijfrock, who has been crowned to Tumba-king, and drummers.

== Discography ==
- 2005 - Kurason óf Kónsenshi
