= Tambu =

Tambu may refer to:

== Music ==
- Tambú (drum), drum especially from Curaçao
- Tambu (music), a drum, genre of music and dance from the Caribbean
- Tambu (album), a 1995 album by the band Toto

== Other ==
- Mount Tambu, New Guinea, site of the 1943 Battle of Mount Tambu
- Tambu or Tabu, the shell money of the Tolai people.

=== Fiction ===
- Tambu, a 1979 novel by Robert Asprin
- Tambu, a fictional island in the 1976 Australian television series The Lost Islands.
