= Takeda Lullaby =

Popular Japanese cradle song

"竹田の子守唄"

Song
- Language: Japanese
- English title: Takeda Lullaby
- Genre: Lullaby

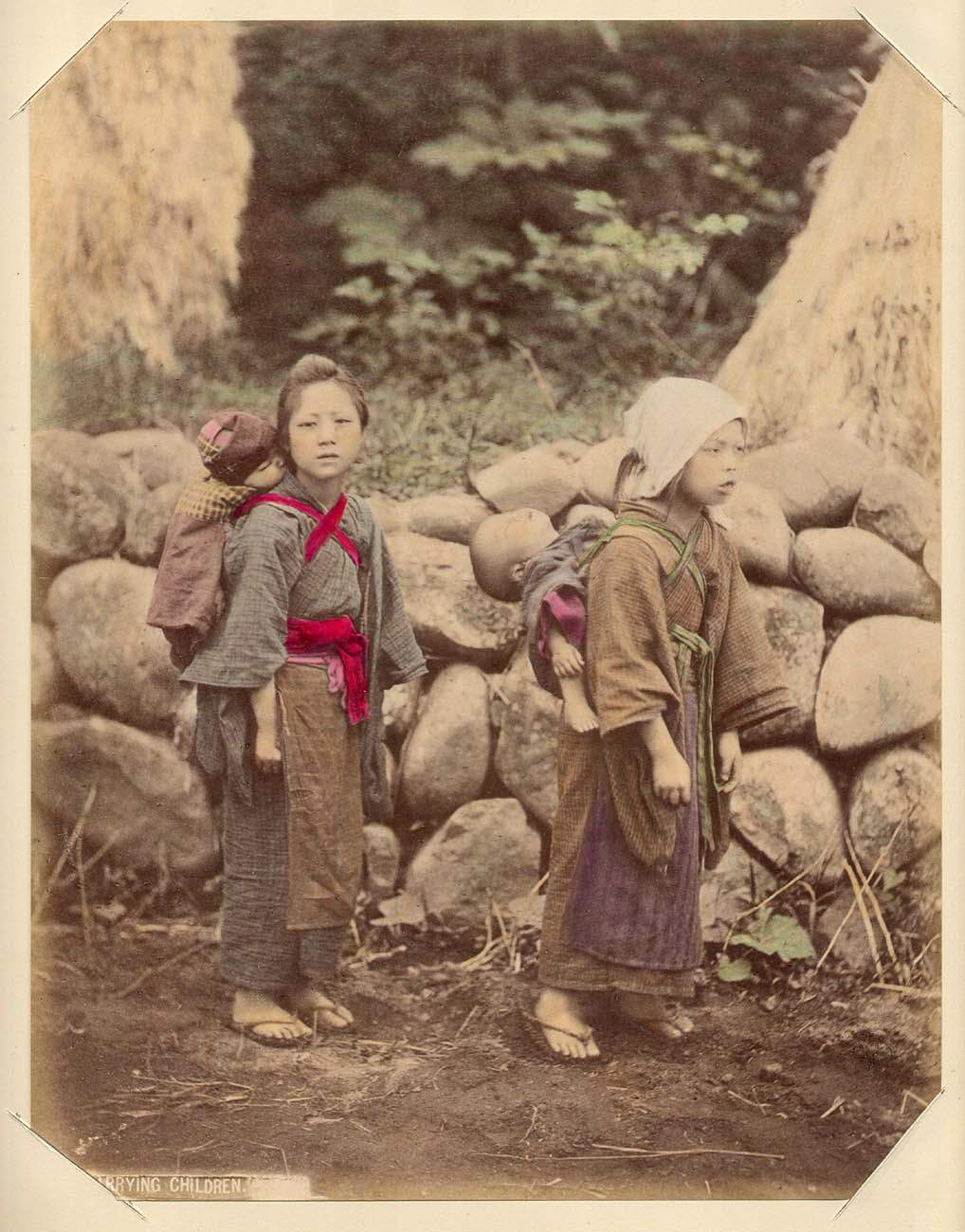
Young babysitters during the Meiji era, photographed by Kusakabe Kimbei

"Takeda Lullaby" (竹田の子守唄, Takeda no komoriuta) is a popular Japanese cradle song. It originated in Takeda, Fushimi, Kyoto.

== Background ==
The song has long been sung by the people in the burakumin areas of Kyoto and Osaka in a slightly different form. During the 1960s, it was picked up as a theme song by the Buraku Liberation League, particularly its branch at Takeda.

Burakumin ("hamlet people") were an outcast community at the bottom of the Japanese social order that had historically been the victims of severe discrimination and ostracism. These communities were often made up of those with occupations considered impure or tainted by death (e.g., executioners, undertakers, workers in slaughterhouses, butchers, or tanners). Professions such as these had severe social stigmas of kegare, or "defilement", attached to them. A burakumin neighborhood within metropolitan Tokyo was the last to be served by streetcar and is the site of butcher and leather shops to this day.

In this lullaby, a young girl comforts herself by singing about her miserable situation. One day, she is forcibly sent away to work for a rich family at a village across the mountain. Every day as she works with a baby on her back, she is reminded of her family, looking at the silhouette of the mountains in the direction of her homeland.

=== Recordings ===
The first known recording of the song was made in 1967 by the Japanese musician Kyōko Takada, during her days as a folk singer.

In 1969, the folk singing group Akai Tori (赤い鳥) popularized the song, recording a best-selling single in 1971.

The song was popularised in Taiwan through a 1975 adaptation sung by Judy Ongg, with Chinese lyrics written by her father, Ongg Ping-tang (翁炳榮). Compared to the original, the Taiwanese version had nothing to do with discrimination but was titled "qidao" (simplified Chinese: 祈祷; traditional Chinese: 祈禱; pinyin: qídǎo; lit. 'pray') and focused on hope. This version is often taught in primary schools.

In 2001, singer Eri Sugai included a version of the song on her album Mai.

In 2017, the folk supergroup Bendith included a Welsh-language version on their self-titled EP.

== Lyrics ==
=== Japanese ===
守も嫌がる 盆から先にゃ
雪もちらつくし 子も泣くし

盆が来たとて 何嬉しかろ
帷子は無し 帯は無し

この子よう泣く 守をばいじる
守も一日 痩せるやら

早よも行きたや この在所越えて
向こうに見えるは 親の家
向こうに見えるは 親の家

=== Romanized Japanese (Romaji) ===
Mori mo iyagaru, Bon kara saki nya
Yuki mo chiratsuku shi, Ko mo naku shi

Bon ga kita tote, Nani ureshikaro
Katabira wa nashi, Obi wa nashi

Kono ko yō naku, Mori wo ba ijiru
Mori mo ichinichi, Yaseru-yara

Hayo-mo yukitaya, Kono zaisho koete
Mukō ni mieru wa, Oya no uchi
Mukō ni mieru wa, Oya no uchi

=== English translation ===
I would hate babysitting beyond the Bon Festival.
The snow begins to fall, and the baby cries.

How can I be happy, even when Bon festival is here?
I don't have nice clothes, I don't have an obi sash to wear.

This child continues to cry, and is mean to me.
Every day, I grow thinner.

I would quickly quit here and go back.
To the other side (of the mountain) I can see, my parents' house.
To the other side (of the mountain) I can see, my parents' house.

== See also ==
- Other Japanese lullabies: Itsuki Lullaby, Edo Lullaby, Chugoku Region Lullaby, Shimabara Lullaby, etc.
