= Itsuki Lullaby =

Japanese folk song and lullaby

Itsuki Lullaby (in Japanese: 五木の子守唄 Itsuki no komoriuta) is a lullaby known widely in Japan, and is a folk song representative of Itsuki Village, Kuma District, Kumamoto Prefecture, on Kyūshū Island.

== Lyrics ==
There are the most common version and the original version of this lullaby, sung in the Itsuki Village dialect.

=== Most common version ===
In Japanese
1. Odoma bon-giri bonri,
  Bon kara sakya oran-do
  Bon ga hayo kurya,
  Hayo modoru.
2. Odoma kanjin -kanjin,
  Anhito-tacha yoka-shu
  Yoka-hu yokasash)|obi]],
  Yoka kimon'.
In English
1. I will be here until Bon Festival,
  After Bon Festival, I will not be here.
  If Bon Festival comes earlier,
  I would return home earlier.
2. I am from the poor families,
  They are from the rich families.
  The rich people wear good belts,
  Wear good clothes.

=== Original version ===
In Japanese
1. Odoma iya iya,
  Naku ko no mori nya.
  Naku to iwarete uramareru,
  Naku to iwarete uramareru.
2. Nenne shita ko no
  Kawaii sa, muzo sa.
  Okite naku ko no tsura niku sa.
  Okite naku ko no tsura niku sa.
In English
1. I certainly hate
  Taking care of the crying child.
  They hate me for keeping the child to cry,
  They hate me for keeping the child to cry.
2. The sleeping child's
  Cuteness and Innocent look!
  The crying child's ugly look,
  The crying child's ugly look.

== Origin ==
The lullaby was rediscovered by a school teacher in 1935, long after the song ceased to be sung.

It has long been believed that this song was sung by babysitters from poor families. Itsuki was next to Gokanosho, where the Heike people came to settle after their defeat in the Genji-Heike War in the Heian period and later the Kamakura shogunate sent their Genji samurai families to watch over them, thus creating the rich Genji families and poorer Heike families.

== See also ==
- Lullaby
- Folk song
- Itsuki Village, Kuma District, Kumamoto Prefecture, Kyūshū Island, Japan
- Other Japanese lullabies: Edo Lullaby, Takeda Lullaby, Chugoku Region Lullaby, Shimabara Lullaby, etc.
