= Peggy Hayama =

Japanese singer

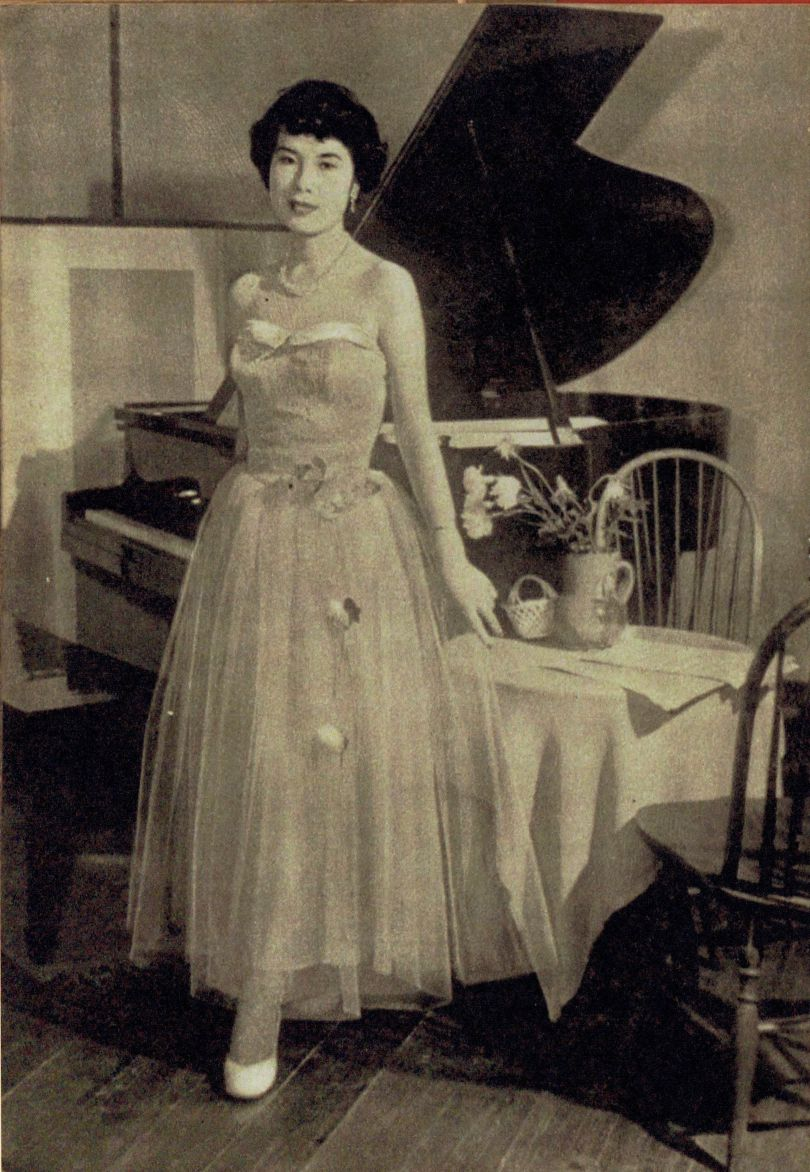
- Hayama in 1952

Background information
- Born: Shigeko Kotakari; 9 December 1933
- Died: April 12, 2017 (aged 83) Tokyo, Japan
- Genres: Jazz
- Occupation: Singer
- Spouse: Jun Negami (m. 1965)

Peggy Hayama (Japanese: ペギー葉山) born Shigeko Kotakari (Japanese: 小鷹狩 繁子; 9 December 1933 – 12 April 2017) was a Japanese singer.

Born Shigeko Kotakari in Yotsuya, Hayama attended Aoyama Gakuin Senior High School, where she was discovered while singing jazz. She debuted at the age of 18 in 1952, and two years later entered the Kohaku Uta Gassen for the first time. Hayama was known for singing the Japanese-language version of "Do-Re-Mi", a show tune from The Sound of Music later placed on the Nihon no Uta Hyakusen in 2007. She also lent her voice to Japanese dubs of Disney films and released a Japanese cover of "The Wedding" under its original title "La Novia". Hayama's famous Japanese songs included "Having Left Tosa", "School Days", and "Shimabara Lullaby". Her last performance was held in March 2017, at a memorial concert for Fubuki Koshiji.

Hayama was honored by the Ministry of Education in 1993 for her contributions to fine arts in Japan. Two years later, she received the Medal with Purple Ribbon. In 2004, Hayama was awarded an Order of the Rising Sun, fourth class. She became the first chairwoman of the Japanese Singers Association in 2007, and served until 2010.

Hayama was married to Jun Negami from 1965 until his death in 2005. She died at the age of 83 in 2017, after being hospitalized in Tokyo due to pneumonia.

== Kōhaku Uta Gassen Appearances ==
Year	#	Song	No.	VS	Remarks
1954 (Showa 29)/5th	1	Gekko No Chapel (月光のチャペル)	9/15	Toshio Oida	
1955 (Showa 30)/6th	2	Mambo Italiano (マンボ・イタリアーノ)	7/16	Toshio Oida (2)	
1956 (Showa 31)/7th	3	Que Sera Sera (ケ・セラ・セラ)	13/25	Hideo Yamagata	
1957 (Showa 32)/8th	4	Chante Chante (シャンテ・シャンテ)	21/25	Teruo Hata	
1958 (Showa 33)/9th	5	Toshigorodesu Mono (年頃ですもの)	19/25	Toshio Oida (3)	
1959 (Showa 34)/10th	6	Nangokutosa Wo Atonishite (南国土佐を後にして)	12/25	Frank Nagai	
1960 (Showa 35)/11th	7	Mamma (マンマ)	25/27	Frankie Sakai	
1961 (Showa 36)/12th	8	Brillat (ブリア)	12/25	Frank Nagai (2)	
1962 (Showa 37)/13th	9	Tonight (トゥナイト)	20/25	Joji Ai	
1963 (Showa 38)/14th	10	Onna Ni Umarete Shiawase (女に生れて幸せ)	21/25	Teruo Hata (2)	
1964 (Showa 39)/15th	11	La Novia (ラ・ノビア)	15/25	Frank Nagai (3)	
1965 (Showa 40)/16th	12	Gakusei Jidai (学生時代)	18/25	Bonny Jacks	
1966 (Showa 41)/17th	-	Red Team Emcee			
1968 (Showa 43)/19th	13	Ai No Hana Saku Toki (愛の花咲くとき)	3/23	Masao Sen	Returned after 3 years
1989 (Heisei 1)/40th	14	Nangokutosa Wo Atonishite (2)	-	-	Returned after 21 years

- 1966 didn't chosen as participating singer due to NHK policies to let emcees focus as emcee. (Same as 1967 to Yumiko Kokonoe)
- 1967 dismissed due to pregnancy.
- 1989 appeared as 4th singer in 7 singers of red team in 1st part, because this time's 1st part is not counted as duel, so singers in 1st part didn't versus with anybody. (4th singer in white team is The Tigers.)
