= Pacifier-activated lullaby =

PAL: Pacifier Activated Lullaby is a pacifier fitted with an adapter, which houses a computer chip that activates a CD player outside the incubator. Developed in 2000 by Dr. Jayne M. Standley along with the Center for Music Research at Florida State University, the PAL is used during music therapy interventions in the neonatal intensive-care unit to promote and reinforce non-nutritive sucking (NNS) opportunities on premature infants. Dr. Standley found that infants could differentiate between silence and musical stimuli, which meant infants could be positively reinforced with music when they sucked with enough endurance and strength.

The sensors in the PAL detect correct non-nutritive sucking characteristics and activate a CD player which reproduces lullabies through small speakers placed binaurally in the incubator above the infant's head.

In October 2022, NeoLight acquired the Pacifier Activated Lullaby System from Powers Medical Inc.

== Music protocol ==
Lullabies are selected for this intervention by credentialed music therapists following these basic criteria:

- no changes in tempo
- no changes in volume level (65db scale C)
- no key changes
- higher vocal ranges (mainly female vocals)
- the native language of the infant to promote language input opportunities

The music is sustained for 10 seconds after receiving the first suck, and fades out if it is not reactivated by another one, therefore making the presentation of musical stimuli contingent on the sucking behavior of the infant. Provisions are made in the protocol to discontinue the intervention if signs of infant distress are observed.

== Studies ==
Studies have shown that contingent music, such as pacifier activated lullabies, increased pacifier sucking rate of premature infants more than 2.5 times (Standley 2000), and that they have also increased subsequent feeding rates. Recent research observed that a PAL intervention can significantly reduce gavage feeding days and the length of hospitalization for premature infants when used at the specific gestation age of 34 weeks. Some criteria for referral are:

- Infant has been determined to tolerate two simultaneous modes of stimulation.
- Infant has no severe abnormalities that affect ability to suck/feed or to learn.
- Infant has no indication of infection requiring quarantine.
