= The Dream Passes by the Windows =

"Ой ходить сон коло вікон"

Song
- Language: Ukrainian
- English title: "Dream Passes by the Windows"
- Released: 1929
- Genre: Lullaby
- Songwriter: Alexander Koshetz (arranging)

"Oy Khodyt Son Kolo Vikon" – Kate Orange

"Dream Passes by the Windows" (Ukrainian: Ой ходить сон коло вікон, romanized: Oi khodyt son kolo vikon), is a Ukrainian lullaby.

The song is a traditional lullaby for young children, composed of three verses in a minor key. As a folk song, there are many popular versions of both the lyrics and the melody. The first recordings of the lyrics were made in the 19th century. In particular, in the almanac Mermaid of the Dniester in 1837 on page 35, it is marked as "lelial". On page 65 of Nikolai Gatsuk's collection Harvest of the Native Field, published in Moscow in 1857.

== Lyrics ==
Ой ходить сон, коло вікон.
А дрімота коло плота.
Питається сон дрімоти:
“Де ж ми будем ночувати?”

Де хатонька теплесенька,
Де дитина малесенька,
Туди підем ночувати,
І дитинку колисати.

Там ми будем спочивати,
І дитинку присипляти:
Спати, спати, соколятко,
Спати, спати, голуб’ятко.

Transliteration
Oy khodyt' son, kolo vikon.
A drimota kolo plota.
Pytayetsya son drimoty:
"De zh my budem nochuvaty?"

De khaton'ka teplesen'ka,
De dytynka malesen'ka,
Tudy pidem nochuvaty
I dytynku kolysaty.

Tam budem spochyvaty,
I dytynku prysypl'yaty:
Spaty, spaty, sokol'yatko,
Spaty, spaty, holubyatko.

Dream passes by the windows,
And sleepiness by the fence.
The dream asks sleep:
"Where should we stay the night?"

Where the cottage is warm,
Where the tot is tiny,
There we will go and stay the night
And rock the little child.

There we will sleep,
and will sing to the child:
Sleep, sleep, my little falcon,
Sleep, sleep, my little dove.

== Possible "Summertime" connection ==
When, after a performance, the Ukrainian-Canadian composer and singer Alexis Kochan was asked about the similarity of (the first line of) this lullaby and the melody of George Gershwin's aria "Summertime" (composed in December 1933), Kochan suggested that "Gershwin was deeply affected by the Ukrainian lullaby when he heard it sung by the Koshetz Ukrainian National Choir at Carnegie Hall in 1929 [1926?]."
