= List of Bulgarian classical composers =

The following is a list of Bulgarian classical composers.

== Romantic ==
- Emanuil Manolov (1860–1902)

== Modern/Contemporary ==
- Dobri Hristov (1875–1941)
- Petko Staynov (1896–1977)
- Pancho Vladigerov (1899–1978)
- Dimitar Nenov (1901–1953)
- Veselin Stoyanov (1902–1969)
- Marin Goleminov (1908–2000)
- Georgi Tutev (1924–1994)
- Tsvetan Tsvetanov (1931-1982)
- Dimiter Hristov (1933–2017)
- Petar Krumov (1934-2021)
- Vassil Kazandjiev (1934–2026)
- Milcho Leviev (1937–2019)
- Emil Tabakov (born 1947)
- Julia Tsenova (1948–2010)
- Michail Goleminov (1956-2022)
- Georgi Arnaoudov (born 1957)
- Anna-Maria Ravnopolska-Dean (born 1960)
- Albena Petrovic-Vratchanska (born 1965)
- Dobrinka Tabakova (born 1980)
- Alexandra Fol (born 1981)
- Heraclit Nestorov (1896-1940)
