= Tambu (music) =

Drum, dance form and music genre

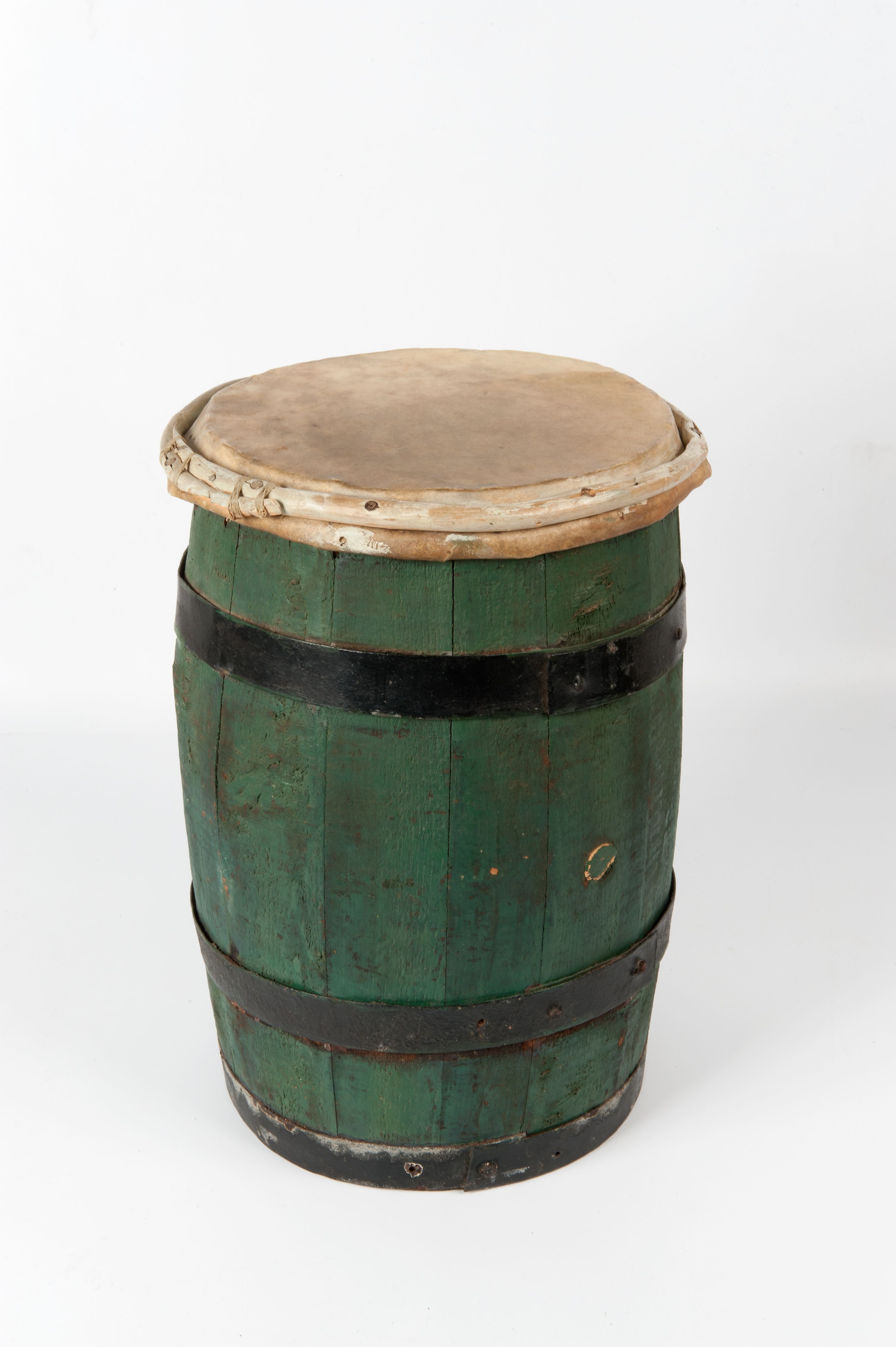
- Traditional Tambu drum
- Native name: ntambu (West-Kongo)
- Etymology: tambor (Spanish)
- Other names: Bari
- Cultural origins: 16th Century Africa
- Typical instruments: Chapi • Bari

Fusion genres
- Afro-Cuban Jazz • Tumba

Local scenes
- Curacao • Bonaire • Aruba

Other topics
- Music of Curaçao • Music of the former Netherlands Antilles

Tambu (also tambú) is a drum, music genre and dance form, found on Aruba, Bonaire and Curaçao, and is a major part of the Dutch Antillean music. On Bonaire, it is also known as bari. Curaçaoan tambu is a major part of that island's culture, and is there a genre that is considered muziek di zumbi (literally, spirit music, referring to music of African origin), and is accompanied by instruments like the wiri, agan and triangle. The word tambu derives from the Spanish word for drum, tambor.

The origins of Tambú can be traced back to the early 17th century, where a large number of African slaves arrived in Curaçao from Angola. The ritual was first associated with the Curaçao style of stick fighting called kokomakaku, where the Tambú referred to the rhythms played by the drummer (called a tamburero) on a single drum (also referred to as tambú). Since then, the performance has changed in congruence with the historical circumstances of the Curaçao island.

Tambu can refer to the small drum on which the music is played, the dance that accompanies the music, or the event where the music and dance take place. In modern tambu, the lyrics are usually in the Papiamento language and are sung along with a chapi (hoe), the tambu drum and sometimes other singers, while the audience claps to the rhythm. The tambu rhythm is complicated and is passed down orally from generation to generation. Tambu consists of two beats; sla habri and sla será, the open and closed beat respectively. These beats alternate to create a musical dialogue. The lead vocalists are known for their skilful wordplay when delivering the performance's message. Additionally, there are two types of tambu music; telele, which is a long, slow rising and falling melody, and tambu itself, which is faster paced and shorter in duration.

== History ==
=== The Slavery Era ===
Tambú first emerged on Curaçao in the early stages of Dutch slave rule during the early 17th century. It is a tradition which was started by the large number of African slaves sent to Curaçao from Angola. The slaves acted as servants for Dutch families who resided there. During these years, the Afro-community continued to express Angolan culture through the performance of war dances, in particular, stick fighting known as kokomakaku. Originally performed in a circle, the first form of Tambú music was used to complement the stick fighters, in which the contestants danced and jumped to the rhythms played by the drummer on a single drum called the tambú. The drummer was accompanied by a lead vocalist, who sang tributes about the contestants before they began fighting, in which the audience could gain an understanding about the fighters past history and special talents.

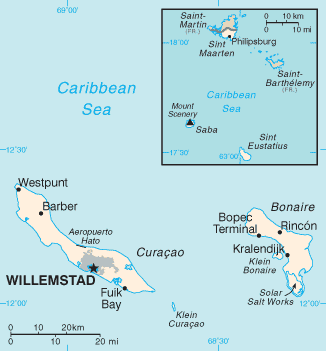
Map of the former Netherlands Antilles

Tambú further evolved as the Dutch became more conscious of the growing slave communities and set out to control them. Stick fighting and other general martial arts traditions became restricted by law, and the traditional kokomakuku performance became extinct. Instead the tradition transformed into a performance more focused on the drumming and wordplay. The use of sticks as weapons, were instead replaced with words, spoken by the lead vocalist, who were used by people to attack another person's defects and vice versa. The ritual finished with the audience making a judgement on who had the better performance and awarded the winner.

=== Post Slavery Era ===
In the years preceding emancipation, the Catholic Church and their methods of indoctrination were used to further attempt to end Tambú rituals. However, the subsequent Afro-Curaçao Catholic community instead adopted catholic principles and saints into Tambu performances. Following the abolishment of slavery in 1863, the Catholic Church stepped up their efforts to end Tambú rituals. Priests used weekly pulpits to convince the community that Tambú was evil, and participation in the genre would have everlasting implications on their journey to heaven. Religious disapproval did have an effect on the Afro-Curaçao community, however participation still continued. Participants instead performed more secular versions of songs in a manner more socially acceptable in Curaçao society.

=== 20th Century to Present Day ===
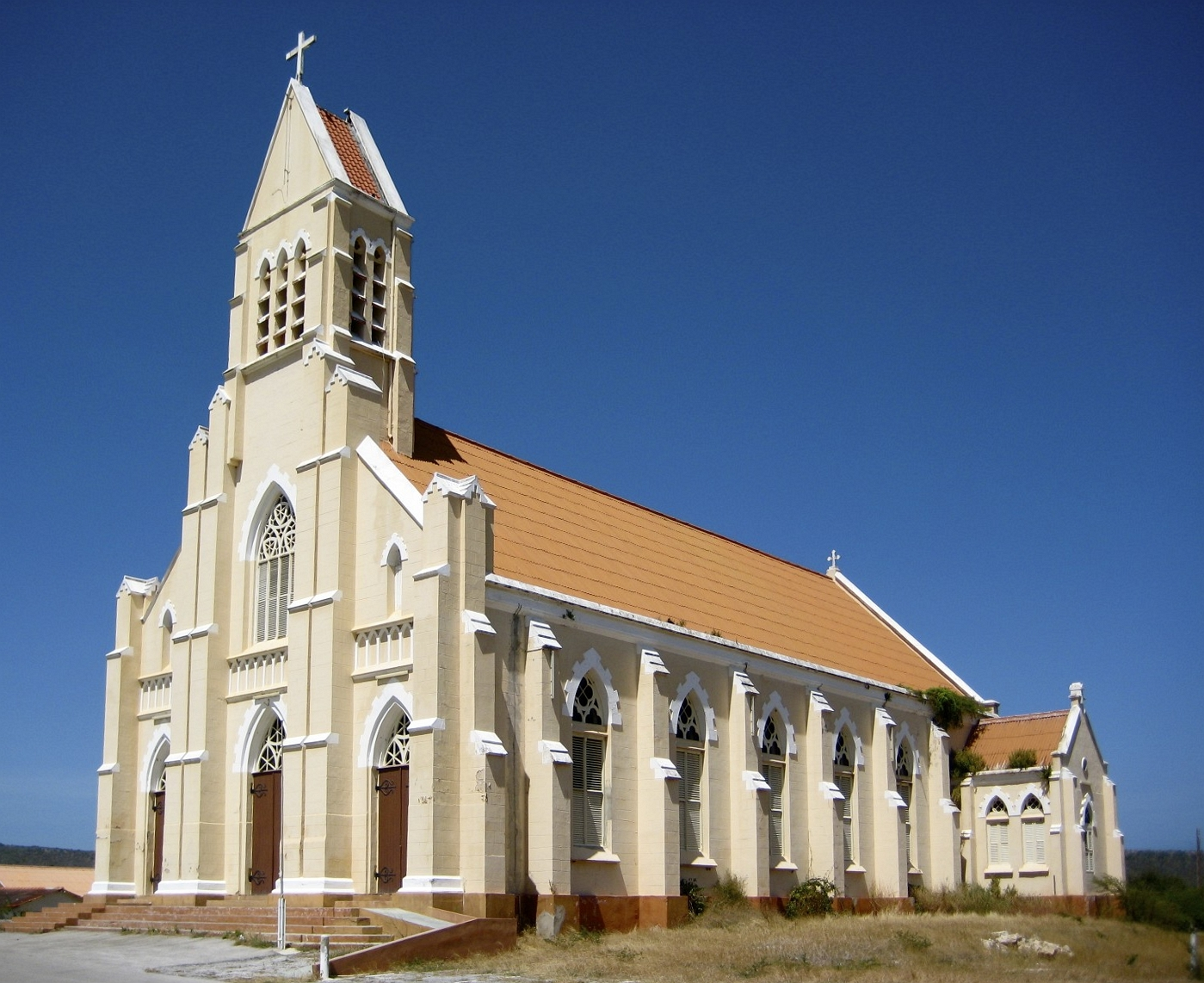
The Catholic Church in Curacao had a major impact on Tambu's history

During the 20th Century, the government further created laws to limit the participation of Tambú. These laws are still in effect in Curaçao society. Instead of trying to eliminate Tambú completely, the government enforced a law in 1935, where organisers had to apply for a permit to hold Tambú events. The application had to specify exact dates, which songs would be played, and the name of all attendees. Furthermore, the law stated that a second permit was needed to allow people of two or more from separate residences to dance together. This pushed Tambú further underground. Many participants found the laws too risky to flout, forcing them to disengage with Tambú.

During the 1970s, Tambú experienced a revival, when a group of Afro-Curaçaon scholars endeavoured to persuade the Curaçao government to rethink the laws restricting Tambú. Their efforts gained a following which resulted in the government and the Catholic Church to ease restrictions. Laws were relaxed during certain months of the year (November, December and January), which is now known as 'The Tambú Season'.

In contemporary Curaçao society, Tambú continues to be performed in an effort to preserve its historical significance. Special cultural events are organised during the Tambú Season to promote and represent African and Afro-Curaçao history. Tambú recordings are also played on media platforms such as the radio, and in local party scenes, becoming increasingly popular to the younger generations of contemporary Curaçao society.

== Instrumentation ==
=== Tambú (drum) ===
An essential element of the Tambú is the single drum which is played during a performance, called the tambú or bari (translated to barrel). The original instrument in Tambú's early years was made out of a hollow tree trunk, its opening covered with animal skin. During the early 17th century the drum took different forms of shapes, in conjunction with the restrictions. As the performance became more secretive in different locations, lighter smaller drums were used, as well as household items such as tables and chairs. Another alternative drum used was known as the kalbas den tobo (“calabash in a tub”), which was made using wooden wash tubs filled with water and a large calabash floating on top. This produced a muffled, quiet sound that allowed Tambú to be performed indistinctly. New types of drums continued to appear in Curaçao. Due to the negative environmental implications of Dutch settlement, trees became less populated on the island. The main type of bari was made from the wood of old vegetable boxes, melded into a cylinder, with sheep skin stretched over the top. This technique is used to construct the drum in modern Curaçao society.

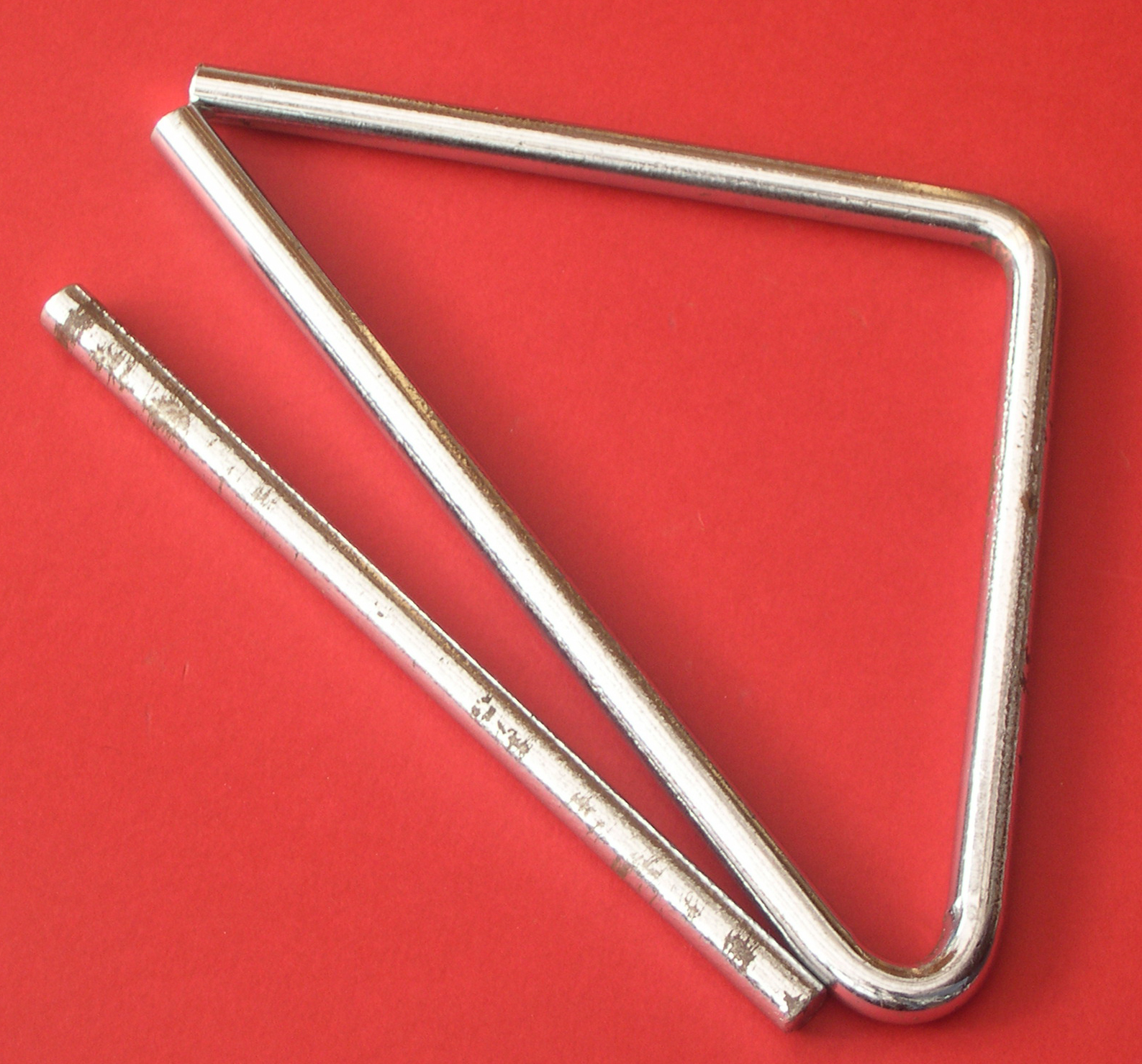
Modern triangle instrument

=== Heru ===
Accompanying the bari, there is a collective of iron instruments known as heru. There have been five basic types of heru known as the:

- Agan di tres pida (“iron in three pieces”), which was made up of two iron bars and one iron tube, in which the player produces different tone variations, depending on where the bars were hit;
- Agan di dos pida (“iron in two pieces”), which was made up of one iron bar and one tube, and played the same way as the agan di tres pida;
- Triangel, where an iron bar was bent into the shape of a triangle, and struck with an iron bar to create a singular clear tone;
- Wiri, which is a serrated piece of iron that is scraped down using a thin iron bar;
- Chapi, which is the metal end of a garden hoe and is struck with an iron bar to achieve a sharp high-pitched tone.

The chapi, was an instrument born from the slave years in Curaçao but remains the most common used heru in contemporary Tambú to this day.

== Music Structure ==
=== Deklarashon Introduktorio ===
The prequel of a Tambú performance is known as the deklarashon introduktorio. This is an announcement of sought, where the pregon (lead singer), declares that a Tambú performance is about to begin and gathers the audience around. It is here where the tonal centre of the song is established, and a feeling of the basic melodic and rhythmic elements can be listened to by the audience and the musicians in preparation for the performance. The pregon will also announce the title or basic outline of the Tambú performance to the audience. Once this concludes, the Tambú performance begins. Tambú has maintained the basic binary structure of the performance that follows since its origins and consists of two sections: the habri (“open”) and será (“closed”).

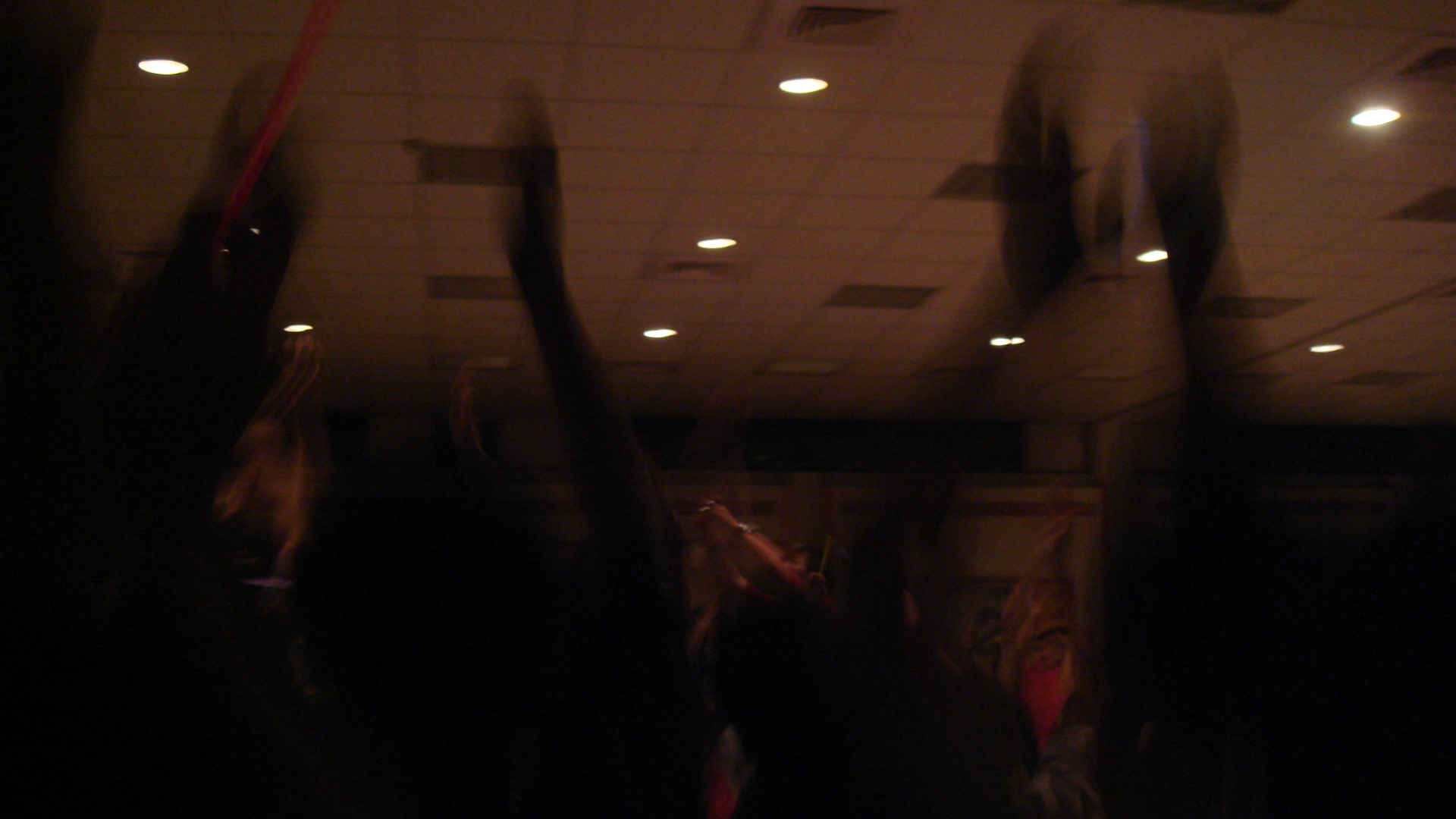
Clapping is an important rhythmic element in Tambu

=== Habri ===
Once the short deklarashon introduktorio concludes, the habri begins. The habri, is where the pregon conveys the main message of the performance. It is a customary rule that the audience and coro, remain silent during the habri. No dancing, clapping or other distractions are allowed, and the audience is expected to be paying undivided attention to the pregon. The pregon also must adhere to the melodic and rhythmic patterns set in the deklarashon introduktorio.

=== Sera ===
Following the habri the pregon will decide when the sera begins. The pregon will signal with a hand wave and a vocal call, that the sera has begun. In this part, the rhythms of the tambu and the heru become faster and more intense. The coro is used to support the pregon by repeating key messages of the song, and pushing the pregon to continue delivering the performance. The audience also plays a key role during the sera. In this section, the audience are free to participate through clapping (called brassa) or stomping (called pisotea). Hand clapping is used to accentuate the downbeat of the performance, adding further rhythmic elements to accompany the percussionists. Rhythmically, the combination of the heru, bari, and body percussion of the audience, produces quick and complex patterns. Often the heru and bari, provide a triplet pulse, transcribed as a 12/8 time signature, while the pregon sings to a 4/4 count. The hand claps are able to adopt both sets of rhythms to accompany both the musicians and the pregon. The sera section also allows the audience to dance. Dancing is typically done where the participant plants one foot on the floor, while the other foot stomps to the drummers rhythm. Dancing is governed by strict rules of etiquette. It can be danced either individually or in pairs, however it is forbidden for an individual to touch their partner when dancing together.

== Bibliography ==
- Garland Encyclopedia of World Music, pp. 927–931
- New Grove Encyclopedia of Music, pp 775–777.
- Rosalia, René Vicente, Tambu : de legale en kerkelijke repressie van Afro-Curaçaose volksuitingen. Studie over tambú op Curaçao, de Antilliaanse muziek, dans, cultuur en geschiedenis, Zutphen, the Netherlands: Walburg Pers, 1997, ISBN 9789060119877, 337 pages. In Dutch.
