= Georgi Tutev =

Bulgarian composer (1924–1994)

Georgi Tutev (Bulgarian: Георги Тутев; 23 August 1924 – 13 September 1994) was a Bulgarian composer of contemporary classical music, one of the main representative of Bulgarian modernism.

== Life ==
He was the son of a Bulgarian father and German mother. He studied law at the "Climent Ohridski" Sofia University and music with Lubomir Pipkov, as well as composition in the Moscow State Conservatory with Yuri Shaporin and Viktor Bely.

Tutev is the founder and the first president of the SCMB - ISCM Bulgarian Section as well as the founder and organizer of the Musica Nova - Sofia, International Festival of Contemporary Music.

== Works ==
- Tale of the Lopian Forest (1951)
- Symphony No. 1 for orchestra (1959)
- Overtura da Requiem for orchestra (1963)
- Metamorphoses for 13 Strings (1966)
- Tempi Rithmizati for strings, piano and percussion (1968)
- Musica Concertante for strings, flute, cembalo and percussion (1968)
- Symphony No. 2 (Variationen) (1969–72)
- "Soli per tre" for wind trio (1974)
- Musica peritos in la Glorificat auf Themen unbekannter Meister der Renaissance (1975)
- Sehnsucht nach der vorlengegangenen Harmonie - Concertante Musik for large String orch, kaval, keyboards and percussion (1979–82)
- Calvinomusica for cello and chamber ensemble (1987)
- J.S.B. Mediationen for chamber ensemble (1992)
