= Edo Lullaby =

Traditional Japanese cradle song

Melody

Edo Lullaby (Japanese: 江戸子守唄, Edo no komori uta) is a traditional Japanese cradle song. It originated in Edo, was propagated to other areas, and is said to be the roots of the Japanese lullabies.

It was one of the themes used by the English composer Gustav Holst in his work Japanese Suite Op. 33 composed in 1915. The themes were provided to the composer by the Japanese dancer Michio Itō.

== Lyrics ==
=== Japanese ===
ねんねんころりよ おころりよ。
ぼうやはよい子だ ねんねんしな。

ぼうやのお守りは どこへ行った。
あの山こえて 里へ行った。

里のみやげに 何もろうた。
でんでん太鼓に 笙の笛。

=== Romanized Japanese ===
nen, nen korori yo, okorori yo.
bōya wa yoi koda, nenneshina~

bōya no omori wa, doko e itta?
ano yama koete, sato e itta.

sato no miyage ni, nani morōta?
denden taiko ni, shō no fue.

=== English translation ===
Hush-a-bye, hush-a-bye!
My good baby, sleep!

Where did my boy's babysitter go?
Beyond that mountain, back to her home.

As a souvenir from her home, what did you get?
A toy drum and a shō flute.

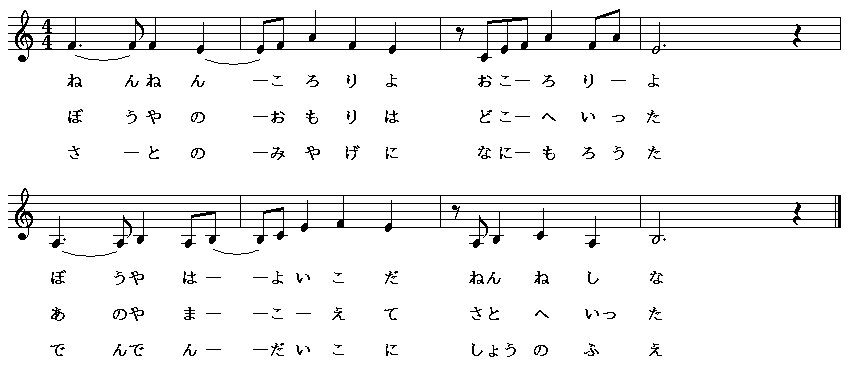
Gustav Holst drew upon Edo Lullaby for Dance Under the Cherry Tree in his Japanese Suite.

== See also ==
- Lullaby
- Folk song
- Other Japanese lullabies: Itsuki Lullaby, Takeda Lullaby, Chūgoku Region Lullaby, etc.
