= Chūgoku Region Lullaby =

Chugoku Region Lullaby (Japanese: 中国地方の子守唄 or chūgoku chihō no komoriuta) is a traditional folk song in Okayama Prefecture, Chugoku region, Japan, and is a well known Japanese cradle song.

== General ==
The song is best known by the arrangement by Kosaku Yamada that was made in 1938. An instrumental version, played on a harp, historically marked the end of transmission at night on RCC, broadcasting to Hiroshima Prefecture. Up until 1987, a violin version was used on Sanyo Broadcasting, in Okayama and Kagawa, also signalling the end of daily programming. During the shutdown of analog television in Japan on 24 July 2011, RCC played the song for the final time on the station's analog signal shortly before the station switched off its analog transmitters.

== Lyrics ==
=== Japanese ===
ねんねこ しゃっしゃりませ
寝た子の 可愛さ
起きて 泣く子の
ねんころろ つらにくさ
ねんころろん ねんころろん

ねんねこ しゃっしゃりませ
きょうは 二十五日さ
あすは この子の
ねんころろ 宮詣り
ねんころろん ねんころろん

宮へ 詣った時
なんと言うて 拝むさ
一生 この子の
ねんころろ まめなように
ねんころろん ねんころろん

=== Romanized Japanese ===
Nenneko shasshari mase,
Neta ko no kawaisa.
Okite naku ko no
Nenkororo, tsura nikusa.
Nenkororon, nenkororon.

Nenneko shasshari mase,
Kyō wa nijūgo-nichi sa.
Asu wa kono ko no,
Nenkororo, Miya-mairi.
Nenkororon, nenkororon.

Miya e maitta toki,
Nan to yūte ogamu sa.
Issho kono ko no,
Nenkororo, mame na yō ni.
Nenkororon, nenkororon.

=== English translation ===
Hushabye, sleep!
How cute is the face of the baby fallen asleep,
The baby who is awake and cries,
Hushabye, how hateful his face looks!
Hushabye!

Hushabye, sleep!
Today is the 25th day of his birth.
Tomorrow we will go,
Hushabye, to the shrine,
Hushabye!

Arriving at the shrine,
what will you pray for?
Through his life, may he be,
Hushabye, healthy!
Hushabye!

== See also ==
- Lullaby
- Folk song
- Other Japanese lullabies: Edo Lullaby, Itsuki Lullaby, Takeda Lullaby, etc.
