= Rudolph Palm =

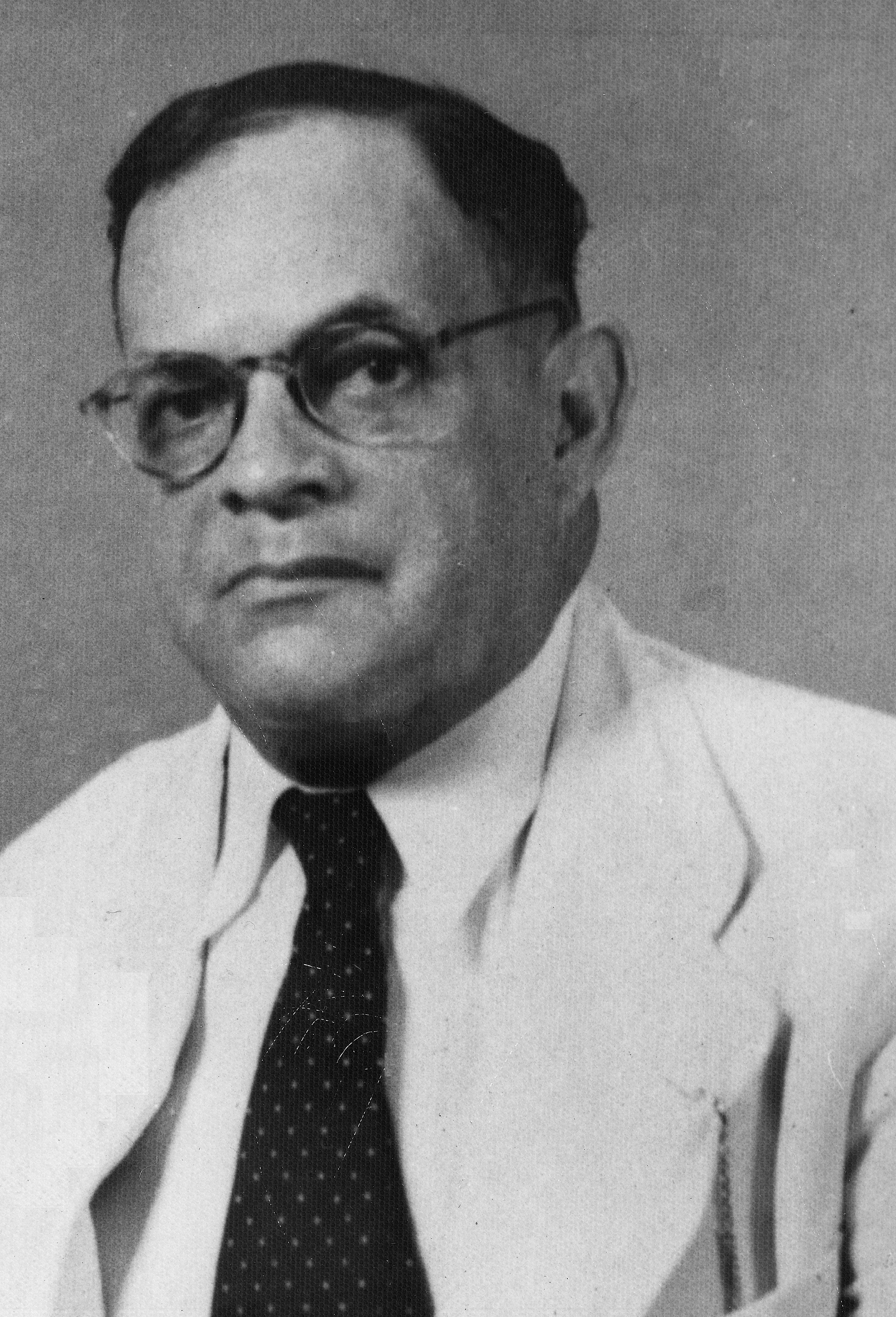
Rudolf Palm

Rudolf Palm (11 January 1880 in Curaçao – 11 September 1950 in Curaçao) was a Curaçao born composer.

== Biography ==
Rudolf Theodorus Palm was the grandson of Jan Gerard Palm (1831–1906) who is often referred to as the "father of Curaçao classical music". Like his cousin Jacobo Palm and his brother John Palm, at the age of seven Rudolf started to take lessons in music from his grandfather. Rudolf played several musical instruments such as piano, organ, saxophone, clarinet and flute.

At the age of 19 Palm was appointed music director of the citizen's guard orchestra in Curaçao. As an organist, Palm played for many years in the Jewish synagogue Emanu-El (1911–1950) and Mikvé Israel (1926–1928), the Protestant Fort Church (1902–1946) and the Lodge Igualdad (1903–1950) in Curaçao. Rudolf Palm also founded in 1901 his own music ensemble "Los Dispuestos", an orchestra consisting of about 20 musicians and some years later a sextet, called "Los seis". Rudolf Palm also played flute in the Curaçao Philharmonic Orchestra.

Numerous students followed lessons in music from Rudolf Palm. His most talented students were his own sons the composers Albert Palm (1903–1958) and Edgar Palm (1905–1998) and his daughter Maria Henskes-Palm (1909–1979).

== Compositions ==
As a composer, Rudolf Palm wrote about 90 pieces for piano, consisting of 61 waltzes, 8 marches, 5 danzas, 8 tumbas, 2 mazurkas, 1 polka, 4 danzons, 1 paso doble and also the music for some songs. Several of his compositions were recorded on LP and later also on CD.
