= Wim Statius Muller =

Curaçaon composer and pianist (1930–2019)

Wim Statius Muller (Curaçao, 26 January 1930 – Curaçao, 1 September 2019) was a Curaçaoan composer and pianist, nicknamed "Curaçao's Chopin" for his romantic piano style of composition. While he was a Juilliard graduate, his musical career did not begin in earnest until after he retired from a career in security and counterintelligence.

== Career ==
Statius Muller was born in 1930 on Curaçao, in Willemstad's Otrabanda district. He began piano lessons at age seven with Jacobo Palm. He received a thorough musical education, entering the Juilliard School of Music in New York City in 1949, where he studied piano and composition with Josef Raieff (the last pupil of Alexander Siloti).

Statius Muller received his degree in 1954, and in 1955 began teaching piano and music history at Ohio State University in Columbus, Ohio. In 1960, Statius Muller left his position at the University to accept a job as a civil servant, initially in Willemstad, Curaçao, where he collaborated on the creation of a security service. In 1972, Statius Muller relocated to the Netherlands, later describing his move as follows:

"This was in the days of the Cold War and I had been appointed to head a team of academics in the Dutch Counterintelligence Service that analyzed the policies of the various communist countries. Our job was to slip into the skin of the opponents’ ideologies and figure out their intentions."

Statius Muller worked for a long time in a management position at the Domestic Security Service ("BVD") in The Hague, and then at NATO headquarters in Brussels.

After his retirement in 1995, Statius Muller returned to Curaçao, where he had more time for the piano.

Statius Muller performed regularly in the Netherlands Antilles, and occasionally in the Netherlands, the United States, and Poland.

Statius Muller had two children, a daughter, Annette, and a son, John. His grandson, Alexander Kraft van Ermel, has followed his footsteps as a pianist.

== Work ==
Statius Muller was a student of Jacobo Palm, whose grandfather, Jan Gerard Palm, popularized salon music and Caribbean dance music in classical form. Frédéric Chopin's mazurkas and waltzes that were often performed in Curaçao also influenced his work.

Statius Muller composed dances for piano: waltzes, mazurkas, and Caribbean dances, such as the tumba, which derived from Congolese music. Tropical, syncopated rhythms are apparent in nearly all his works.

Many of Statius Muller's over two-hundred compositions remain unpublished. One well-known published work is the Antillean Dances for piano (opus 2, 4, 5, and 6). In 2024 a second volume of Antillean Dances was published posthumously.

== Documentary and awards ==
A 2013 documentary about Statius Muller was created by filmmaker Alaric Alexander Smeets. Nostalgia:The Music of Wim Statius Muller is titled after one of Statius Muller's most famous works.

In 2012, Statius Muller was awarded a Silver Carnation by Queen Beatrix for his contribution to the preservation of the musical heritage of the Caribbean Islands, in particular, the classical music of Curaçao. Statius Muller was praised as a mentor and inspiration to young musicians in the Caribbean part of the Kingdom.

Statius Muller was invested as a Knight of the Order of Orange-Nassau.

== Discography ==
In 1994, Wim Statius Muller recorded a CD as a pianist, performing his own compositions, Antillean Dances Opus 4, on René Gailly CD87018. He has also recorded the CD Antillean Treasures on the Bruno Klassiek label.
