= John Palm =

Curaçao composer (1885–1925)

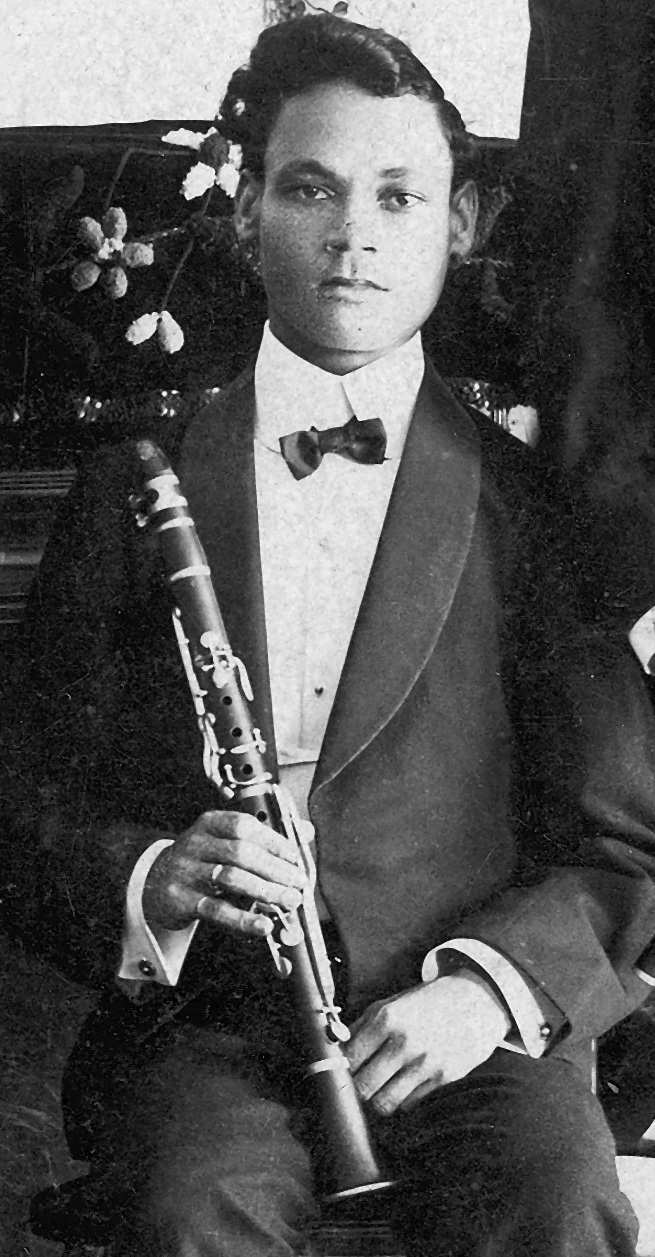

John Palm (13 June 1885 – 24 February 1925) was a Curaçao-born composer.

== Biography ==
Johan Antoine Palm—better known as John Palm—was a grandson of Jan Gerard Palm (1831-1906), who is often referred to as the "father of Curaçao classical music". Like his cousin Jacobo Palm and his brother Rudolph Palm, John started at music lessons from his grandfather at a young age.

Palm played several musical instruments such as piano, clarinet and flute. He joined some orchestras such as "Los Dispuestos" and a sextet "Los seis". With his favorite instrument the clarinet, John Palm gave many clarinet solos. Like Frederique Chopin, John died at the relatively young age of 39 due to tuberculosis, in Curaçao.

== Compositions ==
As a composer Palm wrote waltzes including "La Belleza", "Club X", "Emma", "La Veloce"" "Ma Pensee", "Gozar sufriendo" and "Nocturno."
