= List of composers in the Mannheim school =

List of composers

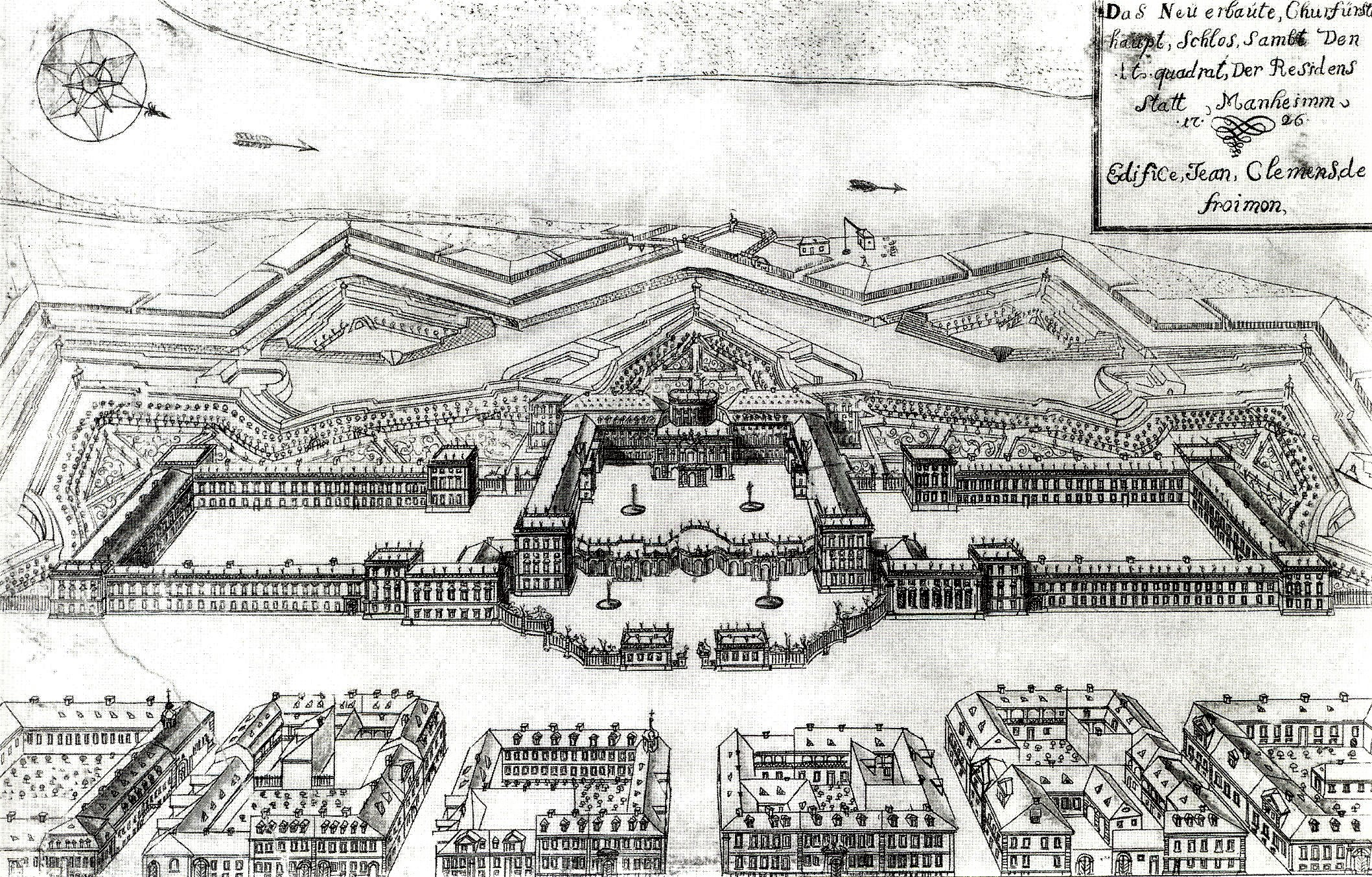
The Mannheim Palace, c. 1725

The Mannheim school of composers was one of the most prominent musical groups of the 18th century. With a revolutionary court orchestra created by the Elector Palatinate of Mannheim, the Mannheim court inspired many famous musicians such as Haydn and Mozart. This is a list of composers usually associated with the Mannheim school.

== List ==
=== First generation (born 1700–1730) ===
Name	Year born	Year died	Works/comments	Portrait
Carlo Grua	1700	1773	2 surviving operas and sacred works, including many oratorios. He is best known for his position as Kapellmeister of the Mannheim orchestra.	
Franz Xaver Richter	1709	1789	80 extant symphonies, several concertos for soloist and orchestra, and 39 masses. He was the prime sacred music composer of his time.	Franz Xaver Richter
Ignaz Holzbauer	1711	1783	196 symphonies. He was a prime exponent of the Sturm und Drang style.	
Johann Stamitz	1717	1757	58 symphonies, 10 orchestral trios (symphonies for string orchestra), many concertos, most famously his one for clarinet, and 8 vocal works. He was the first to expand the symphony's instrumentation and longevity. For this, he is known as being a founding father of the school.	Johann Stamitz
Johann Baptist Wendling	1723	1797	14 flute concertos, 30 trios for flute, violin, and cello, 36 flute duets, and other works relating to the flute. He was one of the greatest flute virtuosos.	

=== Second generation (born after 1730) ===
Name	Year born	Year died	Works/comments	Portrait
Christian Cannabich	1731	1798	76 symphonies, 30 sonatas for violin and piano, and several concertos and trios. He is known for being Stamitz's successor and bringing the Mannheim orchestra to its zenith. He was a friend of Mozart and directly influenced the symphonies of Haydn and Leopold Hofmann.	Christian Cannabich
Anton Fils	1733	1760	34 surviving symphonies and several concertos, mostly for cello and flute. He, although very overshadowed today, was an eminent cellist and composer in the Mannheim court.	
Franz Ignaz Beck	1734	1809	24 symphonies, a few operas, and miscellaneous pieces for keyboard. He spent most of his time in France, apparently after a duel which caused him to leave Mannheim.	Franz Ignaz Beck
Ignaz Fränzl	1736	1811	2 symphonies, 6 violin concertos, and several string quartets. He was heavily praised by Mozart, mostly for his violin technique.	Ignaz Fränzl
Carl Stamitz	1745	1801	50 symphonies, 38 surviving sinfonia concertante, and more than 60 concertos for various instruments. He, along with Cannabich, was a stand-out representative of the Mannheim school.	Carl Stamitz
Wilhelm Cramer	1746	1799	6 violin concertos and 23 violin sonatas, distributed in various opus numbers. He was the father of the more famous Johann Baptist Cramer, a virtuosic English pianist.	Wilhelm Cramer
Georg Joseph Vogler	1749	1814	8 surviving masses, 4 string quartets, and a few operas. He also received patronage from Gustav III of Sweden and Louis I, Grand Duke of Hesse. His travels extended as far as remote areas of Asia and Africa, and even Greenland.	Georg Joseph Vogler
Anton Stamitz	1750	1809	15 symphonies distributed in four opus numbers and concertos for violin, flute, and viola d'amore. He, although not as well known as his father and brother, participated in the development of the Mannheim orchestra and was the violin teacher of Rodolphe Kreutzer.	
Ludwig August Lebrun	1752	1790	6 oboe concertos, a concerto for clarinet, and other woodwind pieces. He was a celebrated oboe virtuoso and toured extensively across Europe.	
Peter Winter	1754	1825	30 operas. He is regarded as a bridge between Mozart and Weber in the history of German opera.	Peter Winter
Francesca Lebrun	1756	1791	12 keyboard sonatas with violin accompaniment. She is more known as a soprano and had many relationships with other Mannheim musicians, such as L. A. Lebrun (her husband) and Franz Danzi (her brother).	Francesca Lebrun
Franz Tausch	1762	1817	2 clarinet concertos and 2 double clarinet concertos. He was the teacher of Heinrich Baermann.	
Franz Danzi	1763	1826	9 woodwind quintets in 3 opus numbers, 2 horn sonatas, and concertos for many instruments. He knew Mozart in his youth, studied with Vogler, was a contemporary of Beethoven, and a tutor to the young Weber. He was a key figure in the transition between the Classical era and the Romantic era.	Franz Danzi
