= Es kam ein Herr zum Schlößli =

Swiss and German folksong

Song
- Language: German
- English title: A knight came to the castle
- Published: not later than 1779
- Genre: Folk
- Songwriter(s): Traditional

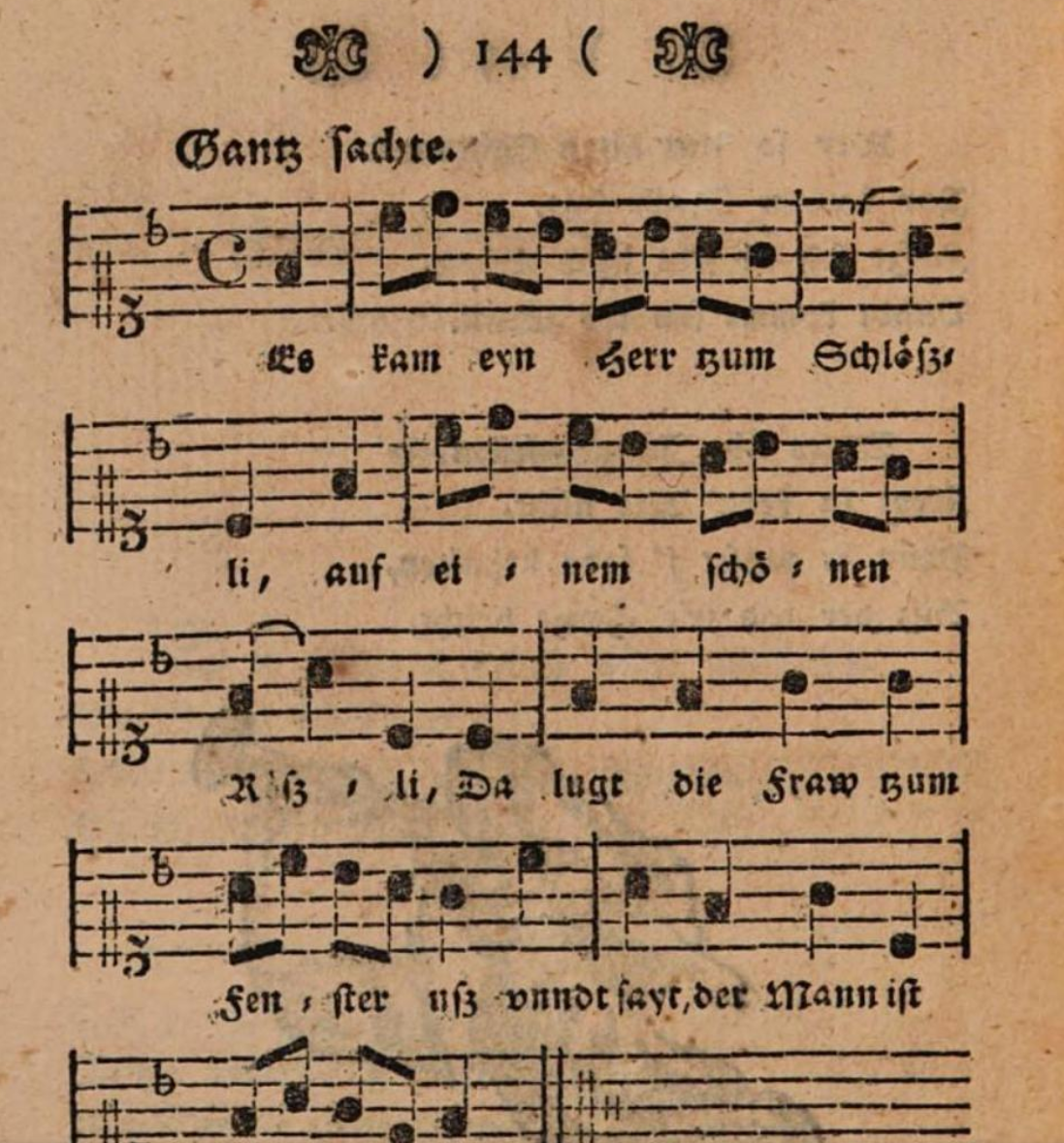
The melody and lyrics

"Es kam ein Herr zum Schlößi" (A knight came to the castle) is a cradle song from German and Swiss folklore.

== History ==
First published not later than 1778–1779, the song has been widespread throughout Switzerland as a lullaby. Under the title "Um die Kinder still und artig zu machen" (To make children quiet and well-behaved), it was included in the German folklore collection Des Knaben Wunderhorn (1806).

The tune with words in Swiss German was published by Johann Rudolf Wyss (1818).

== Words ==
Es kam ein Herr zum Schlößli
auf einem schönen Rößli.
Da lugt die Frau zum Fenster aus
und sagt: "Der Mann ist nicht zu Haus.

Und niemand heim als Kinder
und 's Mädchen auf der Winden."
Der Herr auf seinem Rößli,
sagt zu der Frau im Schlößli:

"Sind's gute Kind', sind's böse Kind'?
Ach, liebe Frau, ach sagt geschwind."
Die Frau, die sagt: "Sehr böse Kind',
sie folgen Muttern nicht geschwind."

Da sagt der Herr: "So reit' ich heim,
dergleichen Kinder brauch' ich kein'."
Und reit' auf seinem Rößli
weit, weit entweg vom Schlößli.

A lord came to the castle
on a beautiful horse.
There looked the woman out of the window
and said: "The husband is not at home.

And no one home but the children
and our maid in the attic."
The lord on his horse
said to the woman in the castle:

"Are they good children, are they bad children?
Ah, dear woman, tell me now!"
The woman, she said: "Very bad children,
they don't obey their mother at once."

The lord said: "Then I'll ride home,
such children I don't need."
And rode upon his horse
far, far away from the castle.
