= Jan Gerard Palm =

Curaçaoan musician (1831–1906)

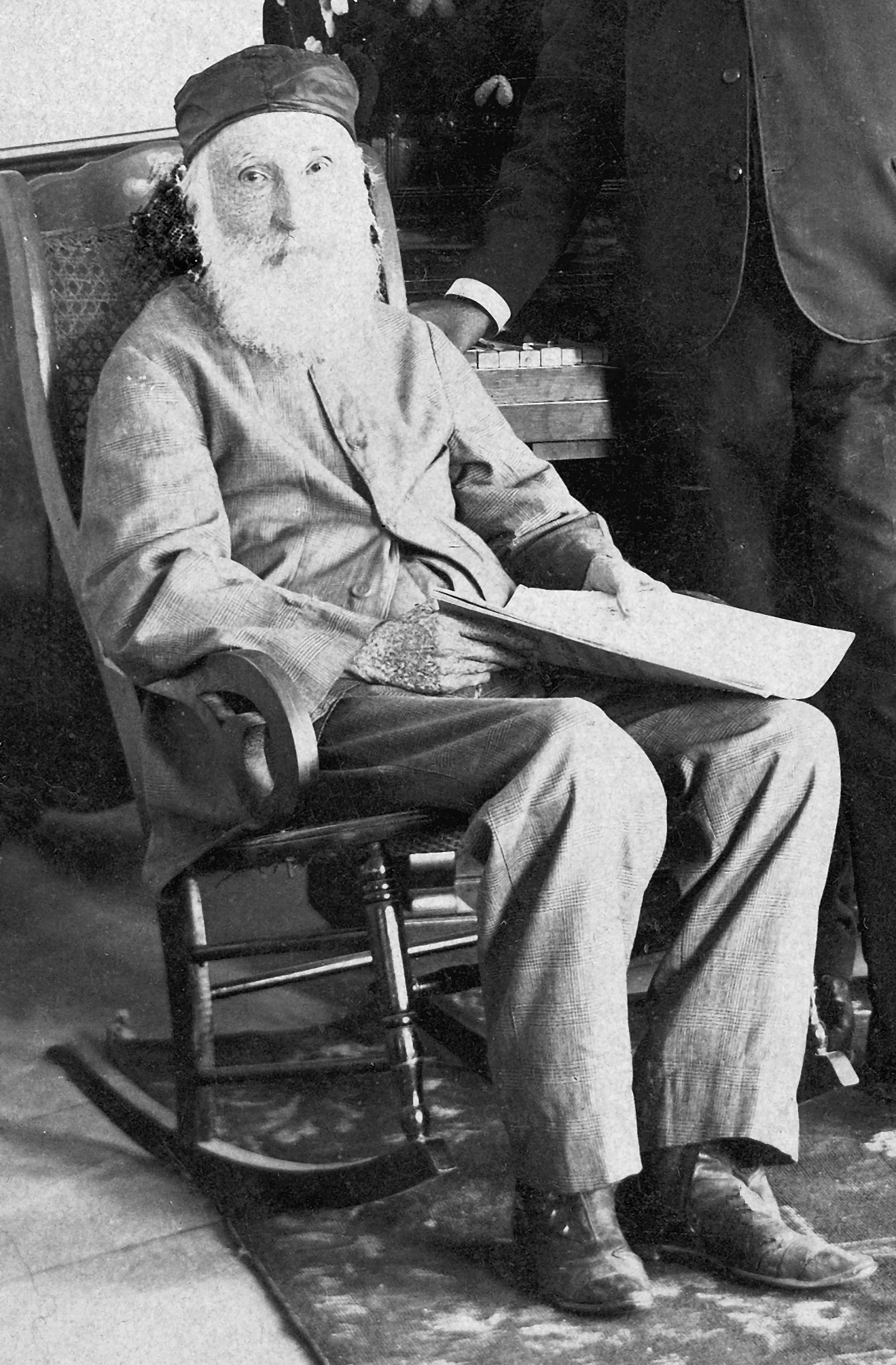
Jan Gerard Palm

Jan Gerard Palm (June 2, 1831 – December 13, 1906) was a composer from Curaçao.

== Biography ==
Palm was born in Curaçao and directed several music ensembles at a young age. In 1859, he was appointed as music director of the Citizen's Guard Orchestra in Curaçao. Palm played multiple musical instruments, including the piano, organ, lute, clarinet, flute, and mandolin. As an organist, Palm played for many years in the Jewish synagogues, Emanu-El and Mikvé Israel, the Protestant Fort Amsterdam Church, and the Lodge Igualdad in Curaçao. He regularly contributed to Notas y Letras (Notes and Letters), a periodical published in Curaçao between 1886 and 1888 with subscribers throughout Latin America and the Caribbean.

Palm died on December 13, 1906, at 75 years old. His descendants include the musicians and composers Rudolph Palm (1880–1950), John Palm (1885–1925), Toni Palm (1885–1963), Jacobo Palm (1887–1982), Albert Palm (1903–1958), Edgar Palm (1905–1998), and Robert Rojer (1939).

== Media ==
- Jeroen van der Wel (violin) and Bas van Bommel (piano), play Palm's Fantasía Zaira on YouTube
- Jeroen van der Wel (violin) and Bas van Bommel (piano) play Palm's Serenada nr. 2 on YouTube

== Sources ==
- Halman, Johannes and Robert Rojer (2008). Jan Gerard Palm: Life and Work of a Musical Patriarch in Curacao (In the Dutch language). Leiden: KITLV.
- Halman, Johannes and Robert Rojer (2008). Jan Gerard Palm Music scores: Waltzes, Mazurkas, Danzas, Tumbas, Polkas, Marches, Fantasies, Serenades, a Galop and Music Composed for Services in the Synagogue and the Lodge. Amsterdam: Broekmans & Van Poppel.
- Palm, Edgar (1978). Muziek en musici van de Nederlandse Antillen. Curacao: E. Palm.
- Boskaljon, Rudolph (1958). Honderd jaar muziekleven op Curacao. Anjerpublicaties 3. Assen: Uitg. in samenwerking met het Prins Bernhard fonds Nederlandse Antillen door Van Gorcum.
