= Tumba (music) =

Tumba is a musical form native to Bonaire, Aruba and Curaçao. The name comes from the Bantu culture in Congo. It is of African origin, although the music has developed since it was introduced on the island in the 17th century. The Curaçao-born composer Jan Gerard Palm was the first composer to write Curaçao tumbas. The lyrics can be very explicit. Nowadays, Tumba takes influences from the merengue and Latin jazz.
