= Jacobo Palm =

Curaçao-born composer

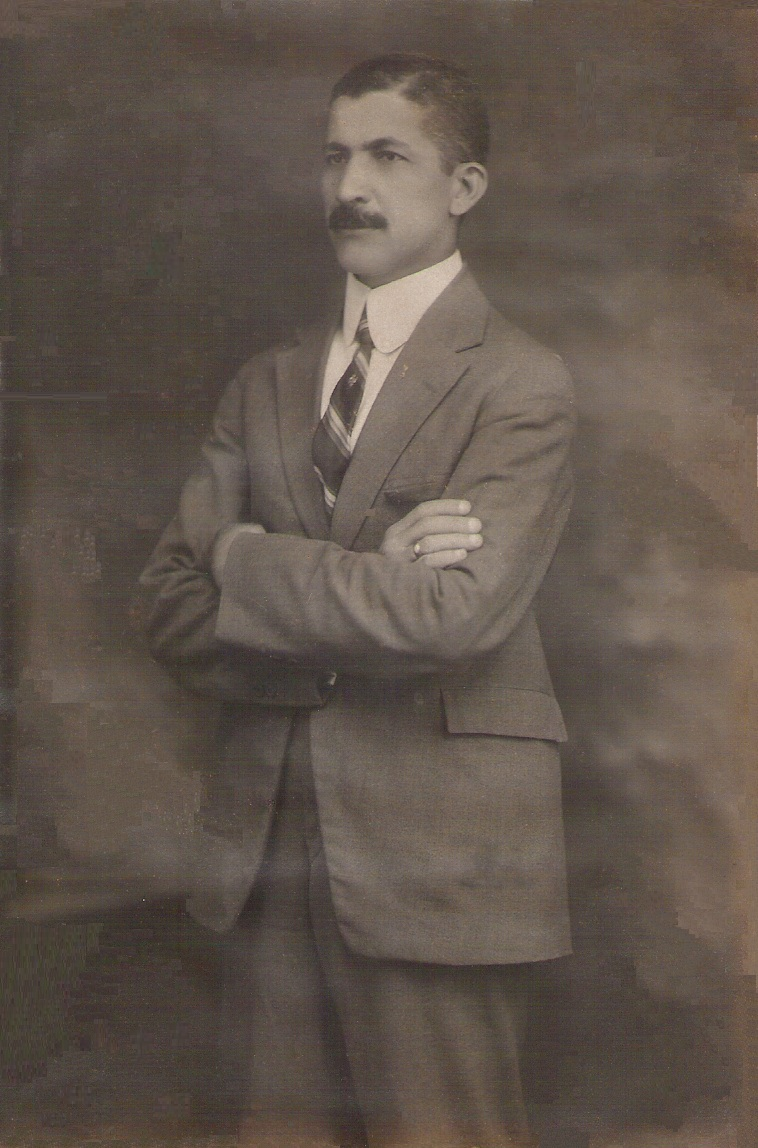
Jacobo Palm

Jacobo Palm (28 November 1887 – 1 July 1982) was a Curaçao-born composer.

== Biography ==
Jacobo José Maria Palm was the grandson of Jan Gerard Palm (1831-1906) who is often referred to as the "father of Curaçao classical music". At the age of seven Jacobo Palm started to take lessons in music from his grandfather. Jacobo played several musical instruments such as piano, organ, violin, clarinet and flute. As an organist, Palm played for more than 50 years (1914-1968) in the pro-cathedral Santa Ana in Curaçao. As a concert master, Jacobo Palm played for many years in the Curaçao Philharmonic Orchestra. He was also a member of the Curaçao string quartet in which he played the viola. As a concert pianist Jacobo Palm accompanied well known musicians such as Dalman from Argentina, Del Orbe from Santo Domingo, Luis Palma and the cellist Bogumil Sykora. Numerous students followed lessons in music from Jacobo Palm. They originate from countries such as The Netherlands Antilles, Aruba, Venezuela, Colombia and The Netherlands. His most talented students were his own daughters Irma Rojer-Palm (violin), Elsa Debrot-Palm (piano), Nelly Jongepier (piano), and composers Wim Statius Muller (piano) and his grandson Robert Rojer (piano).

== Compositions ==
As a composer, Palm wrote numerous pieces for piano, but also organ music for religious services and music for songs. His compositions not only reveal his admiration for the Polish composer Chopin but also a delicate sensitivity for the polyrhythmic character of Caribbean, Latin American and more in particular Curaçaon music. In 1981, 66 of his compositions were published.
