= Tourat =

- Location within Saint Lucia
- Coordinates: 13°58′25″N 60°59′48″W
- Country: Saint Lucia
- District: Castries District
- 2nd-order division: Tourat/Soucis

Tourat is a town on the island of Saint Lucia; it is located towards the western coast of the island near Barre Denis.

== See also ==
- List of cities in Saint Lucia
- Castries District
