= List of cities in Saint Lucia =

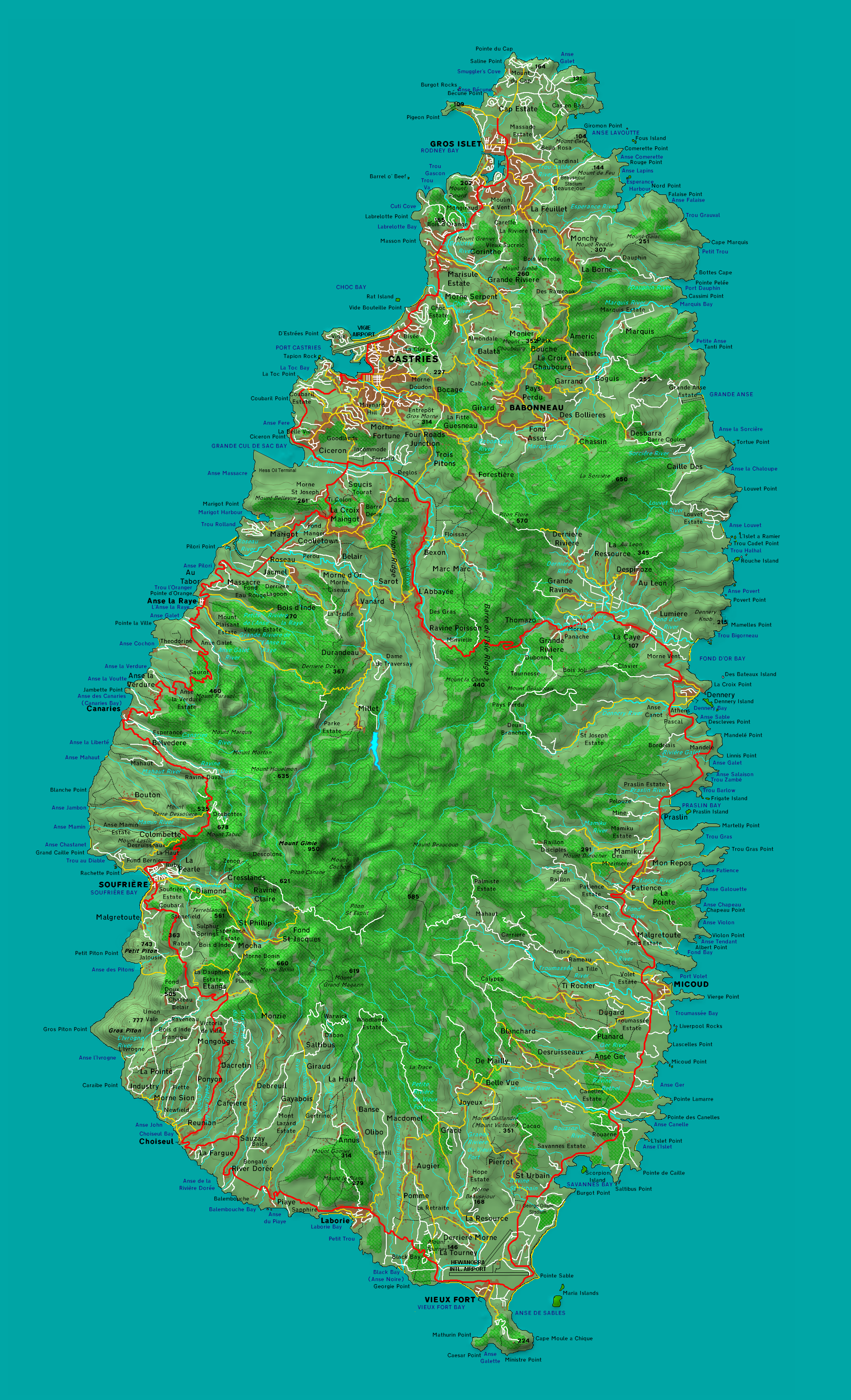
Map of Saint Lucia

Districts of Saint Lucia

This is a list of cities in the 10 districts of the island country of Saint Lucia. There are 150 inhabited places in Saint Lucia. The significant cities and the district where they are located are listed below.

== Cities ==
The following are the significant cities in Saint Lucia:

Cities in Saint Lucia
City	District	Population
Anse La Raye	Anse la Raye District; 13°56′46″N 61°02′20″W	1,256
Au Tabor	Anse la Raye District; 13°56′46″N 61°02′29″W	451
Babonneau	Castries District; 14°00′13″N 60°56′36″W	
Bisée	Castries District; 14°01′27″N 60°58′28″W	12,980
Bocage	Castries District; 14°00′07″N 60°58′10″W	1,127
Canaries	Canaries District; 13°54′08″N 61°03′53″W	1,862
Castries (capital)	Castries District; 13°59′45″N 61°00′22″W	20,000
Choiseul	Choiseul District; 13°46′22″N 61°02′58″W	346
Dennery	Dennery District; 13°54′51″N 60°53′29″W	2,870
Gros Islet	Gros Islet District14°04′00″N 60°57′00″W	2,362
Laborie	Laborie District; 13°45′00″N 60°59′00″W	1,131
Marigot Bay	Castries District; 13°57′50″N 61°01′34″W	799
Micoud	Micoud District13°49′00″N 60°54′00″W	3,406
Mon Repos	Micoud District (formerly Praslin Quarter); 13°51′35″N 60°54′08″W	982
Monchy	Gros Islet District; 14°03′11″N 60°55′48″W	416
Praslin	Micoud District; 13°52′32″N 60°53′50″W	1,906
Ravine Poisson	Castries District; 13°55′54″N 60°58′07″W	560
Rodney Bay	Gros Islet District; 14°04′23″N 60°57′16″W	509
Roseau	Anse la Raye District; 13°57′13″N 61°01′28″W	
Soucis	Castries District; 13°58′39″N 60°59′57″W	619
Soufrière	Soufrière District; 13°51′22″N 61°03′24″W	7,935
Ti Rocher, Castries	Castries District; 13°59′42″N 60°58′16″W	647
Ti Rocher, Micoud	Micoud District; 13°49′02″N 60°55′43″W	980
Vieux Fort	Vieux Fort District; 13°43′00″N 60°57′00″W	4,574

== See also ==
- Districts of Saint Lucia
