= Deglos =

- Location in Saint Lucia
- Coordinates: 13°57′39″N 060°58′27″W
- Country: Saint Lucia
- Quarter: Castries

Deglos is a settlement on the island of Saint Lucia; it is located at the northern end of the island towards its heart, between Trois Pitons and Barre Denis. In 2001 it had a population of 112 people in 30 households.
