= Barre Denis =

Town in Saint Lucia

- Location of Berre Denis within Castries District
- Coordinates: 13°58′13″N 60°59′41″W
- Country: Saint Lucia
- District: Castries
- Region: Barre Denis
- Town: Berre Denis

Population (2010)
  - Total: 699
- Barre Denis Region

Barre Denis is a second-order administrative division in Castries District on the island nation of Saint Lucia. It has a population of 699. The town within Barre Denis is called Berre Denis. Barre Densis is located at the northern end of the island towards its heart, between Deglos and Tourat.

== See also ==
- List of cities in Saint Lucia
- Castries District
