= Ti Rocher =

Ti Rocher is the name of the geographic items:

- Ti Rocher, Micoud, settlement of Micoud, St Lucia
- Ti Rocher, Castries, settlement of Castries, St Lucia
- Morne Ti Rocher, Mountain of Haiti
