= Sans Souci =

Sans souci is French for "no worries" or "carefree".

Sans Souci, Sans-souci, or Sanssouci may also refer to:

== Place names ==
=== Australia ===
- Sans Souci, New South Wales, a suburb of Sydney.

=== Canada ===
- Sans Souci, Ontario, a community located on Frying Pan Island, in Georgian Bay

=== Caribbean ===
- Sans Souci, a neighborhood Santo Domingo, Dominican Republic
- Sans-Souci Palace, Haiti
- Sans Souci, a village on the island of Wakenaam, Guyanna
- Sans Souci, a village in Toco, Trinidad and Tobago

=== Germany ===
- Sanssouci, the summer palace of Frederick the Great, King of Prussia, in Potsdam, Germany
  - Sanssouci Park, the park surrounding the palace

=== South Africa ===
- Sans Souci, KwaZulu-Natal, a settlement near the lower Tugela River

=== United States ===
- Sans Souci, Arkansas, an unincorporated community in Mississippi County
- Sans Souci, Florida, a place in Florida
- Sans Souci, Michigan, an unincorporated community
- Sans Souci, a neighborhood of New Rochelle, New York
- Sans Souci, South Carolina, a census-designated place
- Sans Souci Beach, an 1890s resort in Honolulu, Hawaii, named by George Lycurgus
- Sans Souci Island, an island located in the Cedar River at Waterloo, Iowa
- Sans Souci Valley, the former name of a valley in San Francisco
- Sans Souci Parkway, road in NE Pennsylvania

== Buildings and structures ==
=== Houses ===
- Sans Souci, a plantation in Caernarvon, Louisiana
- Sans Souci, Mumbai, the palatial house of David Sassoon, now the Masina Hospital
- Davenport House (New Rochelle, New York), also known as "Sans Souci", an NRHP gothic-revival estate in New Rochelle, New York
- Sans Souci (Hillsborough, North Carolina), a house in Hillsborough, North Carolina

=== Palaces ===
- Sans-Souci Palace, a once royal palace erected in Cap Haitian by Henry I, King of Haiti, in early 19th century
- Sanssouci, the former summer palace of Frederick the Great, King of Prussia, in Potsdam, Germany
- Bogor Palace, West Java, Indonesia, in colonial times also called Sans Souci

== Arts, entertainment, and media ==
- The Flute Concert of Sanssouci (1930), a German drama film
- "Sans Souci", a 1828 poem by Letitia Elizabeth Landon
- Sans Souci, a hotel in the fictional seaside town of Leahampton in Agatha Christie's mystery novel N or M?

=== Music ===
- Sans Souci (album), 2003 album by Australian band Frenzal Rhomb
- "Sanssouci" (song), a song by Rufus Wainwright, from his album Release the Stars
- "Sans Souci", a composition by Sonny Burke and Peggy Lee on the 1989 album The Peggy Lee Songbook: There'll Be Another Spring
- "Sans Souci", the alma mater song of Columbia College, Columbia University, New York City; see Stand, Columbia
- Sans Souci, a musician, singer-songwriter, and producer based in London

=== Theatres ===
- Sans Souci Theatre, London, 1796–1830s
- Sans Souci Theatre (Calcutta), India, 1839–1849

== People ==
- Emery J. San Souci, governor of Rhode Island in 1921
- Robert D. San Souci (1946–2014), American author and folklorist
- Jean-Baptiste Sans Souci (died 1803), leader of rebel slaves during the Haitian Revolution
- George SanSouci, American pool player
- Armand G. Sansoucy (1910–1983), American politician from Maine
- Brigitte Sansoucy, 21st-century Canadian politician
- Sans Souci, pseudonym of American author Nelly Nichol Marshall (1845–1898)

== Other uses ==
- Sans Souci Cabaret, a nightclub near Havana, Cuba
- USS Sans Souci II, a United States Navy patrol vessel in commission from 1917 to 1919
- Sans Souci Girls' High School, Newlands, Cape Town, South Africa
- Sans Souci, an Italian pale lager brand owned by Heineken International
- Sans Souci Parkway, a road connecting Nanticoke and Wilkes-Barre in Hanover Township, Luzerne County, Pennsylvania
- Sans Souci is a restaurant in Season 1, Episode 12 "Capitol Offense" (Murder, She Wrote)

== See also ==
- San Soucis, a town on the island of St. Lucia
