= Trois Pitons =

- Location in Saint Lucia
- Coordinates: 13.98405°N 60.97146°W
- Country: Saint Lucia
- District: Castries District

Population (2010)
  - Total: 452
- Trois Piton
- Demonym: Saint Lucia Census

Trois Pitons is a second-order administrative division and populated place in the Castries District of the island nation of Saint Lucia. it is located at the northern end of the island towards its heart, near Four Roads Junction, Dubrassay, and Ti Rocher.

== See also ==
- List of cities in Saint Lucia
- Castries District
