= Cas-en-Bas =

- Location in Saint Lucia
- Coordinates: 14°05′24″N 60°55′44″W
- Country: Saint Lucia
- Quarter: Gros Islet

Cas-en-Bas is a settlement in Saint Lucia; it is located in the north-east coast of the island.
