= Chassin =

- Location in Saint Lucia
- Coordinates: 13°59′N 060°55′W
- Country: Saint Lucia
- Quarter: Dauphin

Chassin is a town in the Babonneau region of the Caribbean island of Saint Lucia.

The town first received a piped water supply in 2000. An aerial tramway in the rainforest was built in 2006.
