= Bisée =

Town in Castries District, Saint Lucia

- Location in Castries District, Saint Lucia
- Coordinates: 14°01′27″N 60°58′28″W
- Country: Saint Lucia
- District: Castries
- Elevation: 48 m (157 ft)

Population (2010)
  - Total: 12,980
- Postal code: LC02

Bisée (sometimes spelled Bisee) is a town in Castries District, Saint Lucia. With a population of 12,980, it is the second largest town in Saint Lucia.

The Saint Lucia Bureau of Standards is located in Bisée.

== See also ==
- List of cities in Saint Lucia
