= 2007 Cricket World Cup Group C =

Cricket World Cup

The 2007 Cricket World Cup, which was played in the West Indies from 13 March to 28 April 2007, featured 16 teams, who were divided into four groups. Group C featured full ICC members England and New Zealand, and associate members Canada and Kenya. New Zealand beat England by 6 wickets in their opening match before beating Canada and Kenya by more than 100 runs each to finish top of the group, while England also managed comfortable wins against the two associate nations to join New Zealand in qualifying for the Super Eights. Kenya finished in third place by virtue of their opening victory over Canada.

== Table ==
Pos	Team	Pld	W	L	T	NR	Pts	NRR
1	New Zealand	3	3	0	0	0	6	2.138
2	England	3	2	1	0	0	4	0.418
3	Kenya	3	1	2	0	0	2	−1.194
4	Canada	3	0	3	0	0	0	−1.389

Source: ESPNcricinfo

== Canada vs Kenya ==
14 March
Scorecard

Canada; 199 (50 overs)	v	Kenya; 203/3 (43.2 overs)
Geoff Barnett 41 (50); Jimmy Kamande 2/25 (10 overs)		Steve Tikolo 72* (76); Anderson Cummins 1/32 (8 overs)

Kenya won by 7 wickets
Beausejour Stadium, Gros Islet
Umpires: Asad Rauf (Pak) and Peter Parker (Aus)
Player of the match: Steve Tikolo (Ken)

- Kenya won the toss and elected to field first.

Kenya captain Steve Tikolo was named man of the match after playing all the way through the chase, coming in at 52/2, with David Obuya and Ravindu Shah dismissed in single figures with a strike rate below 25. Nevertheless, only Canada's captain John Davison conceded less than 3.5 runs an over, as the three first Canadian bowlers, Umar Bhatti, Anderson Cummins and Henry Osinde conceded 16 wides among the 107 runs in 22.2 overs. The Kenyan spinners, on the other hand, took five for 78 from 29 overs, "strangling the scoring rate". Cummins became the second man to play World Cup cricket for two different countries, having represented West Indies in 1992.

== England vs New Zealand ==
16 March
Scorecard

England; 209/7 (50 overs)	v	New Zealand; 210/4 (41 overs)
Kevin Pietersen 60 (92); Shane Bond 2/19 (10 overs)		Scott Styris 87* (113); James Anderson 2/39 (8 overs)

New Zealand won by 6 wickets
Beausejour Stadium, Gros Islet
Umpires: Billy Doctrove (WI) and Rudi Koertzen (SA)
Player of the match: Scott Styris (NZ)

- New Zealand won the toss and elected to field.

Both teams had recently enjoyed series wins over Australia, but it was New Zealand who got revenge over England, who had beaten them for a place in the final of the January tri-series in Australia. England lost Ed Joyce for a duck off the first legitimate delivery of the match, and only Paul Nixon and Liam Plunkett, the numbers eight and nine, managed a strike rate above 70. With the fall of Paul Collingwood at the end of 35th over, New Zealand captain Stephen Fleming brought on Shane Bond, and he removed Kevin Pietersen, England's top scorer, and Andrew Flintoff in the same over. Jamie Dalrymple followed three overs later, as England had lost four wickets for five runs, but Nixon and Plunkett batted out the remaining 12 overs, making 71.

In reply, New Zealand lost two wickets in eight balls to James Anderson and Liam Plunkett, and also had captain Fleming back for a single-figure score. However, from then on they made 191 for the loss of only one wicket, Craig McMillan caught off Monty Panesar's bowling. Scott Styris and Jacob Oram added an unbeaten 138 for the fifth wicket, just ten runs off the New Zealand record from the 1999 World Cup, resulting in a man-of-the-match award for Styris.

== Canada vs England ==
18 March
Scorecard

England; 279/6 (50 overs)	v	Canada; 228/7 (50 overs)
Ed Joyce 66 (103); Sunil Dhaniram 3/41 (10 overs)		Ashif Mulla 58 (60); Ravi Bopara 2/43 (9 overs)

England won by 51 runs
Beausejour Stadium, Gros Islet
Umpires: Billy Doctrove (WI) and Peter Parker (Aus)
Player of the match: Paul Collingwood (Eng)

- Canada won the toss and elected to field.

== Kenya vs New Zealand ==
20 March
Scorecard

New Zealand; 331/7 (50 overs)	v	Kenya; 183 (49.2 overs)
Ross Taylor 85 (107); Thomas Odoyo 2/55 (10 overs)		Ravindu Shah 71 (89); James Franklin 2/20 (7.2 overs)

New Zealand won by 148 runs
Beausejour Stadium, Gros Islet
Umpires: Billy Doctrove (WI) and Rudi Koertzen (SA)
Player of the match: Ross Taylor (NZ)

- Kenya won the toss and elected to field.

== Canada vs New Zealand ==
22 March
Scorecard

New Zealand; 363/5 (50 overs)	v	Canada; 249 (49.2 overs)
Lou Vincent 101 (117); Kevin Sandher 2/58 (10 overs)		John Davison 52 (31); Jeetan Patel 3/25 (9.2 overs)

New Zealand won by 116 runs
Beausejour Stadium, Gros Islet
Umpires: Asad Rauf (Pak) and Billy Doctrove (WI)
Player of the match: Lou Vincent (NZ)

- Canada won the toss and elected to field.

== England vs Kenya ==
24 March
Scorecard

Kenya; 177 (43 overs)	v	England; 178/3 (33 overs)
Steve Tikolo 76 (97); James Anderson 2/27 (9 overs)		Ed Joyce 75 (90); Thomas Odoyo 1/27 (6 overs)

England won by 7 wickets
Beausejour Stadium, Gros Islet
Umpires: Rudi Koertzen (SA) and Peter Parker (Aus)
Player of the match: Ed Joyce (Eng)

- Kenya won the toss and elected to bat.

Ed Joyce's second fifty in as many matches helped England qualify for the Super Eights in what was essentially a play-off match, eliminating 2003 semi-finalists Kenya. Steve Tikolo came in at four after James Anderson had removed both openers, and though he made his 20th half-century, none of his team-mates passed 20. Extras were the second-highest contributor, with six wides and eight no-balls, most of the latter coming from Sajid Mahmood and Andrew Flintoff, who bowled three no-balls each. Flintoff did get Tikolo out with a yorker, while three of Kenya's players were run out as they were bowled out on the last ball of the rain-reduced innings.

Kenya's opening bowler Peter Ongondo extracted "tennis-ball bounce" to remove Michael Vaughan for one with the 19th ball of the game; however, despite Ian Bell getting caught for 16, England had reduced the equation to 126 off 34.2 overs after Joyce and Bell's partnership. With Kevin Pietersen also getting a fifty, England made it through with 10 overs to spare.
