= Four Roads Junction =

Settlement on the island of Saint Lucia

- Location in Castries District, Saint Lucia
- Coordinates: 13°59′36″N 60°58′36″W
- Country: Saint Lucia
- District: Castries

Four Roads Junction is a settlement on the island of Saint Lucia; it is located at the northern end of the island towards its heart, near Ti Rocher, Dubrassay, and Trois Pitons.
