= Ravine Poisson =

- Location in Castries District, Saint Lucia
- Coordinates: 13°55′54″N 60°58′07″W
- Country: Saint Lucia
- District: Castries
- Second-order: Ravine Poisson

Ravine Poisson is a second-order subdivision of Saint Lucia with a population of 560 in Castries District of Saint Lucia. Ravine Poisson is also the name of a village in the Ravine Poisson subdivision (13°55′48″N 60°58′30″W). The is also a stream with the name Ravine Poisson River (13°55′48″N 60°58′17″W).

== See also ==
- List of cities in Saint Lucia
- List of rivers of Saint Lucia
