= Ti Rocher, Castries =

- Location in Saint Lucia
- Coordinates: 13.9949°N 60.9711°W
- Country: Saint Lucia
- District: Castries
- 2nd order administrative division: Ti Rocher
- Elevation: 224 m (735 ft)

Population
  - Total: 647
- Saint Lucia Post: LC06 401

Ti Rocher is a settlement in the Castries District on the island of Saint Lucia. The village is located near the center of the island, near Four Roads Junction, Dubrassay, and Trois Pitons. It is nestled between the peaks of Mount du Chazeau and Gros Morne which separate the basin of Castries from the Valley of the Cul de Sac River.

== See also ==
- Casteries District
- List of cities in Saint Lucia
- List of rivers in Saint Lucia
- Ti Rocher, Micoud
