= Monchy, Saint Lucia =

Town and administrative division of Gros Islet District, Saint Lucia

Monchy
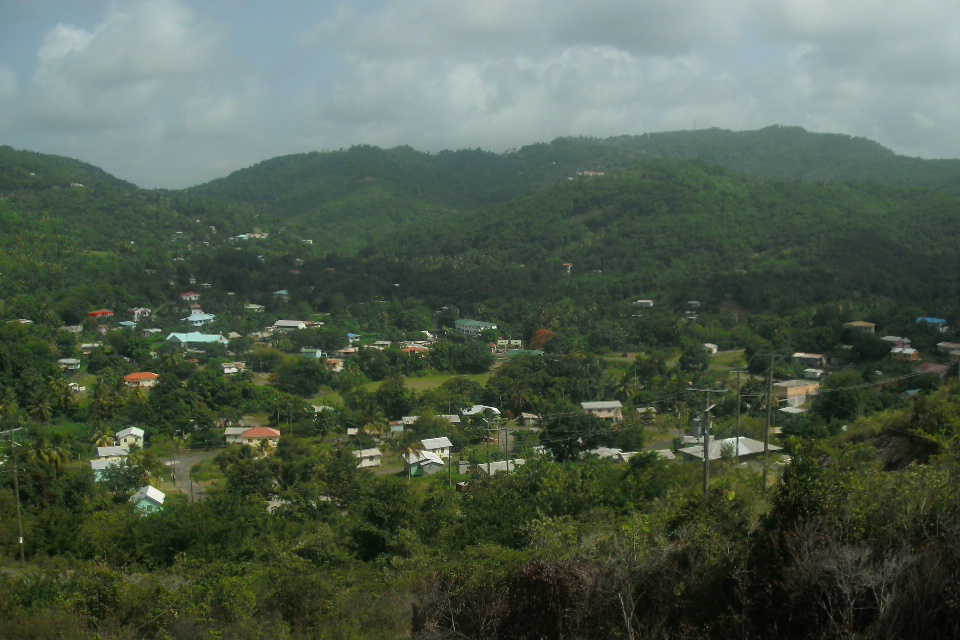

- Location in Saint Lucia
- Coordinates: 14.05319°N 60.92987°W
- Country: Saint Lucia
- District: Gros Islet District
- 2nd-order administrative division: Monchy
- Elevation: 22 m (72 ft)

Population
  - Total: 416
- Monchy 2nd-order administrative division
- Time zone: UTC-04:00 (Eastern Caribbean Time Zone)
- Post Code: LC01 301

Monchy is a town and second-order administrative division of Gros Islet District in the island nation of Saint Lucia. The town is located near the northern end of the island about 4 kilometres (2.5 mi) from Gros Islet, and about 7.9 kilometres (4.9 mi) from the capital, Castries.

== Notable people ==
- Vladimir Lucien, writer, critic and actor

== Nearby sites of interest ==
The following sites of interest are near Monchy:

- Comerette Point, 14°04′46″N 60°54′40″W
- Mount de Feu, 14°04′24″N 60°55′12″W
- Mount Galac, 14°03′04″N 60°54′17″W, 242 m elevation
- Mount des Bottes, 14°02′45″N 60°53′39″W, 242 m elevation
- Mount Reddie, 14°02′55″N 60°55′12″W, 288 m elevation
- Mount Layau, 14°03′44″N 60°56′00″W, 139 m elevation
- Pointe Pelée, 14°02′24″N 60°53′21″W
- Rouge Point, 14°04′31″N 60°54′34″W
- La Borne, 14°02′53″N 60°55′35″W (town)
- Cletus Village, 14°03′05″N 60°55′26″W (town)
- Dauphin, 14°02′21″N 60°54′19″W (town)
- La Feuillet, 14°03′05″N 60°56′18″W (town)
- Vieux Sucreic, 14°02′58″N 60°56′46″W (town)
- Caribbean Jewel Beach Resort, 14°03′33″N 60°57′12″W
- Sunset Hill Resort and Spa, 14°03′51″N 60°56′56″W

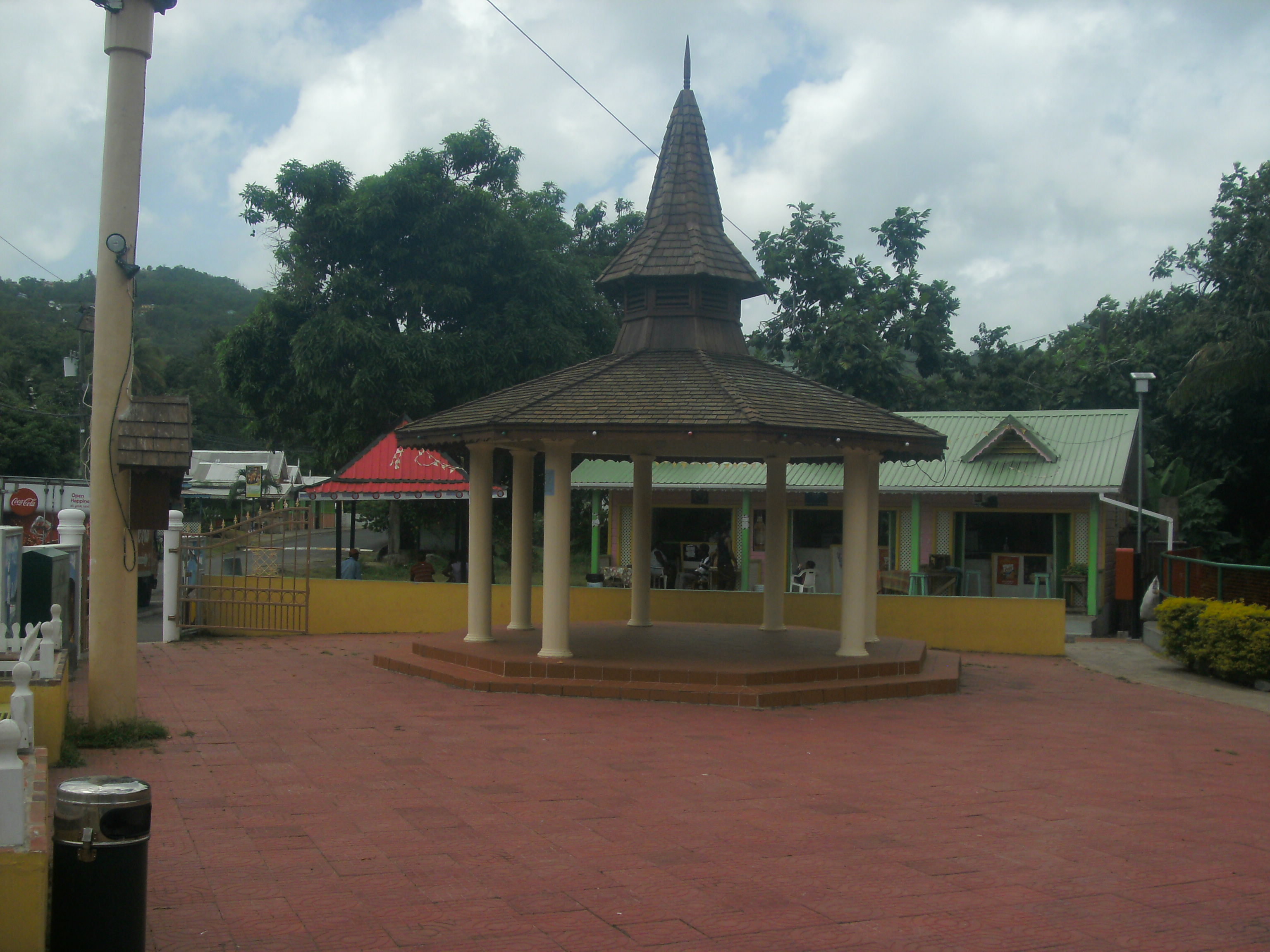
Monchy Park
