= Mon Repos, Saint Lucia =

Mon Repos
- Location of Mon Repos in Micoud District, Saint Lucia
- Coordinates (Mon Repos): 13°51′N 060°53′W
- Country: Saint Lucia
- District: Micoud District (formerly part of Praslin Quarter)
- Elevation: 81 m (266 ft)

Population
  - Total: 982

Mon Repos is a village in Saint Lucia. It is located on the Atlantic coast of Saint Lucia, near Praslin, in Micoud District. It contains many communities, including Lumbard, Mamiku, La Pointe (including Paris Drive, Phiadel, Morne Bois-Den), Patience, Collie Town (Knockay Avenue), St. Marie, Vietnam, Malgretoute, Ryon and Piton.

== Facilities ==
The village is the commercial center for these areas, housing a credit union, gas station, grocery and variety store, restaurants, a primary school, the St. Ann's Catholic Church and the Seventh Day Adventist Church, which operates a primary school. Three primary schools educate the village.

- Mon Repos (Roman Catholic) Combined School is located in the village.
- Patience Combined School, sits on the route to the Vietnamese community
- SDA primary school is also located in the village. It offers two day care centers and prechools.
- Smith's Preschool has operated the longest.

== Sports ==
The Mon Repos Youth and Sports Council is made up of a committee, that promotes positive change and influences among the youth and community members. The council hosts events such as pageants and sports competitions including the annual Independence Road Relay. Most communities have a sports club and come together to compete in football, cricket, netball, and athletics.

== Politics ==
Mon Repos is part of the Micoud North electoral area, which is represented in the House of Assembly of Saint Lucia.

== See also ==
- List of cities in Saint Lucia
- Districts of Saint Lucia
