= Babonneau =

Region and electoral district of Saint Lucia

- Electoral boundaries of Saint Lucia

- Location of Babonneau
- Coordinates: 14°00′13″N 60°56′36″W
- Country: Saint Lucia
- District: Castries District
- Elevation: 180 m (590 ft)

Babonneau is one of the regions of the Caribbean island nation of Saint Lucia. Babonneau is located in the north of the island in the Castries Quarter. There are extensive rain forests in the region, which is an important source of fresh water for Saint Lucia. Babonneau is also an electoral constituency of Saint Lucia represented in the House of Assembly of Saint Lucia, which extends into Gros Islet District.

== Government ==
The Babonneau District is an electoral district represented in the House of Assembly of Saint Lucia. The district has been represented since July 2021 by Virginia Albert Poyotte as the Parliamentary Representative. The district elected their representative during the countries general elections.

== Region and communities within Babonneau ==
The area of Babonneau contains 16 rural settlements with a population in 2001 of 6,602 and area of 1,196 acres (484 ha). The people of Babonneau are mainly of African descent, descendants of slaves brought by the French and British to Saint Lucia in the 18th and 19th Centuries. The French explorer Joseph Gaspard Tascher de la Pagerie settled in Babonneau in 1763. French-based creole (kwéyòl) also known as Patois is the preferred spoken language in Babonneau.

The community of Babonneau is three miles from Castries. The name comes from either a family with that last name or the French word barre-bonne-eau meaning “the ridge where there is good water” in English.

Saint Lucia has claim to two Nobel Prize recipients:

- Sir Arthur Lewis (born in 1914), Nobel Prize for Economics
- Derek Walcott (born in 1930), Nobel Prize for Literature

Communities and sites within Babonneau include:

- Cacoa, population: 520, 13°59′19″N 60°57′04″W
- Chassin, population: 310, 13°59′28″N 60°55′19″W
- Babonneau Proper, population: 543, 14°00′19″N 60°56′47″W
- Cabiche, population: 564, 14°00′21″N 60°57′16″W
- Resinard, population: 556, 14°00′10″N 60°56′31″W
- En Pois Doux, population: 6, 13°59′19″N 60°56′28″W
- Fond Assau, population: 706, 13°59′42″N 60°56′11″W
- Morne Assau, population: 36, 13°59′27″N 60°55′57″W
- Hill 20, population: 312, 13°59′58″N 60°57′00″W
- Babonneau Estate, 14°00′19″N 60°55′19″W (Gros Islet District)
- Babonneau Secondary School, 14°00′21″N 60°56′41″W
- Babonneau River mouth, 13°59′42″N 60°56′13″W (Gros Islet District)
Scenes of Babonneau
Foliage near Babonneau

Trees of Babonneau

== Election results ==
2025 Saint Lucian general election: Babonneau
Party	Candidate	Votes	%
Labour Party	John Paul Estephane	3,918	58.78%
UWP	James Geron	2,747	41.22%
Majority		1,171	17.56%
Turnout		6,665	51.65%	—
Labour Party hold

Source: https://results.sluelectoral.com/summary.php?id=2

== See also ==
- List of cities in Saint Lucia
- Districts of Saint Lucia
- Babonneau Estate
- Babonneau River
