= Chassin (surname) =

Chassin is a surname. Notable people with the surname include:

- Charles-Louis Chassin, French historian
- Lionel-Max Chassin, French Air Force general
- Youri Chassin, Canadian politician

== See also ==
- Chassin, Saint Lucia
