= Kervin Marc =

English fashion designer and former cricketer (born 1975)

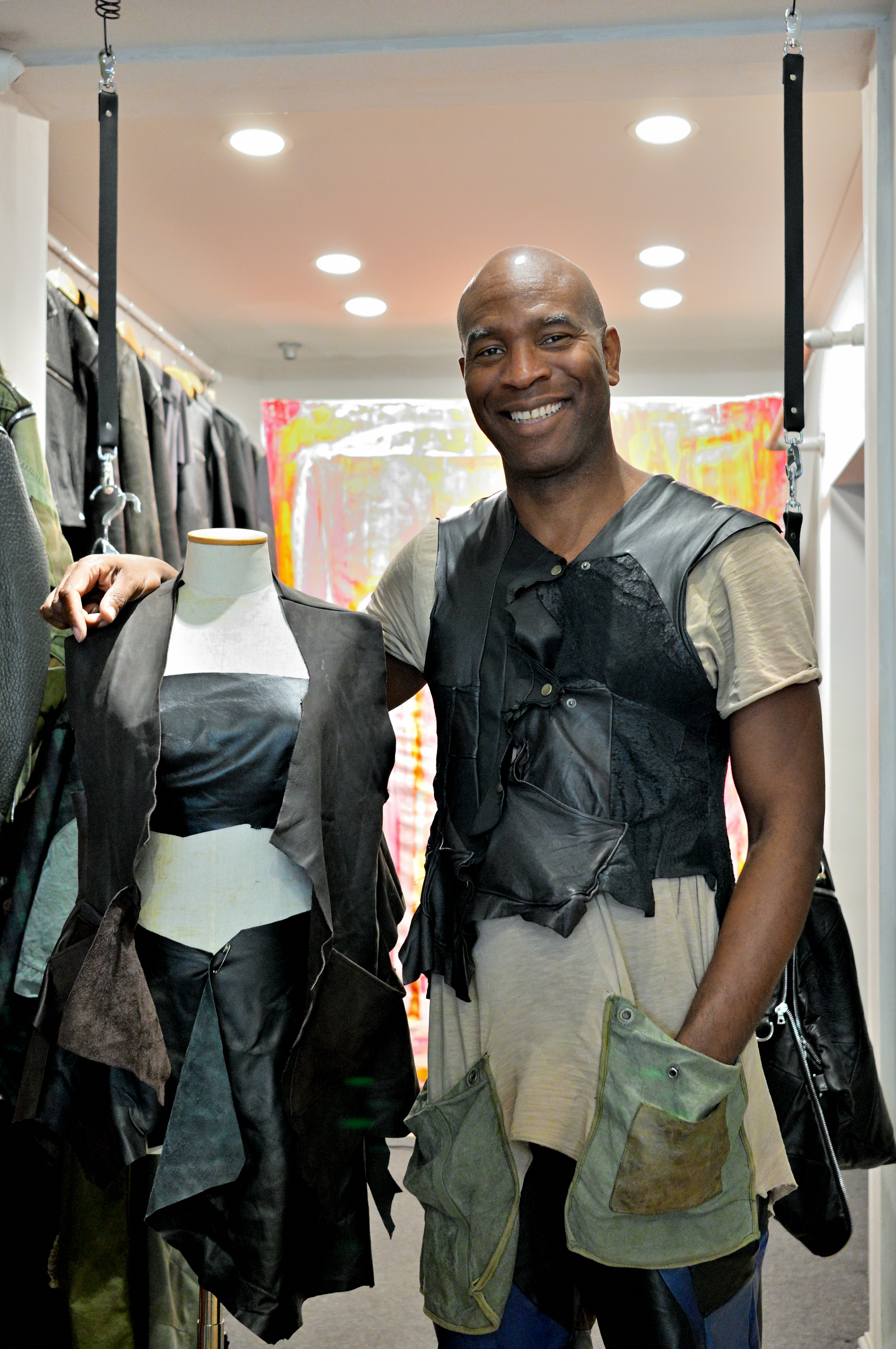
- Marc in 2026
- Born: January 9, 1975; Mon Repos, Saint Lucia
- Education: Central Saint Martins, London, England
- Known for: Fashion design, painting
- Website: www.kervinmarc.com

Kervin Marc (born 9 January 1975, in Mon Repos, Saint Lucia) is an artist and fashion designer based in London. He studied Product and Industrial Design at Central Saint Martins, and later began by selling leather and sheepskin garments at London’s Spitalfields Market. In 2021 he established a standalone Kervin Marc Boutique on Westbourne Grove.

Marc is also a former English cricketer who played first-class cricket for Middlesex County Cricket Club and Central Districts cricket team, and one-day cricket for Berkshire, Middlesex Cricket Board, Surrey Cricket Board and Hertfordshire in addition to coaching the Manawatu cricket team in the Hawke Cup.

Marc's work has been shown internationally in countries such as Italy, America, Japan, and Australia. He has showcased his artwork and fashion pieces in exhibitions such as The Bad Exhibition at Hoxton Gallery in 2013, The Missing Thread at Somerset House in 2023, and he has also appeared as a model in “Return of the Rudeboy”. His designs have been worn by figures such as Halle Berry.

For over a decade he has focused on sustainability: he has fashion and art projects that repurpose military surplus textiles into deconstructed clothing art. The Medill report describes his clothing line as “high-end unisex bespoke pieces” with each jacket handmade into a unique pattern.
