= Dubrassay =

Town on Saint Lucia island

Coordinates: 13°59′N 60°58′W

Dubrassay is a hamlet (officially a "settlement") on the Caribbean island of Saint Lucia, in the Castries District. It is also an administrative "Community" (second level division) within the District.

It is located at the northern end of the island, towards its heart, near Four Roads Junction, Ti Rocher, and Trois Pitons, and southeasterly from the city of Castries, the capital of the island country.

It consists of a single Back road.

There are 83 people in 24 households. There are only about 35 total buildings, according to Google Maps, with about 60 buildings in the administrative Community. It is moderately overcrowded, with 1.92 people per bedroom.

The unemployment rate was almost 30% as of 2010 in the wake of the Great Recession.

Voting is in Polling Division - Q1 of the Castries South/East electoral district, which also includes the nearby hamlet of Morne Fortune, amongst others.

== See also ==
- Community economic development
