= Dauphin Quarter =

Dauphin
- Quarter
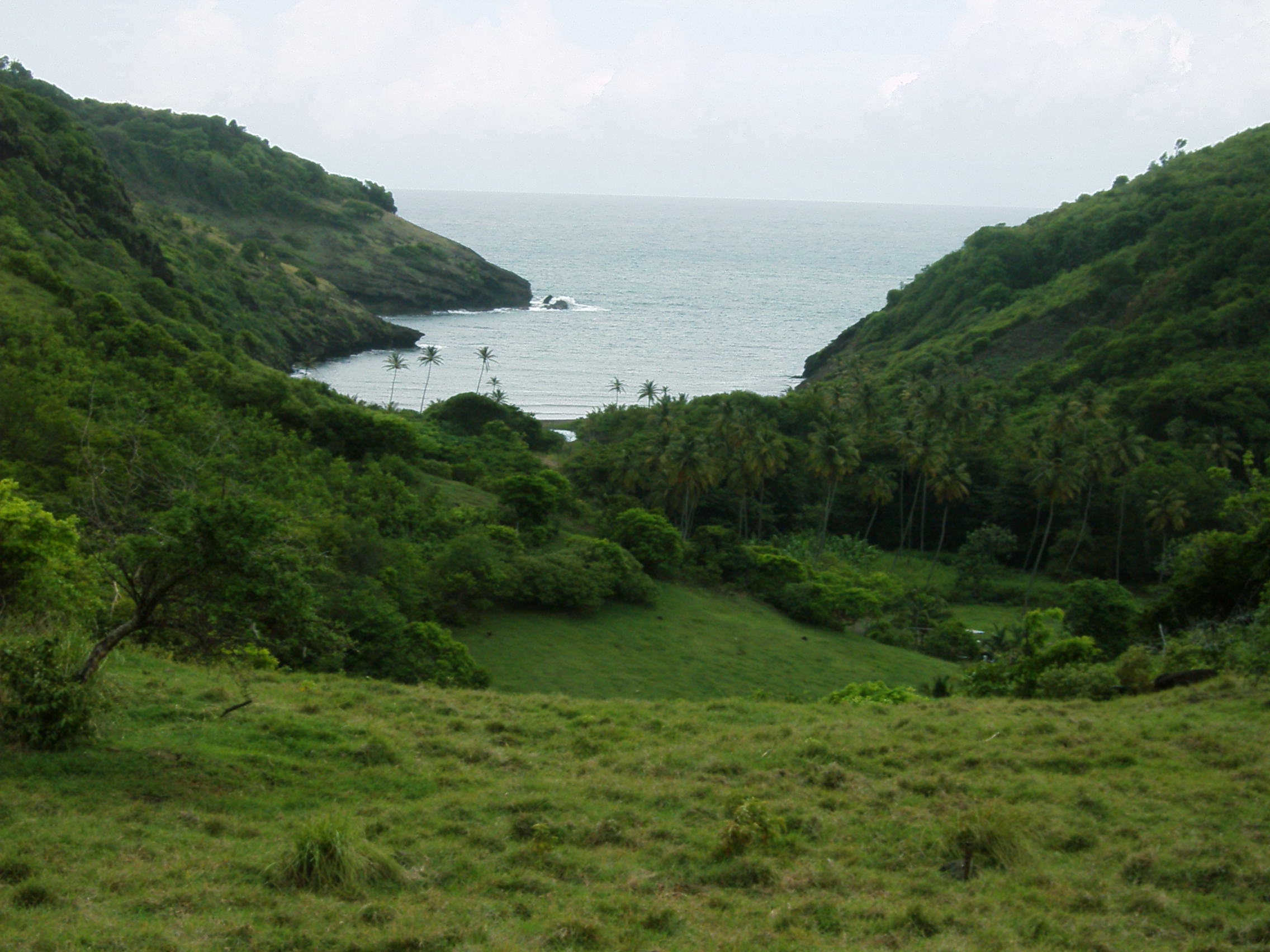
- Dauphin Bay

- Coordinates: 14°02′N 60°54′W
- Country: St. Lucia
- Current Districts: Gros Islet

Dauphin was a Quarter on the Caribbean island nation of Saint Lucia. The district was merged with Gros-Islet in 2014. It contains a village of the same name, located at 14°02′N 60°54′W. It was home to the Indigenous Kalinago who settled there. To this day, there are ruins which serve as a reminder of people who lived there long before Christopher Columbus crossed the Atlantic from Europe.

== History ==
Dauphin Quarter is a historical term created during the French colonization of Saint Lucia. It was given to the district and town by the French governor to honor the heir to the French throne, Dauphin of France.

Joséphine de Beauharnais, who married Napoleon Bonaparte and became Empress of France, was born in Dauphin.

== See also ==
- Quarters of Saint Lucia
