= Bois d'Orange River =

River in Saint Lucia

Location
- Country: Saint Lucia
- Region: Gros Islet Quarter

Physical characteristics
- Source
  - coordinates: 14.04123°N 60.95493°W
- Mouth: Caribbean Sea
  - coordinates: 14.06616°N 60.96630°W
  - elevation: 0 m (0 ft)

The Bois d'Orange River is a river in Gros Islet Quarter, Saint Lucia that flows into the Caribbean Sea.

== See also ==
- List of rivers of Saint Lucia
