= Louvet River =

River of Saint Lucia

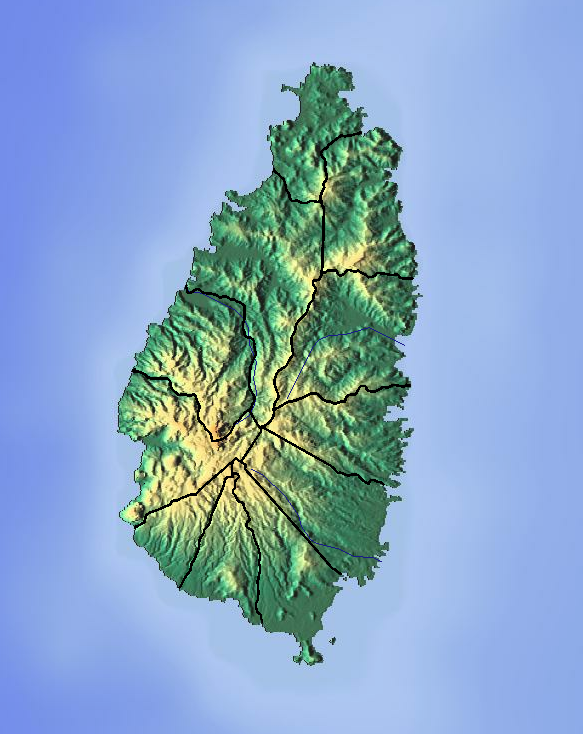
- Location of mouth

Location
- Country: Saint Lucia
- Region: Gros Islet Quarter

Physical characteristics
- Mouth
  - coordinates: 13°58′N 60°53′W

The Louvet River is a river of Saint Lucia. It drains from the forest area to the east coast.

== See also ==
- List of rivers of Saint Lucia
