= Dauphin River (Saint Lucia) =

River of Saint Lucia

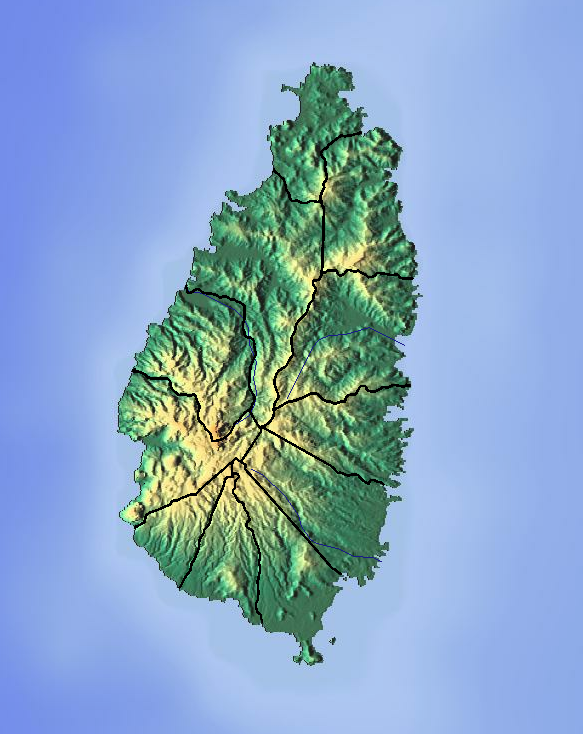
- Location of mouth

Location
- Country: Saint Lucia
- Region: Gros Islet Quarter

Physical characteristics
- Mouth: Atlantic Ocean
  - coordinates: 14°02′N 60°53′W
  - elevation: Sea level

The Dauphin River (Saint Lucia) is a river in Gros Islet Quarter, Saint Lucia.

== See also ==
- List of rivers of Saint Lucia
