= Mamiku =

Coordinates: 13°52′N 60°54′W

Mamiku is on the island of Saint Lucia; it is located on the eastern coast, near Mon Repos. The Mamiku Estate and Mamiku Gardens is an estate and botanical gardens. It was formerly a sugar plantation and is now a banana plantation.
