= Marquis River (Saint Lucia) =

River of Saint Lucia

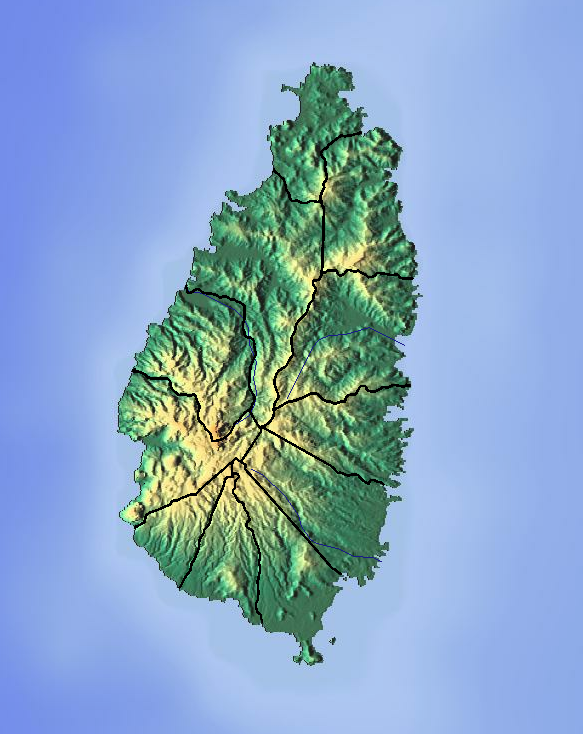
- Location of mouth

Location
- Country: Saint Lucia
- Region: Gros Islet Quarter

Physical characteristics
- Source
  - location: Forestiere
- Mouth
  - location: Marquis Estate
  - coordinates: 14°01′N 60°54′W

The Marquis River is a river of Saint Lucia.

== See also ==
- List of rivers of Saint Lucia
