= Choiseul, Saint Lucia =

Choiseul
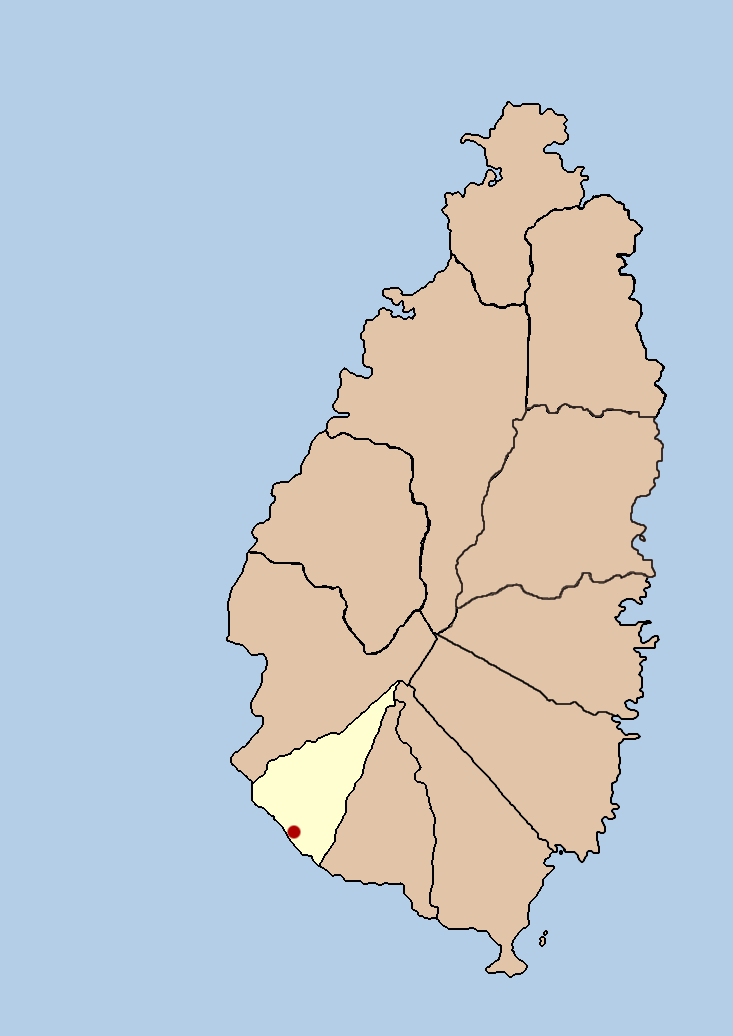
- Coordinates: 13.7744°N 61.0505°W
- Country: Saint Lucia
- District: Choiseul District
- Founded: 18th Century
- Original name: Anse Citron
- Founder: The French

Government
  - Governing body: Choiseul Village Council
- Elevation: 58 m (190 ft)

Population (2005)
  - Total: 6,323 (Choiseul District)
- Time zone: UTC-4 (Eastern Caribbean Time Zone (ECT))
- Area code: 758

Choiseul was originally known as Anse Citron, and an independent parish was established in 1765. In 1769 a census was done and recorded 75 whites, 25 free coloured, 512 negroes and 69 estates in Choiseul. However, most activity was originally in the River Dorée area, south-east of Choiseul.

== History ==
An Anglican church at River Dorée was built in 1846 and the first school was opened in 1848. The area was primarily run by English plantation owners and by the end of the 19th century the population was approximately 4,000.

A Catholic church was built in Choiseul village at the end of the 19th century by Father Pierre Prudent René. It took several years to build and by 1914 the church was completed.

E. F. Joseph, noted American photographer was born in Choiseul.

== Current activities ==
Today, Choiseul is known for its local arts and crafts such as grass place mats, chairs, coal pots and woven baskets.
