= Cap Point =

Northernmost point in Saint Lucia

Coordinates: 14.110439°N 60.944660°W

Cap Point (Saint Lucia)

Cap Point (French Pointe du Cap) is the northernmost point in Saint Lucia in the Caribbean. It is located in Gros Islet District on the Cap Estate/Upper Saline Point.
