= Ti Rocher, Micoud =

- Location of Ti Rocher in the Micoud District, Saint Lucia
- Coordinates: 13.81734°N 60.92858°W
- Country: Saint Lucia
- Quarter: Micoud
- Elevation: 106 m (348 ft)

Population (2010)
  - Total: 980
- Saint Lucia Post Office Moreau: LC14 101

Ti Rocher is a town in the Micoud District of the island nation of Saint Lucia. It is also a second-level division in Micoud District.

== Geography ==
The village is located on the heights above the town of Micoud and south of the Troumassee River. The next villages are Moreau (N), Anbre (E), Fond D’Or (S), La Courville (SW), Des Blanchard (SW), und Paix Bouche (W) and Tou Cochan/Ti Rocher (NW).

== See also ==
- List of cities in Saint Lucia
- Micoud District
- Geography of Saint Lucia
- Ti Rocher, Castries
