= E. F. Joseph =

Saint Lucian-born American photographer, photojournalist (1900–1979)

- Born: Emmanuel Francis Joseph; November 8, 1900; Choiseul, Saint Lucia, British West Indies
- Died: September 27, 1979 (aged 78); Oakland, California, U.S.
- Resting place: Sunset View Cemetery, El Cerrito, California, U.S.
- Education: American School of Photography
- Occupations: Photographer, photojournalist
- Years active: 1920s–1970s
- Spouse(s): Alyce E. Gibbons (m. 1930–1963; her death); Lucy Lartique (m. 1968–1979; his death)

Emmanuel Francis Joseph, commonly known as E. F. Joseph (November 8, 1900 – September 27, 1979) was a Saint Lucian-born American photographer and photojournalist. He worked for the Pittsburgh Courier, The Chicago Defender, and the San Francisco Chronicle. Joseph was the first African American commercial photographer in the San Francisco Bay Area.

== Life and career ==
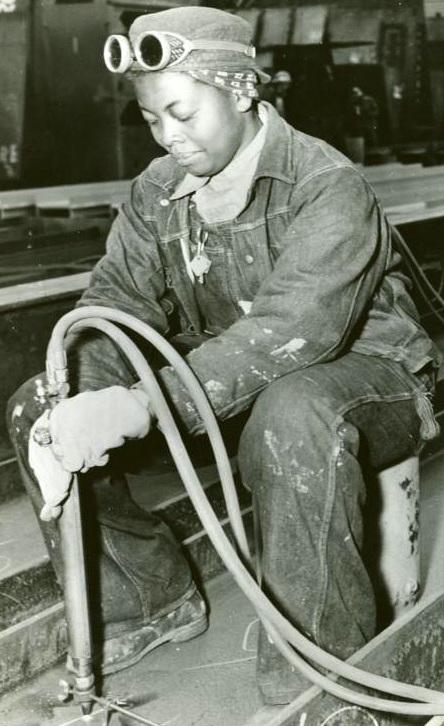
Photo by E. F. Joseph, African American Worker Richmond Shipyards (April 1943)

Emmanuel Francis Joseph was born on November 8, 1900, in Choiseul, Saint Lucia, British West Indies. He graduated in 1924, from the American School of Photography in Chicago, Illinois.

After graduation, Joseph moved to Oakland, California where he apprenticed at a photography studio. In 1930 he was married to his first wife Alyce E. Gibbons from Marysville, California, and he naturalized to the United States.

In the 1930s, he started to work as a photojournalist. He worked as a photojournalist for various newspapers over the span of his career including the Pittsburgh Courier, The Chicago Defender, California Voice, San Francisco Chronicle, and the Oakland Post. He had a photography studio was run out of his home initially at 1303 Adeline Street, Oakland, and later at 384-50th Street in Oakland. His first wife Alyce assisted his work.

During World War II, Joseph worked for the United States Office of War Information as a photographer. Some of his most notable photographs were made during this era, including his “Rosie the Riveters” series taken at the Richmond Shipyard.

He retired from photography in the early 1970s.

== Death and legacy ==
Joseph died at age 79 on September 27, 1979, in Oakland. He was interred at Sunset View Cemetery in El Cerrito, California.

He was the subject the book,The Picture Man: From the Collection of Bay Area Photographer E. F. Joseph, 1927–1979 (2018) by Careth Reid and Ruth Beckford.

His photography was highlighted in the solo exhibition, Likeness: Portraits by E. F. Joseph (2022), presented by the Society of California Pioneers, Exhibit Envoy and the San Joaquin County Historical Museum.

== See also ==
- Rosie the Riveter World War II Home Front National Historical Park in Richmond, California
