= Esperance River =

River of Saint Lucia

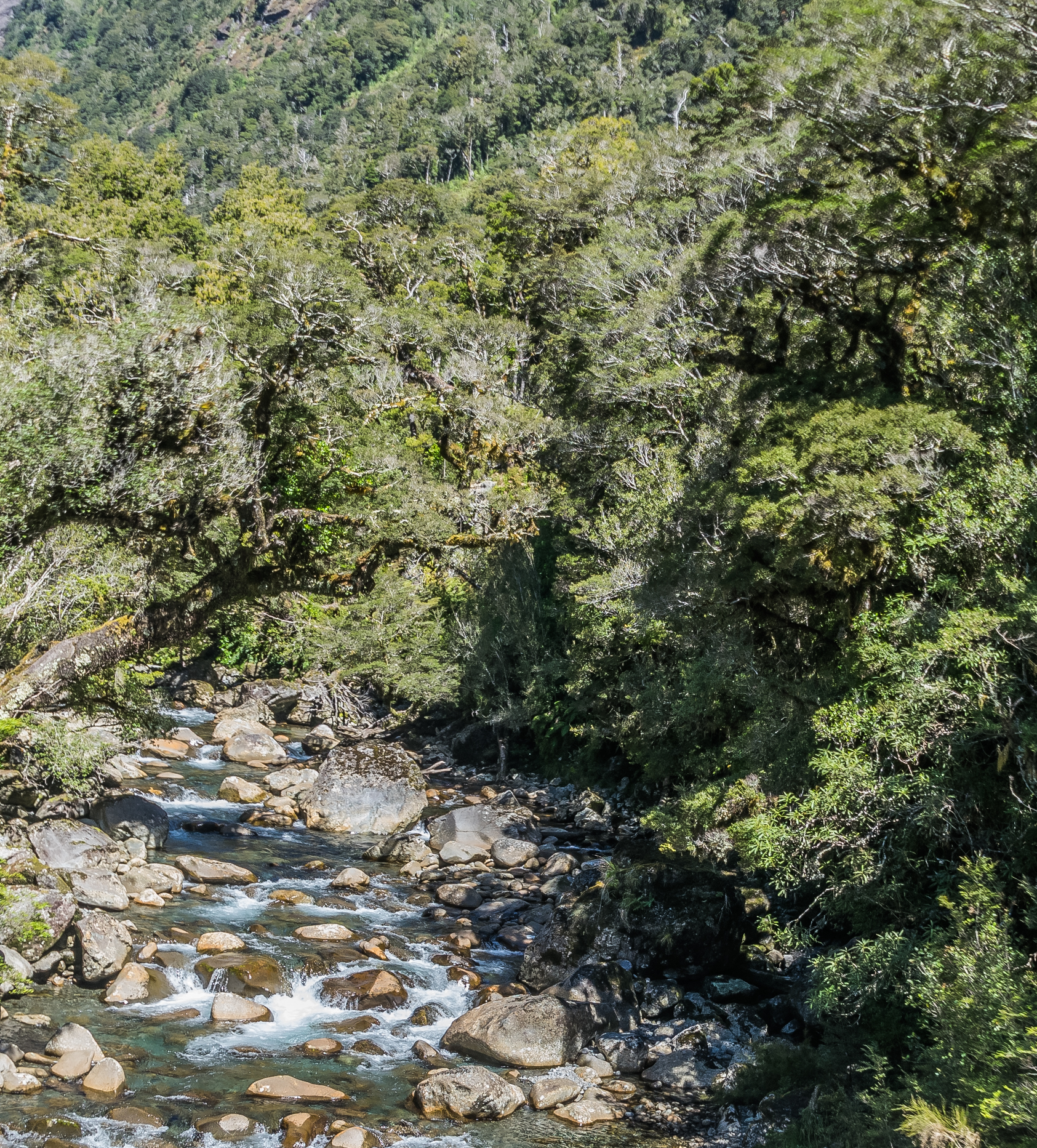

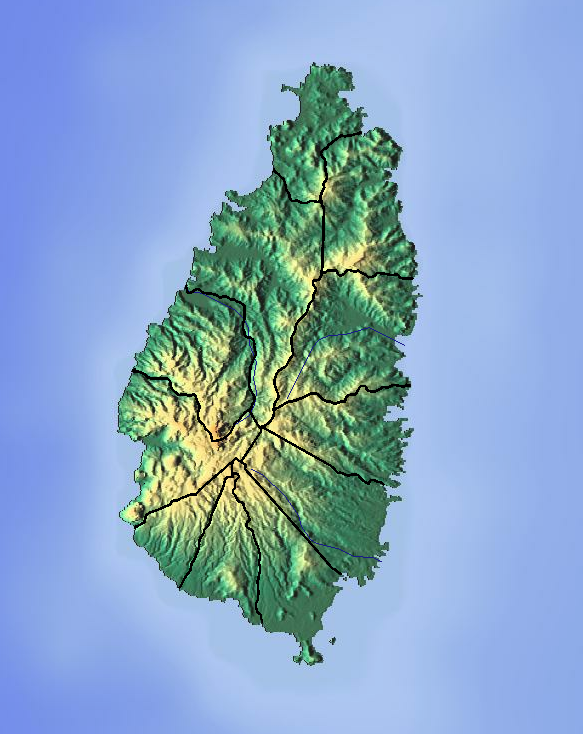
- Location of mouth

Location
- Country: Saint Lucia
- Region: Gros Islet Quarter

Physical characteristics
- Mouth: Atlantic Ocean
  - coordinates: 14°03′N 60°54′W

The Esperance River is a river in Gros Islet Quarter in the island country of Saint Lucia.

== See also ==
- List of rivers of Saint Lucia
