= Praslin Quarter =

Former quarter or district of Saint Lucia

Praslin
- Location of Praslin Quarter within Saint Lucia

- Location of Praslin in Micoud District, Saint Lucia
- Coordinates: 13.87545°N 60.89717°W
- Country: Saint Lucia
- District: Micoud District
- 2nd-order administrative division: Praslin

Population (2010)
  - Total: 341
- Praslin 2nd-order subdivision

Praslin Quarter was a former quarter on the island nation of Saint Lucia. Since at least 2001, it has been a second-order subdivision of the Micoud District. The 2001 and 2010 Census show Praslin as part of the Micoud District. The population of Praslin is 341.

== Places of interest ==
Other places of interest in the Praslin region are:

- Old Settlement (13°53′00″N 60°54′00″W)
- Praslin Bay (13°52′25″N 60°53′18″W)
- Praslin Island (13°52′31″N 60°53′23″W)
- Praslin Estate (13°53′01″N 60°53′47″W).
- Rivière des Trois Islets stream, (13°52′44″N 60°53′45″W)

== History ==
An English explorer, Thomas Warner, sent Capt. Judlee with 300-400 Englishmen to establish a settlement at Praslin Bay but they were attacked over three weeks by Caribs, until the few remaining colonists fled on 12 October 1640.

== See also ==
- List of cities in Saint Lucia
- Districts of Saint Lucia
