= Virginia Albert-Poyotte =

Saint Lucian politician

The Right Honourable, Order of the British Empire Virginia Albert-Poyotte OBE, MP
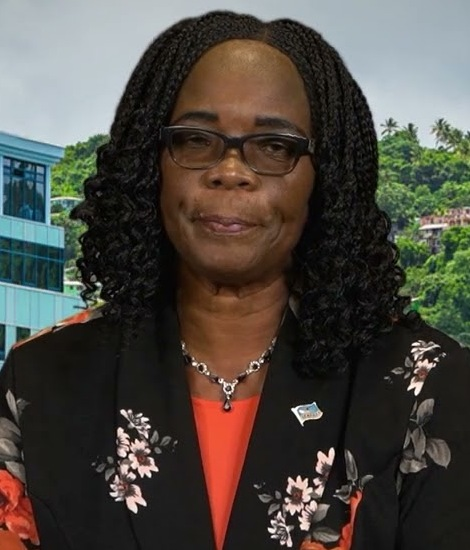

Member of Parliament for Babonneau
- Assuming office 26 July 2021
- Succeeding: Ezechiel Joseph

Minister for the Public Service, Home Affairs, Labour and Gender Affairs.
- Incumbent
- Assumed office 5 August 2021

Personal details
- Born: Virginia Albert Plateau, Babonneau
- Party: Saint Lucia Labour Party

Virginia Albert-Poyotte, OBE, is a Saint Lucian politician and former veteran educator. She is the Minister for the Public Service, Home Affairs, Labour and Gender Affairs. Poyotte, the endorsed Saint Lucia Labour Party candidate was elected at the 2021 Saint Lucian General Election as the representative in the House of Assembly for the constituency of Babonneau.

== Post career ==
Poyotte taught at the Babonneau and the Laguerre Primary Schools from 1971 to 1988. Poyotte once served as the president of the Saint Lucia Teachers Union and General Secretary to the Caribbean Union of Teachers (CUT) .
