= Daren Sammy Cricket Ground =

Cricket ground

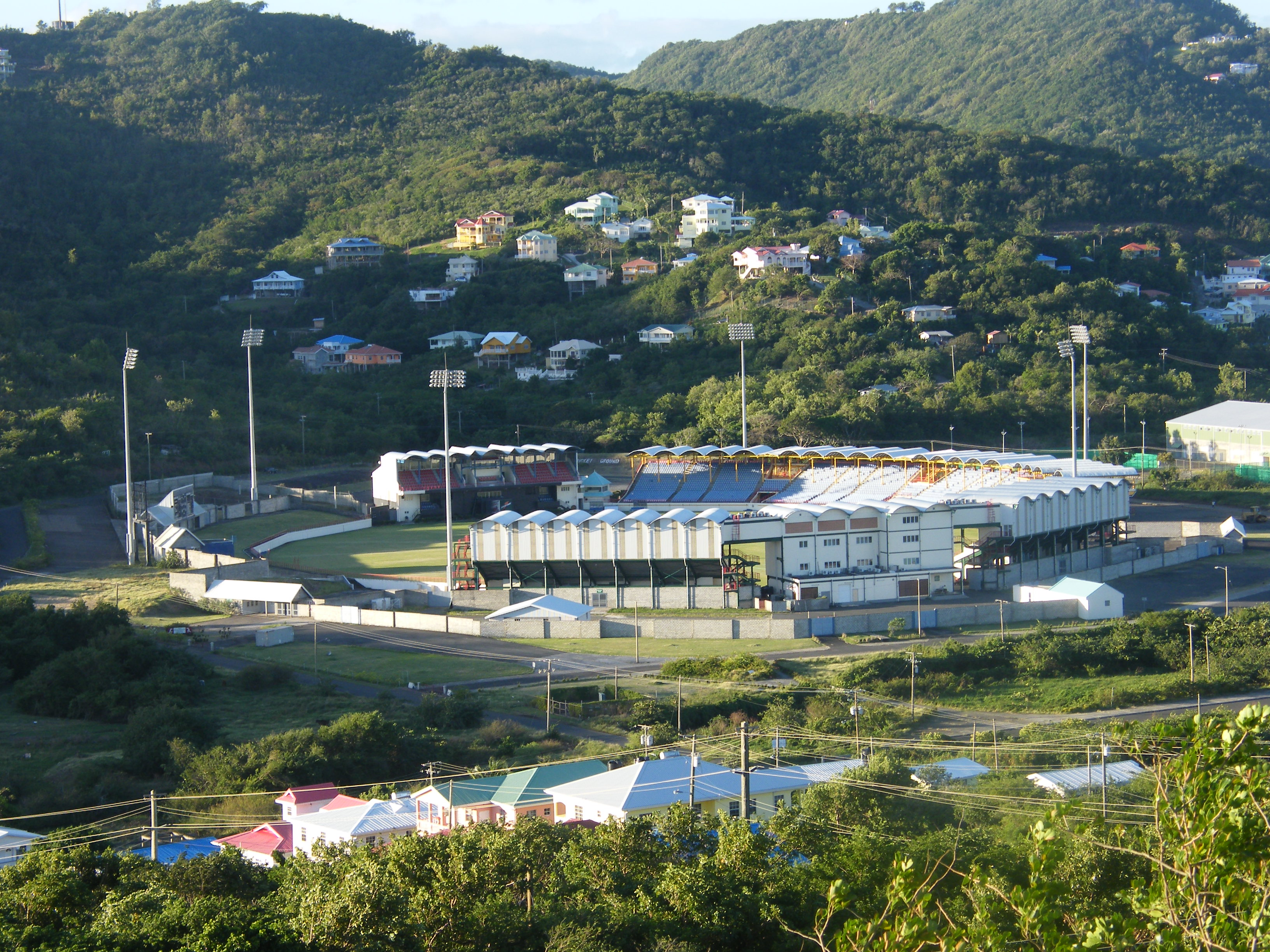
- Daren Sammy Cricket Ground (previously Beausejour Cricket Ground).
- Interactive map of Daren Sammy Cricket Ground

Ground information
- Location: Gros Islet, Saint Lucia
- Country: West Indies
- Coordinates: 14°04′14.00″N 60°55′53.95″W
- Establishment: 2002
- Capacity: 15,000
- Tenants: Windward Islands; St Lucia Kings
- End names
- Pavilion End; Media Centre End

International information
- First men's Test: 20–24 June 2003: West Indies v Sri Lanka
- Last men's Test: 24–27 June 2022: West Indies v Bangladesh
- First men's ODI: 8 June 2002: West Indies v New Zealand
- Last men's ODI: 2 March 2019: West Indies v England
- First men's T20I: 1 May 2010: Afghanistan v India
- Last men's T20I: 24 June 2024: India v Australia
- First women's ODI: 16 October 2015: West Indies v Pakistan
- Last women's ODI: 1 July 2023: West Indies v Ireland
- First women's T20I: 13 May 2010: Australia v India
- Last women's T20I: 8 July 2023: West Indies v Ireland

Team information
Windward Islands	(2003 – present)
St Lucia Kings	(2013 – present)
- As of 18 July 2023; Source: Cricinfo

The Daren Sammy Cricket Ground, previously the Beausejour Cricket Ground, is a cricket ground located near Gros Islet, Saint Lucia standard seating capacity of 15,000. It was completed in 2002.

Originally named after the Beausejour hills and situated in the outskirts of Rodney Bay, the stadium was completed in 2002 and hosts domestic matches for the Windward Islands cricket team. It staged its first international Test match in 2003 against Sri Lanka and became the first venue in the Caribbean to host a day-night game.

The sporting facility was constructed on 22 acres consisting of about 18 hospitality suites and a pavilion that offers each team its own gym and lounge apart from a balcony and conference room. It is located in the driest area of Saint Lucia, making it most suitable for hosting cricket.

On 21 July 2016, it was formally renamed the Daren Sammy Cricket Ground after Daren Sammy, who captained the West Indies side in winning the 2012 ICC World Twenty20 in Sri Lanka. He also captained the West Indies to victory in the 2016 ICC World Twenty20 in India, making him the second West Indian captain after Clive Lloyd with multiple ICC world championships. One of the stands will also be named in honour of Johnson Charles, who was also part of the side in both 2012 and 2016.

The first international match played at the renamed ground took place on 9 August 2016, when India played the West Indies as part of a four-match Test series.

== Location ==
The cricket ground is located at the north-eastern end of the tourist resort of Rodney Bay, approximately 6 minutes drive from the town of Gros Islet on the scenic Castries-Gros Islet Highway. The stadium is close to the residential enclaves in Beauséjour and Epouge Bay.

== Facilities ==
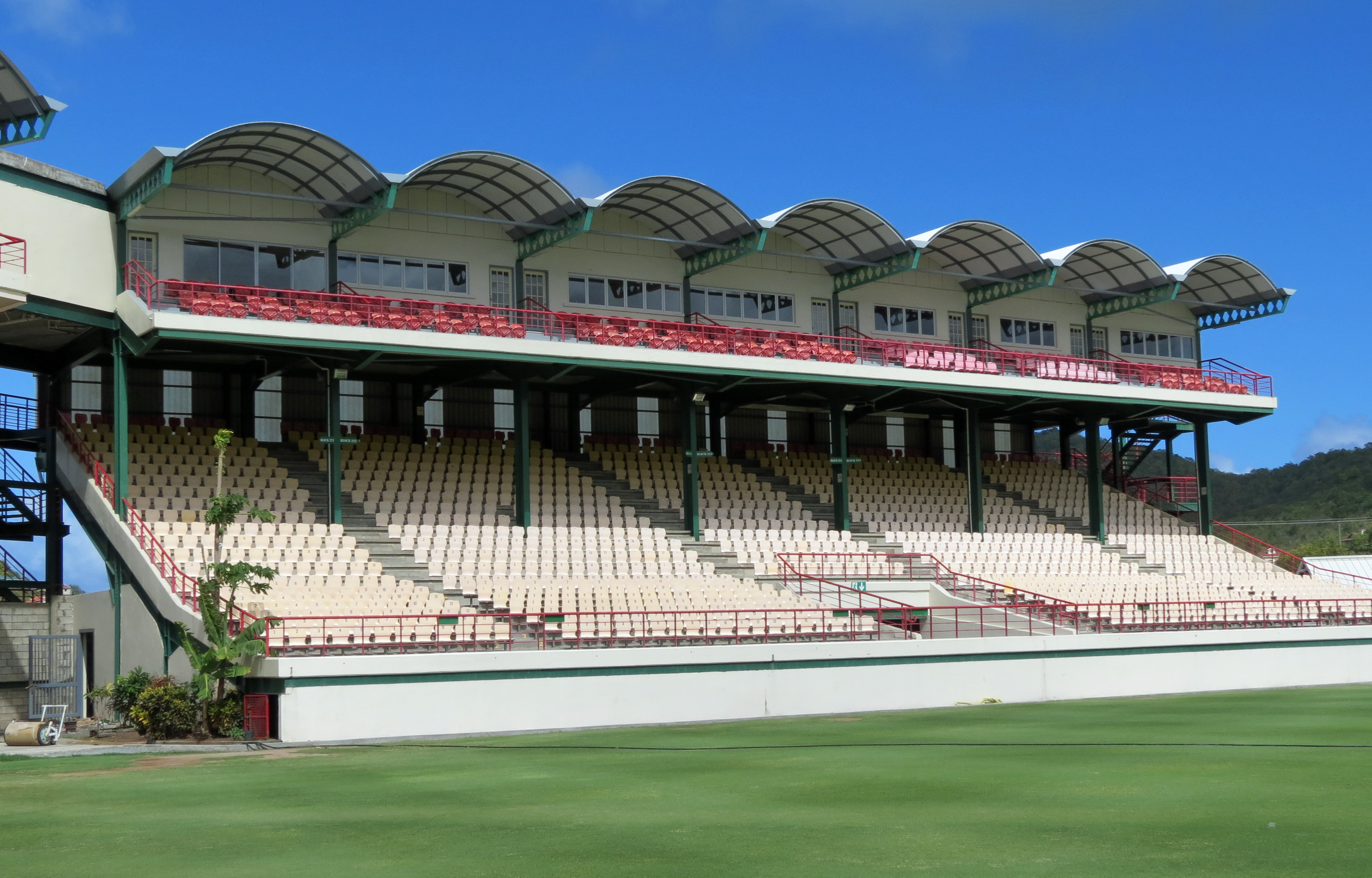
Main stand.

The cricket ground is known for its high standard facilities and is regarded by the West Indies Cricket Board as a standard for current and future venues in the Caribbean. Its outfield, a perfect oval, is predictably lush green. It also became the first international ground in the Caribbean to receive floodlighting with the installation of 6 floodlight towers in 2006, enabling the hosting of day/night matches. In May 2006 it hosted the first ever international Day/Night ODI match in the Caribbean when the West Indies took on Zimbabwe. Due to the unfavourable time zone differences between the Caribbean and the large cricket markets in the far east international day/night matches have been few and far between.

The facility has 18 hospitality suites, a permanent seating capacity of 13,000 with bucket-type seating which can be increased to 20,000 for international matches. There are also two artificial pitches and two turfs for practice and warm-ups.

== Ground statistics ==
=== Regional cricket ===
- It serves as a home venue for the Windward Islands cricket team along with the Mindoo Philip Park in Castries.

=== International cricket ===
- It has been a venue for all forms of cricket in the West Indies since 2003.

=== Cricket records ===
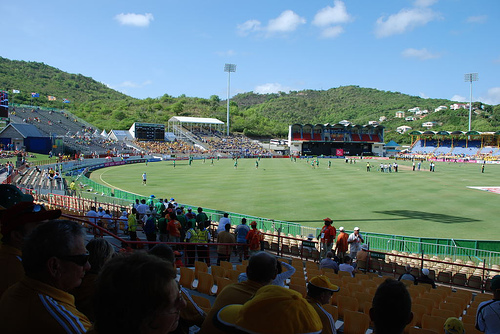
The stadium from the side stands.

- First One Day International: West Indies vs New Zealand on 8 June 2002.
- First Test match: West Indies vs Sri Lanka on 20–24 June 2003.
- Highest team score (in Tests)- India (588–8) vs West Indies in 2006.
- Highest team total (in ODIs) – New Zealand( 363–5) vs Canada in 2007.
- Highest team total (in T20Is) – Australia (197–7) vs Pakistan in 2010.
- Best Bowling (in ODIs) – Rashid Khan (7/18) vs West Indies in 2017.
- Hat-tricks (in Test) – Keshav Maharaj vs West Indies in 2021.

== List of centuries ==
As of 12 July 2021

=== Test centuries ===
As of July 2021 a total of 18 centuries have been scored in international test cricket on the ground.

Centuries in Men's Test Matches at the Daren Sammy Cricket Ground
No.	Score	Player	Team	Balls	Inns.	Opposing team	Date	Result
1	118	Marvan Atapattu	Sri Lanka	275	1	West Indies	20 June 2003	Drawn
2	113	Wavell Hinds	West Indies	143	2	Sri Lanka	20 June 2003	Drawn
3	209	Brian Lara (1/2)	West Indies	360	1	Sri Lanka	20 June 2003	Drawn
4	113	Habibul Bashar	Bangladesh	131	1	West Indies	28 May 2004	Drawn
5	111	Mohammad Rafique	Bangladesh	152	1	West Indies	28 May 2004	Drawn
6	141	Chris Gayle	West Indies	293	2	Bangladesh	28 May 2004	Drawn
7	103*	Khaled Mashud	Bangladesh	281	3	West Indies	28 May 2004	Drawn
8	180	Virender Sehwag	India	190	1	West Indies	10 June 2006	Drawn
9	146	Rahul Dravid	India	234	1	West Indies	10 June 2006	Drawn
10	148*	Mohammed Kaif	India	243	1	West Indies	10 June 2006	Drawn
11	120	Brian Lara (2/2)	West Indies	307	3	India	10 June 2006	Drawn
12	101*	Shivnarine Chanderpaul	West Indies	134	3	Bangladesh	13 September 2014	Won
13	118	Ravichandran Ashwin	India	297	1	West Indies	9 August 2016	Won
14	104	Wriddhiman Saha	India	227	1	West Indies	9 August 2016	Won
15	119*	Dinesh Chandimal	Sri Lanka	186	1	West Indies	14 June 2018	Drawn
16	122	Joe Root	England	225	3	West Indies	9 February 2019	Won
17	102*	Roston Chase	West Indies	191	4	England	9 February 2019	Lost
18	141*	Quinton de Kock	South Africa	170	2	West Indies	10 June 2021	Won

=== One-Day International centuries ===
As of July 2021 a total of seven centuries have been scored in one-day international cricket on the ground.

Centuries in Men's One-Day Internationals at the Daren Sammy Cricket Ground
No.	Score	Player	Team	Balls	Inns.	Opposing team	Date	Result
1	108*	Shivnarine Chanderpaul	West Indies	138	2	New Zealand	8 June 2002	Won
2	130	Marcus Trescothick	England	138	1	West Indies	1 May 2004	Lost
3	124	Chris Gayle	West Indies	137	2	Pakistan	22 May 2005	Lost
4	101	Lou Vincent	New Zealand	117	1	Canada	22 March 2007	Won
5	102	Ahmed Shehzad	Pakistan	148	2	West Indies	25 April 2011	Won
6	102	Kieron Pollard	West Indies	70	1	Australia	23 March 2012	Won
7	106*	Marlon Samuels	West Indies	104	1	Pakistan	21 July 2013	Lost

== List of five wicket hauls ==
=== Tests ===
Twelve five wicket hauls in Test matches have been taken at the venue.

No.	Bowler	Date	Team	Opposing team	Inn	Overs	Runs	Wkts	Econ	Result
1	Corey Collymore	20 June 2003	West Indies	Sri Lanka	1	29	66	5	2.27	Drawn
2	Muttiah Muralitharan	20 June 2003	Sri Lanka	West Indies	2	50	138	5	2.76	Drawn
3	Kemar Roach	14 September 2014	West Indies	Bangladesh	2	20	42	5	2.10	Won
4	Sulieman Benn	14 September 2014	West Indies	Bangladesh	4	32	72	5	2.25	Won
5	Bhuvneshwar Kumar	9 August 2016	India	West Indies	2	23.4	33	5	1.39	Won
6	Miguel Cummins	9 August 2016	West Indies	India	3	11	48	6	4.36	Lost
7	Shannon Gabriel	14 June 2018	West Indies	Sri Lanka	1	16	59	5	3.68	Drawn
8	Shannon Gabriel	14 June 2018	West Indies	Sri Lanka	3	20.4	62	8	3.00	Drawn
9	Mark Wood	9 February 2019	England	West Indies	2	8.2	41	5	4.92	Won
10	Lungi Ngidi	10 June 2021	South Africa	West Indies	1	13.5	19	5	1.37	Won
11	Kagiso Rabada	10 June 2021	South Africa	West Indies	3	20	34	5	1.7	Won
12	Keshav Maharaj	21 June 2021	South Africa	West Indies	4	17.3	36	5	2.1	Won

=== One Day Internationals ===
Three five wicket hauls in One-Day Internationals have been taken at the venue.

No.	Bowler	Date	Team	Opposing team	Inn	Overs	Runs	Wkts	Econ	Result
1	Andrew Flintoff	2 April 2009	England	West Indies	2	5	19	5	3.80	Won
2	Rashid Khan	9 June 2017	Afghanistan	West Indies	2	8.4	18	7	2.07	Won
3	Oshane Thomas	2 March 2019	West Indies	England	2	5.1	21	5	4.06	Won

== Events ==
=== 2007 Cricket World Cup matches ===
It was one of the venues of the 2007 Cricket World Cup, the most important tournament in international cricket, hosting 7 matches, including all 6 Group C matches. New Zealand went the round unbeaten, twice scoring a total beyond 300 runs. The second semi-final between the defending champions Australia and South Africa was played here with an official attendance of 13,875.

=== Group matches ===
14 March 2007
(scorecard)

Canada; 199 all out (50 overs)	v	Kenya; 203/3 (43.2 overs)

Kenya won by 7 wickets
Beausejour Cricket Ground, Gros Islet, Saint Lucia

16 March 2007
(scorecard)

England; 209/7 (50 overs)	v	New Zealand; 210/4 (41 overs)

New Zealand won by 6 wickets
Beausejour Cricket Ground, Gros Islet, Saint Lucia

18 March 2007
(scorecard)

England; 279/6 (50 overs)	v	Canada; 228/7 (50 overs)

England won by 51 runs
Beausejour Cricket Ground, Gros Islet, Saint Lucia

20 March 2007
(scorecard)

New Zealand; 331/7 (50 overs)	v	Kenya; 183 all out (49.2 overs)

New Zealand won by 148 runs
Beausejour Cricket Ground, Gros Islet, Saint Lucia

22 March 2007
(scorecard)

New Zealand; 363/5 (50 overs)	v	Canada; 249/9 (49.2 overs)

New Zealand won by 114 runs
Beausejour Cricket Ground, Gros Islet, Saint Lucia

24 March 2007
(scorecard)

Kenya; 177 all out (43 overs)	v	England; 178/3 (33 of 43 overs)

England won by 7 wickets
Beausejour Cricket Ground, Gros Islet, Saint Lucia

=== Semi-final ===
25 April 2007
Scorecard

South Africa; 149 all out (43.5 overs)	v	Australia; 153/3 (31.3 overs)

Australia won by 7 wickets
Beausejour Cricket Ground, Gros Islet, Saint Lucia

=== 2010 World Twenty20 matches ===
In 2010, the stadium hosted 10 matches of the 2010 ICC World Twenty20 along with two other stadiums in Caribbean. Four of the matches were Group stage games, four Super 8 matches and both semi-finals of the tournament (one of the semi-finals due to bad weather preventing matches from being held at the Providence Stadium in Guyana).

The stadium saw the third international Twenty20 century scored by Indian batsman Suresh Raina in the Group match between India and South Africa.

=== Group matches ===
1 May 2010
Scorecard

Pakistan; 172/3 (20 overs)	v	Bangladesh; 151/7 (20 overs)

Pakistan win by 21 runs.
Beausejour Cricket Ground, Gros Islet, Saint Lucia

1 May 2010
Scorecard

Afghanistan; 115/8 (20 overs)	v	India; 116/3 (14.5 overs)

India win by 7 wickets.
Beausejour Cricket Ground Gros Islet, Saint Lucia

2 May 2010
Scorecard

India; 186/5 (20 overs)	v	South Africa; 172/5 (20 overs)

India win by 14 runs.
Beausejour cricket Ground, Gros Islet, Saint Lucia

2 May 2010
Scorecard

Australia; 191/10 (20 overs)	v	Pakistan; 157/10 (20 overs)

Australia win by 34 runs.
Beausejour Cricket Ground, Gros Islet, Saint Lucia

=== Super 8 matches ===
10 May 2010
Scorecard

Pakistan; 148/7 (20 overs)	v	South Africa; 137/7 (20 overs)

Pakistan win by 11 runs.
Beausejour Cricket Ground, Gros Islet, Saint Lucia

10 May 2010
Scorecard

New Zealand; 149/6 (20 overs)	v	England; 153/7 (19.1 overs)

England win by 3 wickets.
Beausejour Cricket Ground, Gros Islet, Saint Lucia

11 May 2010
Scorecard

India; 163/5 (20 overs)	v	Sri Lanka; 167/5 (20 overs)

Sri Lanka win by 5 wickets.
Beausejour Cricket Ground, Gros Islet, Saint Lucia

11 May 2010
Scorecard

West Indies; 105/10 (19 overs)	v	Australia; 109/4 (16.2 overs)

Australia win by 6 wickets.
Beausejour Cricket Ground, Gros Islet, Saint Lucia

=== Semi-finals ===
13 May 2010
Scorecard

Sri Lanka; 128/6 (20 overs)	v	England; 132/3 (16 overs)

England win by 7 wickets.
Beausejour Cricket Ground, Gros Islet, Saint Lucia

14 May 2010
Scorecard

Pakistan; 191/6 (20 overs)	v	Australia; 197/7 (19.5 overs)

Australia win by 3 wickets.
Beausejour Cricket Ground, Gros Islet, Saint Lucia

== 2024 ICC Men's T20 World Cup matches ==
15 June 2024
20:30 UTC−4 (N)
Scorecard

Scotland; 180/5 (20 overs)	v	Australia; 186/5 (19.4 overs)
Brandon McMullen 60 (34); Glenn Maxwell 2/44 (4 overs)		Travis Head 68 (49); Mark Watt 2/34 (4 overs)

Australia won by 5 wickets
Daren Sammy Cricket Ground, Gros Islet
Umpires: Michael Gough (Eng) and Asif Yaqoob (Pak)
Player of the match: Marcus Stoinis (Aus)

- Australia won the toss and elected to field.
- England qualified for the Super 8 while Scotland were eliminated as a result of this match.

16 June 2024
20:30 UTC−4 (N)
Scorecard

Sri Lanka; 201/6 (20 overs)	v	Netherlands; 118 (16.4 overs)
Charith Asalanka 46 (21); Logan van Beek 2/45 (4 overs)		Michael Levitt 31 (23); Nuwan Thushara 3/24 (3.4 overs)

Sri Lanka won by 83 runs
Daren Sammy Cricket Ground, Gros Islet
Umpires: Allahudien Paleker (SA) and Alex Wharf (Eng)
Player of the match: Charith Asalanka (SL)

- Netherlands won the toss and elected to field.

17 June 2024
20:30 UTC−4 (N)
Scorecard

West Indies; 218/5 (20 overs)	v	Afghanistan; 114 (16.2 overs)
Nicholas Pooran 98 (53); Gulbadin Naib 2/14 (2 overs)		Ibrahim Zadran 38 (28); Obed McCoy 3/14 (3 overs)

West Indies won by 104 runs
Daren Sammy Cricket Ground, Gros Islet
Umpires: Chris Brown (NZ) and Allahudien Paleker (SA)
Player of the match: Nicholas Pooran (WI)

- Afghanistan won the toss and elected to field.

=== Super 8s ===
19 June 2024
20:30 UTC−4 (N)
Scorecard

West Indies; 180/4 (20 overs)	v	England; 181/2 (17.3 overs)
Johnson Charles 38 (34); Moeen Ali 1/15 (2 overs)		Phil Salt 87* (47); Roston Chase 1/19 (3 overs)

England won by 8 wickets
Daren Sammy Cricket Ground, Gros Islet
Umpires: Nitin Menon (Ind) and Ahsan Raza (Pak)
Player of the match: Phil Salt (Eng)

- England won the toss and elected to field.

21 June 2024
10:30 UTC−4
Scorecard

South Africa; 163/6 (20 overs)	v	England; 156/6 (20 overs)
Quinton de Kock 65 (38); Jofra Archer 3/40 (4 overs)		Harry Brook 53 (37); Keshav Maharaj 2/25 (4 overs)

South Africa won by 7 runs
Daren Sammy Cricket Ground, Gros Islet
Umpires: Chris Brown (NZ) and Sharfuddoula (Ban)
Player of the match: Quinton de Kock (SA)

- England won the toss and elected to field.

24 June 2024
10:30 UTC−4
Scorecard

India; 205/5 (20 overs)	v	Australia; 181/7 (20 overs)
Rohit Sharma 92 (41); Mitchell Starc 2/45 (4 overs)		Travis Head 76 (43); Arshdeep Singh 3/37 (4 overs)

India won by 24 runs
Daren Sammy Cricket Ground, Gros Islet
Umpires: Richard Illingworth (Eng) and Richard Kettleborough (Eng)
Player of the match: Rohit Sharma (Ind)

- Australia won the toss and elected to field.
- Rohit Sharma (Ind) became the first player to hit 200 sixes in T20Is.
- India qualified for the semi-finals as a result of this match.

== See also ==
- 2007 Cricket World Cup
- Windward Islands cricket team
- List of Test cricket grounds
