= Choiseul District =

- District
- Location of Choiseul District within Saint Lucia
- Coordinates (Town of Choiseul): 13°47′N 61°02′W
- Country: St. Lucia

Area
  - Land: 31 km^{2} (12 sq mi)

Population (2010)
  - Total: 6,130
  - Density: 197.75/km^{2} (512.2/sq mi)
- ISO 3166-2:LC: LC-03

Choiseul District is one of the 10 districts (formerly called quarter) of the Caribbean island nation of Saint Lucia. Located on the southwestern side of the island, the district is home to 6,130 people, according to the 2019 census. The seat of Choiseul District is the town of Choiseul.

== History ==
The Choiseul District/Quarter was originally known as Anse Citron, and an independent parish was established in 1765. In 1769 a census was done and recorded 75 whites, 25 free coloured, 512 negroes and 69 estates in Choiseul. However, most activity was originally in the River Dorée area, south-east of Choiseul.

An Anglican church at River Dorée was built in 1846 and the first school was opened in 1848. The area was primarily run by English plantation owners and by the end of the 19th century the population was approximately 4,000.

A Catholic church was built in Choiseul village at the end of the 19th century by Father Pierre Prudent René. It took several years to build and by 1914 the church was completed.

The main city of the district goes by the same name, and is home to the indigenous craft of coal pot manufacturing on the island and many local arts and crafts can be purchased at the roadside craft market, including grass place mats, market chairs, and local clay products; such as coal pots which are still widely used in many St. Lucian kitchens.

== Government ==
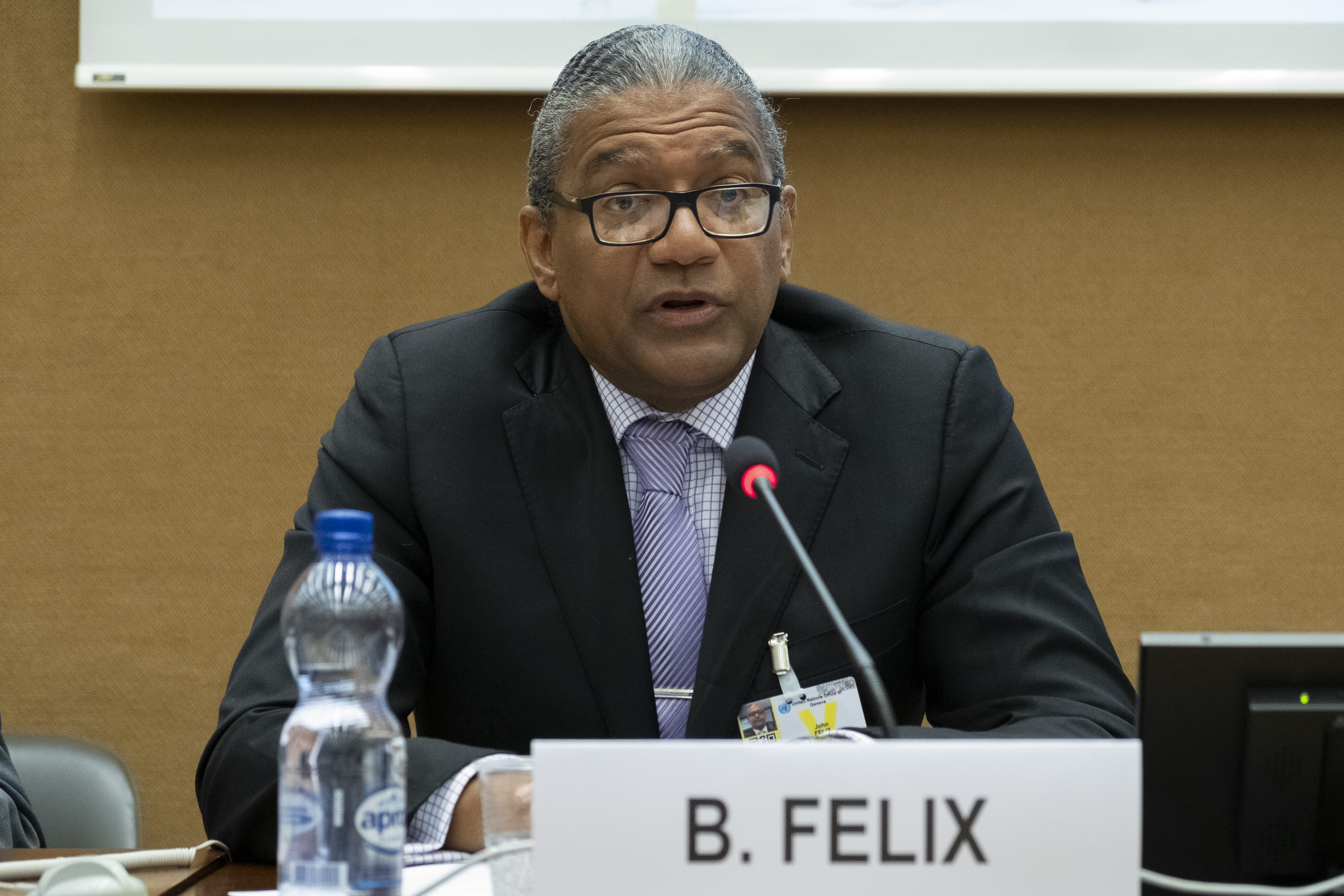
Current Representative for Choiseul - Bradley Felix

The Choiseul District is an electoral district represented in the House of Assembly of Saint Lucia. The district has been represented since July 2021 by Bradley Felix as the Parliamentary Representative. The district elected their representative during the countries recent general election.

== Local attractions ==
The following are some of the local attractions in the Choiseul District:

- Anse l'Ivrogne Beach. The beach is regarded as one of the best sites for scuba diving in Saint Lucia, and is known as "the Black Hole" because of the underwater drop of 600m. Anse l'Ivrogne is located at the foot of Gros Piton. (Anse l'Ivrogne: 13°47′55″N 61°04′11″W)
- Balembouche Estate. This is a former sugar plantation set in 70 acres (280,000 m^{2}) near the coast East of Choiseul. There are ruined sugar mills and today it is a heritage site as well as an organic farm. (13°45′27″N 61°01′38″W)
- Choiseul, Saint Lucia. An arts and craft town. (13°46′28″N 61°03′02″W)
- Morne Sion Windmills. Three windmills were built by the British in the early 19th Century to crush sugar cane for the production of rum as well as granulated sugar. (Morne Sion: 13°47′13″N 61°03′23″W)
- La Pointe Beach. (13°47′23″N 61°04′03″W)
- Pon George (Devil's Bridge). This is a bridge spanning a 60m deep ravine in the River Dorée area. Legend has it that the Devil wanted the soul of the first living thing to cross the bridge, so an enterprising local sent a dog over to cheat him. (River Dorée: 13°45′49″N 61°02′11″W)
- Reunion Estate: Agricultural research station. (13°46′36″N 61°02′42″W)
- Sabwesha Beach. This is a black sand beach just north of Choiseul with views of Gros Piton as well as views of the neighbouring island of Saint Vincent. (Sabwesha beach: 13°46′49″N 61°03′17″W, Choiseul Bay: 13°46′31″N 61°03′10″W)
- Saltibus Waterfall Trail. North of Choiseul, near the village of Saltibus is a rainforest trail leading to Saltibus Waterfall. This is a series of five waterfalls with heights from 3 to 10 metres. (Saltibus: 13°48′34″N 61°00′40″W)

== Government ==
The seat of the Choiseul District government is in the town of Choiseul. There are 39 second-order administrative divisions in the Choiseul District.

The Choiseul District is also an electoral constituency and has been represented since 2021 in the House of Assembly of Saint Lucia by Bradley Felix, Parliamentary Representative for the Choiseul electoral constituency.

== Elections ==
2025 general election: Choiseul
Party	Candidate	Votes	%
Labour Party	Keithson Charles	2,941	53.9
UWP	John Bradley Felix	2,517	46.1
Majority		424	7.8
Turnout		5,705	59.81
Registered electors		9,539	
