= Sans Souci, KwaZulu-Natal =

Sans Souci
- Location within KwaZulu-Natal Location within South Africa
- Coordinates: 29°11′17″S 31°20′37″E
- Country: South Africa
- Province: KwaZulu-Natal
- District: iLembe
- Municipality: KwaDukuza

Area
  - Total: 2.29 km^{2} (0.88 sq mi)

Population (2011)
  - Total: 836
  - Density: 365/km^{2} (946/sq mi)

Racial makeup (2011)
  - Black African: 91.3%
  - Coloured: 3.3%
  - Indian/Asian: 5.0%
  - White: 0.2%
  - Other: 0.1%

First languages (2011)
  - Zulu: 90.6%
  - English: 6.9%
  - Xhosa: 1.2%
  - Other: 1.3%
- Time zone: UTC+2 (SAST)

Sans Souci is a village located on the right bank of the Lower Tugela river, in KwaZulu-Natal, South Africa. The name is originally French and means without worries; it shares this name with the nearby farm of Sans Souci. Not much is known about its history, however a school existed as far back as 1893.

== Notable residents ==
- Allison George Champion, member of the ANC, he was born in Sans Souci in 1893.
