= Soucis =

Settlement on Saint Lucia

Coordinates: 13.976°N 61°W

Soucis is a rural settlement in Castries District, Saint Lucia; it is located on the western side of the island c. 3.7 kilometres (2.3 mi) south of the capital, Castries. In the 2022 census, it had a population of 217.
