= Gros Islet =

- Town
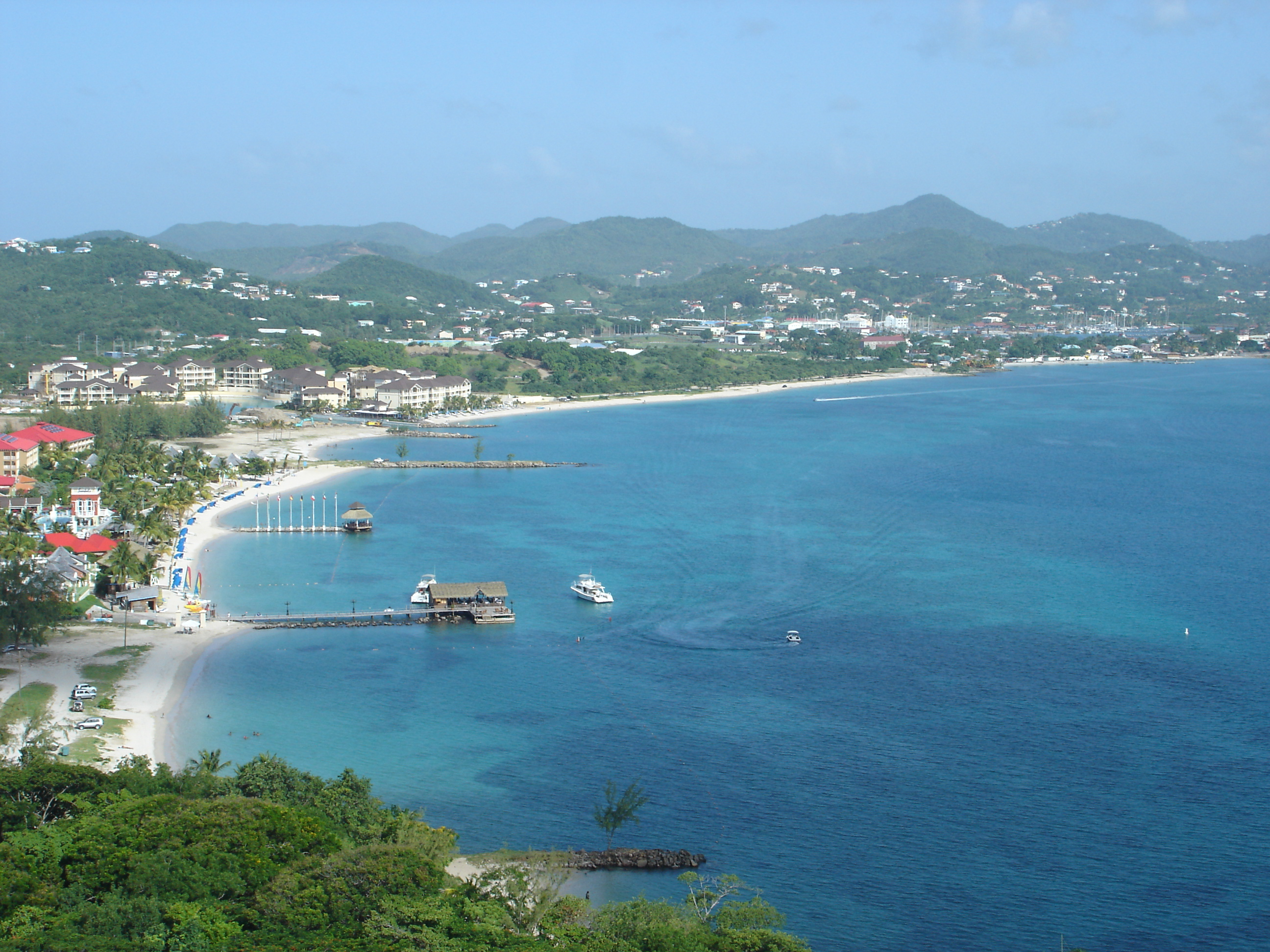
- Gros Islet and Rodney Bay as seen from Pigeon Island

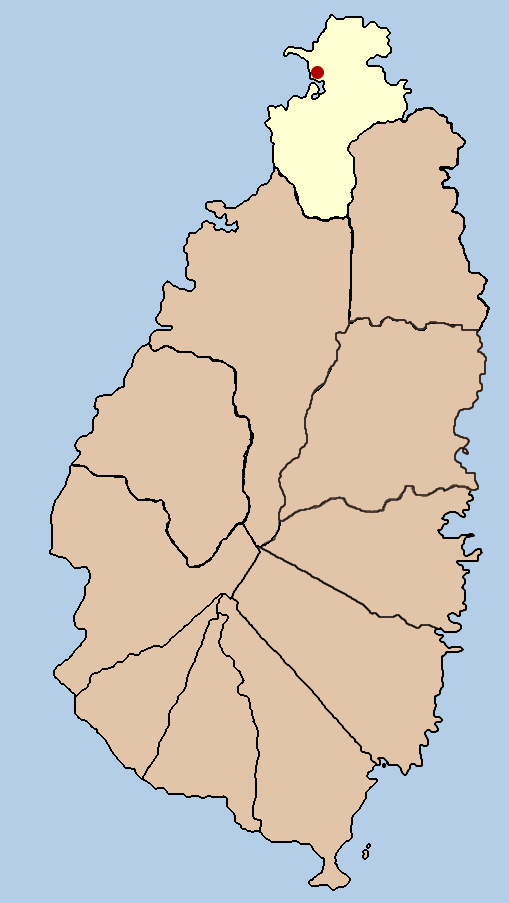
- The District of Gros Islet, with the town of Gros Islet marked in red
- Coordinates: 14°04′51″N 60°57′09″W
- Country: Saint Lucia
- Quarter: Gros Islet Quarter
- Founded: 1749?
- Founder: France

Government
  - Governing body: Gros Islet Town Council

Area
  - Total: 101.528 km^{2} (39.200 sq mi)
- Elevation: 2 m (6.6 ft)

Population (2005)
  - Total: 21,660 (Gros Islet District)
- Time zone: UTC-4 (Eastern Caribbean Time Zone (ECT))
- Area code: 758

Gros Islet (lit. 'Large Island') is a community near the northern tip of the island country of Saint Lucia, in the Gros Islet Quarter. Originally a quiet fishing village, it has become one of the more popular tourist destinations in the country.

== History ==
Originally settled by the Carib (and possibly Arawak), the area was first identified as Gros Islet in a French map from 1717. The community was a Roman Catholic parish, and the first priests who arrived on the island settled in the village in 1749.

In 1778, the Anglo-French War broke out between France and Great Britain. As part of the conflict, the British Royal Navy captured the island of Saint Lucia and built a naval base at Gros Islet Bay in 1782, temporarily changing the name to Fort Rodney. The island has changed hands between the British and French throughout its existence.

Between 1991 and 2001, the population rose 54%; the biggest increase in the country. In 2001, the population of Gros Islet was 19,409, making it the second-most populous community in Saint Lucia, up from 13,505 in the 1991 census and 10,164 in the 1980 census. Of that number, 9,307 were male and 10,102 were female.

A nearby mangrove swamp was dredged to form Rodney Bay Marina, and many hotels, resorts, and villas have since been built. However, the old village of Gros Islet is still a flourishing district.

In September 2011, the parliamentary representative for the area, the Honourable Lenard Montoute, advised that the constituency might become St. Lucia's second city, if the expansion plans for the area progress in accordance with its development blueprint.

== See also ==
- Daren Sammy Cricket Ground
