= Gros Islet District =

Gros Islet
- District
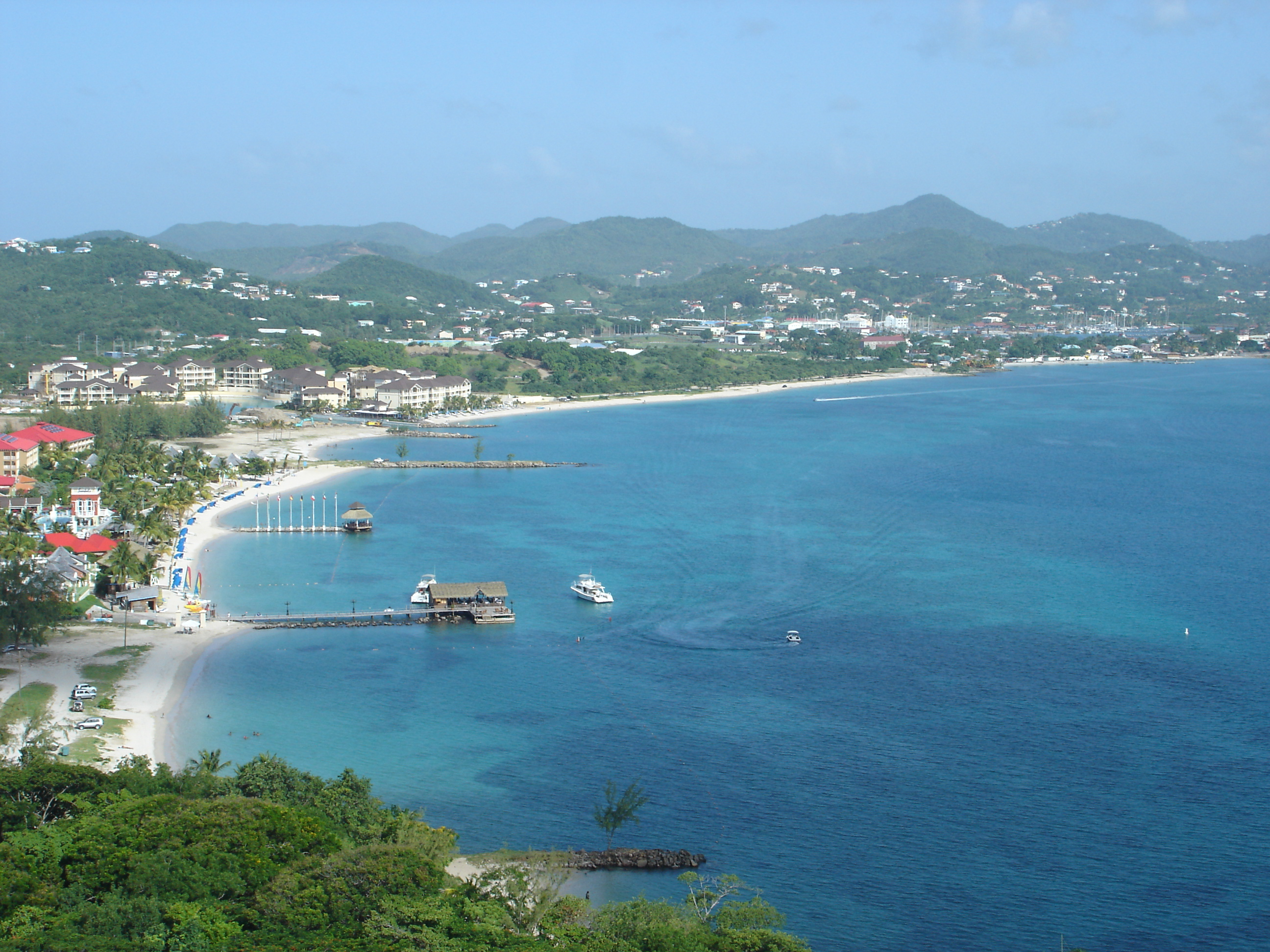
- Gros Islet from Pigeon Island

- Location of Gros Islet district within Saint Lucia
- Coordinates (Town of Gros Islet): 14°04′N 60°56′W
- Country: St. Lucia

Area
  - Total: 100.3 km^{2} (38.73 sq mi)

Population (2010)
  - Total: 20,872
  - Density: 100.3/km^{2} (260/sq mi)
- ISO 3166-2:LC: LC-06

Gros Islet District, one of 10 first order subdivision (districts, formerly quarters) of the Caribbean island nation of Saint Lucia which includes the island's northernmost point, Cap Point and the notable Cap Estate, where the renowned St. Lucia Golf and Country Club is located. Whilst the town of Gros Islet is an important administrative centre, Rodney Bay is the main financial center of the district.

== History ==
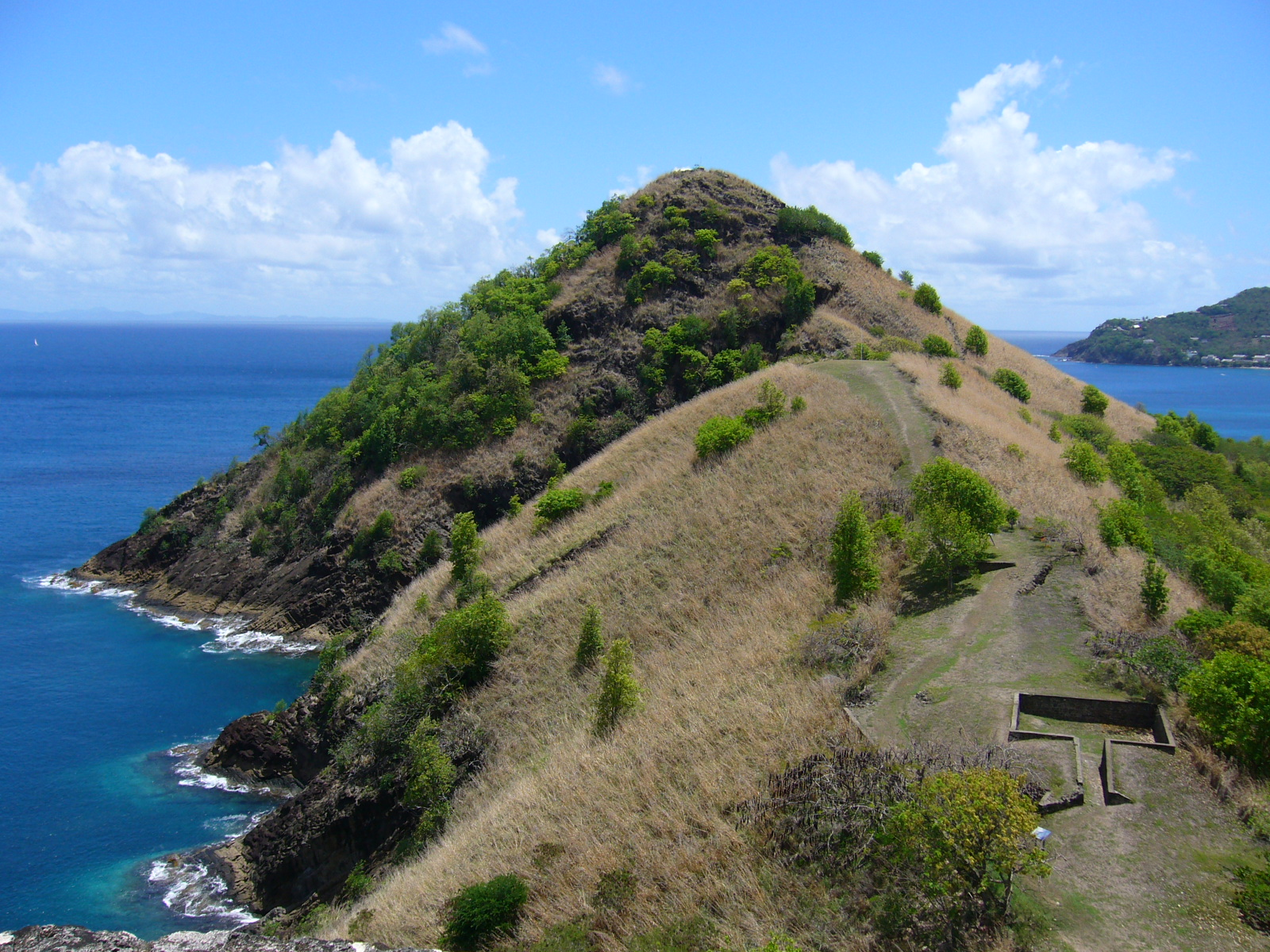
Pigeon Island

The Arawak and Carib artifacts found in Gros Islet District date back to around 1000 A.D.

The pirate François Le Clerc, nicknamed Jambe de Bois because of his wooden leg, used Pigeon Island as a base to attack Spanish ships in the 1550s. Peg-Leg Le Clerc was originally from Normandy and the first European to settle Saint Lucia.

Because of the good anchorage at Gros Islet harbor, early French and British sailing ships often anchored at this port city. The French established 47 plantations for producing sugar in Gros Islet by 1775. The Marquis de Bouille captured Gros Islet in 1793 before he was forced to retreat by George Brydges Rodney, 1st Baron Rodney from his base on Pigeon Island.

During World War II, 221 acres of land at Gros Islet were turned into a U.S. Naval Air Station with seaplanes. All that survives today are the concrete ramps used by the plane to come on land.

== Government ==
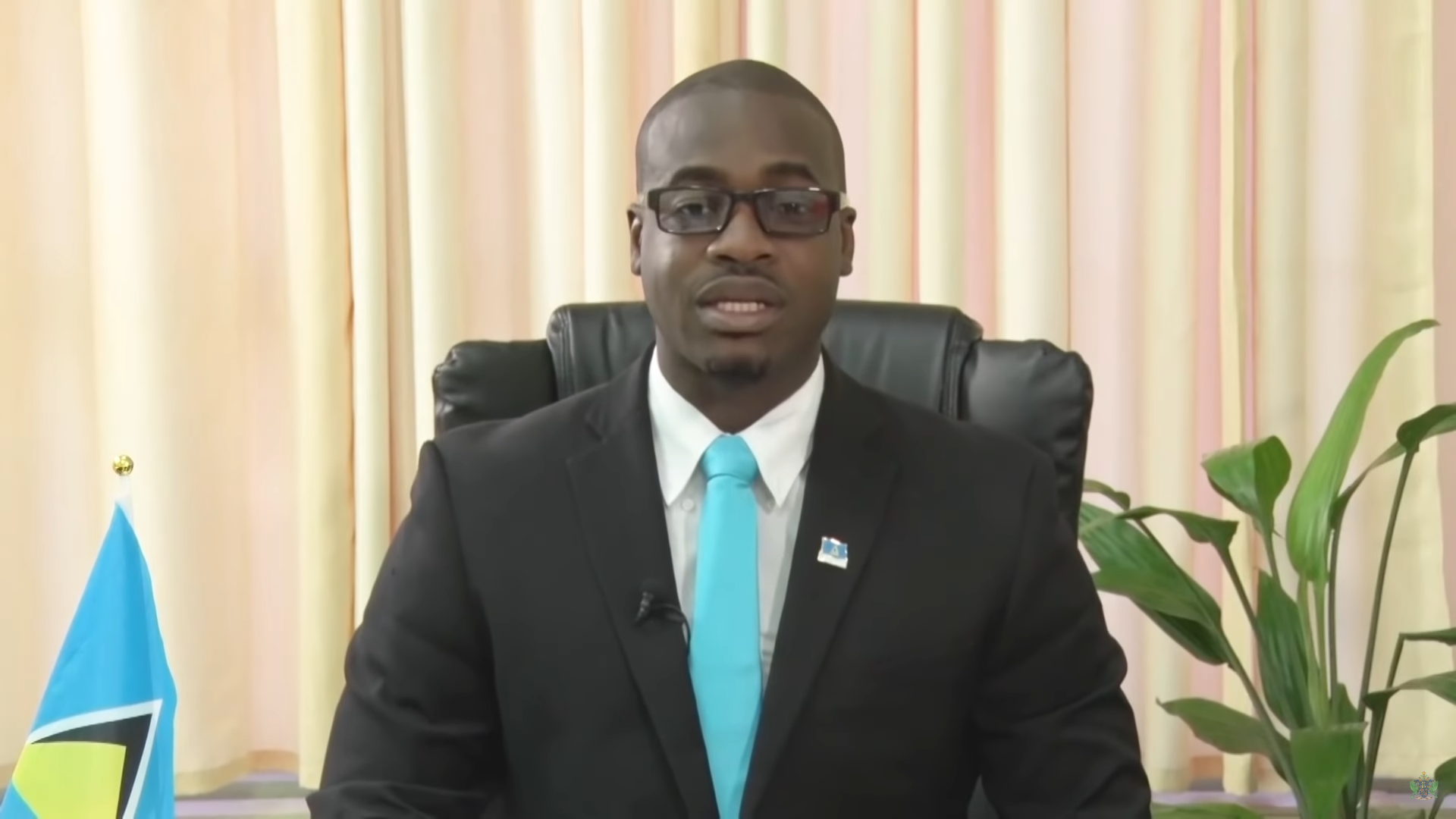
Current Representative for Gros Islet - Kenson Casimir

The Gros Islet District is an electoral constituency and has been represented since July 2021 in the House of Assembly of Saint Lucia by Kenson Casimir, Parliamentary Representative for the Gros Islet electoral constituency.

== Modern day events ==
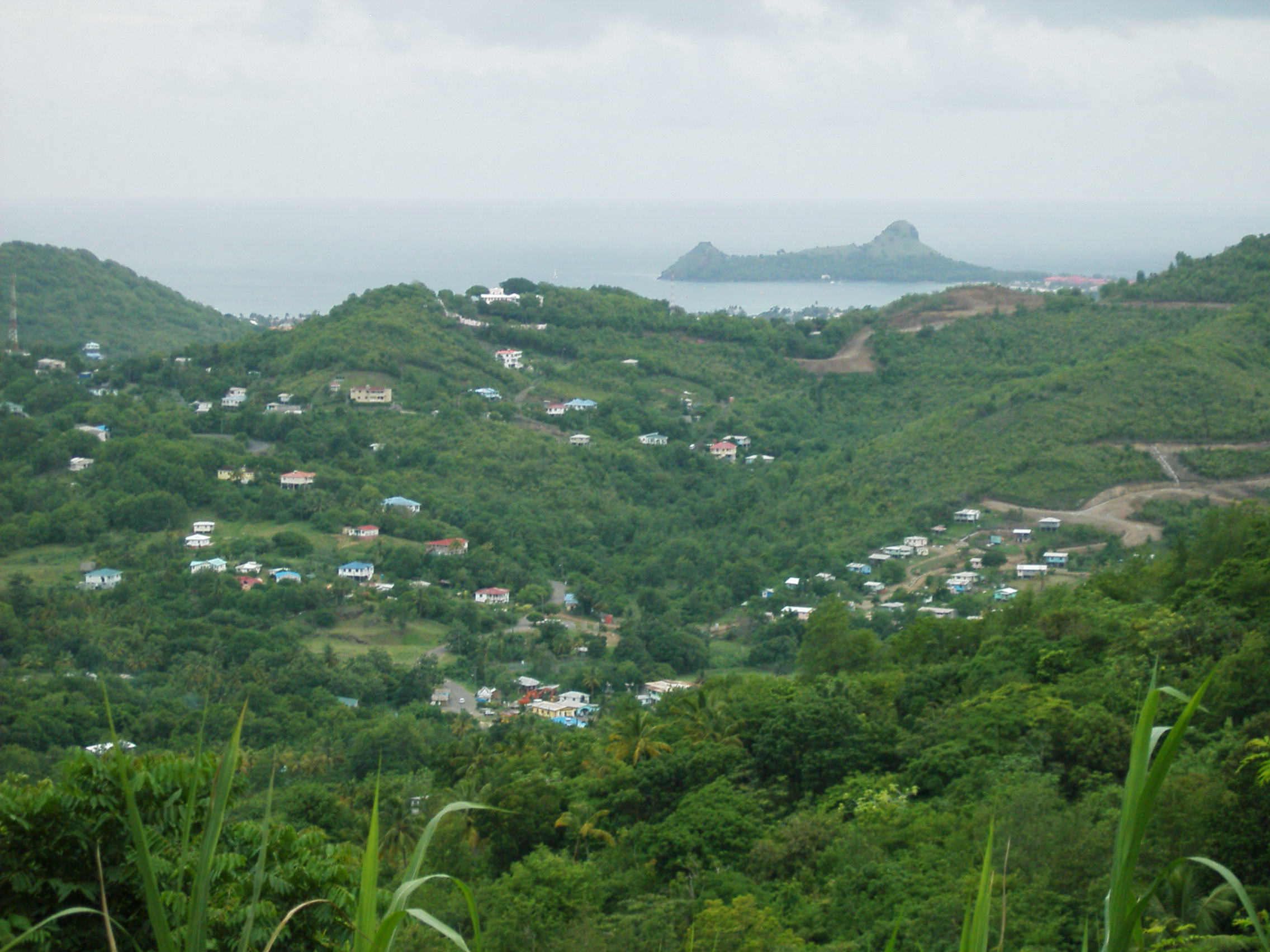
View of Gros Islet from Monchy

The town of Gros Islet lies north of Castries, the capital of Saint Lucia. Gros Islet is the newest town in Saint Lucia, having been promoted from a village to a town in 1985. It is the location of the Darren Sammy National Cricket Stadium where Twenty20 Internationals, One Day Internationals and Test Cricket are played. Parts of the 2007 Cricket World Cup, 2010 ICC World Twenty20 and 2024 ICC Men's T20 World Cup have been played there.

The town of Gros Islet features a Friday Night Street Party as its major tourist attraction. Also known as the jump-up, the Friday Night Street Party encompasses several blocks, which are informally cordoned off with the stalls of street vendors. Steamed fish, barbecue chicken and St. Lucia's own Piton beer can be purchased from these vendors. Locals and tourist both dance in a central cross section in the small streets to the sounds of calypso, zouk, reggae and R&B.

The Rodney Bay area further south differs greatly from the small, makeshift housing littering most of the town of Gros Islet. Catering mostly to the tourism populace, the areas surrounding the marina contain shops, malls, restaurants and night clubs that fall on the higher end of the spectrum compared to other local enterprises. Land development costs in Rodney Bay are extremely high. The exclusive beach front properties have almost all been purchased by small and large hoteliers, and restaurateurs, frustrating locals who continually see access to the public beaches being blocked by large construction projects.

The historic Pigeon Island is a popular place for tourists because of it peacefulness and wildlife. A man-made causeway connects it to the mainland.

== Sites of interest ==
The following sites of interest are in Gros Islet District:

- Amerec (town), 14°01′18″N 60°55′52″W
- American International Medical University, 14°04′39″N 60°56′23″W
- Bon Air (town), 14°02′54″N 60°58′10″W
- Bois d’Orange (town), 14°03′14″N 60°58′00″W
- Bois d'Orange River, 14°03′56″N 60°57′59″W
- Bois Verrelle (town), 14°02′58″N 60°56′15″W
- Cas en Bas (town), 14°05′00″N 60°56′11″W
- Des Bollières (town), 13°59′44″N 60°55′45″W
- La Borne (town), 14°02′53″N 60°55′35″W
- Calle Des (town), 13°58′56″N 60°53′23″W
- Cap Estate (town), 14°05′58″N 60°56′36″W
- Carrefe (town), 14°03′23″N 60°56′58″W
- Choc (town), 14°01′53″N 60°58′10″W
- Choc Bay, 14°02′26″N 60°58′28″W
- Daren Sammy Cricket Ground, 14°04′14.00″N 60°55′53.95″W
- Dauphin (town), 14°02′21″N 60°54′19″W
- Daupin River, 14°02′24″N 60°53′46″W (mouth)
- Desbarra (town), 13°59′36″N 60°54′32″W
- Espérance Harbour (bay), 14°03′58″N 60°54′32″W
- Esperance River, 14°03′N 60°54′W
- Fourreur Island, 14°04′16″N 60°58′42″W
- La Gare (town), 14°01′17″N 60°55′42″W
- Garrand (town), 14°00′24″N 60°55′53″W
- Grand Anse (town), 14°00′03″N 60°53′58″W
- Grande Rivière (town), 14°01′57″N 60°57′12″W
- L'Hermitage (town), 14°01′00″N 60°55′00″W
- Louvet River, 13°58′N 60°53′W
- Marisule Estate (town), 14°02′44″N 60°58′08″W
- Marquis (town), 14°01′33″N 60°54′40″W
- Massade Estate (town), 14.07975°N 60.94474°W
- Monchy (town), 14°03′11″N 60°55′48″W
- Marquis River (Saint Lucia), 14°01′52″N 60°53′44″W
- Monier (town), 14°01′24″N 60°56′16″W
- Moulin à Vent, 14°03′39″N 60°56′52″W
- Mount Gaïac, 14°03′04″N 60°54′17″W
- Paix Bouche (town), 14°01′08″N 60°56′19″W
- Pays Perdu (town), 14°00′13″N 60°56′02″W
- Pigeon Island, 14°05′34″N 60°57′53″W
- Plateau (town), 14°01′40″N 60°56′05″W
- Réduit (town), 14°04′07″N 60°57′17″W
- La Rivière Mitan (town), 14°03′12″N 60°56′20″W
- Rodney Bay (town and bay), 14°04′07″N 60°56′50″W
- St. Joseph the Worker Church, Gros Islet, 14°04′55″N 60°57′10″W
- Theatiste (town), 14°00′55″N 60°55′21″W
- Union (town), 14°02′00″N 60°58′00″W
- Upper Bonne Terre (town), 14°02′34″N 60°58′05″W
