= Castries District =

- District
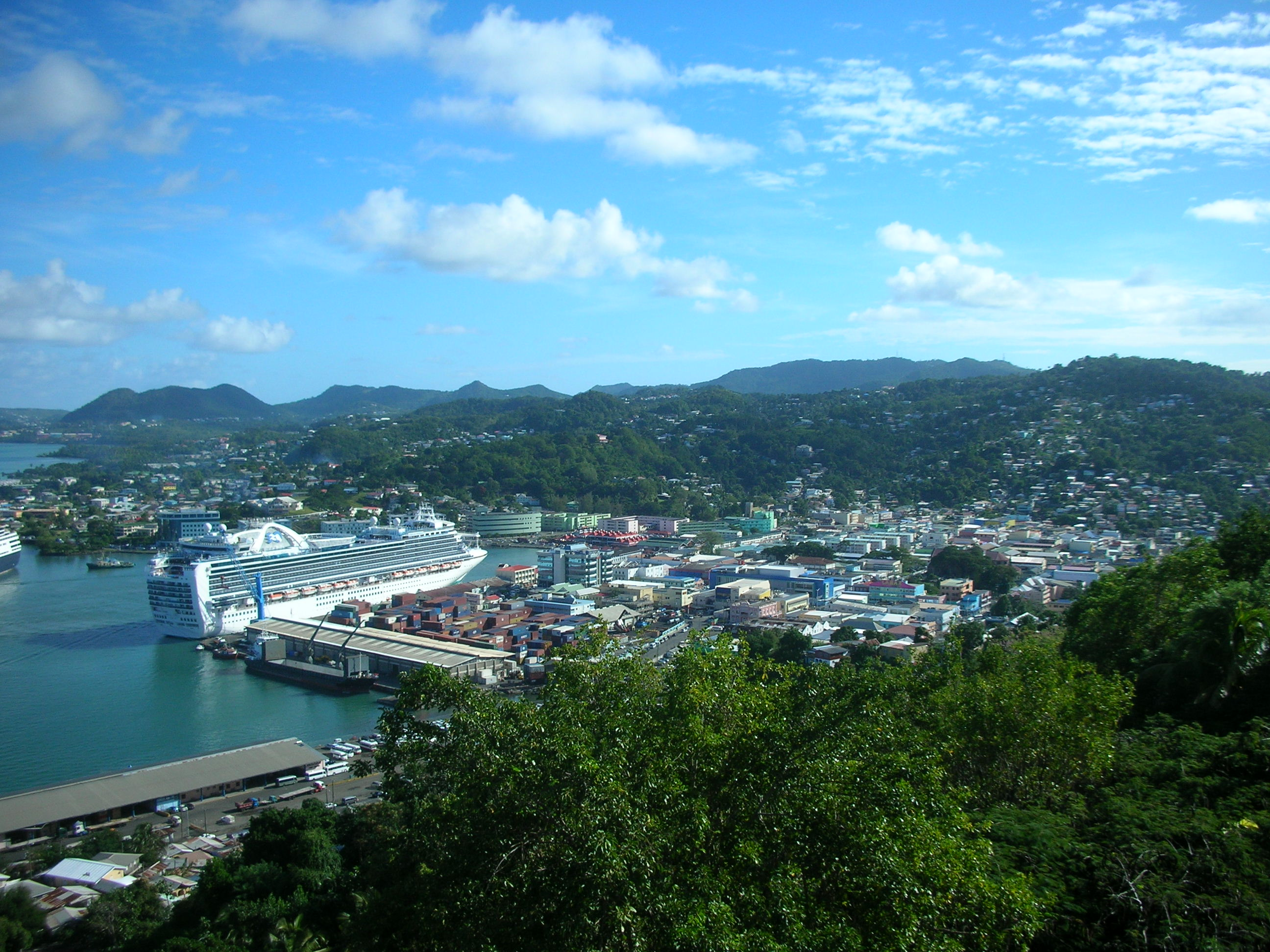
- Port of Castries

- Location of Castries District within Saint Lucia
- Coordinates (Town of Castries): 13°59′17″N 60°58′25″W
- Country: St. Lucia

Area
  - Land: 90.33 km^{2} (34.88 sq mi)

Population (2010)
  - Total: 65,656
  - Density: 726.85/km^{2} (1,882.5/sq mi)
- ISO 3166-2:LC: LC-02

Castries District is one of 10 districts (formerly called quarters) of the Caribbean island nation of Saint Lucia. According to the 2012 census, the population of the district was 80,573, having shown a slow but steady increase over the past ten years. The capital of Saint Lucia, the city of Castries, is located in this district. During the Saint Lucia Jazz Festival, the city of Castries plays host to several stages.

== Geography ==
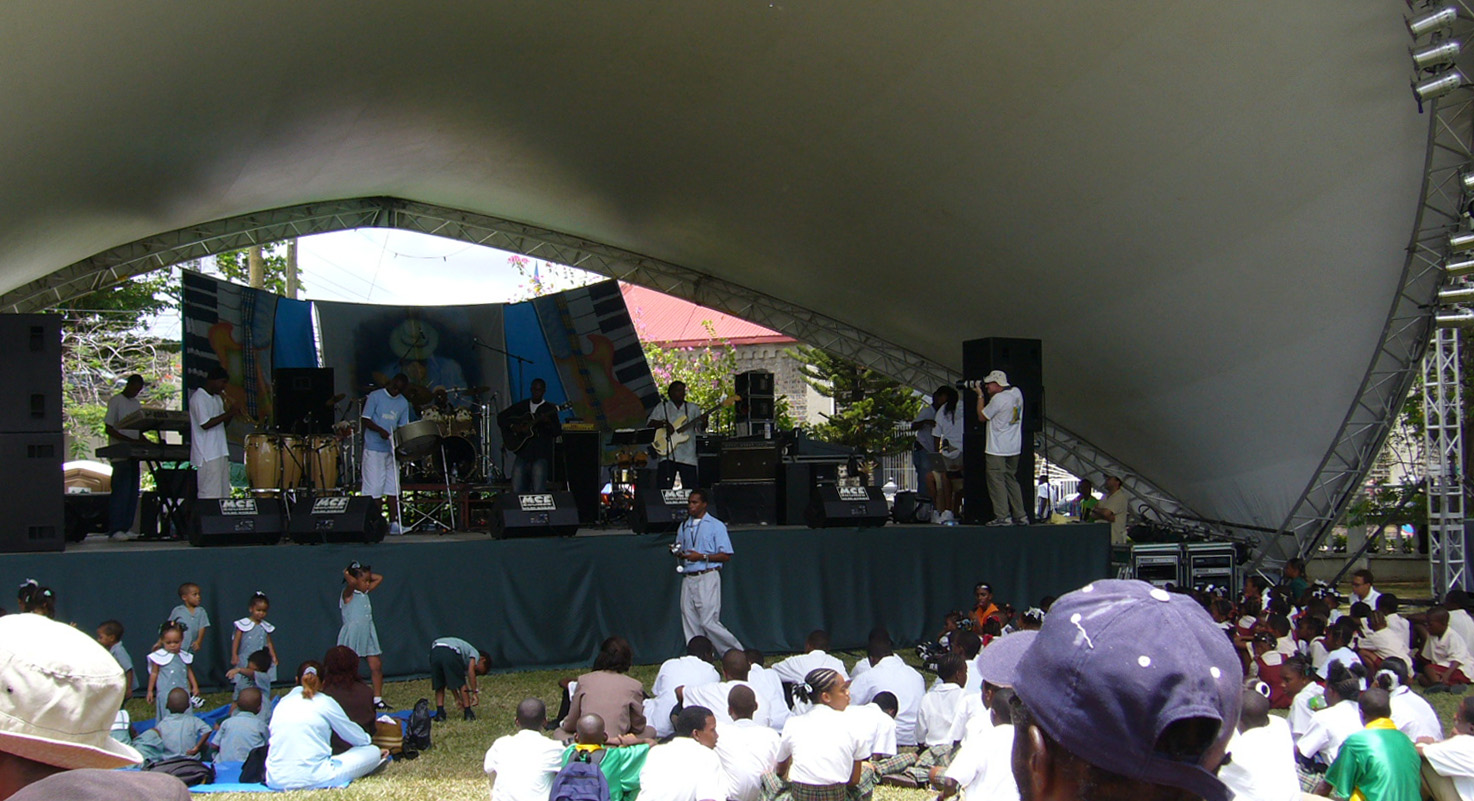
Castries Jazz Festival in Castries, Saint Lucia

There are 123 second-order administrative divisions in the Castries District.

The town of Castries is a port city. Shoppers flock to the city's dozens of stores and to Castries Market for fruits, vegetables and handicrafts. Sightseers admire murals painted by a local artist inside Cathedral of the Immaculate Conception, and relax in Derek Walcott Square, named for the St. Lucian Nobel Prize–winning poet. Atop Morne Fortune (Hill of Good Luck) – where the French and English battled over control of the island – visitors take in panoramic vistas.

Castries is home to some of the most popular resorts on island, including The BodyHoliday LeSport, Rendezvous Couples Resort, Windjammer Landing, Sandals Resorts, and more.

== Government ==
The seat of the Castries District government is the town of Castries.

The Castries District is divided into the following electoral constituencies represented in the House of Assembly of Saint Lucia:

- Babonneau, population 12,844, Hon. Dr. Virginia Albert-Poyotte
- Castries East, population 11782, Hon. Philip J. Pierre
- Castries South, population 9463, Hon. Dr. Ernest Hilaire
- Castries Central, population 7274, Hon. Richard Frederick
- Castries South East, population 14516, Hon. Joachim Andre Henry
- Castries North, population 11463, Hon. Stephenson King

== See also ==
- Districts of Saint Lucia
- Geography of Saint Lucia
- List of cities in Saint Lucia
- List of rivers of Saint Lucia
- Politics of Saint Lucia

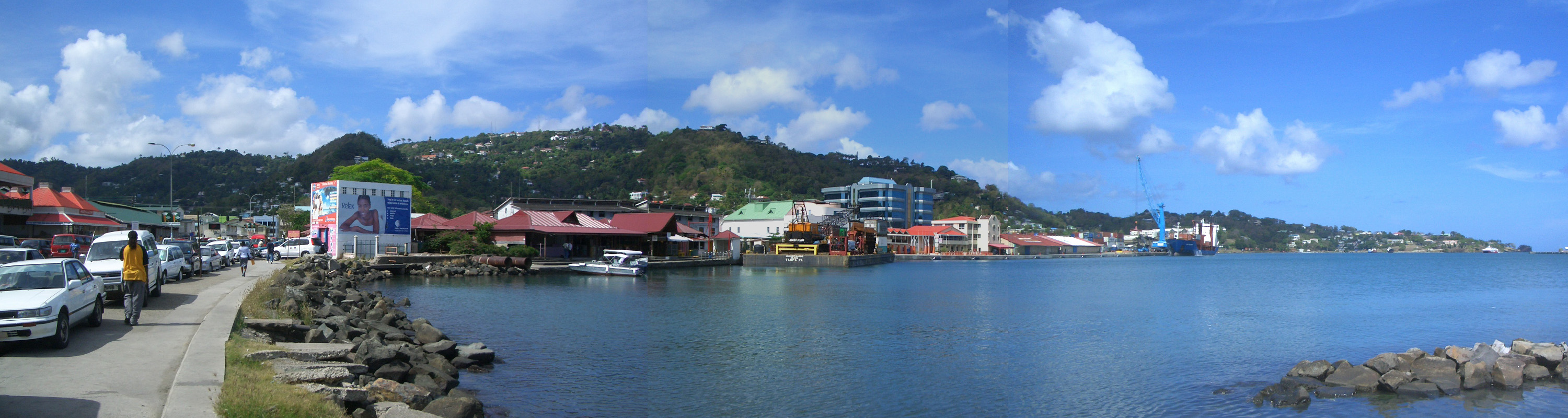
Panorama, coast of Castries
