= Districts of Saint Lucia =

First-level administrative divisions of Saint Lucia

Districts of Saint Lucia since at least 2001

The island nation of Saint Lucia is divided into 10 districts (formerly called Quarters). The name Quarters or Quartiers originally came from the French period in Saint Lucia (Sainte Lucie in French). The 2001 and 2010 Census of Saint Lucia refers to the first level administrative divisions as districts. The FIPS and ISO standards regularly called these divisions quarters or quartiers in French. The former district of Dauphin Quarter was merged into Gros Islet District and the former district of Praslin Quarter was merged into Micoud District.

== History ==
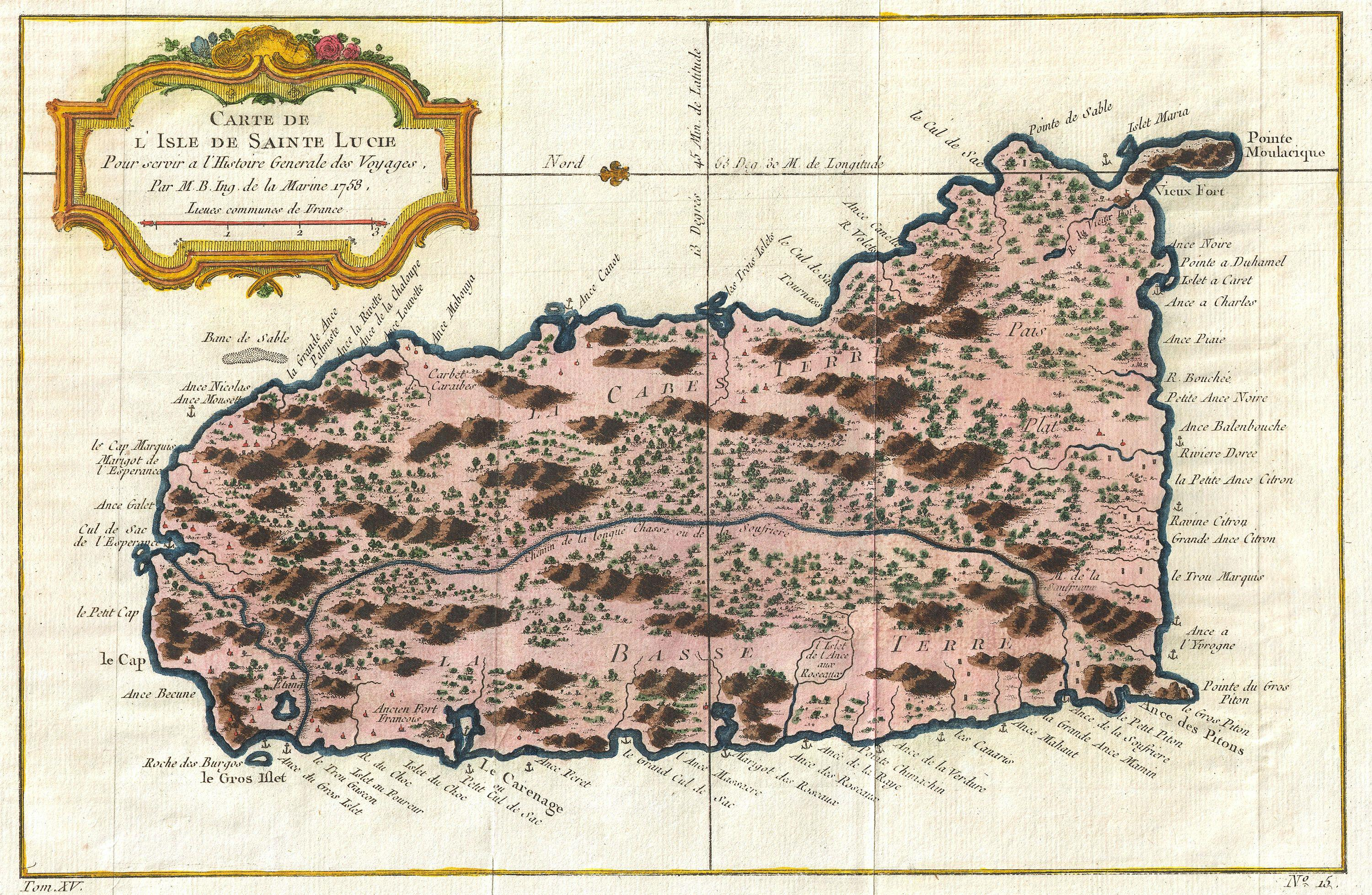
1758 map of Saint Lucia

After the French claimed title of Saint Lucia in 1744, commandant de Rougueville divided Saint Lucia into districts and parishes. Quarters were administrative districts for the control of settlers and slaves. The French Surveyor General of Saint Lucia, M. Raussaim, initially divided Saint Lucia into seven quarters.

In 1844, Henry Breen describes how Saint Lucia was divided into two districts, the eastern district on the leeward side of Saint Lucia facing the Atlantic Ocean and the western district on the windward side facing the Caribbean Sea. It was further divided into eleven quarters or parishes, i.e. Castries, Anse Laraye, Soufriere, Choiseul, Laborie, Vieux Fort, Micoud, Praslin, Dennery, Dauphin, and Gros-ilet. Each quarter or parish had a town in the coastal bay within its territory that was named the same as the quarter. Breen further talks about stipendiary magistrates introduced during the period of the apprenticeship system. These magistrates were as follows:

1. Castries, Gros-ilet, Daughpin, and Anse Laraye
2. Soufriere, Choiseul, Laborie
3. Vieux Fort, Micoud, Praslin, Dennery

Still later the number of stipendiary magistrates was increased to five:

1. Castries and Anse Laray
2. Gros-ilet and Sauphin
3. Soufriere and Choiseul
4. Vieux Fort and Laborie
5. Micoud, Dennery, and Praslin

The magistrates did not survive. However, the quarters or parishes did survive, as such, with some mergers and changes in the names.

== Districts ==
Since the 2001 Census of Saint Lucia there have been 10 districts in Saint Lucia.

2010 Census Population and area of Saint Lucia Districts
| # | District | Population | Households | Land Area | Population density |
|---|---|---|---|---|---|
| 1 | Anse la Raye | 6,060 | 2,171 | 37.6 km^{2} (14.52 mi^{2}) | 161 per km2, 417 per mi2 |
| 2 | Canaries | 2,044 | 789 | 24.3 km^{2} (9.38 mi^{2}) | 84 per km2, 218 per mi2 |
| 3 | Castries | 65,656 | 23,296 | 102.7 km^{2} (39.65 mi^{2}) | 639 per km2, 1,656 per mi2 |
| 4 | Choiseul | 6,128 | 2,077 | 25.9 km^{2} (10.00 mi^{2}) | 237 per km2, 612 per mi2 |
| 5 | Dennery | 12,767 | 4,419 | 72.3 km^{2} (27.93 mi^{2}) | 177 per km2, 457 per mi2 |
| 6 | Gros Islet | 20,872 | 9,804 | 100.3 km^{2} (38.73 mi^{2}) | 208 per km2, 539 per mi2 |
| 7 | Laborie | 7,363 | 2,189 | 33.8 km^{2} (13.05 mi^{2}) | 218 per km2, 564 per mi2 |
| 8 | Micoud | 16,284 | 5,623 | 112.1 km^{2} (43.29 mi^{2}) | 145 per km2, 376 per mi2 |
| 9 | Soufrière | 7,657 | 2,886 | 58.4 km^{2} (22.55 mi^{2}) | 131 per km2, 340 per mi2 |
| 10 | Vieux Fort | 14,754 | 5,665 | 49.8 km^{2} (19.22 mi^{2}) | 296 per km2, 768 per mi2 |
| | Saint Lucia | 165,596 | 58,919 | 617.00 km^{2} (238.23 sq mi) | 268 per km2, 695 per mi2 |

=== Notes ===
| Dauphin Quarter | Praslin Quarter |

- A former quarter, Dauphin Quarter was merged into Gros Islet Quarter. It was not enumerated separately in the 2010 Census. The 2001 Census shows Daphin as part of Gros Islet.
- A former quarter, Praslin Quarter was merged into Micoud Quarter. It was not enumerated separately in the 2010 Census. The 2001 Census shows Praslin as part of Micoud District.
- The Central Forest Reserve with an area of 78 km^{2} (30 sq mi) was not included in the 2010 Census. Without this region, the area of Saint Lucia is 540 km^{2} (208 mi^{2}).
- The final population numbers are used in the table above. Preliminary results published in April 2011 were different.

== Political divisions ==
Electoral boundaries of Saint Lucia

Saint Lucia electoral boundaries are based, generally, on the districts. There are 17 constituencies in Saint Lucia that are represented in the House of Assembly of Saint Lucia. A study was done in 2014 to look into variations in census and boundaries and possible expansion of the number of constituencies.

| District | Constituency Name | Population |
|---|---|---|
| Gros Islet | Gros Islet | 23,242 |
| Castries | Babonneau | 12,844 |
| Castries | Castries East | 11,782 |
| Castries | Castries South | 9,463 |
| Castries | Castries Central | 7,742 |
| Castries | Castries South East | 14,516 |
| Castries | Castries North | 11,463 |
| Anse la Raye and Canaries | Anse la Raye and Canaries | 8,363 |
| Soufrière | Soufrière | 8,424 |
| Laborie | Laborie | 8,588 |
| Vieux Fort | Vieux Fort North | 7,201 |
| Vieux Fort | Vieux Fort South | 9,336 |
| Micoud | Micoud North | 7,173 |
| Micoud | Micoud South | 7,330 |
| Dennery | Dennery South | 4,896 |
| Dennery | Dennery North | 7,570 |
| Choiseul | Choiseul | 6,130 |

== See also ==
- Commonwealth Local Government Forum-Americas
- Geography of Saint Lucia
- House of Assembly of Saint Lucia
- ISO 3166-2:LC
- List of Caribbean First-level Subdivisions by Total Area
- List of cities in Saint Lucia
