= Tourism in Saint Lucia =

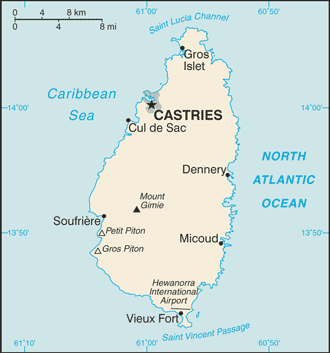
A map of Saint Lucia showing major cities

Saint Lucia, an island nation in the Caribbean islands, has a relatively large tourism industry. Due to the relatively small land area of the country, most of the governmental promotion is performed by the state-operated Saint Lucia Tourism Authority, led by Executive Chairperson Agnes.

Tourist arrivals of 2024 in %

== Area and location ==
Saint Lucia has an area of 239 square miles (619 sq. km.). It is located in the eastern Caribbean Sea, in the windward islands.

- Coordinates: 13°53′00″N 60°58′00″W
- Population: 183,627 (2023 est.) / World Rank: 189
- Capital City: Castries, Castries District, in northern Saint Lucia
- Largest City: Castries, population 53,000 (2000 est.)

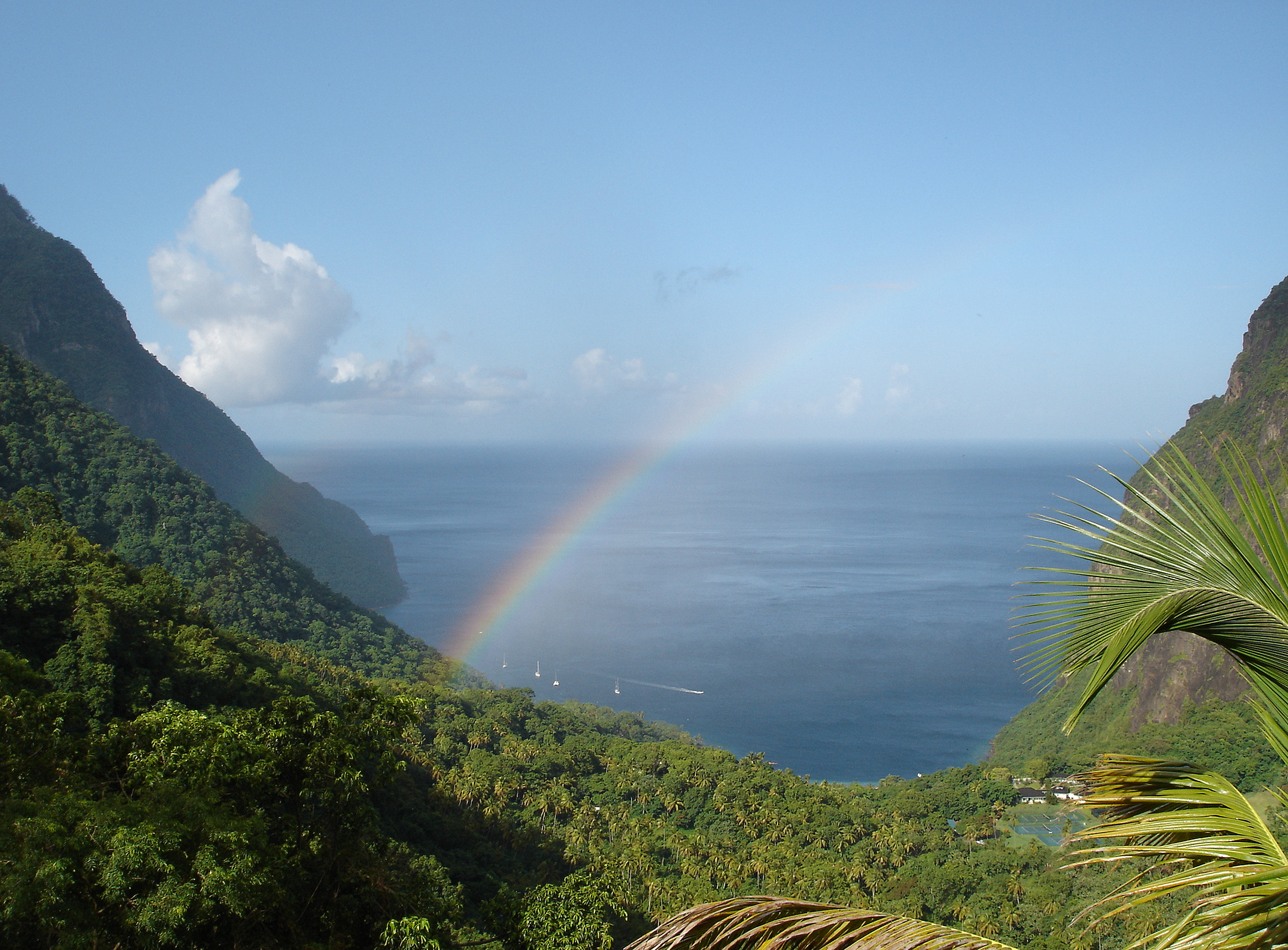
The valley between the two twin peaks, Petit Piton and Gros Piton, is a UNESCO World Heritage Site.

There are two international airports in Saint Lucia.

LOCATION	ICAO	IATA	Airport name	Coordinates
Castries	TLPC	SLU	George F. L. Charles Airport (formerly Vigie Airport)	14°01′13″N 060°59′35″W
Vieux-Fort	TLPL	UVF	Hewanorra International Airport	13°44′00″N 060°57′09″W

== Currency ==
Together with other states in the island chain, Saint Lucia is part of the Organisation of Eastern Caribbean States, whose Eastern Caribbean Central Bank is responsible for a currency union managing the Eastern Caribbean dollar (US$1 = EC$2.7).

== Tourism industry ==
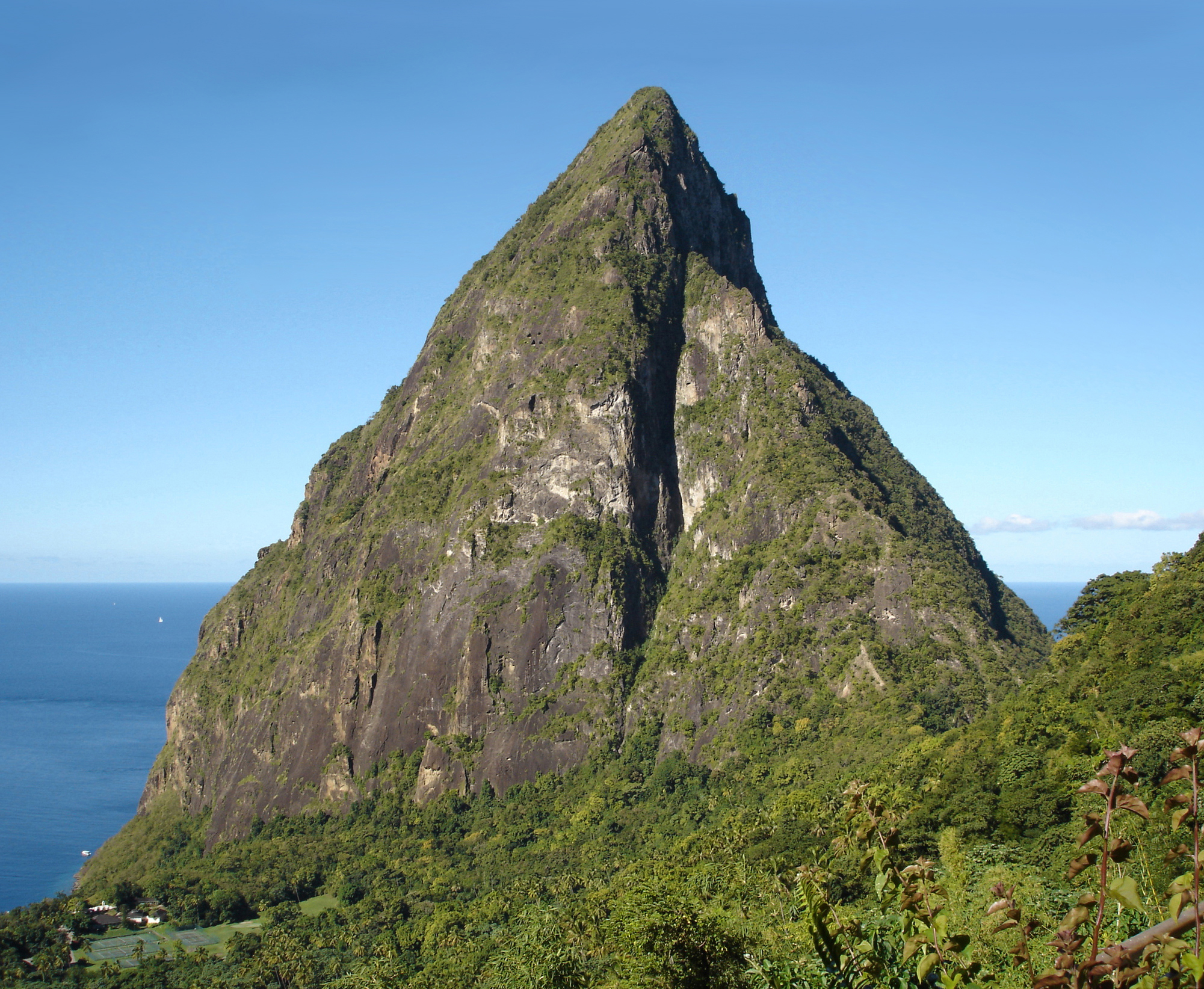
Petit Piton, seen from the Ladera Hotel restaurant.

Saint Lucia is a popular tourist destination due to its weather, scenery, and large number of beaches. The island dates back to British and French rule in the 18th century. It is also known for its cuisine, sports and activities.

=== Beaches ===
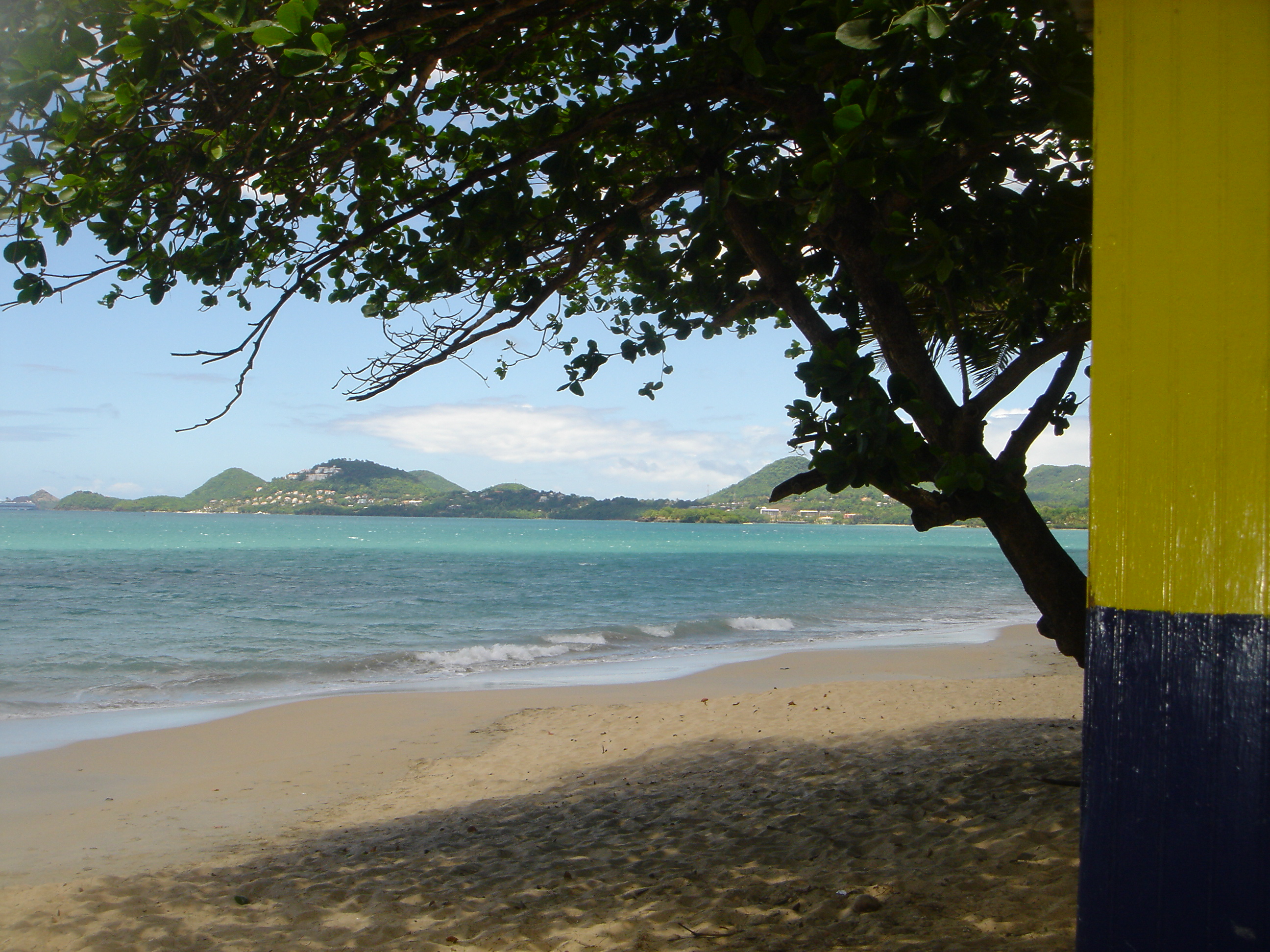
Vigie Beach

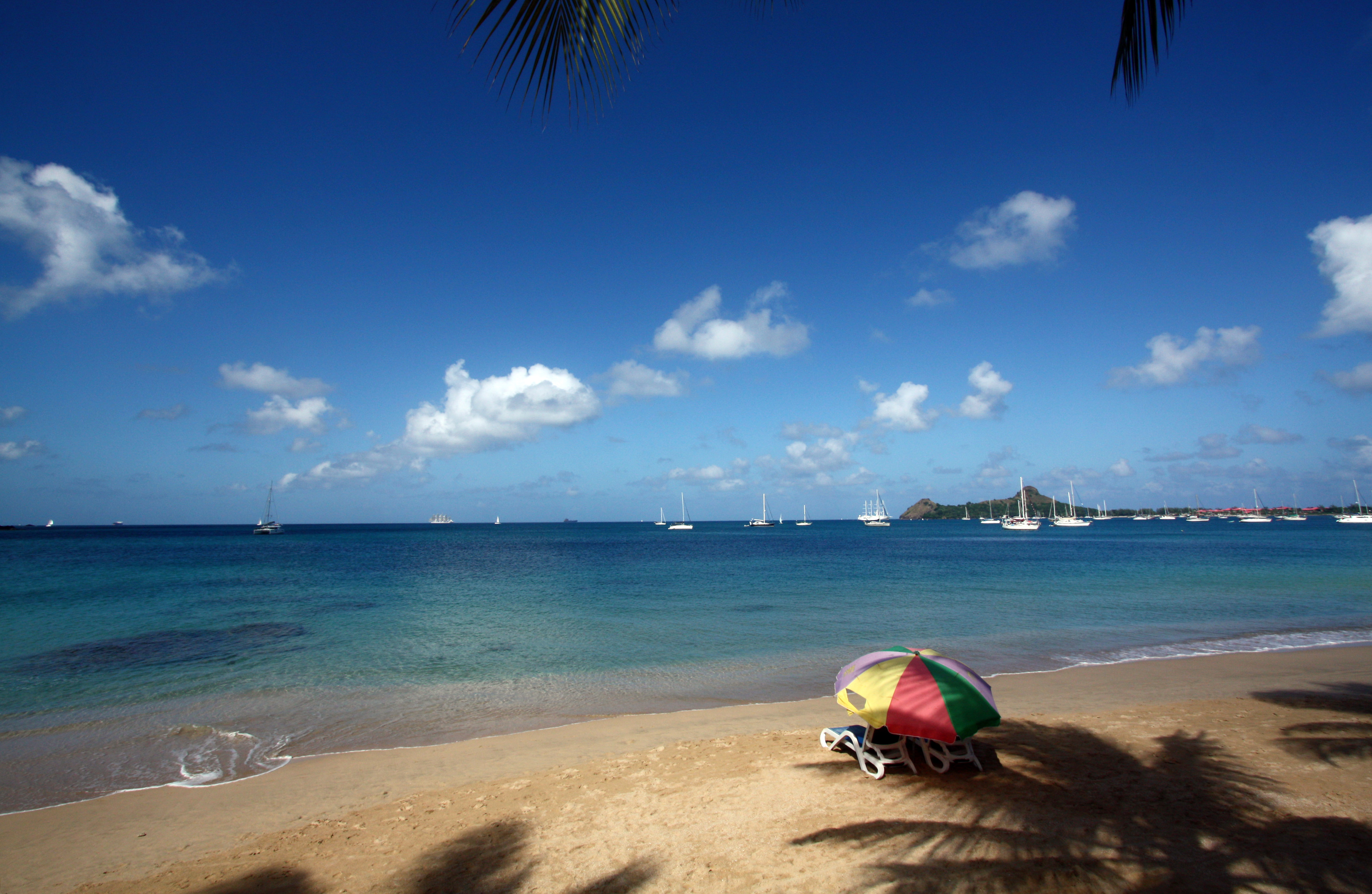
Reduit Beach

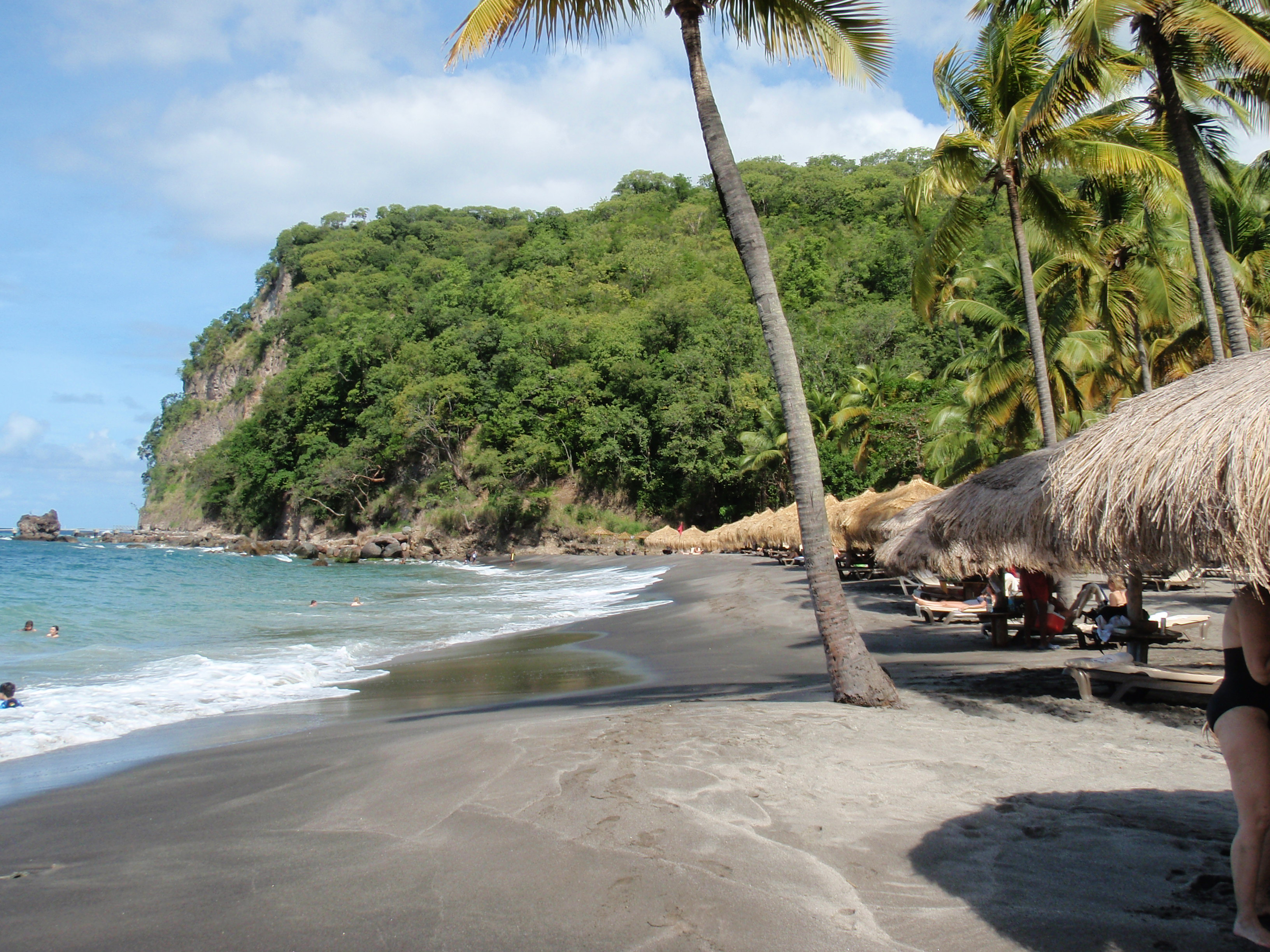
Anse Chastanet Beach

Saint Lucia is known for beaches, some of which are covered in black volcanic sand. The island's temperature averages 80°F (27°C) all year. The island offers many water sports, including snorkeling, jet skiing, and parasailing.

The following are some of the most popular and well-known beaches in the island nation of Saint Lucia:

- Anse Chastanet beach on Chastanet Bay in Soufrière District
- Anse Cochon beach on Cochon Bay in Canaries District
- Anse de Sables beach in Vieux Fort District
- Anse Louvet beach in Dennery District
- Anse Mamin on Anse Bay in Soufrière District
- Choc Beach in Castries District
- Grande Anse beach in Gros Islet District
- Kiwanies Beach in Castries District
- Laborie Bay in Laborie District
- Marigot Bay in Castries District
- Marisule Beach in Gros Islet District
- Pigeon Island beach in Gros Islet District
- La Pointe Beach in Choiseul District
- Reduit Beach, Rodney Bay in Gros Islet District
- La Toc Beach in Castries District
- Vigie Beach, near the George F. L. Charles Airport in Castries District
- Yellow Sands Beach in Castries District

=== Culture ===
The Caribbean islands have a distinct culture from music to food to art. The foods include exotic fruits and local meats and spices. Chefs on the island have many new flavors for tourists to try and experiment with. Music includes genres ranging from jazz to reggae. Musicians from around the world travel to the small island to attend and perform at festivals. The art encompasses everything from the craftsmanship of the furniture to the paintings and clay sculptures.

=== Weddings ===
A report published by American Express Travel in 2006 revealed that St. Lucia is the world's top destination for weddings. According to the report, St. Lucia beat famous destinations like Las Vegas and the Maldives.

=== Safety ===
St. Lucia, like many other Caribbean countries, has been experiencing an increase in serious crime over the past few years. There has been an increase in robberies, burglaries, harassment, and even incidents of violent crime against tourists. Some of these cases have been reported in the international media and as such, St. Lucia's destination image is at risk. In an attempt to control the crime problem, the government has implemented a number of measures, which includes tougher penalties for some crimes. However, these measures have not had a great effect on the crime rate. This has caused a noticeable decline in the tourist industry on the island.

In an attempt to combat crime against tourists, the Minister of Tourism has adopted a number of measures. In collaboration with the Royal St. Lucia Police Force, they have commissioned a team of Special Constables, who have powers of arrest. These Constables were placed into two groups: the Rapid Response Team and the Rangers. The Rapid Response Team performs both foot and mobile patrol in the tourist and hotel areas both in the north and south of the island. The Rangers also referred to as Beach Rangers, are responsible for patrolling the beaches near the hotels all over the island. By doing so the hope is to assure safety to the visitors on the islands. They also assist the hotel security by patrolling the hotel area.

Additionally, the prominent tourist sites located in Soufriere, such as the Drive-in Volcano, The Rain Forest, The Diamond Falls, and The Piton Heritage Site have private security officers, who have been hired by the Ministry of Tourism. The Port police also provide security to the tourists from the time they leave the cruise vessel until they return to the port area. They also ensure that the tourist boats are secure while in the port. This is done in collaboration with the Marine Police who constantly patrol the seaport area while the tourist boats are in the harbor. Whenever tourist boats come to the island, police patrols are normally increased in the area in order to ensure that the tourists are secure while on the island.

The Ministry of Tourism, in collaboration with the Royal St. Lucia Police, has also created a system of police audit checks on hotels. This system allows the police to carry out regular checks on security at the hotels around the island. They also advise the hotels on what security changes should be made in order to safeguard tourists. Tourists are still advised to be aware of any suspicious behavior and report anything immediately.

=== Other attractions ===
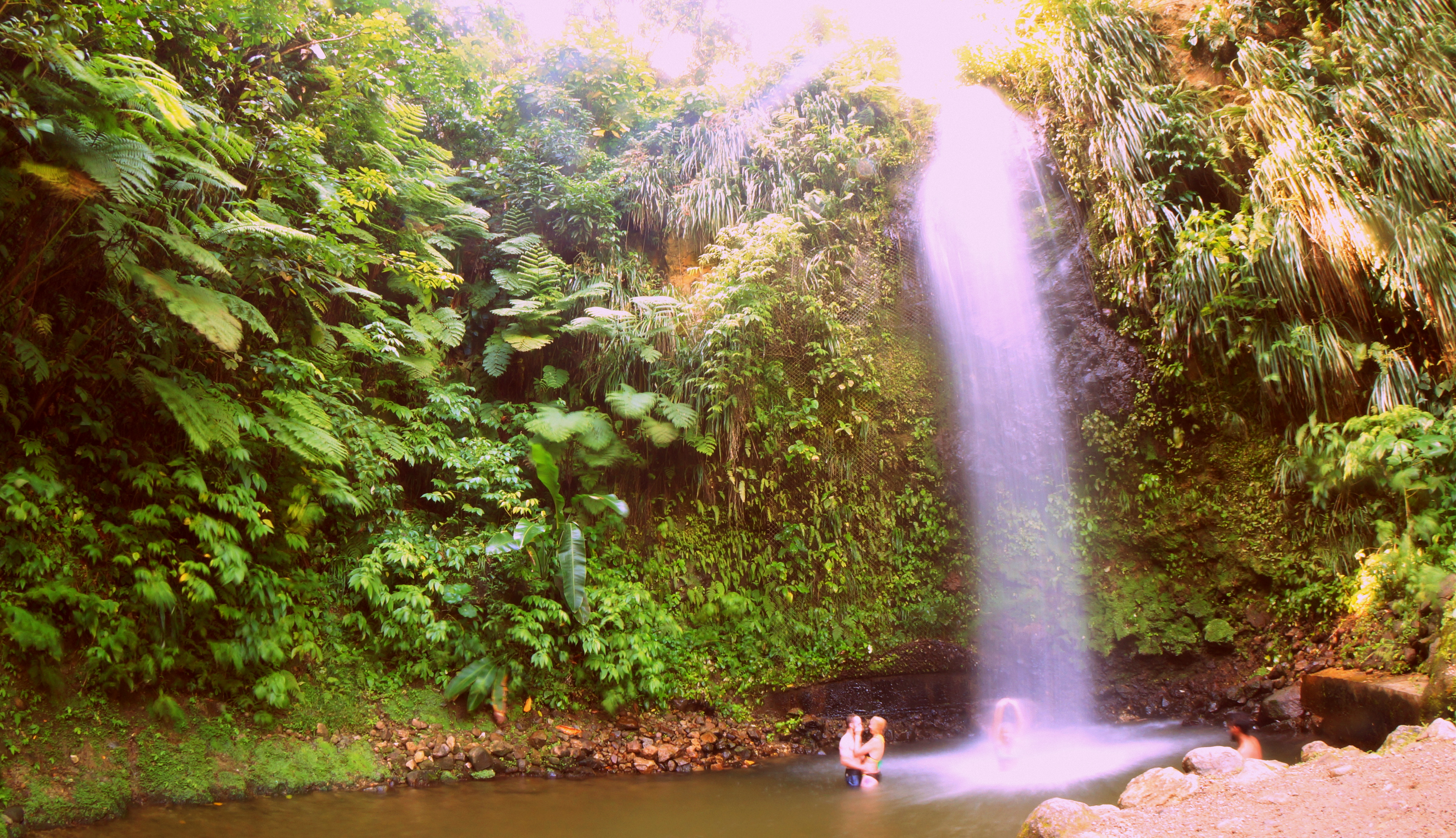
Toraille Waterfall

Saint Lucia, located in the eastern Caribbean Sea between Martinique and Saint Vincent, is the second-largest of the Windward Islands. The interior of the volcanically formed island consists of mountains and hills and is surrounded by a coastal strip. The cone-like twin peaks of the Gros Piton and Petit Piton are Saint Lucia's outstanding natural features. Although cruises and beaches are what draw most tourists to Saint Lucia, other attractions include:

- The Pitons, two volcanic plugs rising more than 700 m directly from the sea that form part of a UNESCO World Heritage Site.
- Sulphur Springs - Located in the Soufrière District, it is the world's only drive-in volcano.
- St. Lucia Botanical Gardens - This botanical garden has a wide variety of plant species, and a sulfur waterfall.
- Toraille Waterfall on the Ravine Toraille in Soufrière District.

== Major cities ==
Districts of Saint Lucia

There are 10 districts (formerly called quarters) in Saint Lucia. Each district has a city with the same name as the district that serves as the seat of the district government. Some of the cities that tourists are drawn to include:

- Castries, Castries District, population: 20,000
- Choisuel, Choiseul District, population: 346
- Gros Islet and Pigeon Island, Gros Islet District, population: 2,362
- Marigot Bay, Castries District, population: 799
- Soufrière, Soufrière District, population: 2,918

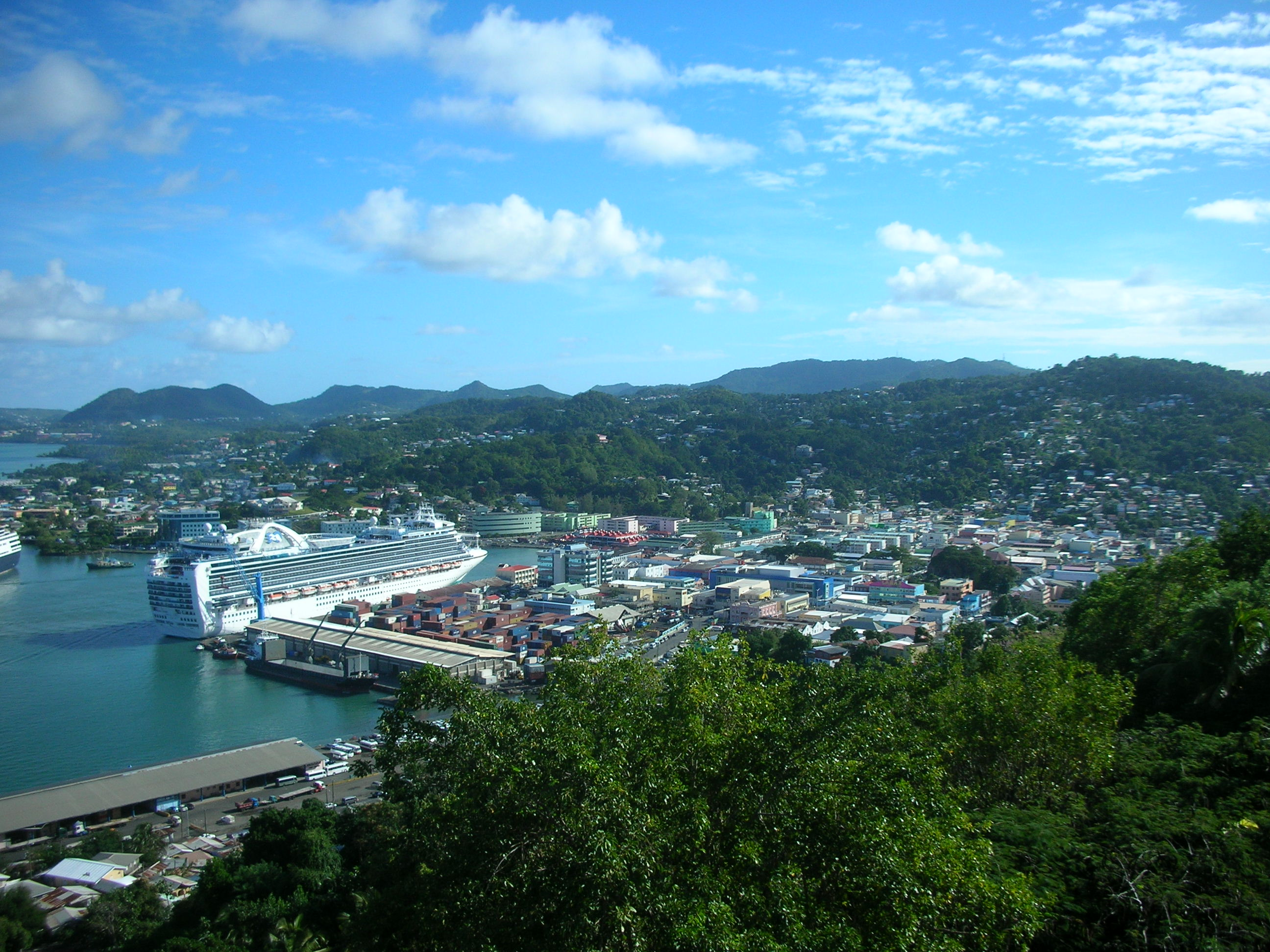
View of the capital city of Castries

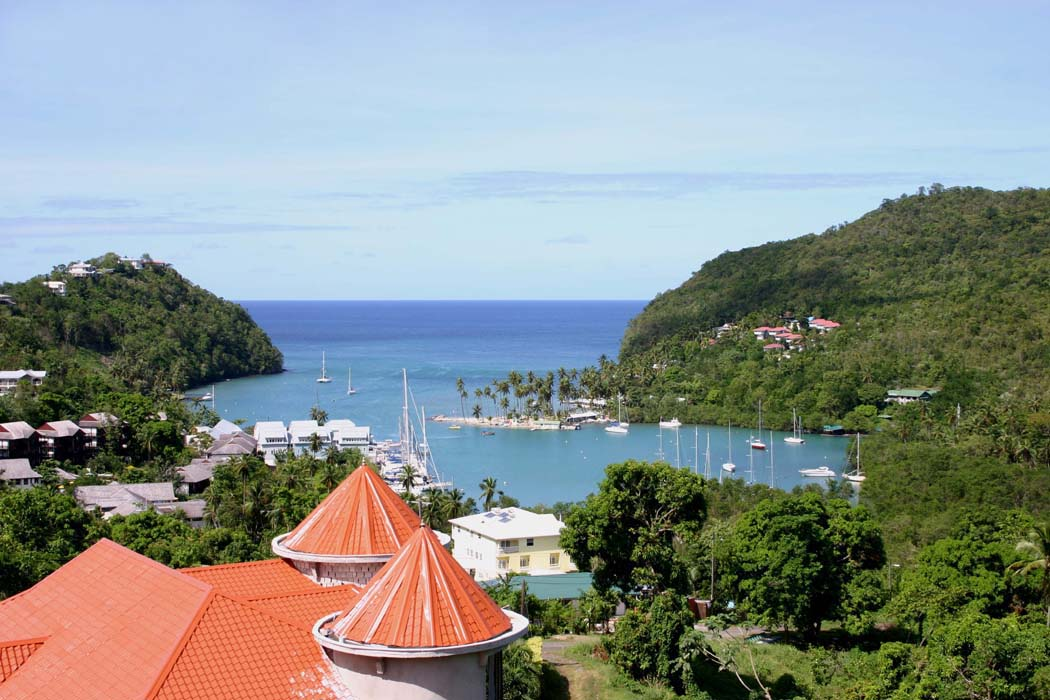
Marigot Bay

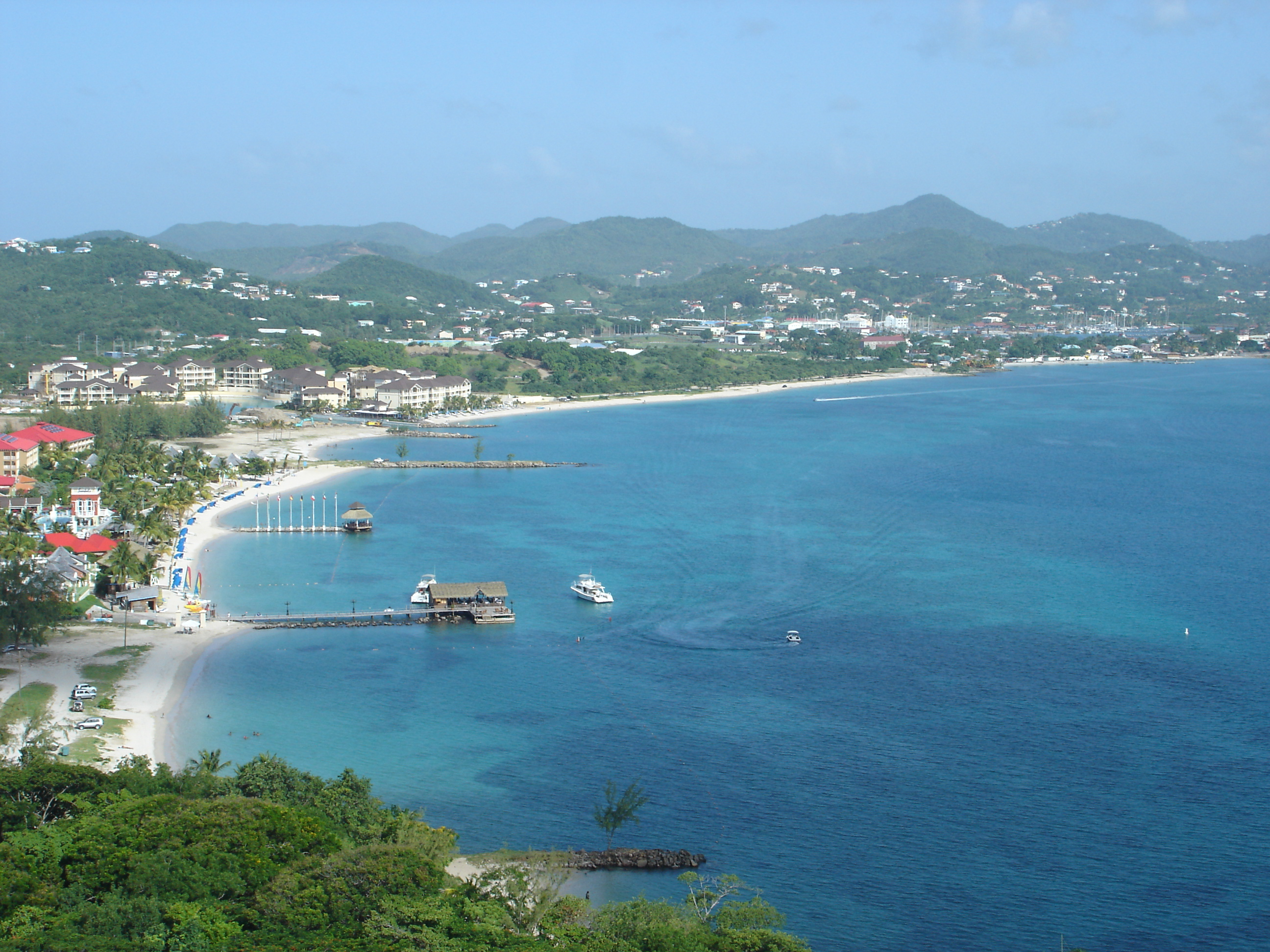
Gros Islet

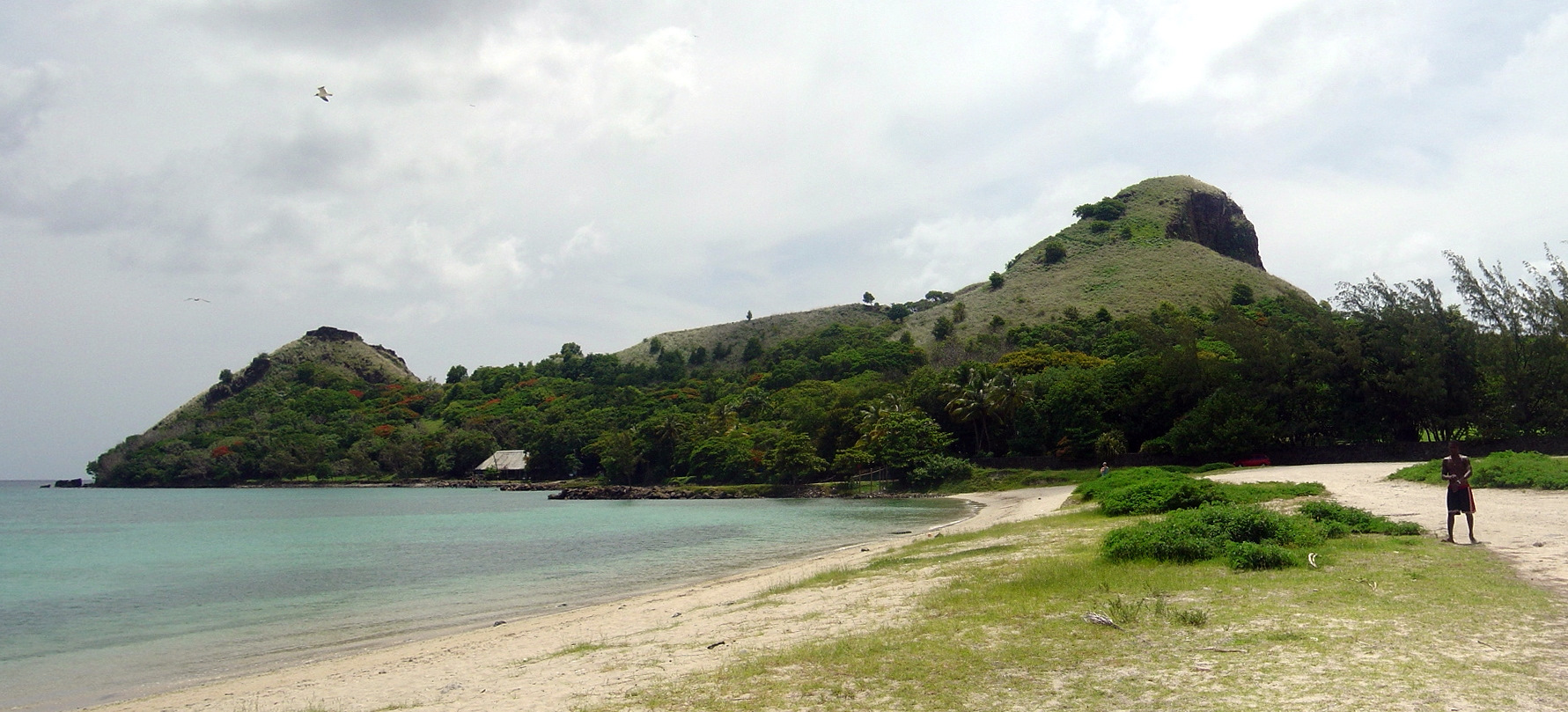
Pigeon Island

== See also ==
- Category: Tourist attractions in Saint Lucia
  - BodyHoliday Resort St. Lucia
  - Cap Maison
- Districts of Saint Lucia
- Economy of Saint Lucia
- List of airports in Saint Lucia
- List of rivers of Saint Lucia
- List of cities in Saint Lucia
- Saint Lucian cuisine
- Visa policy of Saint Lucia
