= List of beaches in Saint Lucia =

Beaches in Saint Lucia

Saint Lucia is known for beaches some of which are covered in black volcanic sand. The island's temperature averages 27 °C (80 °F) all year. The island offers many water adventures, everything from snorkelling to jet skiing to parasailing.

== Beaches ==
The following are some of the most popular and well known beaches in the island nation of Saint Lucia:

Beaches in Saint Lucia
Beach	Location	District	Coordinates	Refs
Anse Chastanet beach	Anse Chastanet Cove	Soufrière District	13°51′54″N 61°04′44″W	
Anse Cochon Beach	Cochon Bay	Canaries District	13°55′39″N 61°03′29″W	
Anse de Sables Beach (Sandy Beach)	Anse de Sables	Vieux Fort District	13°43′24″N 60°56′32″W	
Anse Louvet beach	Anse Louvet Bay	Dennery District	13°57′47″N 60°52′39″W	
Anse Mamin Beach	Anse Mamin	Soufrière District	13°52′14″N 61°04′46″W	
Choc Beach	Choc Bay	Castries District	14°01′58″N 60°58′33″W	
Grande Anse beach	Grande Anse	Gros Islet District	14°00′26″N 60°53′07″W	
Honeymoon Beach	L'Islet Point	Micoud District	13°46′27″N 60°54′08″W	
Kiwanies Beach	Choc Bay	Castries District	14°01′18″N 60°59′29″W	
Laborie Beach	Laborie Bay	Laborie District	13°44′56″N 61°00′05″W	
Malibar Beach	Choc Bay	Gros Islet District	14°01′33″N 60°59′00″W	
Marigot Bay	Marigot Point	Castries District	13°58′13″N 61°01′45″W	
Marisule Beach	Choc Bay	Gros Islet District	14°02′51″N 60°58′19″W	
Pigeon Island beach	Pigeon Island	Gros Islet District	14°05′30″N 60°57′34″W	
La Pointe Beach	La Pointe	Choiseul District	13°47′23″N 61°04′03″W	
Reduit Beach	Rodney Bay	Gros Islet District	14°04′31″N 60°57′19″W	
La Toc Beach	La Toc Bay	Castries District	14°00′41″N 61°00′34″W	
Vigie Beach	Choc Bay, near George F. L. Charles Airport	Castries District	14°01′29″N 60°59′05″W	
Yellow Sands Beach	La Toc Bay	Castries District	14°00′33″N 61°00′32″W	

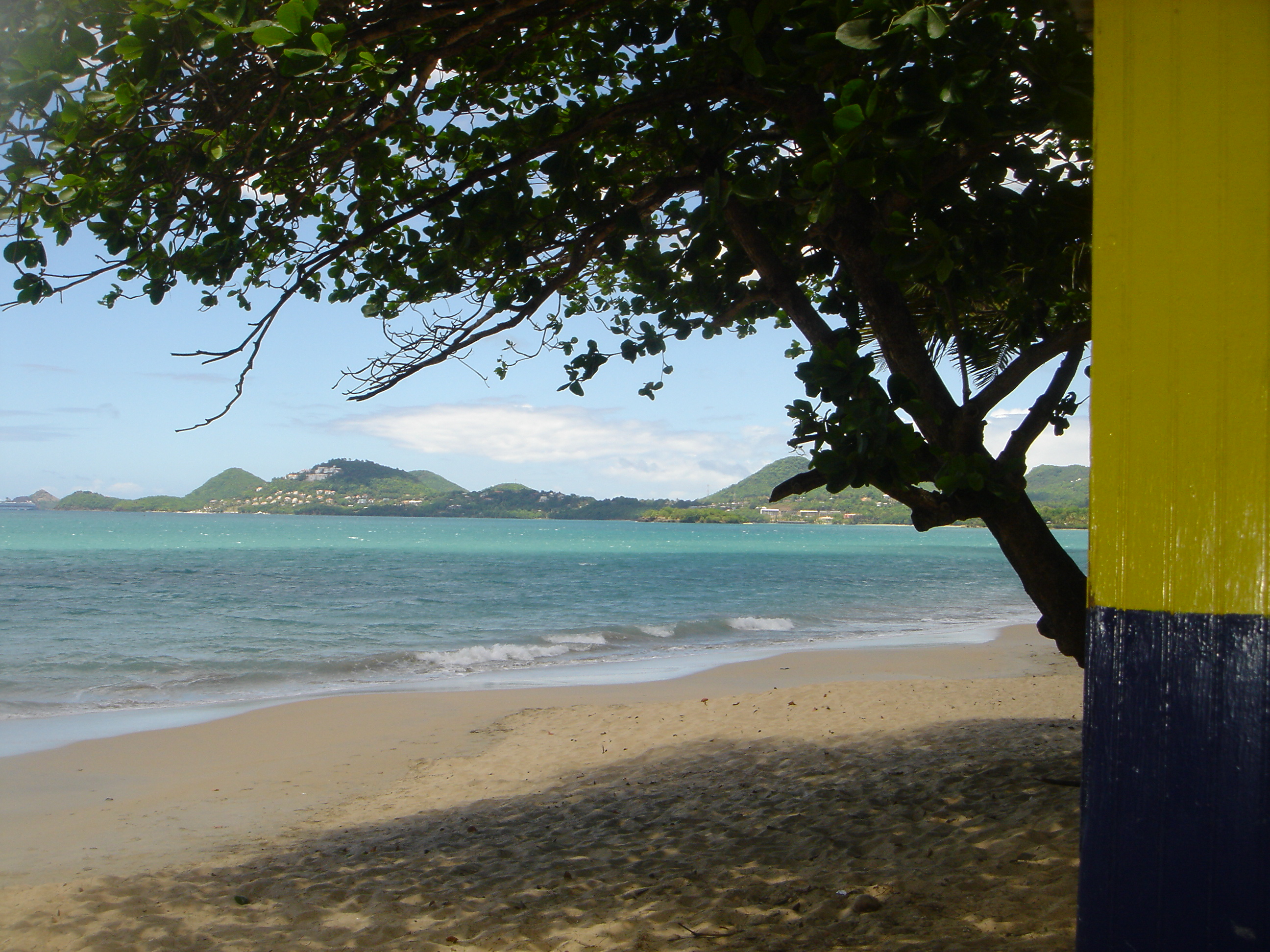
Vigie Beach

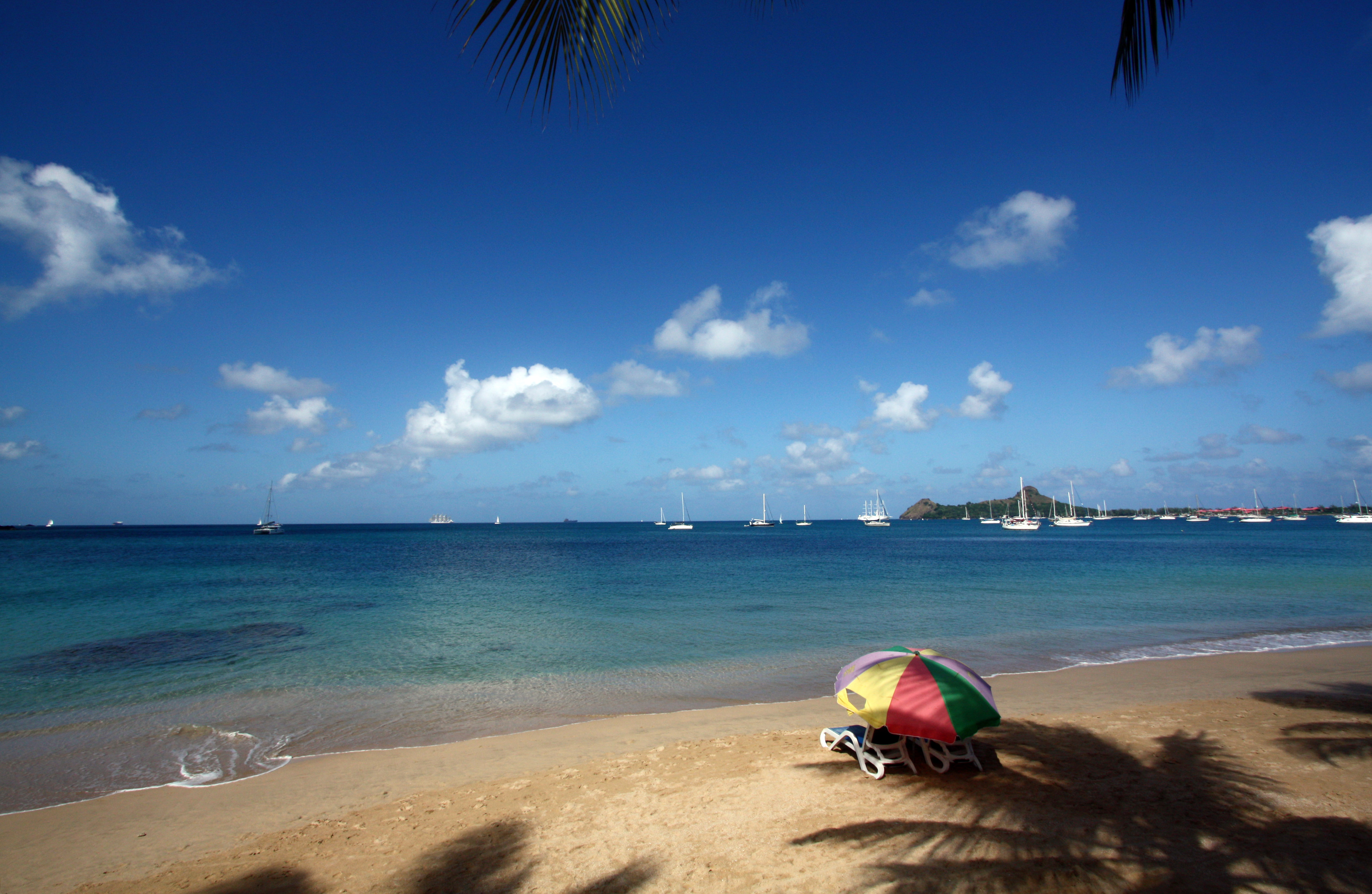
Reduit Beach

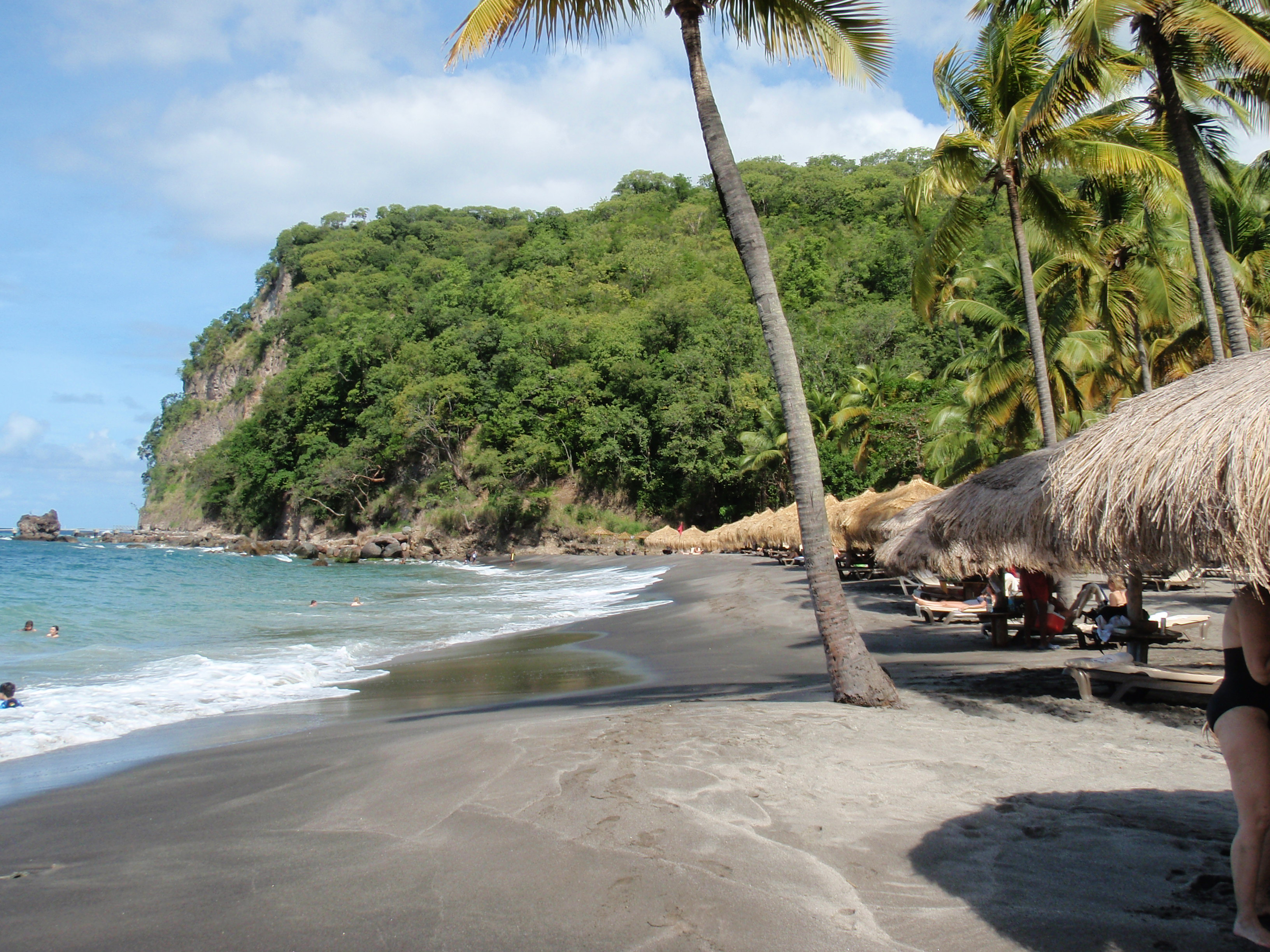
Anse Chastanet Beach

== See also ==
- List of beaches
