= Thomas Goldstein =

Thomas Goldstein may refer to:

- Tom Goldstein (born 1970), American attorney and poker player
- Thomas Goldstein (historian) (1913–1997), German-born United States historian
