= François Le Clerc =

Privateer

- Born: Réville, Kingdom of France
- Piratical career
- Nickname: Jambe de Bois; Pie de Palo
- Type: Privateer
- Allegiance: France
- Base of operations: Atlantic; Caribbean

François Le Clerc was a French privateer who attacked Spanish and Portuguese shipping and settlements in the Caribbean and North Atlantic. Multiple settlements, such as Santa Cruz de La Palma and Santiago de Cuba, were attacked during his career.

== Early life ==
François Le Clerc was born in Réville, France, around 1530. He married Marie Rouxel, with whom he had one child. He had a career in France despite being a member of the Huguenots.

== Career ==
In the French Navy Le Clerc was a captain. Le Clerc participated in the French attack on Guernsey in 1549, and lost his left leg. Le Clerc was given the nickname Jambe de Bois in France and Pie de Palo in Spain due to his peg leg. Saint Lucia was used by Le Clerc in the 1550s.

Le Clerc was ennobled in 1551 by King Henry II of France due to his maritime work. Henry granted the first French letter of marque for the Caribbean to Le Clerc 1553. Between 1552 and 1554, Le Clerc raided the Canary Islands and Antilles.

Three royal ships were placed under the command of Le Clerc in 1553 so that he could raid the Caribbean. This fleet attacked coastal towns across Puerto Rico and Hispaniola and seized six Spanish treasure ships. The Portuguese were also attacked by Le Clerc.

Santa Cruz de La Palma was attacked by Le Clerc on 21 July 1553, and he destroyed the town hall during the ten day sacking of the settlement. Santiago de Cuba was sacked and almost entirely destroyed by Le Clerc and his subordinate Jacques de Sores in 1554. In 1555, Le Clerc returned to the Caribbean with a larger fleet and continued his raids. Sores took a portion of the fleet and occupied Havana for twenty days in July.

Returning to France in 1559, Le Clerc was placed in charge of another expedition. Le Clerc's raids took him as far as Panama in 1560.

== Legacy ==
Forbes estimated in 2008 that he was the 13th-highest earning pirate with around $7.5 million.

== Works cited ==
=== Books ===
- Mémoires de la Société nationale académique de Cherbourg. Vol. 23. Société nationale académique de Cherbourg. 1942.
- Fuente, Alejandro (2011). Havana and the Atlantic in the Sixteenth Century. University of North Carolina Press. ISBN 9781469603544.
- Jennings, Matthew (2011). New Worlds of Violence: Cultures and Conquests in the Early American Southeast. University of Tennessee Press. ISBN 9781572337992.
- Verne, Jules; Evans, Arthur (2013). Travel Scholarships. Wesleyan University Press. ISBN 9780819573629.
- Vila-Santa, Nuno (2024). Knowledge Exchanges Between Portugal and Europe: Maritime Diplomacy, Espionage, and Nautical Science in the Early Modern World (15th-17th Centuries). Amsterdam University Press. ISBN 9789048560479.

=== Journals ===
- Baumgartner, Frederic (1987). "Adam's Will: Act II Henry II and French Overseas Expeditions". Proceedings of the Meeting of the French Colonial Historical Society. 11. Michigan State University Press: 137–147. doi:10.2307/45137398. JSTOR 45137398.
- Vila-Santa, Nuno (2023). "The Untold Story of Oceanic Pilot Bartolomeu Borges who Guided Jean Ribault to Florida in 1562: Document Transcription and Translation, Accompanied by an Historical Introduction". Terrae Incognitae. 55 (1). Society for the History of Discoveries: 82–102.

=== News ===
- "Top-Earning Pirates". Forbes. 19 September 2008. Archived from the original on 13 May 2026.

=== Web ===
- "Historia de San Miguel de La Palma". Palmeros en el Mundo. Archived from the original on 6 August 2018.
