= Pigeon Island (Saint Lucia) =

Islet in Saint Lucia; home to the 18th century fortification Fort Rodney

Coordinates: 14°05′N 60°58′W

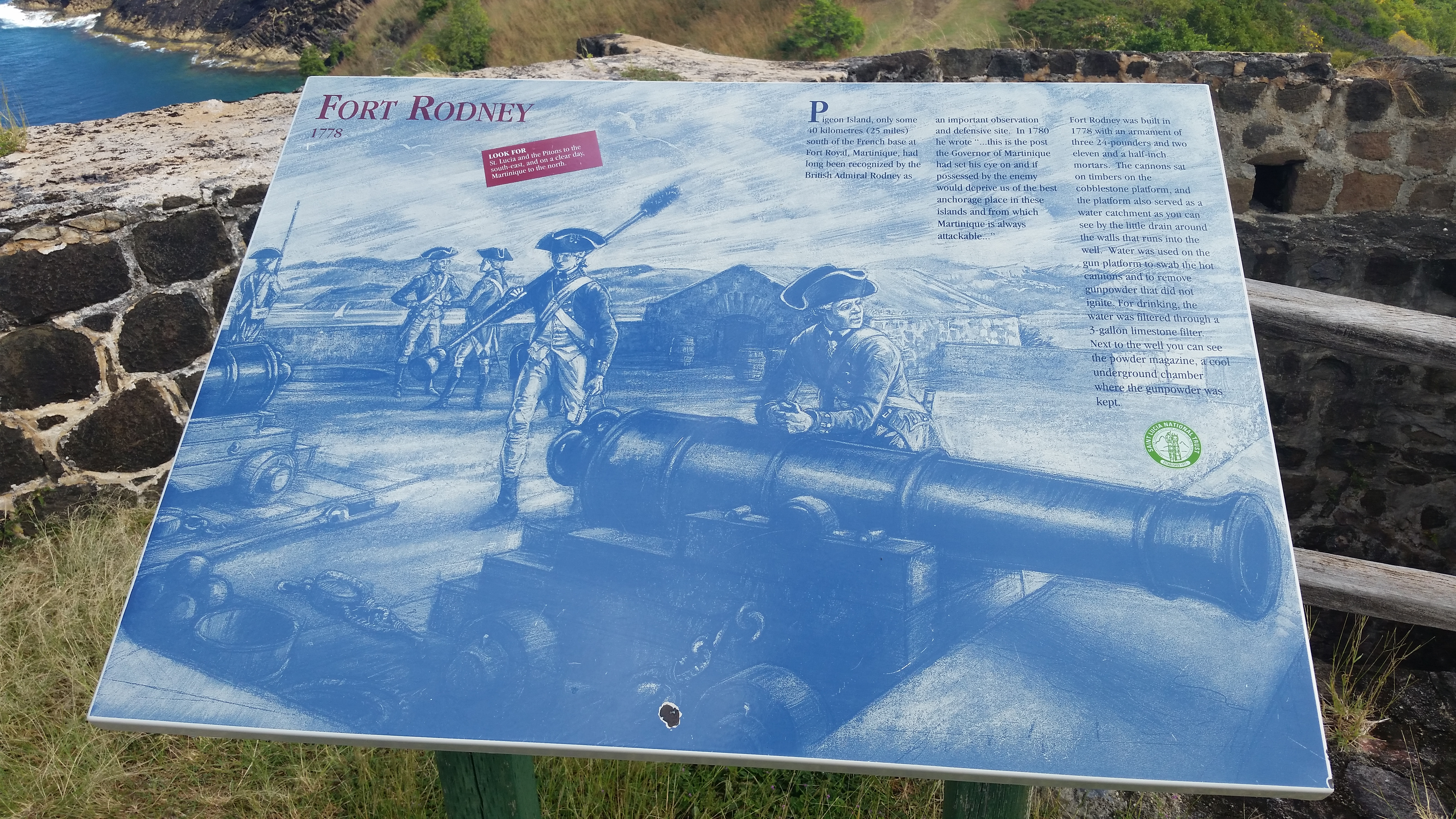
Pigeon Island historical marker for Fort Rodney

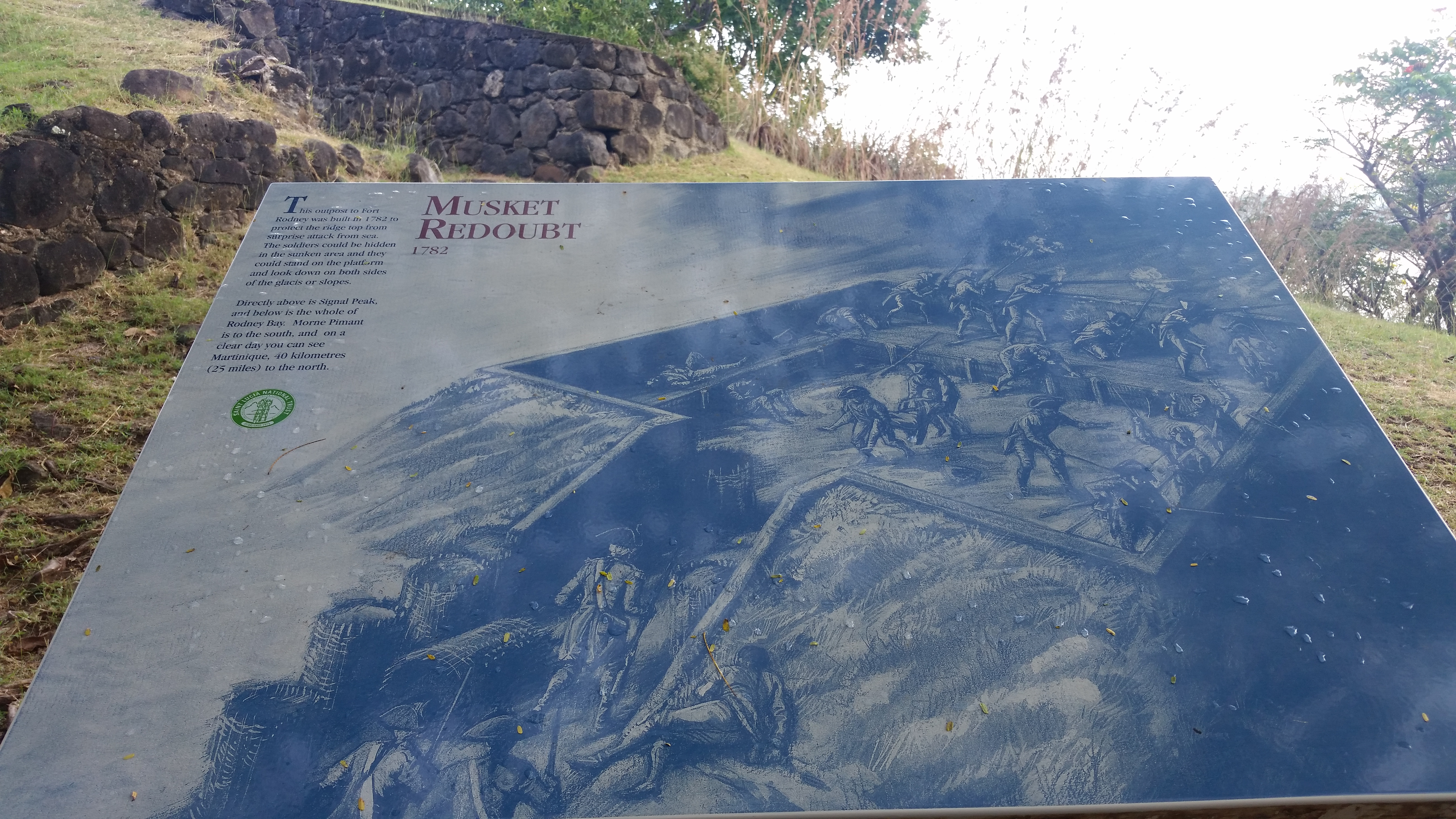
Pigeon Island historical marker for Fort Rodney's redoubt

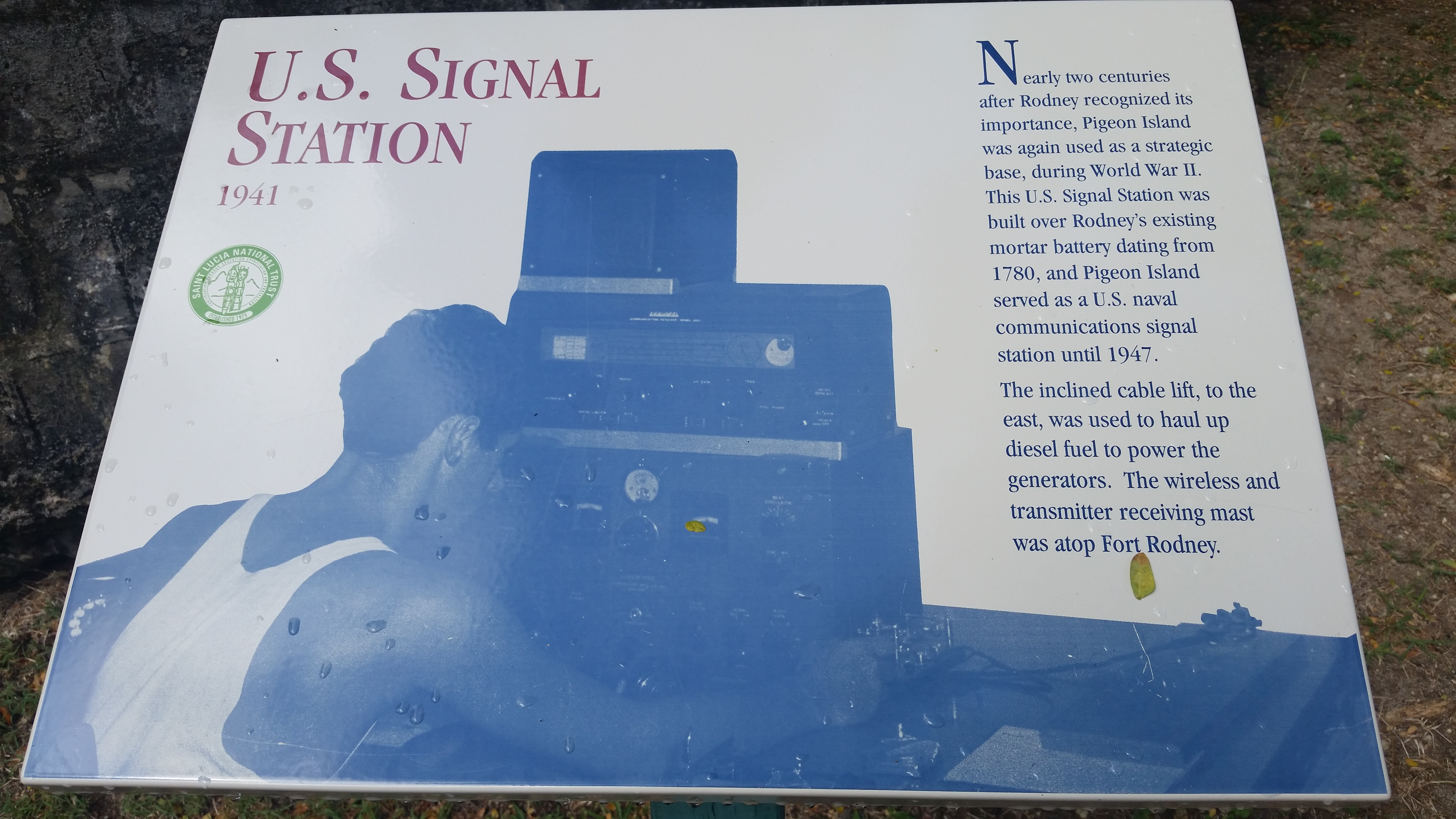
Pigeon Island historical marker for WW II

Pigeon Island is a 44-acre (180,000 m^{2}) islet located in Gros Islet in the northern region of Saint Lucia. Once isolated from the country in the Caribbean Sea, the island was artificially joined to the western coast of mainland in 1972 by a man-made causeway built from dirt excavated to form the Rodney Bay Marina. Composed of two peaks the island is a historic site with numerous forts such as an 18th-century British fort and Fort Rodney both used by the British to spy on French Ships from neighbouring Martinique. In 1979 it was named a national park and again in 1992 it became a national landmark under the control of the Saint Lucia National Trust (SLNT). Today, Pigeon Island is the home and major venue of the Saint Lucia Jazz Festival.

== History ==
The Arawak and Carib artifacts date back to around 1000 AD. In the middle of the 16th century, a French pirate, François le Clerc, used Pigeon Island as his base. Nathaniel Uring landed here in 1722.

Between 1779 and 1782, Admiral George Rodney took over Pigeon island, and built Fort Rodney. To establish clear viewpoints, Rodney ordered all trees on Pigeon Island to be cut down. From the higher peak, Signal Hill, Rodney was able to observe the French naval base of Fort Royal on Martinique. In 1782, Admiral Rodney sailed from Pigeon Island to confront the French fleet, which he defeated in the Battle of Saints.

Two barracks, with kitchen, were built in 1808 and used until 1901. Additionally, quarters for the commanding officer, and an Officer's Mess were built in 1808.

Originally fortified with 4 24 pounders and 2 mortars, the cannons were sold off in 1861.

Rodney's 1780 lime kiln was modified to process whale oil in the 1920s, and did so until 1926.

Franklin Roosevelt visited the area aboard the USS Tuscaloosa on 8 Dec. 1940. The US Navy built a naval air station at Reduit in 1941 under the Destroyers for Bases Agreement for the Battle of the Caribbean, and used the island as a communication station. A squadron of 18 PBY-5 Catalinas patrolled for German submarines. The station was deactivated on 1 June 1947.

The island was connected to the mainland via a causeway in 1971.

== See also ==
- Saint Lucia
- Saint Lucia Jazz Festival
- Rodney Bay
- Gros-Islet

== Gallery ==
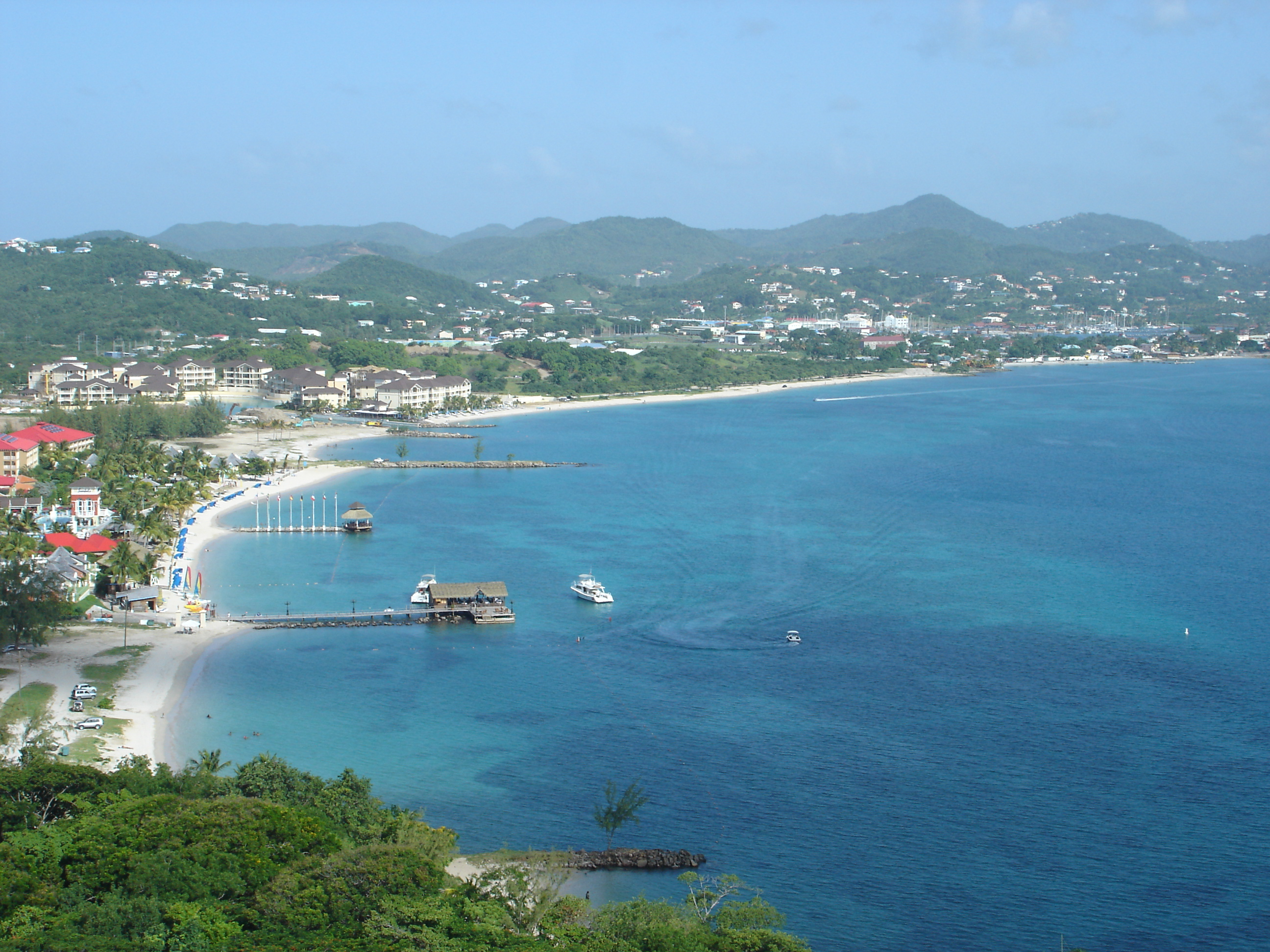
At the top of Pigeon Island, looking east towards Reduit Beach. To the left is the Landings Sandals Grande.

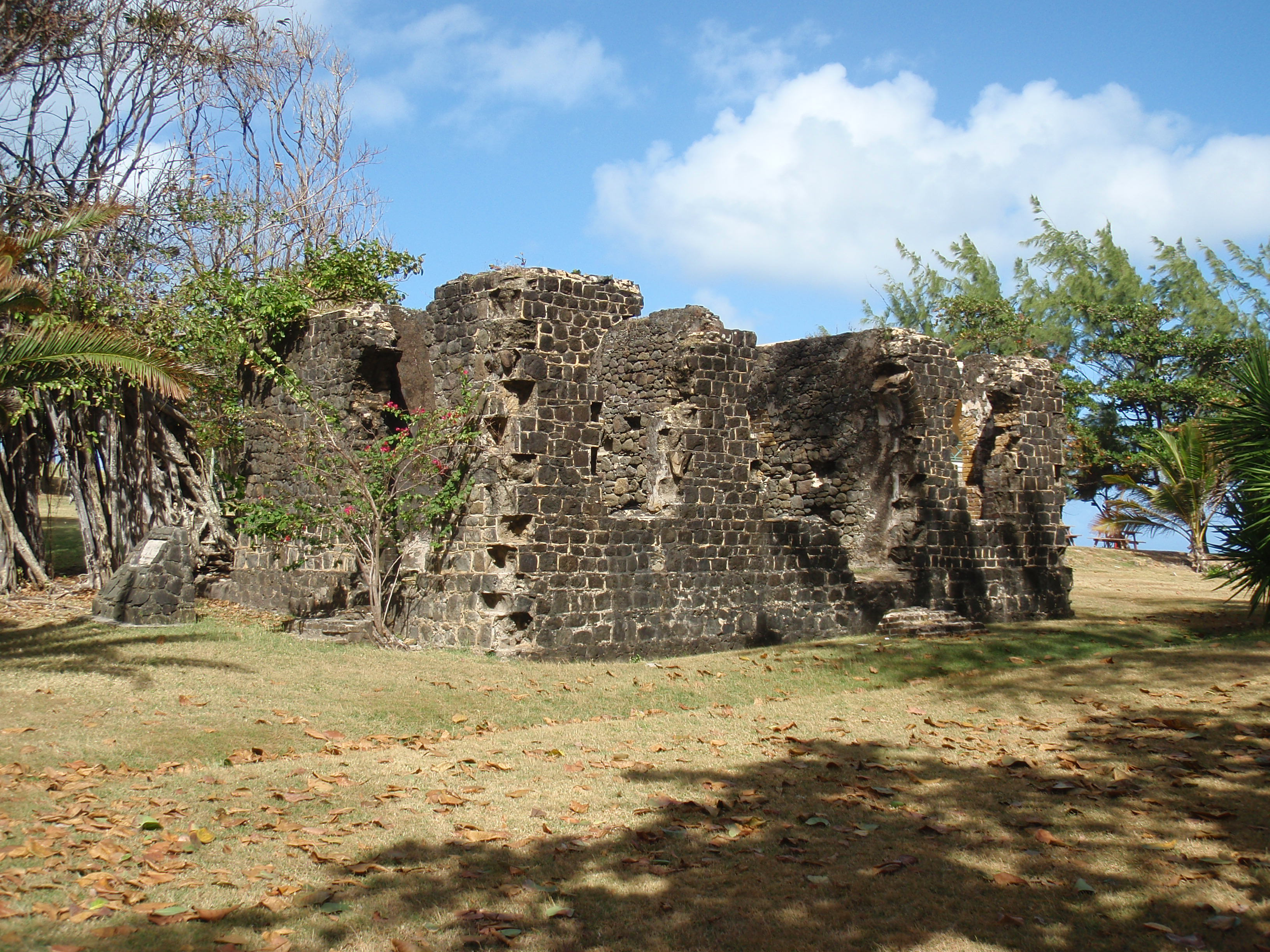
Officer's Kitchen

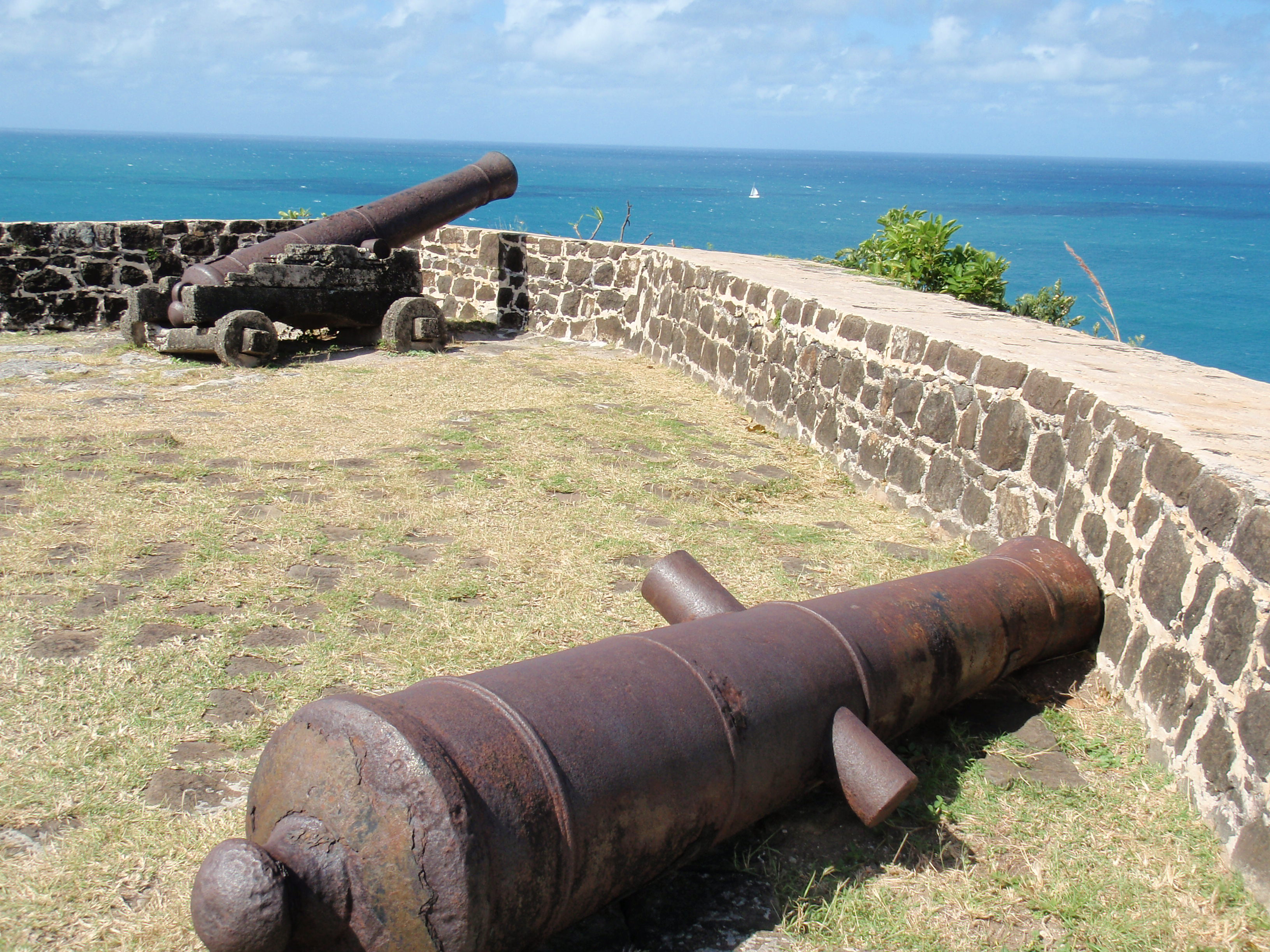
Fort Rodney

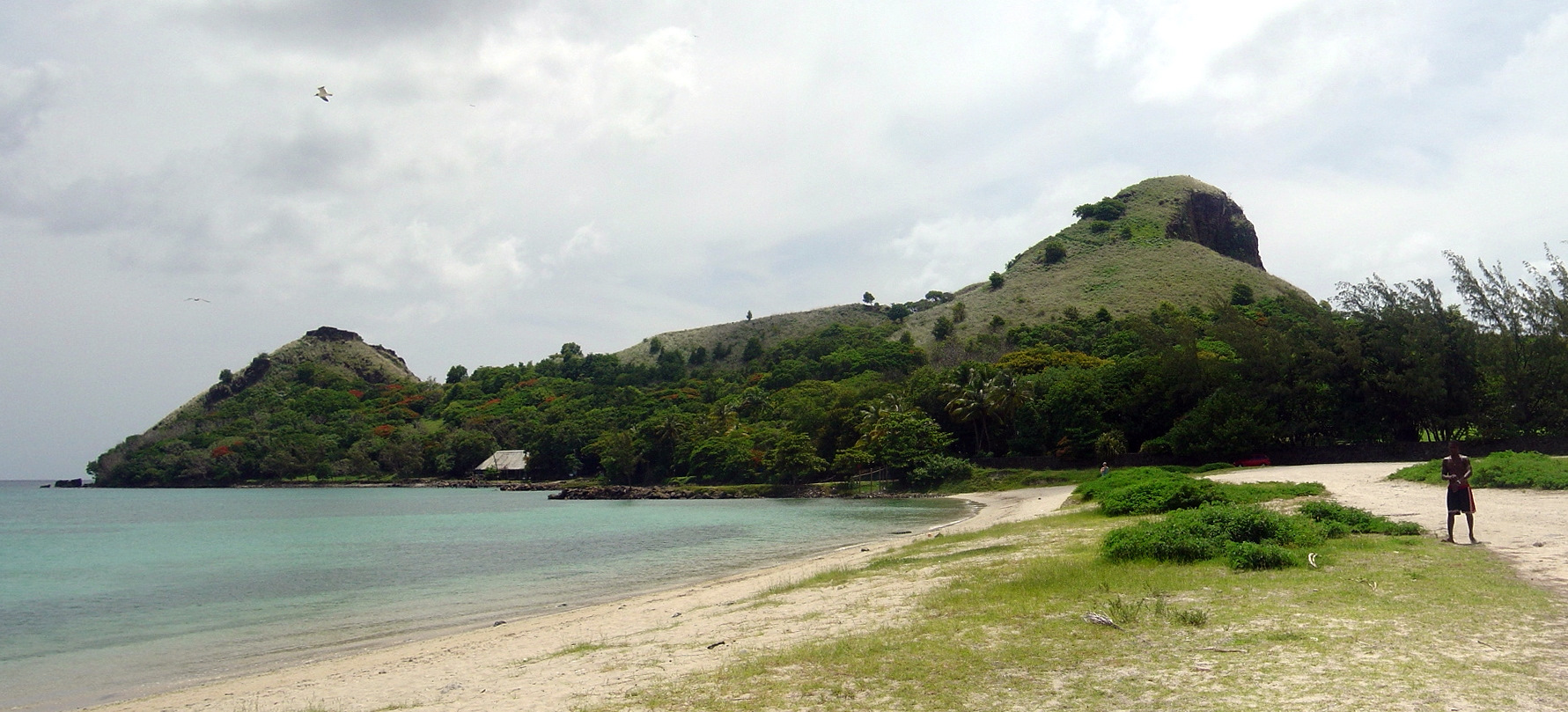
Pigeon Island as seen from the causeway
