= Sikes Act =

The Sikes Act (16 USC 670a-670o, 74 Stat. 1052) was enacted into United States law on September 15, 1960. It provides for cooperation by the Department of the Interior and Department of Defense with state agencies in planning, development and maintenance of fish and wildlife resources on military reservations throughout the United States.

The Sikes Act is "an act To promote effectual planning, development, maintenance, and coordination of wildlife, fish, and game conservation and rehabilitation in military reservations". In other words, it attempts to ensure that fish, wildlife and other natural resources that exist on and are associated with military lands in the United States are protected and enhanced. The Sikes Act is written such that conservation activities are promoted while allowing military lands to continue to meet the needs of military operations.

The Sikes Act requires that conservation goals are cooperatively developed and recorded in a planning document called an Integrated Natural Resource Management Plan, or INRMP. Installation commanders are responsible for ensuring that INRMPs are completed for their installation and in cooperation with state and federal fish and wildlife agencies. An INRMP is only valid for a period of five years. Before the five-year period ends it must be reviewed by the U.S. Fish and Wildlife Service, relevant state agencies and the military installation. If necessary, the INRMP is updated by the installation in cooperation with the U.S. Fish and Wildlife Service and state agencies.

Cooperative conservation is an important provision of the Sikes Act, as currently amended. It provides military service programs and installations the ability to enter into partnerships with state and Department of Interior agencies (particularly the U.S. Fish and Wildlife Service) that advance natural resource conservation on military lands.
