= Anse Mamin =

Bay in Saint Lucia

Anse Mamin (Saint Lucia)

Anse Mamin (Mamin Bay) is a bay on the coast with a small black sand beach in Soufrière District, Saint Lucia.

It is located near Anse Chastanet and the two beaches are linked by a rocky path below the cliffs.

Anse Mamin offers 12 kilometres (7.5 mi) of wooded trails.

== History ==
Anse Mamin is beautiful today, but has a tragic past. It was a sugar cane plantation in the 18th century, which was decimated by a flood in 1845, abandoned, and only ruins remained at the turn of the millennium.

When Saint Lucia was a British colony, the authorities built local roads, called byeways, in the early 20th century, to connect Anse Mamin to Soufriere Highway. At the time, Anse Mamin was "the first maroon village" in the colony.

In 1991, Anse Manin was included in Saint Lucia's environmental profile, for its coral reef, and risks from both fishing and recreational over-use.

== Nearby locations ==
Other nearby sites include:

- Anse Mamin Bay, 13°52′14″N 61°04′46″W
- Anse Mamin River, 13°52′15″N 61°04′43″W
- The village of Mamin, 13°51′51″N 61°04′10″W
- Anse Mamin Estate, 13°52′02″N 61°04′13″W

== See also ==
- 1991 in the environment
- List of beaches in Saint Lucia
- Tourism in Saint Lucia.
- Vigie Beach
