= Saint Lucia Jazz and Arts Festival =

Annual event in Saint Lucia

- Genre: Jazz, R&B, Calypso
- Location: Saint Lucia
- Coordinates: 13°53′N 60°58′W
- Years active: 1992–present
- Website: stlucia.org

The Saint Lucia Jazz and Arts Festival is an annual event on the Caribbean island of Saint Lucia that brings together local and international musicians and other performing artists, as well as artisans. The festival presents jazz, R&B, and Calypso music, dance, theatre, and international couture.

== History ==
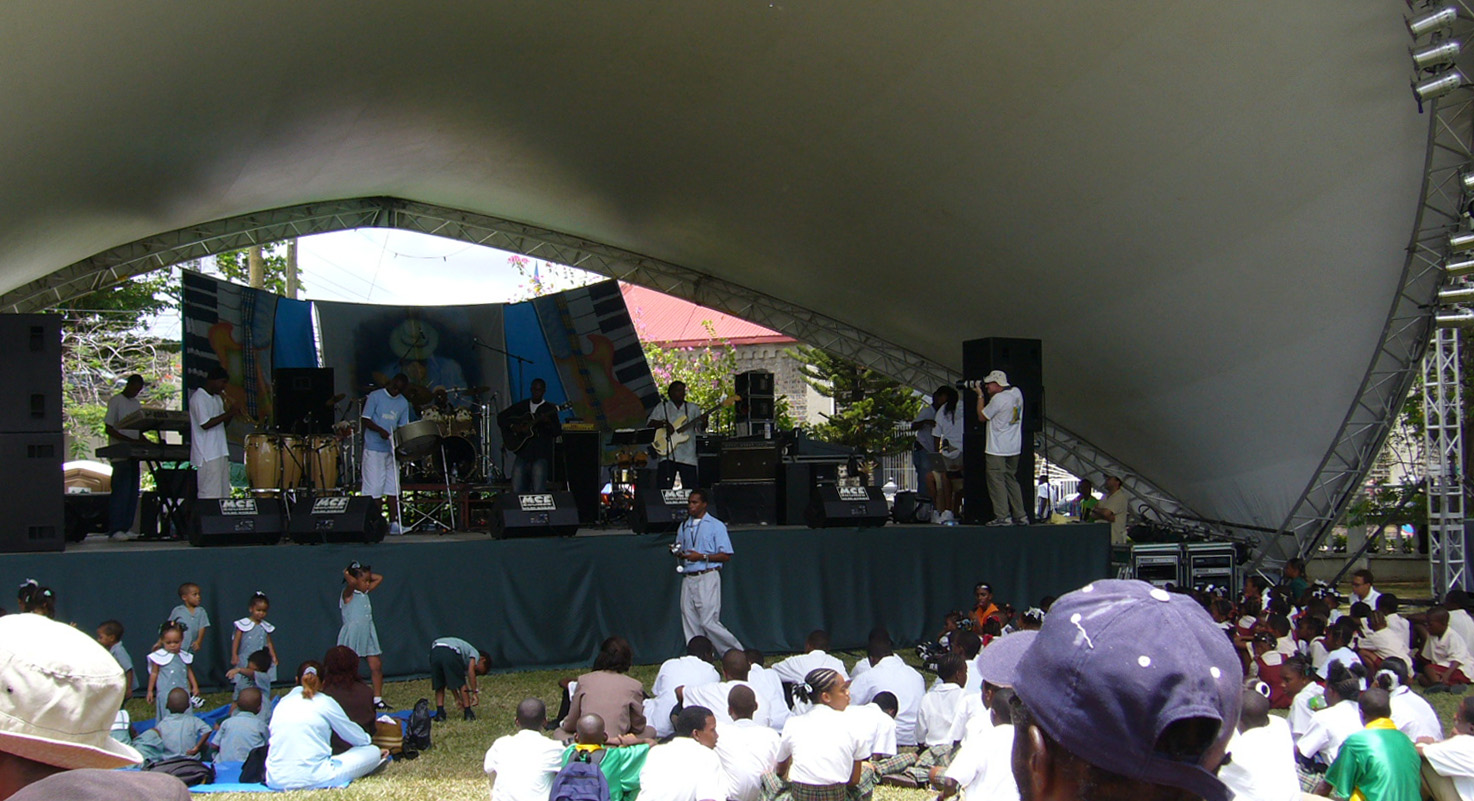
Jazz at the Square, Castries

The first Saint Lucia Jazz Festival was held in 1992 as an initiative to extend the tourist season and increase foreign exchange in Saint Lucia into May which had previously been a relatively quiet period. It was inspired by the launching of the October Jazz Festival in 1991 spearheaded by Luther Francois as Musical Director. Originally, four locations were used; however, today the festival has expanded and several locations around the island are used to host performances (see list below). At first, the festival attendances were small. But as the years passed, word spread helped by coverage on the BET J television network, and it is now a well-established fixture on the Jazz festival calendar.

In 2011 the Saint Lucia Jazz Festival celebrated its 20th anniversary, a rare achievement, as several other Jazz festivals established in the Caribbean region had failed. In 2013 the festival was rebranded as the Saint Lucia Jazz and Arts Festival. The rebranding included a fashion show branded as Saint Lucia HOT Couture, the Cultural Explosion, Saint Lucia Sound Stage, and Blu Session - Word in an Altered Scale. Dance, art, theatre and culinary arts formed part of the new rebranding experience.

Performers have included George Benson, Mary J. Blige, Boyz II Men, Ciara, En Vogue, Herbie Hancock, Lauryn Hill, India.Arie, The Isley Brothers, Elton John, R. Kelly, Ladysmith Black Mambazo, John Legend, Mario, Branford Marsalis, Ne-Yo, Ocacia, Courtney Pine, Rihanna, Smokey Robinson, Santana, Trey Songz, Angie Stone, UB40, Luther Vandross, Amy Winehouse, American Idol winner Fantasia Barrino, and Malcolm-Jamal Warner. The event is ranked second in the Caribbean after the Trinidad Carnival.

== Locations ==
Venues used to host performances include Pigeon Point National Park ("Main Stage" & "Side Lawn"), Derek Walcott Square in central Castries ("Jazz on the Square"), The Great House, Fond D'or Heritage Park, Rudy John Beach Park, Vieux Fort Square, Balenbouche Estate, (the previous three events making up "Jazz in the South"), Soufrière Waterfront, La Place Carenage ("Teatime Jazz"), Duty Free Pointe Seraphine ("Jazz on the Pier"), Rodney Bay Beachfront ("Jazz on the Beach"), Mindoo Phillip Park, Royal Saint Lucian Hotel, Fire Grill (Jazz on the Grill), Rodney Bay Marina and Gaiety on Rodney Bay.

== Past performers ==
- Acoustic Alchemy
- Yolanda Adams
- Gerald Albright
- Ashanti
- Babyface
- Harry Belafonte
- Terence Blanchard
- Mary J. Blige
- Boyz II Men
- Norman Brown
- James Carter
- Ciara
- Stanley Clarke
- Natalie Cole
- Nicole David
- En Vogue
- Rachelle Ferrell
- Bunji Garlin
- Al Green
- Johnny Griffin
- Beres Hammond
- Herbie Hancock
- Morgan Heritage
- Ronald "Boo" Hinkson
- Los Hombres Calientes
- Shirley Horn
- Isley Brothers
- Freddie Jackson
- The Jacksons
- Joe
- Montell Jordan
- Kassav
- Chaka Khan
- Gladys Knight
- Kool & The Gang
- John Legend
- Gerald Levert
- Damian Jr. Gong Marley
- Brian McKnight
- Machel Montano
- New Edition
- Jeffrey Osborne
- Paul Peress
- Rihanna
- Smokey Robinson
- Diana Ross
- Rupee
- Seal
- Square One
- Angie Stone
- T.O.K.
- Third World
- UB40
- Luther Vandross
- Amy Winehouse
- Tito Puente
- Earl Klugh
