= Bobo Bergström =

Swedish chef

Bobo Bergström (born September 19, 1964) is a chef and restaurateur based in Rodney Bay, St Lucia.

== Biography ==
Bergström received his education in Sweden, did Military service and was Sub-Lieutenant for the Swedish Armed Forces. One year management training with the Scandic/Hilton Hotels, and the management training program, ÏTrain the Trainer for the Hilton Group.

Bergström worked in the Swedish Navy in the military officers restaurants, Royal Viking Hotel in Stockholm, North Norway Hotels as well as mid parts, and has worked both in Europe and the Caribbean. He gained recognition in various food competitions and earned several diplomas in cooking. He has worked for the Chef of the Swedish Royal Family as Chef de Cuisine at Michelin Star awarded restaurant Operakallaren in Stockholm.

In November 2005, Bergström opened The Edge Restaurant Bar and Sushi restaurant on St Lucia, serving European fusion cuisine and the island's first and only Sushi Bar.

== Restaurants ==
- The Edge, Rodney Bay
- Fire Grill, Rodney Bay
- Starfish, Rodney Bay

== Recognition and awards ==
- Nominated to compete for Sweden at Bocuse D’Or (World Championship for Chefs)
- Semi-finalist in the Swedish Chef of the Year Championships
- Gold Medal in the Salon Culinaire, Stockholm
- 3 Gold Medals at the Cooking Competition ANUGA
- Several medals with Stockholm Culinary Team at IKA, International Culinary Olympics
- Gold medallist with St. Lucia Team at the Taste of the Caribbean in Jamaica 2003, where he also earned the Caribbean Chef of The Year title.
- Silver medalist as captain for the St. Lucia Culinary Team at The Taste of the Caribbean in Puerto Rico 2004
- As Team Manager he coached St Lucia Team to a Silver Medal in Taste of the Caribbean 2005 and to a Gold Medal in Miami, 2006.
