= Vigie Beach =

Beach in Saint Lucia

- Beach
- Interactive map of Vigie Beach
- Coordinates: 14.0247°N 60.9847°W
- Location: 2 km north of Castries District, Saint Lucia
- Geology: White sand
- Designation: Protected
- Nearby Locations: George F. L. Charles Airport, Vigie Lighthouse, Vigie Point, Vigie village

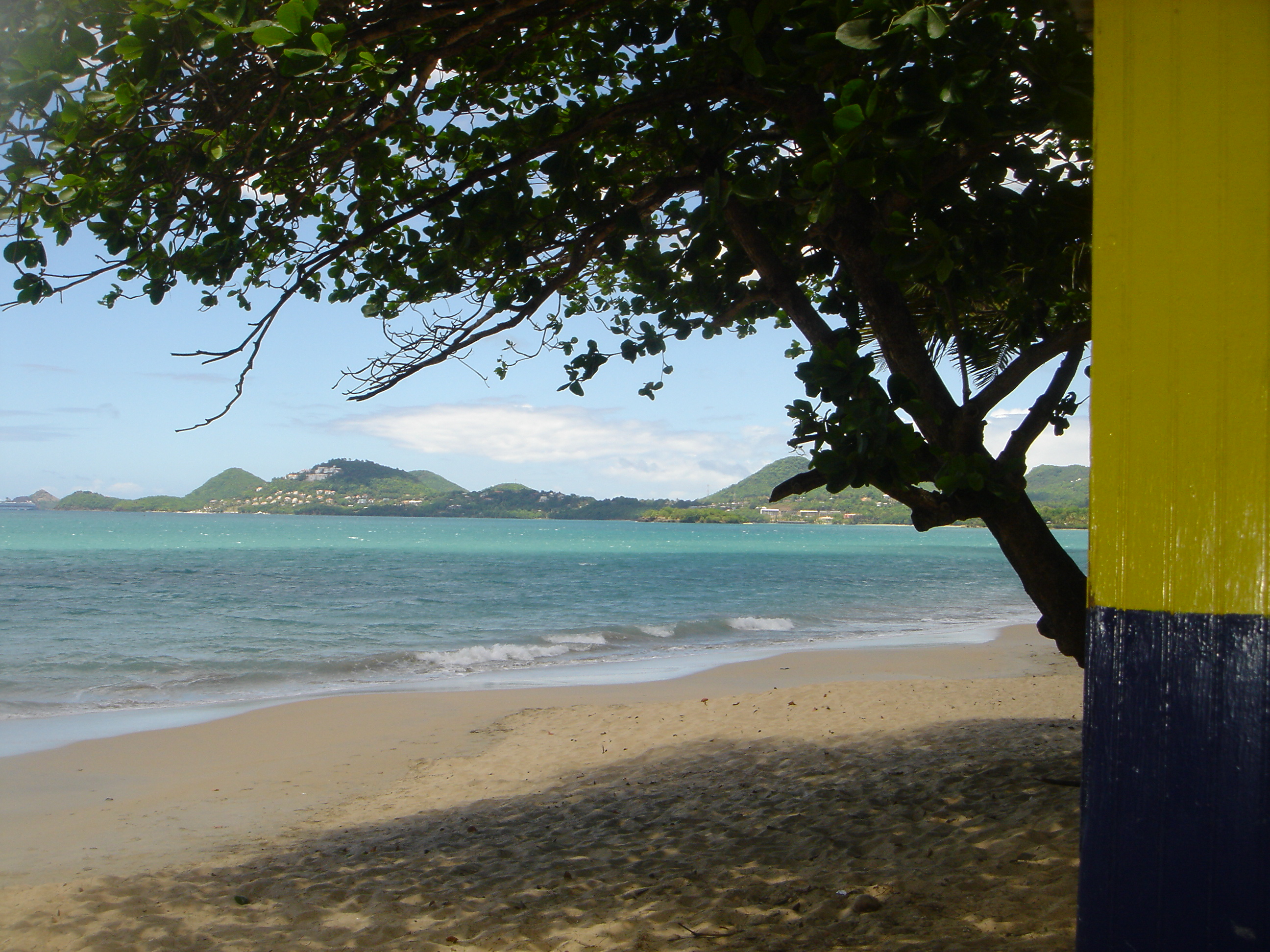
Vigie Beach, immediately opposite the Airport Check-in and Departure lounge area

Vigie Beach in Castries District, Saint Lucia

Vigie Beach is located 2 km north of Castries District, Saint Lucia, running parallel and immediately adjacent to the George F. L. Charles Airport.

It is a protected white sand beach. Immediately opposite the airport departure lounge are a few small food kiosks.

== History ==
Vigie Beach has been a historic "sea-bathing" destination for over 100 years; a 1927 British Colonial tour guide described it as "the famous Vigie Beach." In the century between the start of organized tourism in the mid-19th century and the commercial availability of air conditioning in the 1950s, sea bathing was one of the few ways to cool off in hot weather. In 1974, Fodor touted the Vigie Beach Hotel's air conditioning, along with the fishing, sand, and amenities.

Vigie Field, now George F. L. Charles Airport, opened in 1941 directly to the south of the beach and across a road.

From 1960 through 1970, the "chronic sand mining" of Vigie Beach, to construct concrete, worsened the effects of hurricanes and made "coastal resources management development" more difficult. Vigie Beach was so badly "effect[ed] by human interference" that "the bay was dredged in 1980 to rebuild the beach."

In 2004, it became the location of a cable landing for the Atlantic Crossing system.

== Nearby locations ==
The following locations are nearby:

- George F. L. Charles Airport, 14°01′13″N 60°59′35″W
- Vigie Lighthouse, 14°01′21″N 61°00′05″W
- Vigie Point, 14°01′26″N 61°00′17″W
- Vigie village, 14°01′07″N 60°59′43″W

== See also ==
- Anse Mamin
- List of beaches in Saint Lucia
- Tourism in Saint Lucia.
