= Society for the History of Discoveries =

The compass rose logo of the Society for the History of Discoveries

Society for the History of Discoveries (or SHD), founded in 1960, is an international, United States–based, organization formed to stimulate interest in teaching, research, and publishing the history of geographical exploration. Its members include those from several academic disciplines as well as archivists, non-affiliated scholars, and laypersons with an interest in history. SHD advances its goals by organizing annual meetings at which pertinent scholarly research papers are presented, by publishing a scholarly journal with articles on geographic exploration, and by annually offering an award to student research papers in the field. The Society is a US non-profit 501(c)(3) organization administered by a voluntary and unpaid team of council members and officers. Membership is open to all who have an interest in the history of geographical exploration. It publishes a semiannual journal, Terrae Incognitae.

== History ==
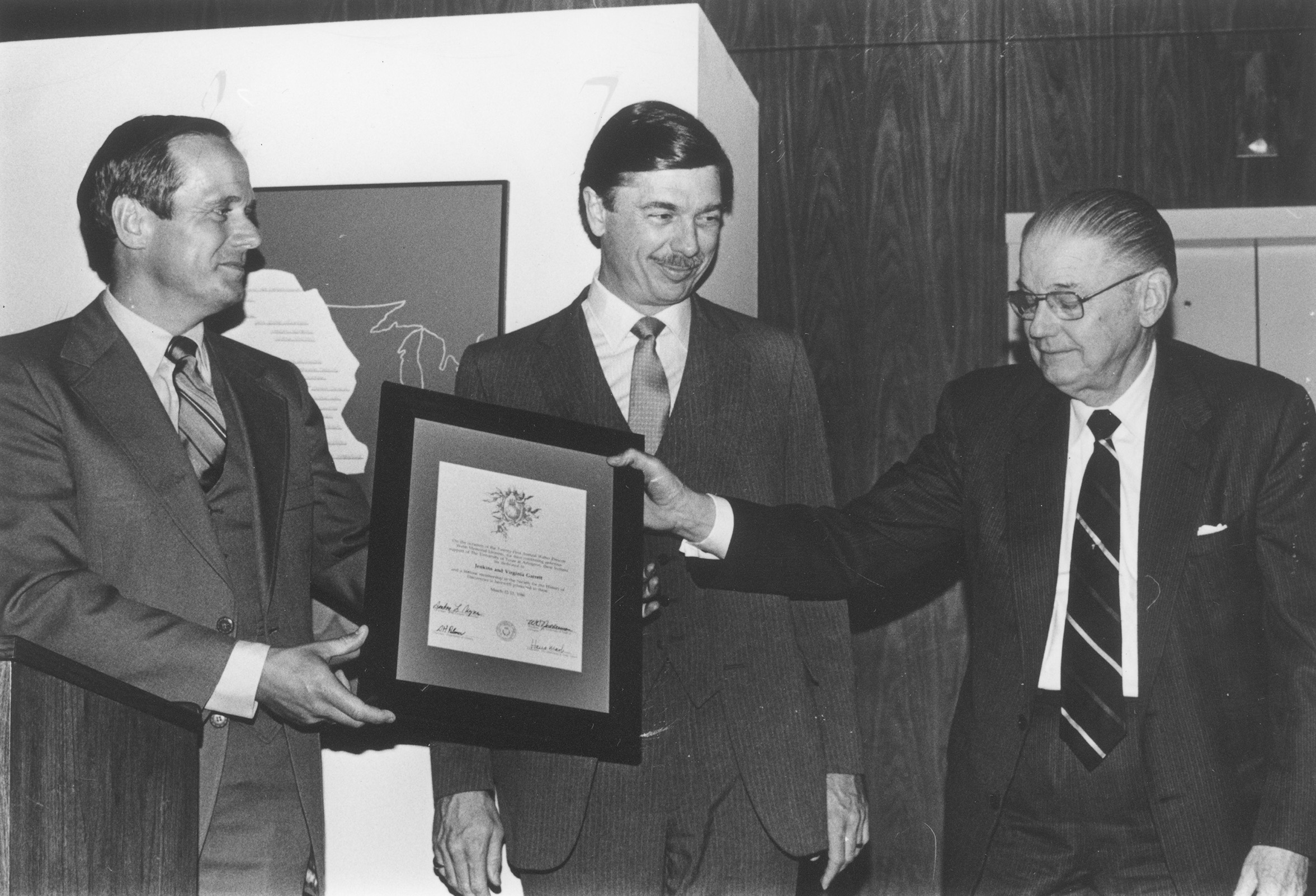
Dennis Reinhartz (professor of history), Charles Lowry (UTA Library Director), and Jenkins Garrett in 1986; lifetime membership in the Society for the History of Discoveries being granted to Garrett

The origin of the Society for the History of Discoveries (SHD) can be traced back to the summer of 1960 at an academic conference in Lisbon, Portugal, that commemorated the quincentenary of the death of Prince Henry the Navigator. American scholars John (Jack) Parker, Thomas (Thom) Goldstein, and Vsevolod (Steve) Slesarev, determined that there should be an organization in the United States that would encourage research into the history of exploration and discovery. Later, in December 1960, Goldstein posted a notice at the New York City meeting of the American Historical Association inviting interested parties to meet at a nearby restaurant. The people who attended that December 1960 luncheon constituted themselves as an executive board for a period of one year, and proceeded to organize SHD.

At the beginning of 1961, there were a total of twenty-one members in the Society. The appeal of this newly created learned Society was wide. Because there were no barriers to qualify for membership, within a short time historians, geographers, librarians, museum curators, archivists, philosophers, mathematicians, linguists, cartographers, navigators, medical doctors, editors, book sellers, book and map collectors, and independent scholars comprised the membership. Also, because there were no gender barriers, women scholars readily found a friendly intellectual home, and not only were they among the earliest members attracted to the new Society, they quickly assumed leadership positions. By 2010, the organization's membership counted over three hundred people, and numerous institutions subscribe to the Society's journal, Terrae Incognitae.

The founding members established the major goals to stimulate interest in teaching, research, and publishing the history of geographical exploration. Since its inception, the scope of the Society's activities encompasses the discovery, exploration, and mapping of the Earth's land and sea surface from earliest times to the present – the explorers and the explored. Fields of specialization thus include the history of European expansion, the history of cartography, navigation, colonial settlement, biography, and bibliography. To further its mission, the Society since 1969 has published annually a journal, Terrae Incognitae, and a newsletter, which since 2000 is titled Terra Cognita.

Records of the Society are archived in Special Collections at The University of Texas at Arlington Library.

== Organization ==
During most of its history, the Society was governed by three elected officers and six members of Council. The officers were President, Vice President, and Secretary-Treasurer. In 2006, the by-laws were changed to add another officer. Because the demands on the Secretary-Treasurer had grown, the office of Secretary-Treasurer was divided into two positions, Executive Secretary and Treasurer. Duties are found at the Society's Articles of Association, available via the Society website. Council meets formally at the annual meeting, and during the year via email and other technologies.

== Terrae Incognitae and other publications ==
The Society for the History of Discoveries determined at its 1966 annual meeting at West Point, New York, to publish an annual journal. It has become a major part of the Society's identity, and all agree that the unpaid editor performs the Society's most difficult and important task. Bruce Solnick was appointed Executive Editor, and first published by Nico Israel in Amsterdam, the first volume of Terrae Incognitae appeared in 1969. The peer-reviewed journal was published annually from 1969 through 2010. Beginning in 2011, the journal is published semiannually. Past and current editors are listed at the Society website. In addition to scholarly articles, each issue of Terrae Incognitae includes reviews of recent literature, and since 1979, an extensive bibliography of recent publications related to exploration and discovery. Beginning in 2008 the editorial board of Terrae Incognitae extended the number of book reviews to be published in each issue.

A paper by Commodore Pieter Verhoog was read by John Parker at the Columbus, Ohio, annual meeting in 1980 which interested those in attendance so much that a special session on the Columbus 1492 landfall was scheduled at the next annual meeting in Athens, Georgia. In addition to focusing on the Columbus landfall at the meeting, John Parker and Louis De Vorsey were charged with producing a special issue dedicated to the first landfall, and it was published in 1983 as Volume 15. It was re-published in 1985 by Wayne State University Press as a book titled In the Wake of Columbus: Islands and Controversy. One important and enduring result of the scholarship represented in Volume 15 was a highly received new translation of Columbus’ Diario by two Society members, Oliver Dunn and James Kelley, which was published to acclaim by the University of Oklahoma Press in 1991.

Beginning in 2010, Terrae Incognitae is published by Maney Publishing, an independent publisher operating internationally. Maney produces the journal, both printed hard copies and also, in the future, an online version. Maney will provide a full back issue archive online for institutional subscribers, and freely searchable electronic abstracts. When Maney began publication of the journal in 2010, it announced that it would scan and make available in electronic form the back issues to the membership.

=== Studies in the History of Discoveries ===
Published by the University of Chicago Press:

- Washburn, Wilcomb (1971). Proceedings of the Vinland Map Conference. Newberry Library. ISBN 0-226-87394-3.
- Medina, Pedro (1972). A Navigator's Universe: The Libro de Cosmographia of 1538 by Pedro Medina. ISBN 0-226-51715-2.
- Duncan, Thomas (1972). Atlantic Islands: Madeira, the Azores, and the Cape Verdes in Seventeenth-Century Commerce and Navigation. ISBN 0-226-17001-2.
- Cavendish, Thomas (1975). The Last Voyage of Thomas Cavendish, 1591-1592. ISBN 0-226-09819-2.
- Vigneras, Louis-André (1976). The Discovery of South America and the Andalusian Voyages. Newberry Library. ISBN 0-226-85609-7.

=== Terra Cognita ===
Along with Terrae Incognitae, the Society for the History of Discoveries also publishes an annual report each autumn, and 'Terra Cognita', a newsletter in the spring. These documents, prepared by the Executive Secretary, include Council and business meeting minutes, election results, membership (including a directory) information, reports from committees, abstracts of papers read at the annual meeting, information on upcoming meeting sites, obituaries, various announcements of interest to members, a financial report, and one of the most popular functions, news of members. Periodically, the Society's Articles of Association are reprinted.

== Annual meetings ==
The venues of annual meeting are contingent upon invitations from universities, libraries, maritime museums, map societies, and from organizations familiar with the purpose of the Society. Since 1960, annual meetings usually are held in the Fall, but the 1989 and 1997 meetings were held in the Summer. On several occasions, the Society met jointly with the Hakluyt Society, the North American Society for Oceanic History, and others.
