= Réville =

- Commune
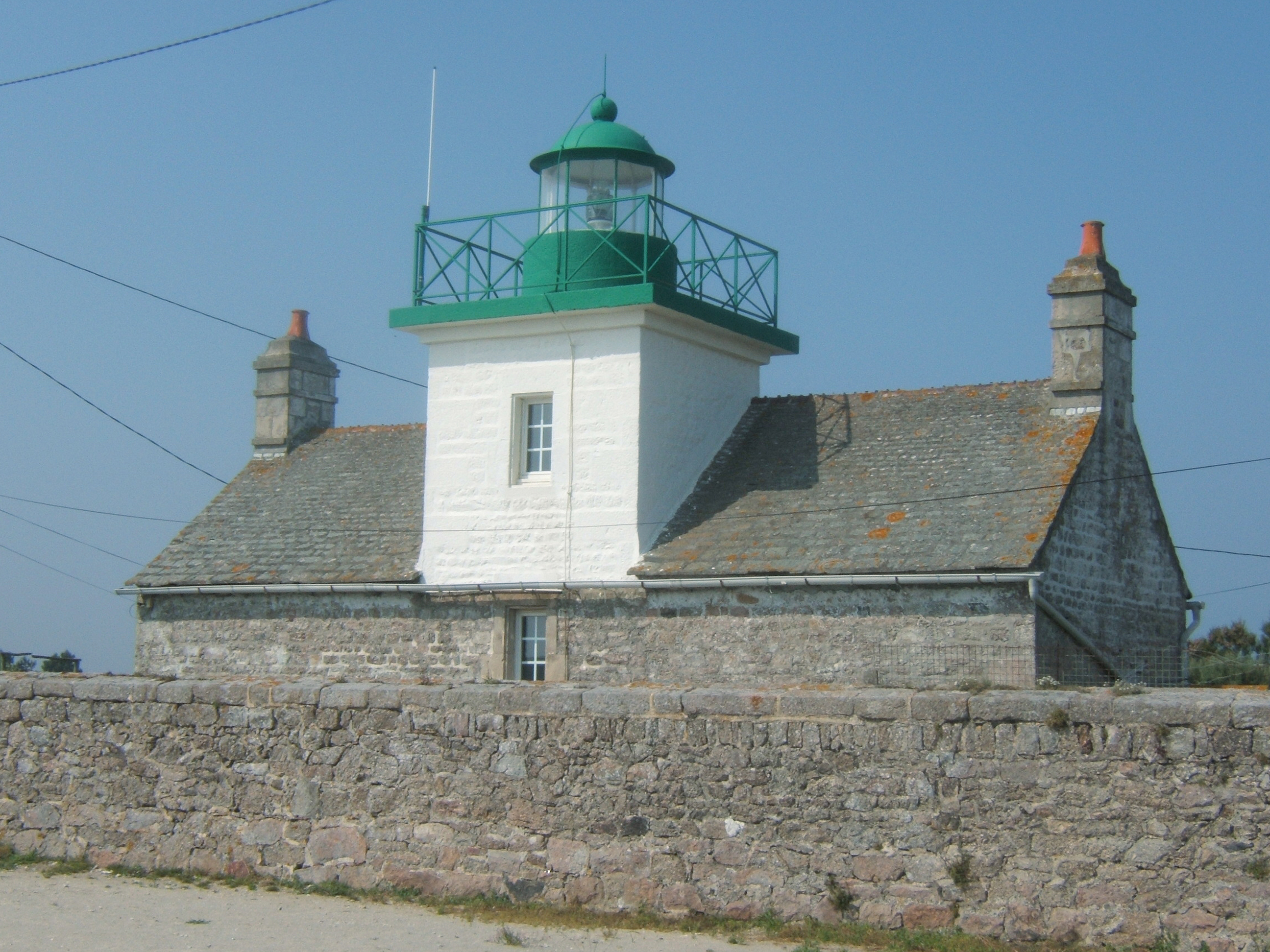
- Réville lighthouse
- Location of Réville
- Location within France Location within Normandy
- Coordinates: 49°37′11″N 1°15′24″W
- Country: France
- Region: Normandy
- Department: Manche
- Arrondissement: Cherbourg
- Canton: Val-de-Saire
- Intercommunality: CA Cotentin

Government
  - Mayor (2020–2026): Yves Asseline
- Area^{1}: 10.55 km^{2} (4.07 sq mi)
- Elevation: 15 m (49 ft)
- Highest elevation: 16 m (52 ft)
- Lowest elevation: 0 m (0 ft)
- Population (2023): 1,040
  - Density: 98.6/km^{2} (255/sq mi)
- Time zone: UTC+01:00 (CET)
  - Summer (DST): UTC+02:00 (CEST)
- INSEE/Postal code: 50433 /50760
- ^{1} French Land Register data, which excludes lakes, ponds, glaciers > 1 km^{2} (0.386 sq mi or 247 acres) and river estuaries.

Réville (French pronunciation: [ʁevil]) is a commune in the Manche department in Normandy in north-western France.

== See also ==
- Communes of the Manche department
