= Terrae Incognitae =

- Discipline: History, cartography
- Language: English
- Edited by: Richard Weiner

Publication details
- History: 1969-present
- Publisher: Society for the History of Discoveries (United States)
- Frequency: Triannual

Standard abbreviations
- ISO 4: Terrae Incogn.

Indexing
- ISSN: 0082-2884

Links
- Journal homepage

Terrae Incognitae is a triannual peer-reviewed academic journal covering the history of cartography, geography, and exploration. It is published by the Society for the History of Discoveries.
