= Thomas Goldstein (historian) =

American historian (1913–1997)

Thomas Eugen Goldstein (23 June 1913 – 19 November 1997) was a German-born American historian who wrote serial history books under the title of Dawn of Modern Science. He is also co-founder of the Society for the History of Discoveries. He left Berlin and moved to the United States during the Nazi regime in his early years.

== Biography ==
Thomas Goldstein (also Thomas E. and Thomas Eugen Goldstein) is the son of the writer Moritz Goldstein. In his study time, he was an assistant director of Erwin Piscator in a political theater group which belonged to a socialist-revolutionary student group. He became a research associate at the New York University in 1942 and also worked for the United States Office of War Information, for the Office of German Affairs in the US State Department and as a political commentator for the German Service of the Voice of America.

From 1955, Thomas Goldstein continued his scientific career. He became a lecturer of history at Brooklyn College, New York, and (until 1965) lecturer at the New School of Social Research. In 1959, he became a lecturer in the Department of History at the City College of New York, where he was subsequently appointed professor. He retired as a professor in 1978.

Thomas Goldstein's specialized in the common historical roots of the Renaissance and geographic thought and discovery in this period. He was a member of several scientific societies in the US.

== Selected publications ==
- Dawn of Modern Science (1984) ISBN 9780395321324
- Dawn of Modern Science: From the Ancient Greeks to the Renaissance (1988) ISBN 9780306806377
- Dawn of modern science : from the Arabs to Leonardo da Vinci (1980) ISBN 9780395321324 as reviewed in Quarterly Review of Biology.
- Geography in Fifteenth-Century Florence, in: John Parker (ed.): Merchants and Scholars, Minneapolis, 1965
- Conceptual Patterns Underlying the Vinlund Map, in: Renaissance News, Vol. 19, No. 4, 1966
- The Renaissance Concept of the Earth in its Influences Upon Copernicus, in: Terrae Incognitae, Vol. 4, 1972
- The Role of the Italian Merchgant Class in Renaissance and Discoveries, Terrae Incognitae, Vol. 8, 1976
- Impulses of Italian Renaissance Culture Behind the Age of Discoveries, in: Fredi Chiappelli (ed.), First Images of America, Berkeley, 1976
