= Rodney Bay =

Bay in Gros Islet Quarter, Saint Lucia

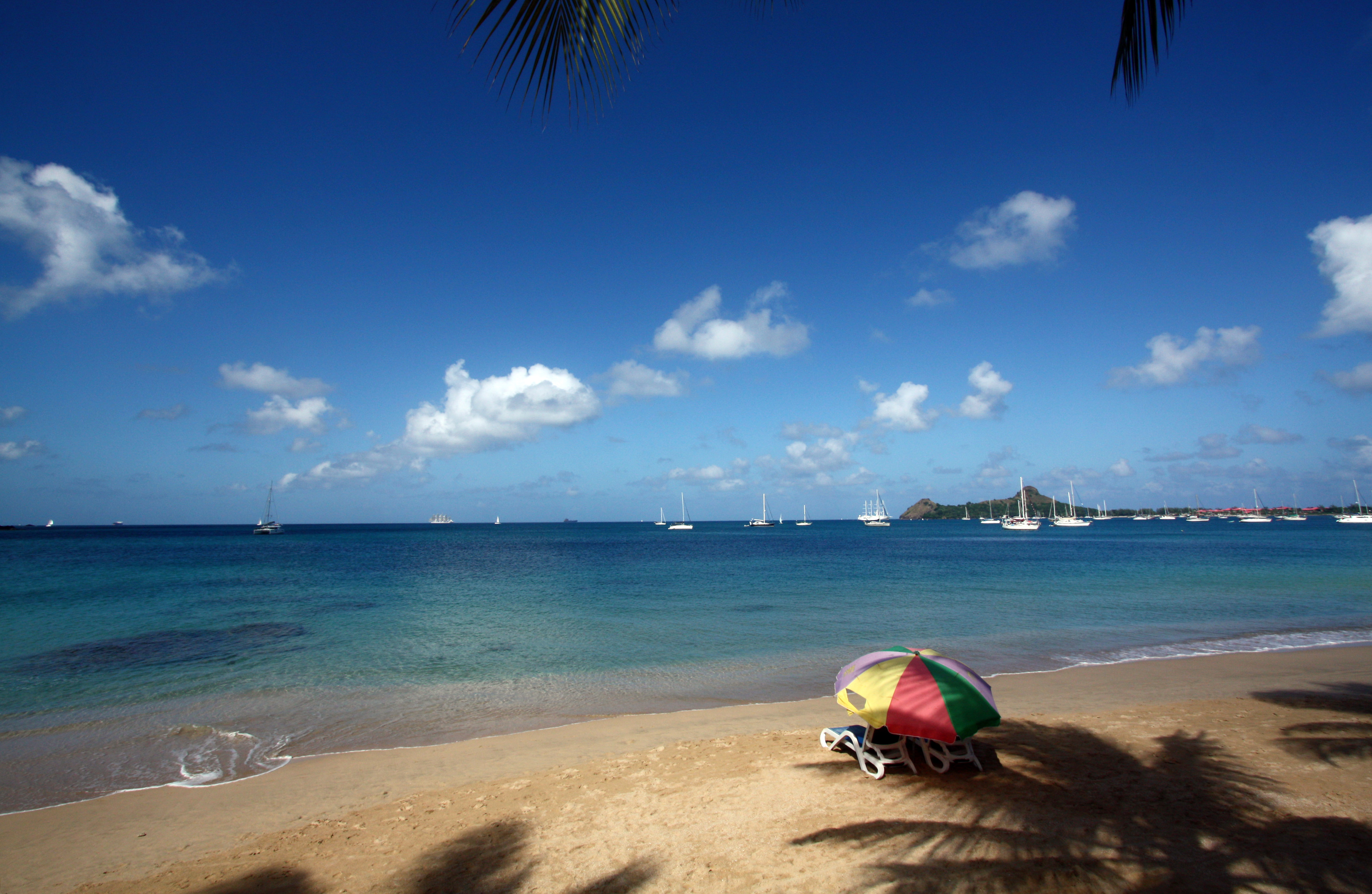

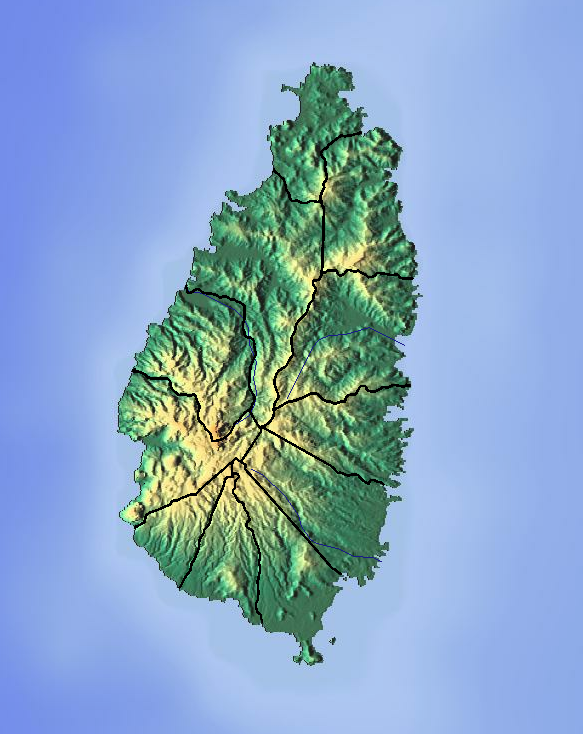
- Location within Saint Lucia
- Location: Gros Islet District, Saint Lucia
- Coordinates: 14°05′N 60°58′W
- Part of: Caribbean Sea

Rodney Bay is a town and bay located in the Gros Islet District on the island of Saint Lucia. Gros Islet is one of the ten districts in the island. It can be found on the northwestern coast of the island above the Castries District, where the capital of St. Lucia is, and the former Dauphin quarter. St. Lucia is a small island in North America located in the Caribbean Sea and it is the largest of the Caribbean's Windward Islands. The Windward islands include Martinique, Saint Vincent and the Grenadines, Barbados, Trinidad and Tobago and Grenada. It is in a chain of islands in the Lesser Antilles with Martinique to the north and Saint Vincent and the Grenadines to the south. These islands are southeast of the islands of Puerto Rico and Haiti. Out of the two airports in St.Lucia, Hewanorra and Charles airport, Rodney Bay is closer to the latter.

== Geography ==
Rodney Bay is horseshoe shaped with a man made lagoon. Reduit Beach is the most popular beach on the island, which tourists love for its cleanliness, length, white sands, and clear water. It also features the Splash Island Water Park with obstacle courses on the water. The bay also includes a Marina that is now the second largest yachting center in the Caribbean sea, under the Yacht Haven Grande in Saint Thomas. The Marina was constructed in 1985 then bought by IGY Marinas in 2007. The Marina has 221 anchorages and 32 mega yacht docks for holding. There is an annual Atlantic Rally for Cruisers in December that attracts around 270 boats and 1200 people. In terms of weather, temperatures are high year round, but the coolest month is in January while the hottest month is in August. It rains mostly in the months of May to December. December is the wettest, while April is the driest month.

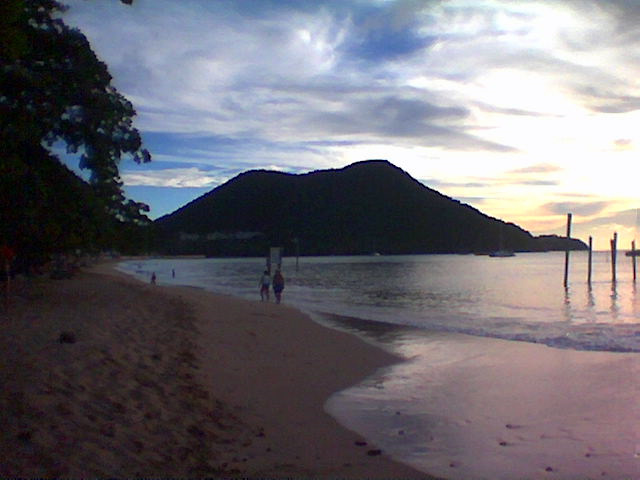
Reduit Beach

== History ==
The Bay was named after Admiral George Brydges Rodney who formed his fort at Pigeon Island. Pigeon island is a national landmark in St.Lucia, declared in 1992 by the St. Lucian government. It's 44 acres and was originally surrounded by water until 1972 when it was artificially joined to the mainland. The island was originally inhabited by the Arawak people who then signed a peace treaty with the French leader Francois Le Clerc. England declared war on France in 1778 and attacked them in St. Lucia and invaded the island. Once they arrived however, Admiral Rodney expelled all the Arawak people and cut down all of the trees on Pigeon island so that he could spy on the French naval base in Martinique. In doing so, he was able to defeat them at the Battle of Saints in 1782. Pigeon Island is now open as a national park 365 days a year to visitors. The landmark still has an 18th-century theme to it while still keeping its natural beauty with its dry rain forests and grasslands. Visitors can learn more about Francois Le Clerc who had an actual wooden leg and they can learn how Pigeon Island was connected to the mainland in 1972. Tourists can also explore the military ruins from Fort Rodney.

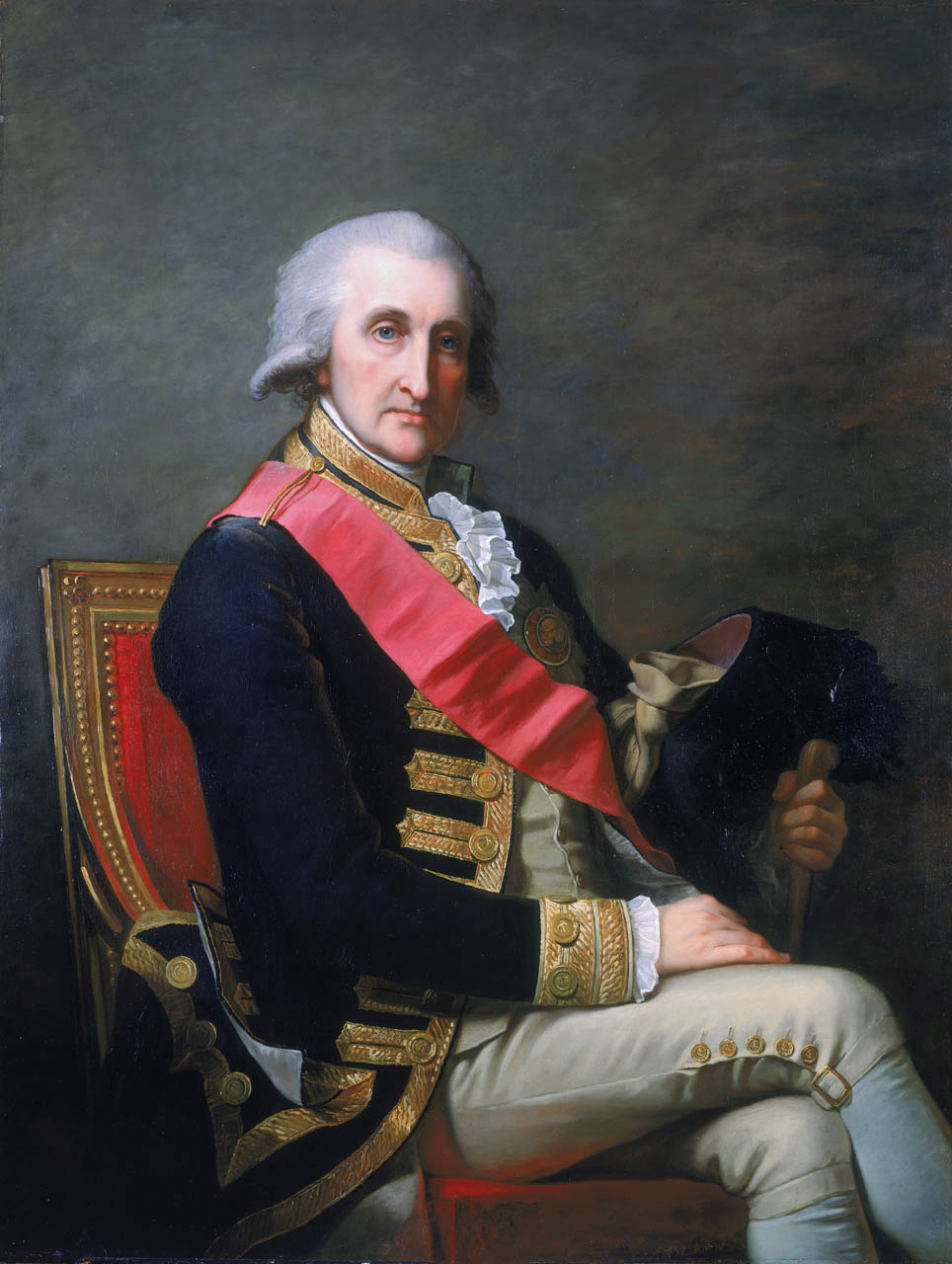
Admiral Rodney

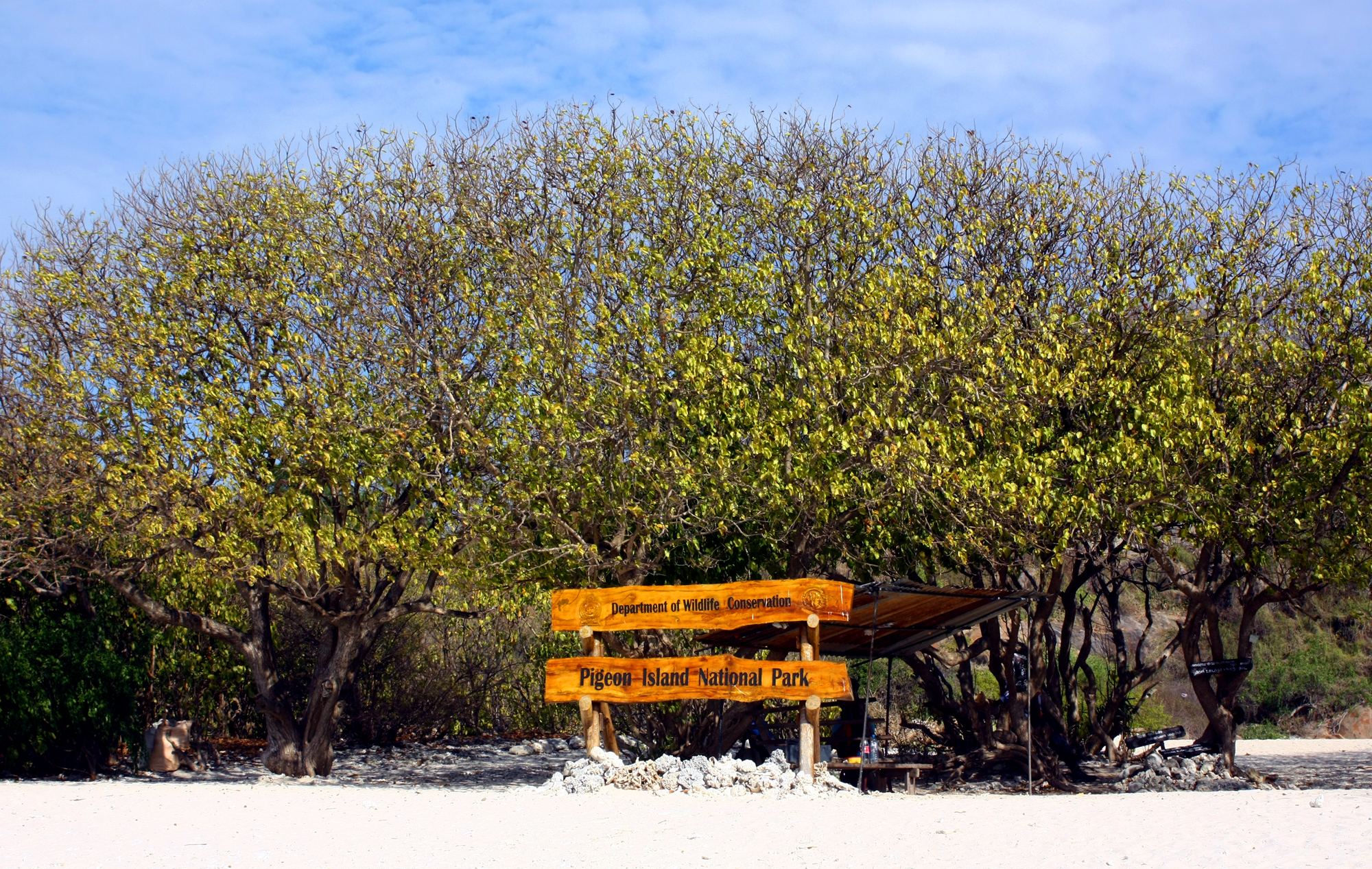
Pigeon Island National Park

== Tourism ==
Rodney Bay is a popular town for tourists, known as St.Lucia’s entertainment and recreation center. It consists of dozens of hotels and rentals to choose from along with the island's two largest shopping malls and the Treasure Bay Casino. It is also known for its variety of food served at the restaurants and cafes. The Spice of India restaurant's food is prepared by experienced Indian chefs. In addition, La Terrasse is a French restaurant that serves, such items as frogs and snails, in a warm setting with local ingredients. On Reduit Beach Ave, there is a strip of nightclubs and restaurants that are a popular part of the island for both tourists and natives. Also available to tourists are spas and therapists who offer activities, such as yoga, reflexology, Ayurvedic massages and restorative therapy. A gallery with works from artists and craftspeople is displayed at the Island Mix Art Emporium. The Union Nature Trail and Zoo displays St.Lucia’s national bird along with a trail through the rain-forest. One particular event that is well known throughout the island is the street party in Gros Islet. It is the longest running party on the island. It happens every Friday night and involves live DJs who play calypso, zouk, reggae, and R&B music and local food is served to the patrons.

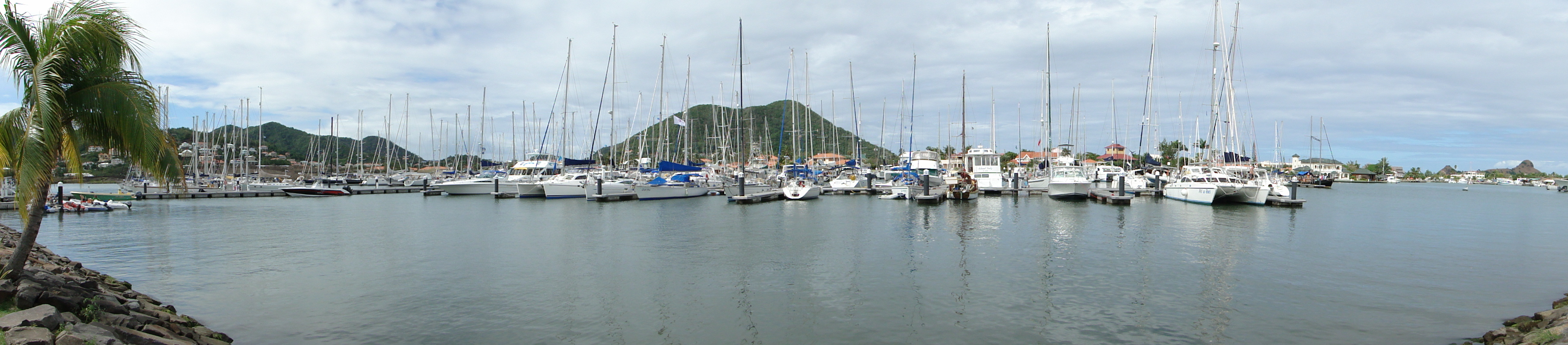
A panorama of Rodney Bay Marina showing Pigeon Island to the right

== See also ==
- Bobo Bergström, Swedish chef and owner of three restaurants in Rodney Bay.
