= Choc =

Choc may refer to:

- Chocolate
- Choc (magazine), a French photography magazine
- Choc (typeface), a typeface by Roger Excoffon
- Choc Bay, in Gros Islet Quarter, Saint Lucia
- Choč Mountains, in north-central Slovakia
- Choc River, in the Soufrière Quarter, Saint Lucia
- Le Choc, a 1982 French film

== People ==
- Anthony Mundine (born 1975), Australian boxer nicknamed Choc
- Choc Sanders (1900–1972), American football player, coach, and teacher
- Juan Choc Chub (died 2012), Guatemalan alleged poacher shot in Belize
- Ramiro Choc (died 2022), Guatemalan Maya leader
- Seriano Choc (died 2002), Belizean shooting victim

== See also ==
- CHOC (disambiguation)
- Choctaw, a community of people
