= Vieux Fort Solar Farm =

Photovoltaic power station in La Tourney, Vieux Fort, Saint Lucia

- Country: Saint Lucia
- Location: La Tourney, Vieux Fort
- Coordinates: 13°44′15″N 60°57′40″W
- Status: Operational
- Construction began: November 2017
- Commission date: April 2018
- Construction cost: US$20 million
- Owner: St. Lucia Electricity Services
- Operator: St. Lucia Electricity Services

Power generation
- Nameplate capacity: 3 MW
- Annual net output: 7,000,000 kWh

The Vieux Fort Solar Farm is a photovoltaic power station in La Tourney, Vieux Fort District, Saint Lucia.

== History ==
In February 2016, St. Lucia Electricity Services (LUCELEC) released a request for proposal to companies to submit bids to construct the power station. The tender was won by GRUPOTEC. On 20 June 2017, LUCELEC and GRUPOTEC signed the contract to begin the engineering, procurement and construction of the power station.

The groundbreaking ceremony for the construction of the power station happened on 29 September 2017 and the construction began in November 2017. It was then commissioned in April 2018, making it the first utility-level renewable energy project completed in the country. The power station was then officially opened on 9 August 2018 in a ceremony attended by Prime Minister Allen Chastanet, former Costa Rica President José María Figueres and former United States President Bill Clinton.

== Technical specification ==
The power station has an installed generating capacity of 3 MW. Upon commissioning, the power station covered around 5% of electricity demand in the country. The power station consists of almost 15,000 photovoltaic panels.

== Finance ==
The power station was constructed at a cost of US$20 million with funds from St. Lucia Electricity Services.
