= Balembouche =

Region, populated place, and plantation in Laborie District Saint Lucia

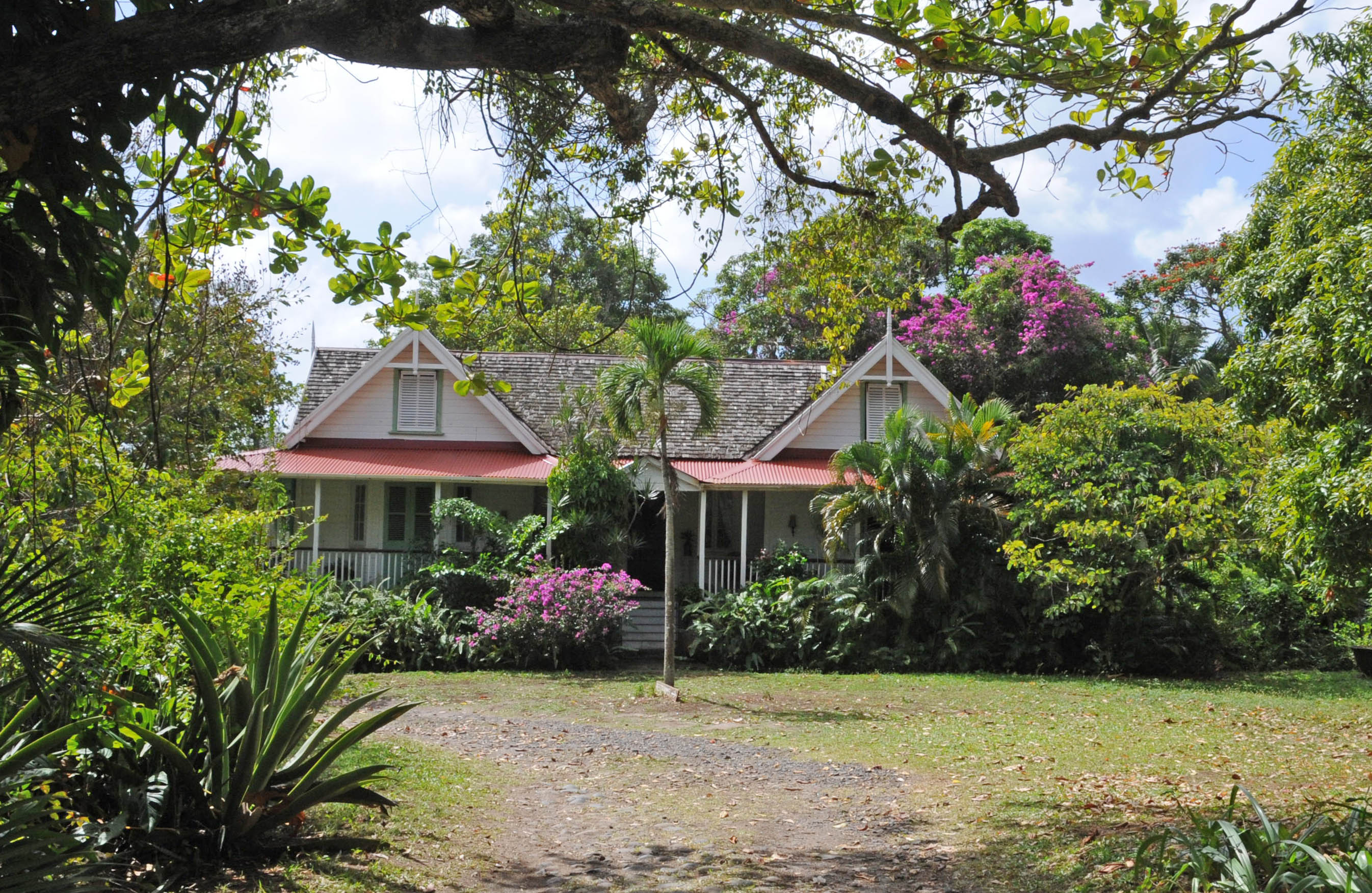
- Balenbouche Estate

- Location in Saint Lucia
- Coordinates: 13°45′27″N 61°01′38″W
- Country: Saint Lucia
- Quarter: Laborie

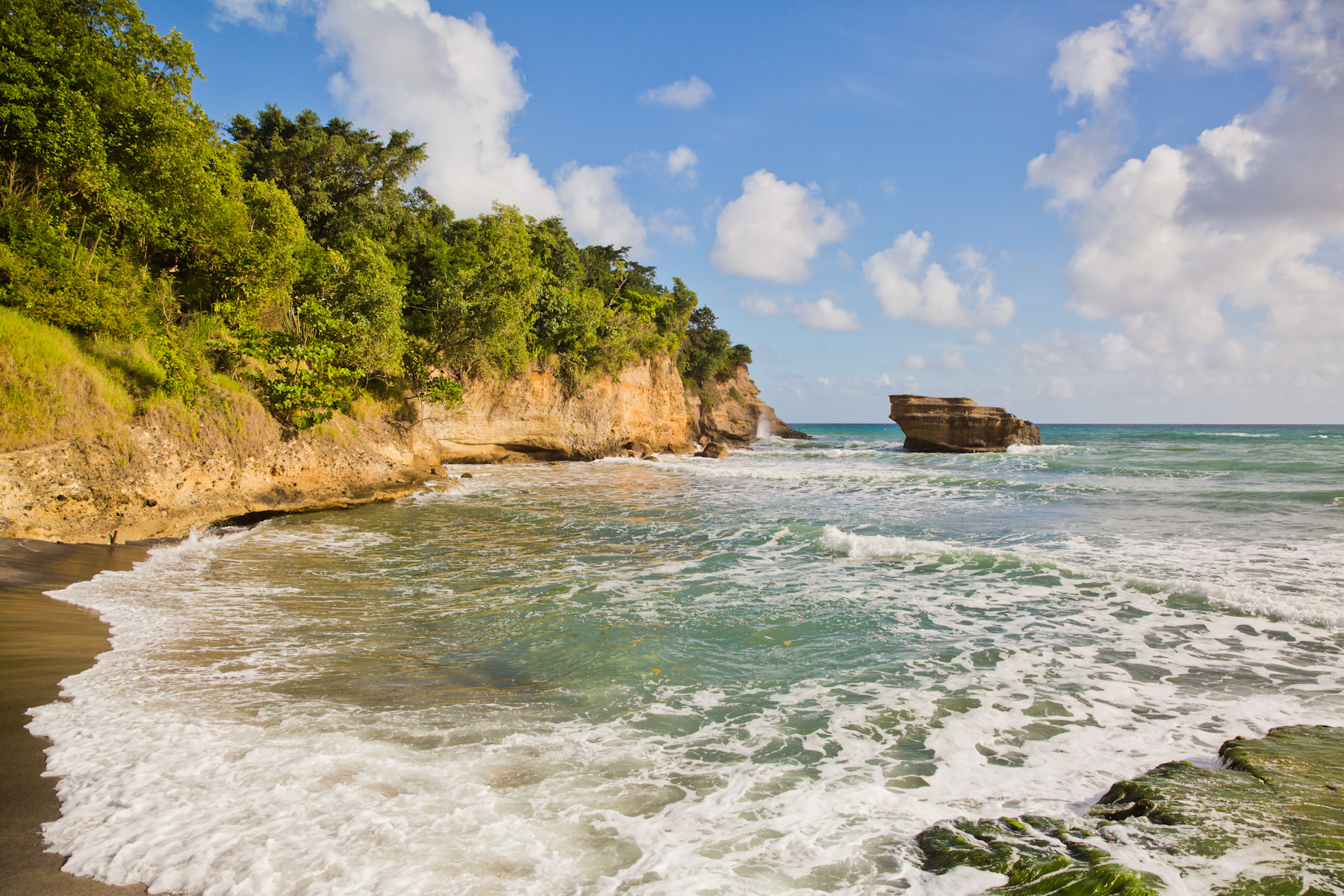
Balembouche Bay

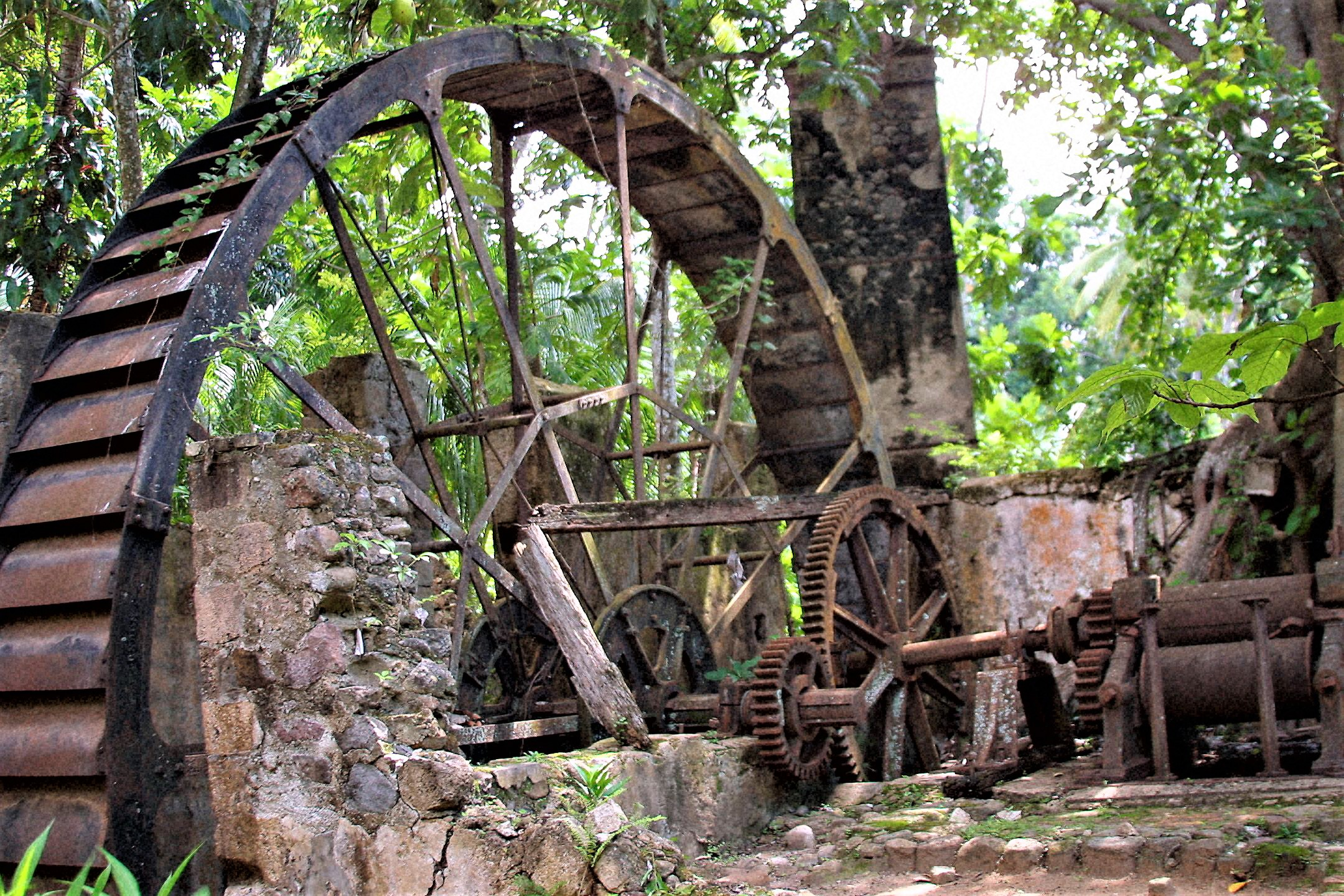
Balembouche sugar mill

Balembouche (also called Balenbouche) is the original name of a historic 18th-century sugar plantation, Balenbouche Estate, which is now a guesthouse, designated heritage site and organic farm on the island of Saint Lucia. It is located on the south west coast of the island, near Bongalo and Piaye.

The entire area where the original 500+ acre estate was historically located is sometimes still referred to as "Balembouche" by locals. However, this is misleading, since those new developments, including an area called "Parc Lane" are no longer or were never part of the original Balembouche plantation.

Historically, there are multiple spellings of the name, all referring to the same sugar plantation established by the French under colonial rule. Some alternate spellings include Ballembouche, Balambouche, and Balenbouche. The name first appears on St. Lucia maps in the late 1760s.

The exact origin of the name Balembouche or Balenbouche is not known. Possible translations include "mouth of the whale" from the French "Baleine" and "bouche" and also "bullet or ball in the mouth" from the French phrase "bal en bouche."

The current size of the estate is 80 acres or 30 hectares. The property, which is largely left undeveloped, is owned by the Lawaetz family who purchased the land in the 1960s. The northern boundary is the main road, and the southern boundary is the Caribbean sea. To the west, there is a residential development. The eastern boundary of the estate is the Balembouche River, which ends at the Balembouche Bay (Anse Balembouche).

Archeological remains at Balembouche Estate include Amerindian artifacts and petroglyphs along the Balembouche River.

Historically, the "Chemin Royal" one of the first roads build by the French traversed the Balembouche Estate and crossed the river at the mouth. This was back then the easiest place to cross since the river is in a deep canyon. From this river is also derived the historic Balembouche aqueduct, a 200-year-old waterway with a 30-ft dam, built in the late 1700s to power the waterwheel at the Balembouche sugar mill. It is one of the only two remaining intact aqueducts on the island and has been maintained privately by the owners of Balenbouche estate for the past half a century.

Since 2019, the aqueduct has been dry. Discussions are ongoing with the authorities and neighbours to restore the flow of water to the local farmers and ecosystems. Crops and livestock raised the estate include cattle, coconuts, breadfruit, papaya and organic vegetables. The estate also has an abundance of flora and fauna, including over 30 documented bird species.

== Other sites ==
Balembouche is also a second-order administrative division of Laborie District with a population of 16. There is also a Balembouche River, Balembouche Bay, and Balembouche Rocks in Laborie District.

== See also ==
- List of cities in Saint Lucia
- List of rivers of Saint Lucia
