= Piaye =

- Location in the Laborie District of Saint Lucia
- Coordinates: 13°45′N 061°01′W
- Country: Saint Lucia
- District: Laborie District

Population
  - Total: 596
- Piaye 2nd-order administrative division

Piaye is a community on the island of Saint Lucia; it is located on the southern coast, near Balembouche and Bongalo in the Laborie District, and shares its name with a nearby river. This community started as a small settlement of workers who laboured on the Balembouche estate. In the post-Balembouche period Piaye transformed into a community of fishermen, subsistence farmers and producers of hand-crushed aggregate for the construction industry.

== See also ==
- List of cities in Saint Lucia
- Districts of Saint Lucia
- Piaye River
- Piaye Bay (Anse Piaye)
