= CHOC =

CHOC may mean:

- CHOC (magazine), a Pan-Arabian women's magazine
- The Cambridge History of China
- Canadian House of Commons, a common name for the House of Commons of Canada
- Children's Hospital of Orange County, California, USA
- Chocolate agar
- CHOC-FM, a radio station in Saint-Raymond, Quebec, Canada
- CHOC-FM (Saint-Rémi, Quebec), a former community radio station in Saint-Rémi, Quebec, Canada

== See also ==
- Choc (disambiguation)
