= Bongalo =

- Location in Saint Lucia
- Coordinates: 13°45′N 061°01′W
- Country: Saint Lucia
- Quarter: Laborie

Bongalo is a community on the island of Saint Lucia; it is located on the southern coast, near Balembouche and Piaye.
