= Verdure =

Verdure may refer to:

- Heath
- La Verdure River
- Vegetation
- Tapestries with landscape subjects
