= Mahaut River (Saint Lucia) =

River in Saint Lucia

Mahaut River Mahaut
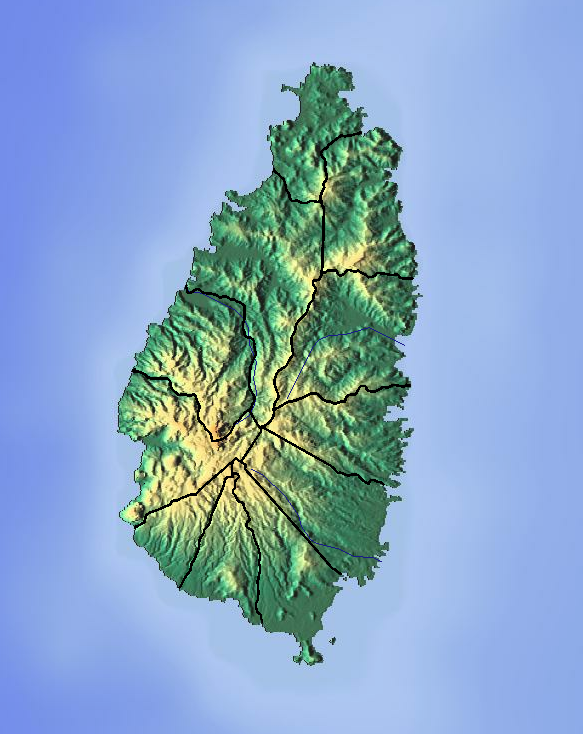
- Location of mouth

Location
- Country: Saint Lucia
- Region: Soufrière Quarter

Physical characteristics
- Mouth: Caribbean Sea
  - coordinates: 13°53′32″N 61°04′25″W

The Mahaut River is a river in the Laborie Quarter of Saint Lucia. The mouth is at the Caribbean Sea.

== See also ==
- List of rivers of Saint Lucia

== Note ==
Mahaut River should not be confused with the stream Ravine Mahout in Laborie Quarter at 13°47′02″N 61°00′43″W

== Bibliography ==
- Higgins, Chris (2001). St. Lucia. Montreal: Ulysses Travel Guides. ISBN 2-89464-396-9.
