= Balembouche River =

River in Saint Lucia

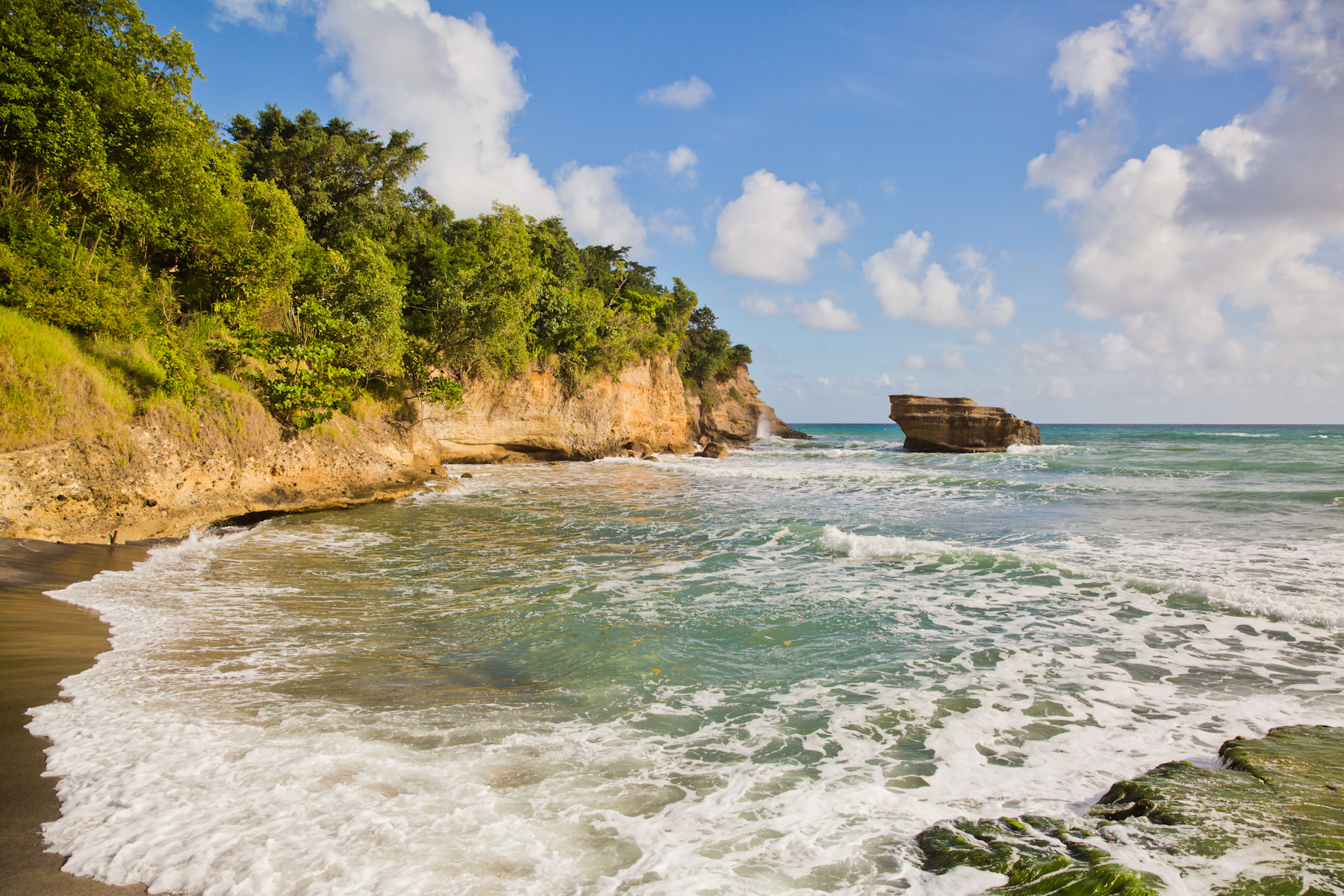
- Balembouche Bay

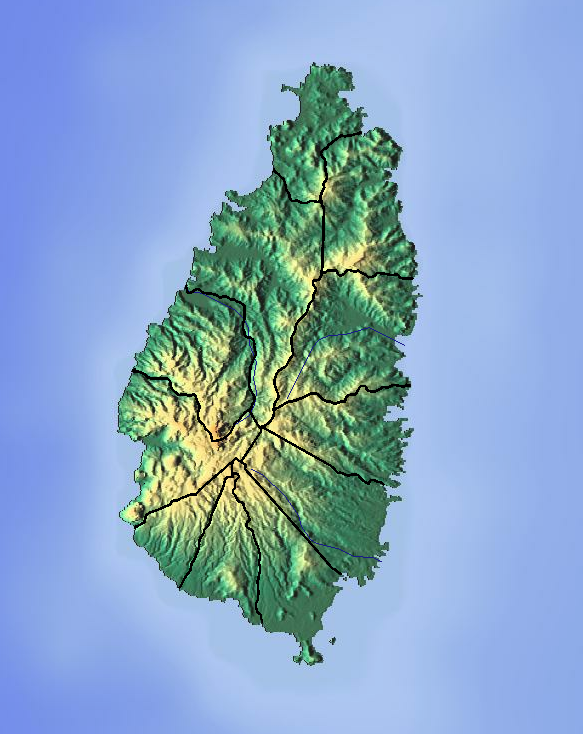
- Location of mouth

Location
- Country: Saint Lucia
- Region: Laborie Quarter

Physical characteristics
- Mouth: Caribbean Sea
  - coordinates: 13°45′15″N 61°01′32″W
  - elevation: Sea level

The Balembouche River is a coastal river in Laborie Quarter, Saint Lucia that flows into the Caribbean Sea.

== See also ==
- List of rivers of Saint Lucia
- Balembouche (plantation, populated place, bay)
