= Canaries District =

District of the island nation of Saint Lucia

- District
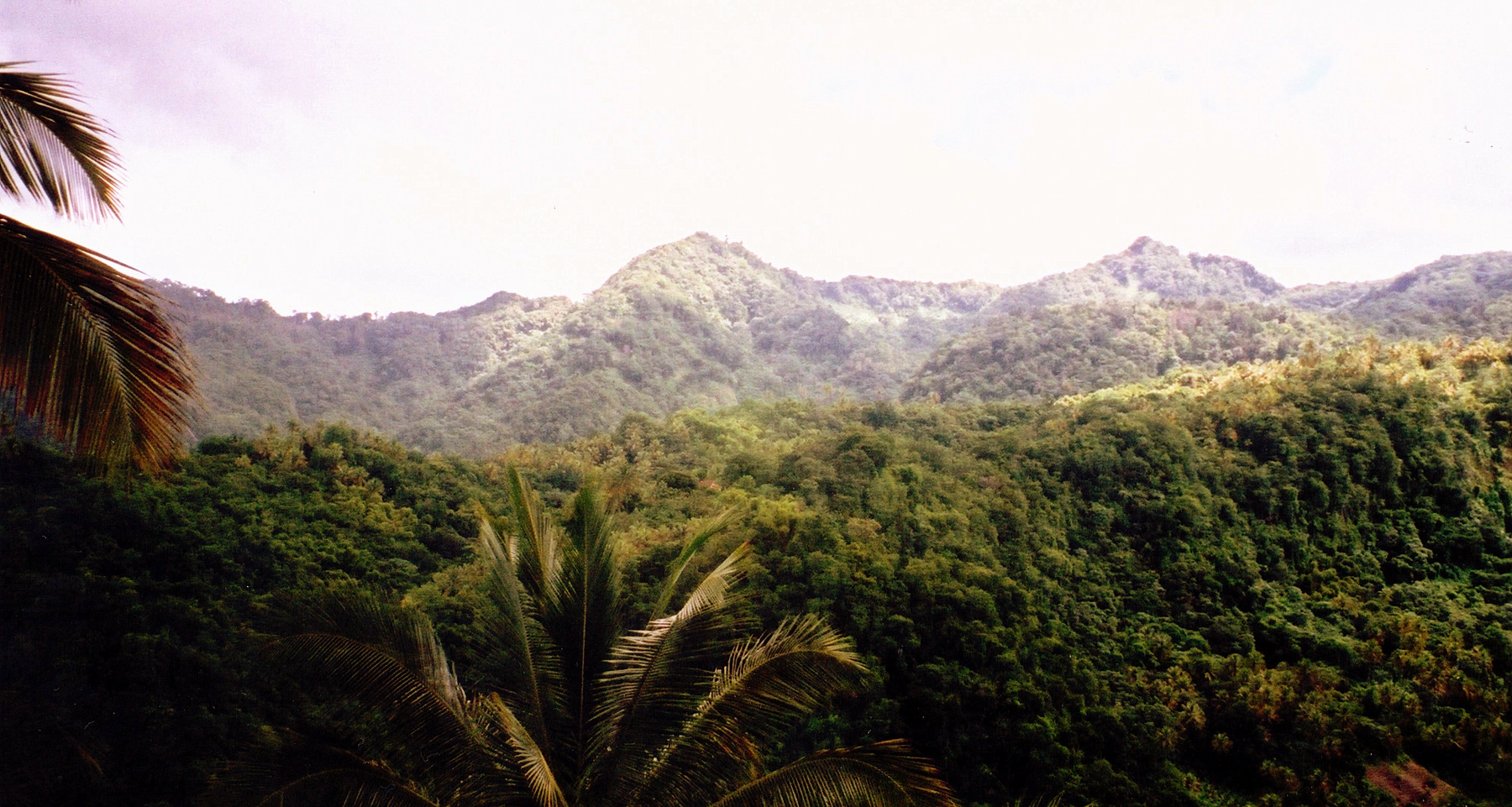
- Rain forest in Canaries District

- Location of Canaries District within Saint Lucia
- Coordinates (Town of Canaries): 13°54′16″N 061°04′01″W
- Country: Saint Lucia

Area
  - Total: 16 km^{2} (6.2 sq mi)

Population (2010)
  - Total: 2,009
  - Density: 130/km^{2} (330/sq mi)
- ISO 3166-2:LC: LC-12

Canaries District is one of 10 districts (formerly called quarters) of the island nation of St. Lucia in the Caribbean Sea. In 2010, the population of the region was 2,009 people, and they are mainly fishers and agricultural workers. The main town in the area takes the same name as the district and is located down the western coast from Castries, the capital of the country. It is the smallest district of Saint Lucia, both by population and area.

== History ==
The name Kanawe is derived from the Amerindian word for cooking pots, in the past Canaries had a large sugar plantation that ran inland up the valley that stretches in an easterly direction from the village. Records show that Canaries has existed since 1763 and the original settlers came from the neighboring island of Martinique.

== Geography ==
There are eight rivers in Canaries Quarter:

- Anse La Verdure River, 13°55′12″N 61°03′35″W
- Canaries River, 13°54′18″N 61°04′08″W
- Anse Cochon River, 13°55′36″N 61°03′24″W
- Ravine Chalon, 13°55′31″N 61°03′10″W
- Ravine Joseph, 13°55′07″N 61°03′22″W
- Ravine Combat, 13°54′30″N 61°02′49″W
- Ravine Tertillien, 13°54′30″N 61°02′50″W
- Ravine Parasol, 13°54′31″N 61°02′52″W

The following coves, points and bays (Anse) are in the Canaries Quarter:

- Anse des Canaries, 13°54′35″N 61°04′01″W
- Ane la Voutte, 13°55′01″N 61°03′50″W
- Anse Cochon, 13°55′39″N 61°03′29″W
- Anse la Verdure, 13°55′12″N 61°03′39″W
- Petit Trou, 13°55′23″N 61°03′36″W
- Point la Ville, 13°56′02″N 61°03′30″W

The following mountains are in the quarter:

- Mount Regnier, 13°54′18″N 61°03′03″W, 373 m (1,224 ft)
- Mount Parasol, 13°54′41″N 61°02′35″W, 408 m (1,339 ft)
- Mount Morton, 13°53′25″N 61°01′44″W, 473 m (1,552 ft)
- Mount Marquis, 13°53′57″N 61°02′04″W, 461 m (1,512 ft)
- Mount Houelmon, 13°53′09″N 61°01′13″W, 531 m (1,742 ft)
- Mount Gimie, 13°51′48″N 61°00′40″W, at 950 m (3,120 ft) is the tallest mountain in Saint Lucia

The Grand Bois Forest Nature Reserve is located within the quarter at 13°53′19″N 61°01′26″W.

== Populated places ==
There are three towns in Canaries Quarter:

- Canaries, Saint Lucia, 13°54′18″N 61°04′01″W
- Theodorine, 13°55′33″N 61°02′52″W
- Anse La Verdure, 13°54′41″N 61°03′22″W

There are two estates and one locality in the Canaries Quarter:

- Anse La Verdure Estate, 13°54′52″N 61°03′03″W
- Chantin Estate, 13°55′15″N 61°02′09″W
- Saurot locality, 13°55′10″N 61°02′39″W

== Government ==
The seat of the Canaries District is the town of Canaries.

The Canaries District is represented in the House of Assembly of Saint Lucia by the Honorable Wayne D. Girard, Parliamentary Representative for the Anse La Raye/Canaries electoral constituency.

== See also ==
- Geography of Saint Lucia
- List of cities in Saint Lucia
- List of rivers of Saint Lucia
- Districts of Saint Lucia
