= Canaries, Saint Lucia =

Canaries
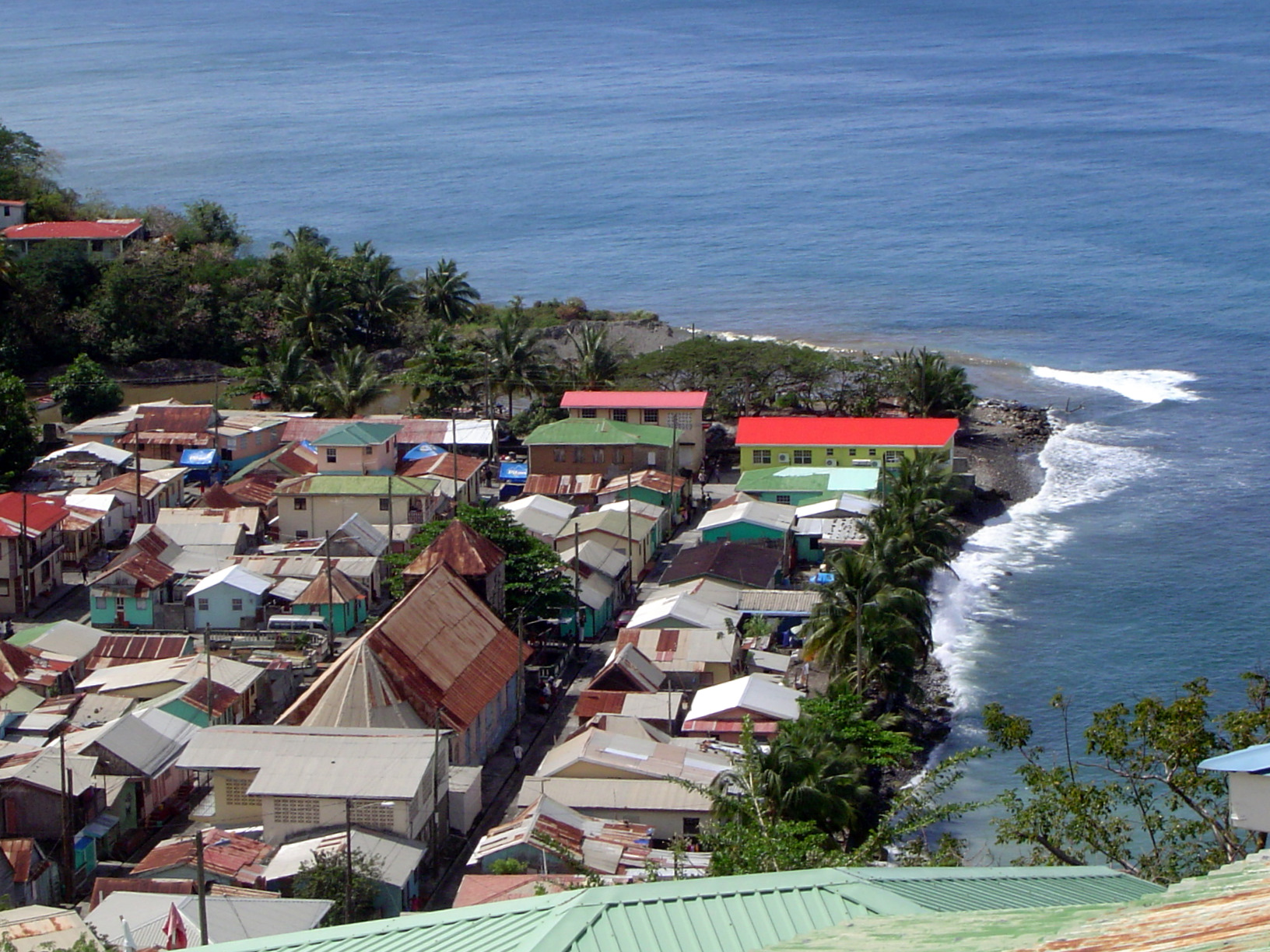
- Canaries

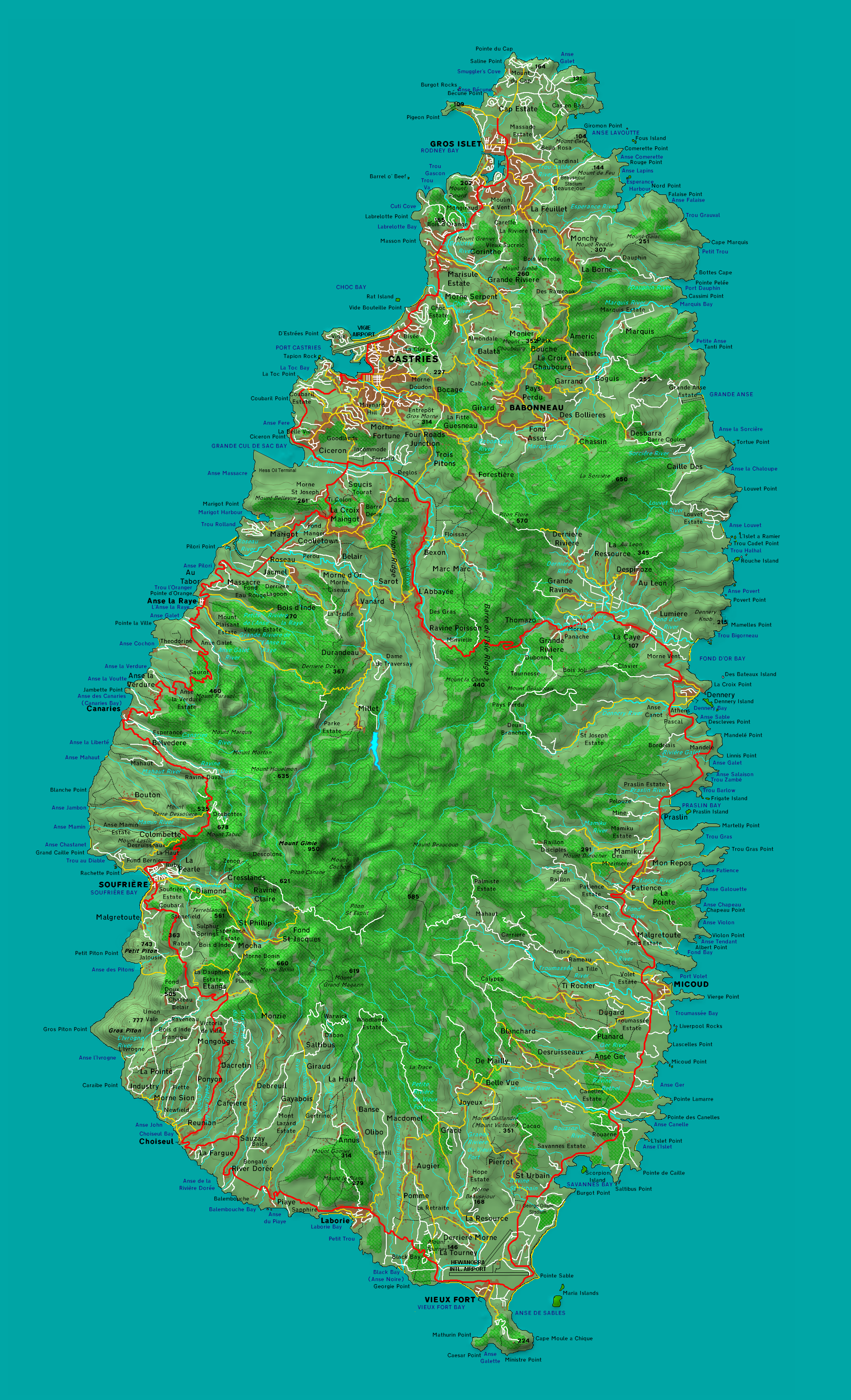
- Detailed map of St Lucia showing location of Canaries

- Location in Saint Lucia
- Coordinates: 13°54′16″N 061°04′01″W
- Country: Saint Lucia
- Quarter: Canaries Quarter
- Founded: 18th Century
- Founder: The French
- Named for: Kannawi, creole word for Amerindian cooking pots

Government
  - Governing body: Canaries Village Council

Area
  - Total: 16 km^{2} (6.2 sq mi)
- Elevation: 5 m (16 ft)

Population (2005)
  - Total: 1,862
  - Density: 120/km^{2} (300/sq mi)
- Time zone: UTC-4 (Eastern Caribbean Time Zone (ECT))
- Area code: 758

Canaries (or Kanawe in Creole) is a populated place located on the West Coast of Saint Lucia in the Canaries Quarter (also called district or region). It is a small fishing village and it is nestled along the West Coast road, between the towns of Anse La Raye and Soufriere, and there are scenic views from both the Northern and Southern approaches.

== History ==
Until the 1960s there was no road transport to the village and it was only accessible by boat. Since the construction of the West Coast Road it is a stop on the road between Castries and Soufriere.

The name Kanawe is derived from the Amerindian word for cooking pots, in the past Canaries had a large sugar plantation that ran inland up the valley that stretches in an easterly direction from the village. Records show that Canaries has existed since 1763 and the original settlers came from the neighbouring island of Martinique.

In 1876 a Catholic School was established and after 1929 there was an infant school and a junior school in the village.

When the price of sugar dropped in the middle of the 20th Century, the estate closed and many people left for England to look for work. Many sent money back to their families and since then many local businesses have appeared.

== See also ==
- List of rivers of Saint Lucia
- List of cities in Saint Lucia
- Quarters of Saint Lucia
- Geography of Saint Lucia
