= Gordon Hazlewood =

Dean of Barbados from 1951 to 1971

- Born: Gordon Vivian Elton Hazlewood
- Education: Codrington College
- Years active: 1951–1971
- Known for: Dean of Barbados

Gordon Vivian Elton Hazlewood was the Dean of Barbados from 1951 until 1971.

He was educated at Codrington College and ordained in 1916. After curacies at Kingstown and Carriacou he was the Rector of Rivière Dorée until his appointment as Dean.
