= Cul De Sac Power Station =

Power station in Castries, Saint Lucia

- Country: Saint Lucia
- Location: Castries
- Coordinates: 13°58′35.9″N 61°0′26.9″W
- Status: Operational
- Commission date: 1990
- Owner: St. Lucia Electricity Services
- Operator: St. Lucia Electricity Services

Power generation
- Nameplate capacity: 87.4 MW

The Cul De Sac Power Station is a power station in Castries, Saint Lucia. It is the only power station in the country.

== History ==
The power station was commissioned in 1990. It replaces the previous two power stations in Union and Vieux Fort.

== Technical specification ==
The power station has an installed generation of 87.4 MW with an installed capacity of 86.2 MW. The outgoing of the power station goes to seven electrical substations. The type of fuel used is diesel. Power is generated from 3 MAK engines which each had a capacity of 6 - 7 MW and seven Wärtsilä units; four 9.3 MW and three 10.2MW units.

== See also ==
- Economy of Saint Lucia
