= Vieux Fort, Saint Lucia =

Vieux Fort (town)
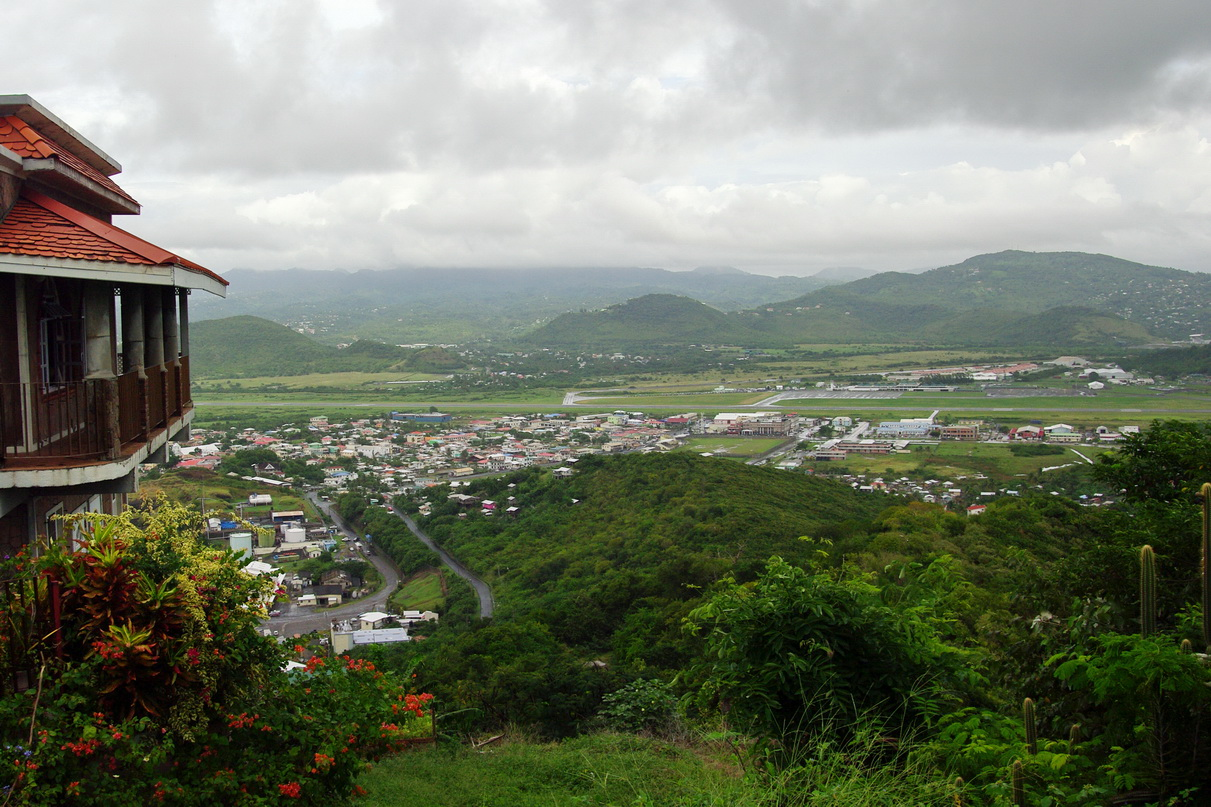
- Vieux Fort

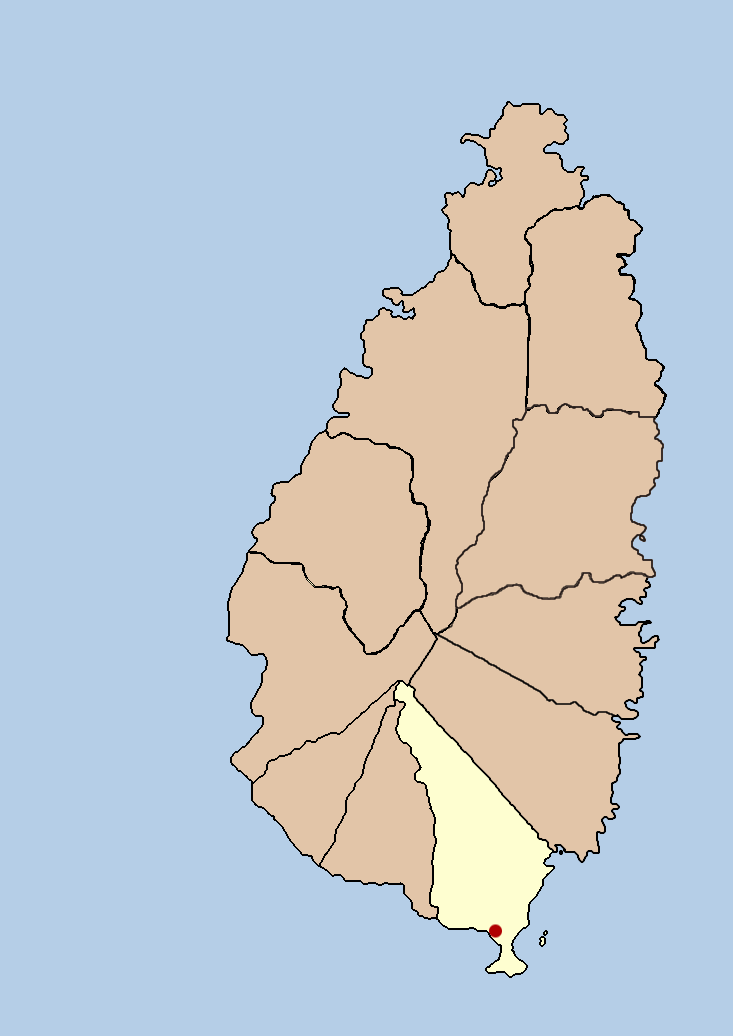
- Map of Saint Lucia showing location of Vieux Fort District and the town of Vieux Fort
- Coordinates: 13.728°N 60.954°W
- Country: Saint Lucia
- District: Vieux Fort District
- Founded: 18th Century
- Named for: A nearby fort

Government
  - Governing body: Vieux Fort Council
- Elevation: 1 m (3.3 ft)

Population (2005)
  - Total: 15,750 (District)4,574 (town)
- Time zone: UTC-4 (Eastern Caribbean Time Zone (ECT))
- Area code: 758

Vieux Fort is a town located near the southernmost point of Saint Lucia, a Caribbean island nation. It is named after a fort that used to watch out over Saint Vincent toward the south. The population of the town was 4,574 in 2000 while the surrounding district of Vieux Fort has a total population of about 15,132 in 2010.

== History ==
In the 18th and 19th centuries it was an important centre of the sugar industry in Saint Lucia, before that industry declined.

During World War II, the Americans constructed an airfield called Beane Army Airfield. After the war it was subsequently expanded to form Hewanorra International Airport.

Today, Vieux Fort is the main point of entry for Saint Lucia, and also hosts a port just to the south of the town. It is also a major industrial area, and also hosts other places, such as the St Jude Hospital, as well as George Odlum Stadium.

== Climate ==
Climate data for Hewanorra International Airport (1991–2020)
Month	Jan	Feb	Mar	Apr	May	Jun	Jul	Aug	Sep	Oct	Nov	Dec	Year
Mean daily maximum °C (°F)	29.2 (84.6)	29.2 (84.6)	29.6 (85.3)	30.3 (86.5)	30.9 (87.6)	30.9 (87.6)	30.9 (87.6)	31.2 (88.2)	31.5 (88.7)	31.2 (88.2)	30.5 (86.9)	29.8 (85.6)	30.4 (86.7)
Daily mean °C (°F)	26.5 (79.7)	26.5 (79.7)	26.8 (80.2)	27.5 (81.5)	28.3 (82.9)	28.3 (82.9)	28.3 (82.9)	28.4 (83.1)	28.4 (83.1)	28.2 (82.8)	27.7 (81.9)	27.1 (80.8)	27.7 (81.9)
Mean daily minimum °C (°F)	23.9 (75.0)	23.7 (74.7)	24.0 (75.2)	24.8 (76.6)	25.7 (78.3)	25.8 (78.4)	25.7 (78.3)	25.6 (78.1)	25.4 (77.7)	25.2 (77.4)	24.9 (76.8)	24.4 (75.9)	24.9 (76.8)
Average precipitation mm (inches)	84.7 (3.33)	50.7 (2.00)	56.9 (2.24)	84.4 (3.32)	69.9 (2.75)	136.3 (5.37)	153.5 (6.04)	167.1 (6.58)	186.2 (7.33)	217.4 (8.56)	191.2 (7.53)	99.2 (3.91)	1,497.5 (58.96)
Average precipitation days (≥ 1 mm)	13.4	9.8	9.4	8.8	9.7	14.1	17.5	16.7	14.5	16.1	15.9	14.0	160.0
Mean monthly sunshine hours	278.3	265.4	282.7	279.0	287.0	252.2	274.3	277.2	257.9	252.7	246.2	272.2	3,225.2
Source: National Oceanic and Atmospheric Administration

== See also ==
- List of cities in Saint Lucia
- List of rivers of Saint Lucia
- Vieux Fort District (formerly Quarter)
- Vieux Fort River
