= Black Bay River (Saint Lucia) =

River of Saint Lucia

Black Bay River Anse Noire River
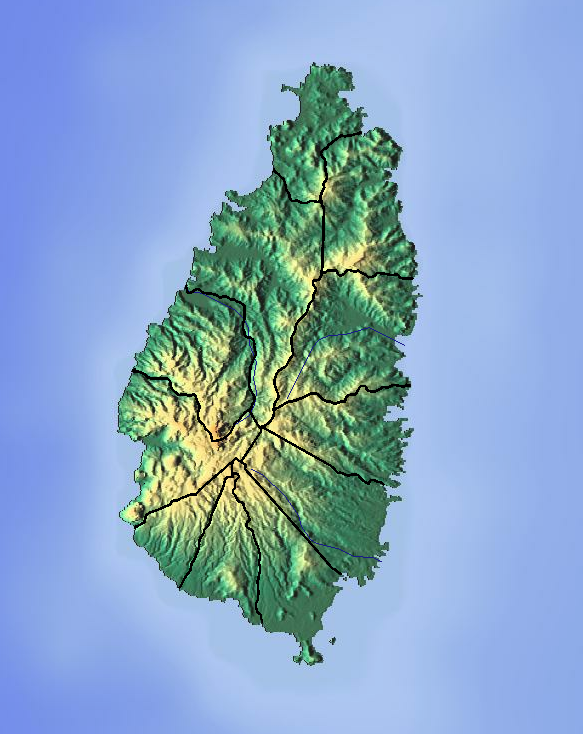
- Location of mouth

Location
- Country: Saint Lucia
- Quarter: Vieux Fort Quarter

Physical characteristics
- Mouth: Caribbean Sea
  - coordinates: 13°44′11″N 60°58′51″W

The Black Bay River is a river in Vieux Fort Quarter of the island nation of Saint Lucia.

== See also ==
- List of rivers of Saint Lucia
