= Trou Sallé River =

River of Saint Lucia

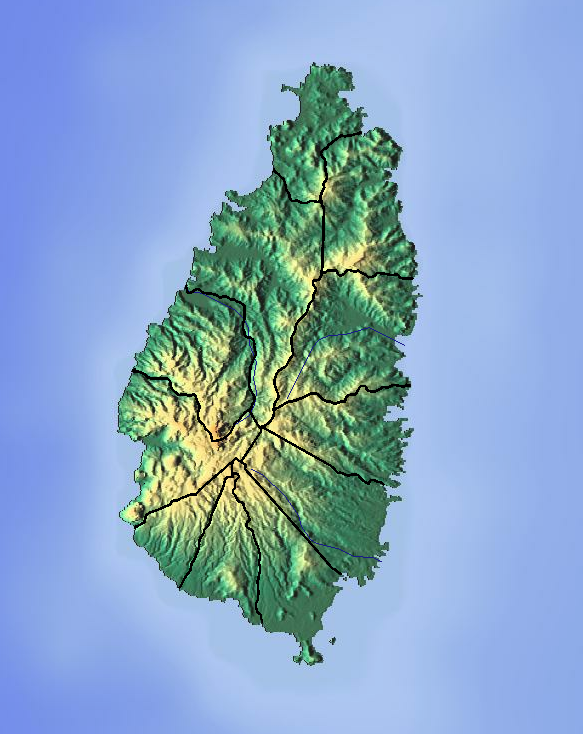
- Location of mouth

Location
- Country: Saint Lucia
- Region: Gros Islet Quarter

Physical characteristics
- Mouth: Atlantic Ocean
  - coordinates: 14°04′46″N 60°55′12″W
  - elevation: Sea level

The Trou Sallé River is a river of Saint Lucia.

== See also ==
- List of rivers of Saint Lucia
