= Laborie =

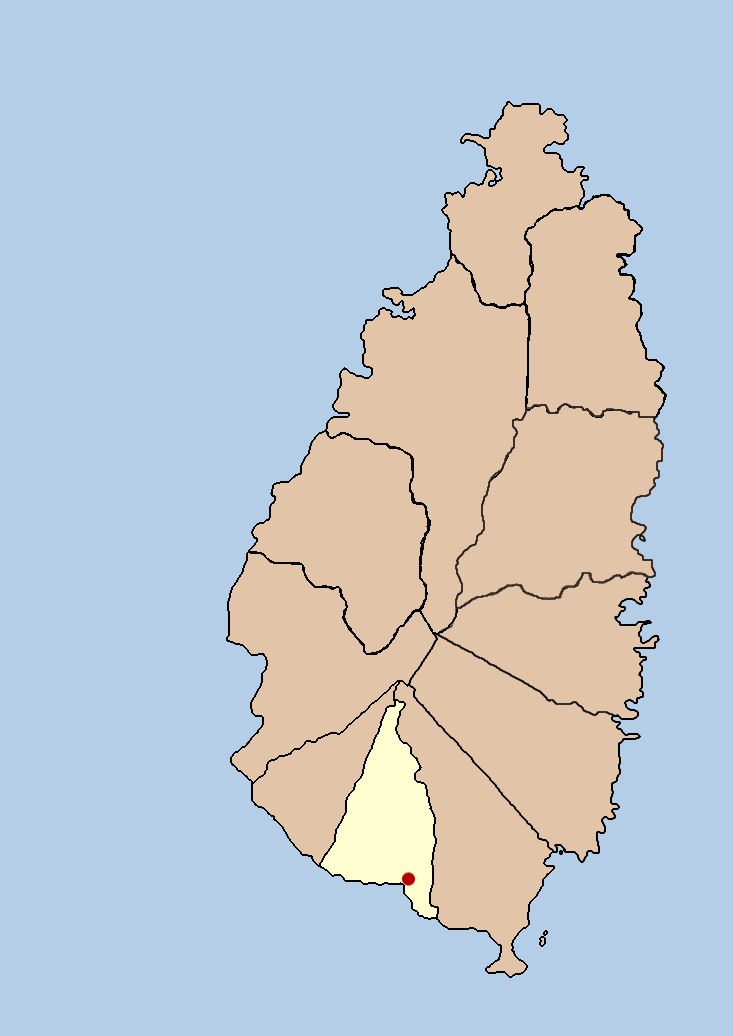
- Political map of St Lucia showing location of Laborie in Laborie District
- Coordinates: 13°45′05″N 60°59′42″W
- Country: Saint Lucia
- District: Laborie District
- Founded: 18th Century
- Original name: l'Islet a Caret
- Founder: The French
- Named for: Barron Jean Zénon André de Véron de Laborie, governor of Saint Lucia 1784–1789

Government
  - Governing body: Laborie Village Council
- Elevation: 20 m (66 ft)

Population (2010)
  - Total: 1,131
- Time zone: UTC-4 (Eastern Caribbean Time Zone (ECT))
- Area code: 758
- Website: www.ilovelaborie.com

Laborie is a village on the south coast of Saint Lucia. It was originally called l'Islet a Caret after the Loggerhead sea turtles that were found in the area. The name Laborie is named after Baron de Laborie who was the French governor of Saint Lucia from 1784 to 1789. At that time the village had a population of 712. Laborie is the seat of the Laborie District.

== History ==
The French introduced large estates to the island and after the British took control of the island in 1814, many French landowners remained on their estates.

In 1838 the first school was opened. Known as the "Mico School" because it was opened and operated by the Lady Mico Trust, it had 80 pupils and lasted until 1891. By this time a Catholic school had opened in the village.

In 1907, the 18th Century church was replaced by a larger church which opened in 1914.

During World War II, American forces opened a radar station on the hill of Morne le Blanc to help protect the airfield that is now Hewanorra International Airport. The remnants are still visible today.

The Creole heritage is still visible today, both in the local culture and in the Saint Lucian Creole French language that is still widely spoken.

== See also ==
- List of cities in Saint Lucia
- Districts of Saint Lucia
