= Mamin River =

River in Saint Lucia

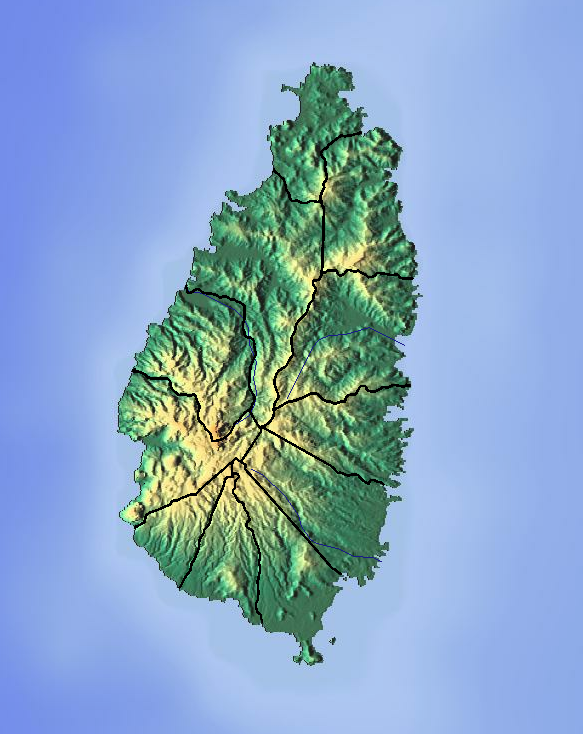
- Location of mouth

Location
- Country: Saint Lucia
- Region: Soufrière Quarter

Physical characteristics
- Mouth: Caribbean Sea
  - coordinates: 13°52′15″N 61°04′43″W

The Mamin River is a river of Saint Lucia.

== See also ==
- List of rivers of Saint Lucia
