= Migny River =

River of Saint Lucia

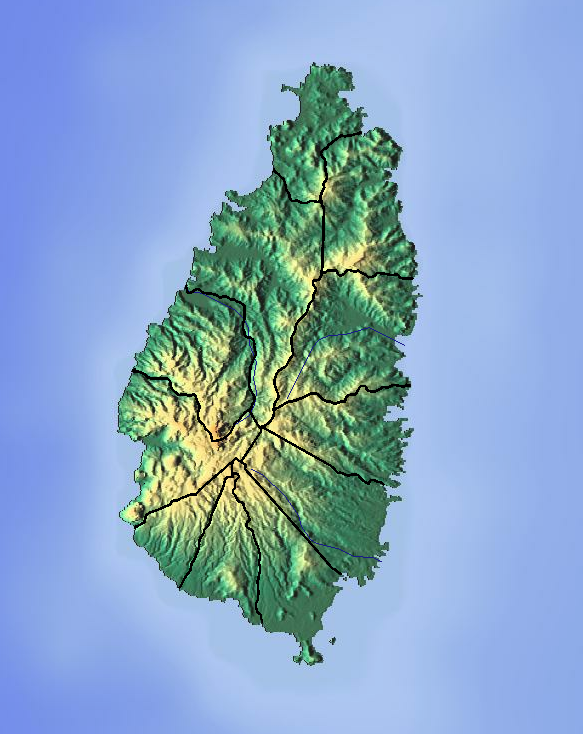
- Location of mouth

Location
- Country: Saint Lucia
- Region: Soufrière Quarter

Physical characteristics
- Mouth
  - coordinates: 13°51′13″N 61°02′11″W

The Migny River is a river on the island of Saint Lucia.

== See also ==
- List of rivers of Saint Lucia
