= Trou Barbet River =

River in Saint Lucia

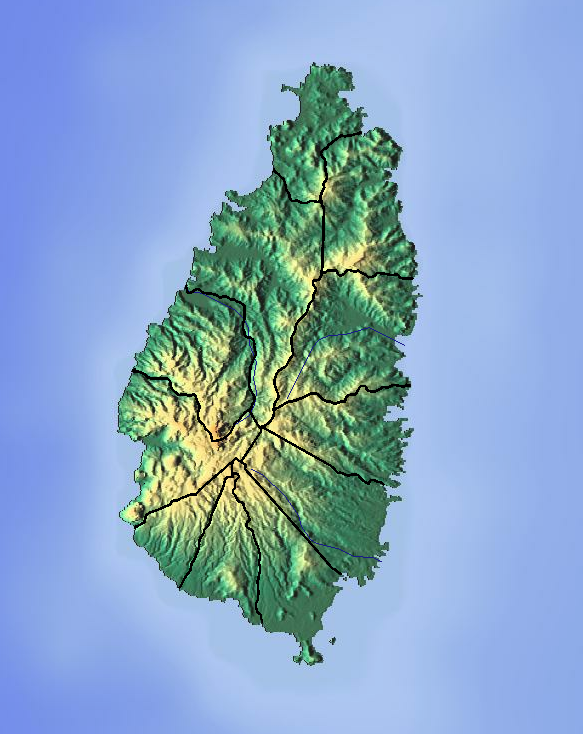
- Location of mouth

Location
- Country: Saint Lucia
- Region: Choiseul Quarter

Physical characteristics
- Mouth: Caribbean Sea
  - coordinates: 13°46′42″N 61°03′08″W
  - elevation: Sea level

The Trou Barbet River is a river of Saint Lucia.

== See also ==
- List of rivers of Saint Lucia
