= Fond River =

River of Saint Lucia

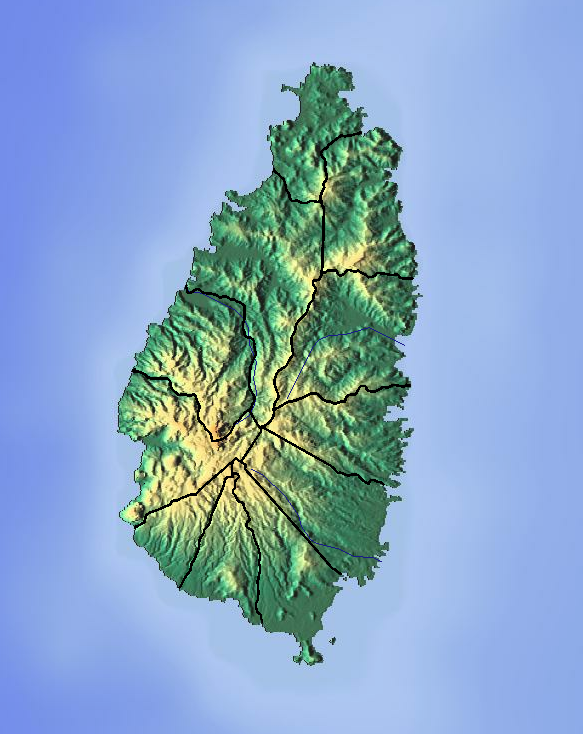
- Location of mouth

Location
- Country: Saint Lucia
- Region: Micoud Quarter

Physical characteristics
- Mouth: Atlantic Ocean
  - coordinates: 13°50′N 60°53′W

The Fond River is a river of Saint Lucia.

== See also ==
- List of rivers of Saint Lucia
