= Vieux Fort River =

River of Saint Lucia

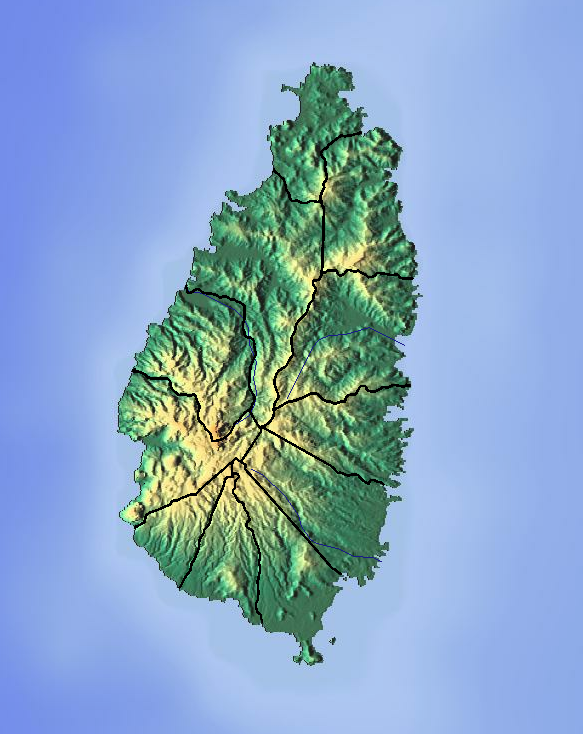
- Location of mouth

Location
- Country: Saint Lucia
- Quarter: Vieux Fort Quarter

Physical characteristics
- Mouth: Vieux Fort Bay, Caribbean Sea
  - coordinates: 13°43′50″N 60°58′07″W

The Vieux Fort River is a river in Saint Lucia. It flows south-southeast, reaching the coast close to the country's southernmost point at the town of Vieux Fort. It is named after a fort that used to watch out towards Saint Vincent towards the south. Since the colonial period, it has been a source of fresh water for the area. The Petit Rivière du Vieux Fort, or Little Vieux Fort River, is a tributary of the main river. Together the two rivers form the Vieux Fort River basin, which covers just over 7,000 acres.

== See also ==
- List of rivers of Saint Lucia
- Vieux Fort, Saint Lucia
