= Anse Cochon River =

River in Saint Lucia

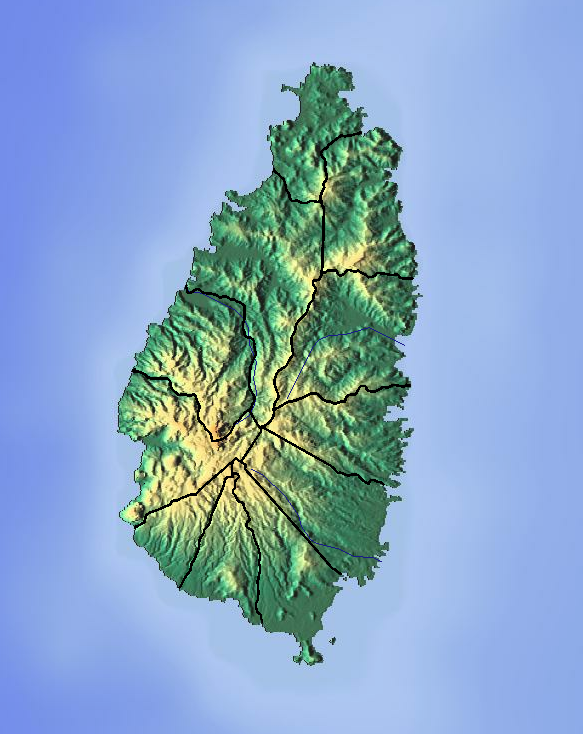
- Location of mouth in Saint Lucia

Location
- Country: Saint Lucia
- Region: Canaries Quarter

Physical characteristics
- Mouth
  - coordinates: 13°55′N 61°03′W

The Anse Cochon River is a river in Saint Lucia.

== See also ==
- List of rivers of Saint Lucia
