= Canaries River =

River in Saint Lucia

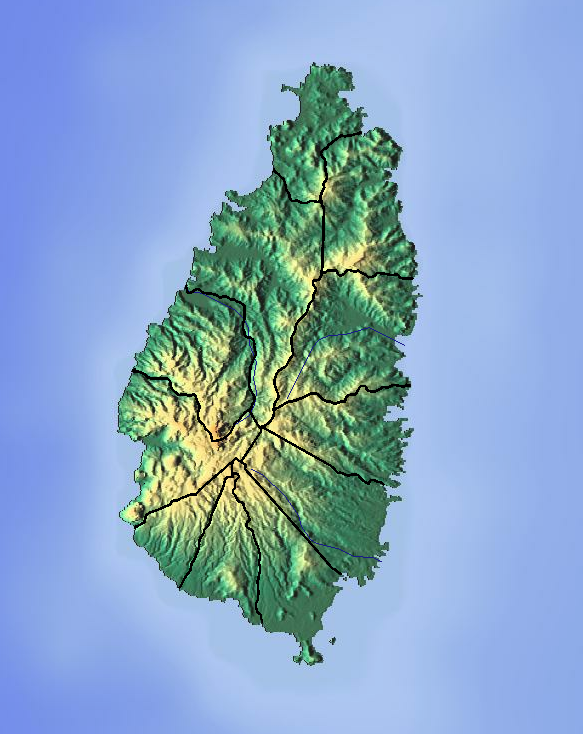
- Location of mouth

Location
- Country: Saint Lucia
- Region: Canaries Quarter

The Canaries River is a river on the island of Saint Lucia.

== See also ==
- List of rivers of Saint Lucia
