= Canelles River =

River of Saint Lucia

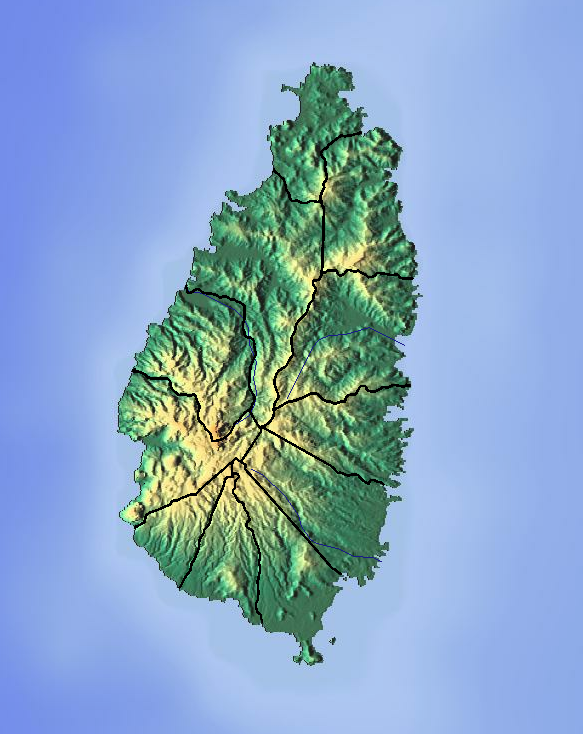
- Location of mouth

Location
- Country: Saint Lucia
- Region: Micoud Quarter

Physical characteristics
- Mouth: Atlantic Ocean
  - coordinates: 13°46′N 60°54′W

The Canelles River is a river in Saint Lucia. It flows southeast from the central highlands in the south of the island, reaching the Atlantic Ocean to the south of the town of Micoud.

== See also ==
- List of rivers of Saint Lucia
