= Cul de Sac River =

River in Saint Lucia

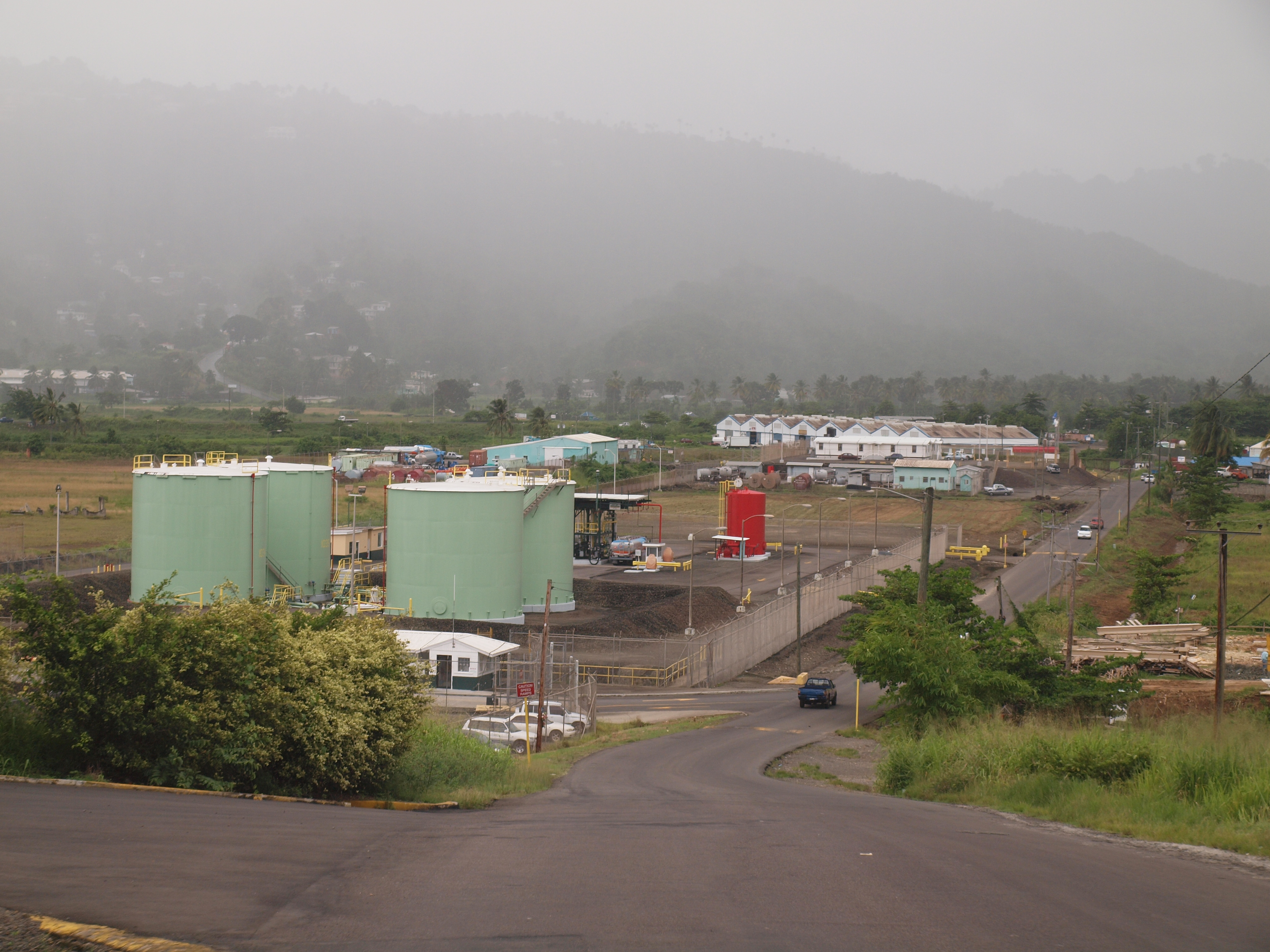
- Cul de Sac Valley and the Hess Oil Terminal

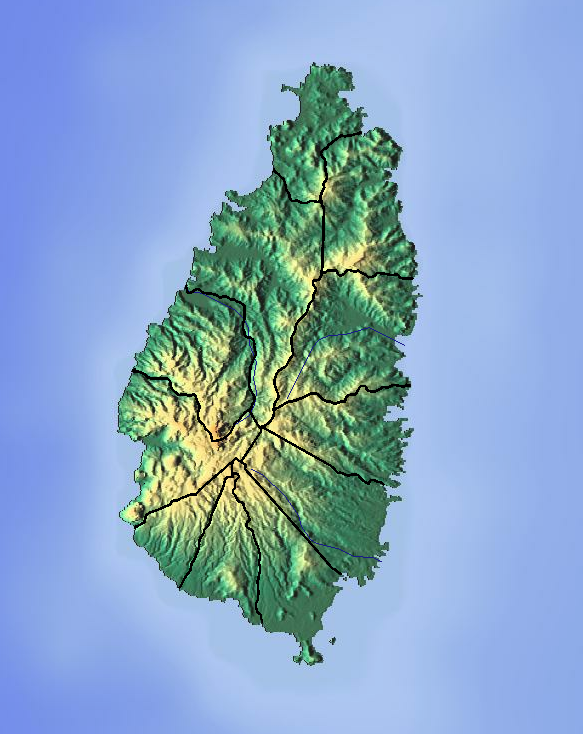
- Location of mouth

Location
- Country: Saint Lucia
- Region: Castries Quarter

Physical characteristics
- Mouth: Grand Cul de Sac Bay
  - location: Castries
  - coordinates: 13°59′02″N 61°00′40″W

The Cul De Sac River is a river in Castries Quarter of the island country of Saint Lucia. It flows north and then west from the central highlands in the south of the island, reaching the Caribbean Sea in Grand Cul de Sac Bay, south of the capital, Castries. It is one of the longest rivers in Saint Lucia.

== See also ==
- List of rivers of Saint Lucia
