= Trou Grauval River =

River of Saint Lucia

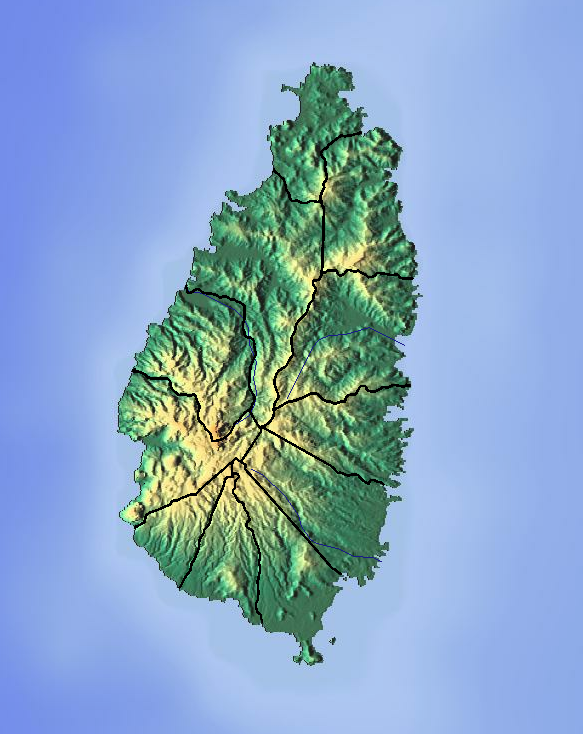
- Location of mouth

Location
- Country: Saint Lucia
- Region: Gros Islet Quarter

Physical characteristics
- Mouth: Atlantic Ocean
  - coordinates: 14°03′N 60°53′W

The Trou Grauval River is a river of Saint Lucia.

== See also ==
- List of rivers of Saint Lucia
