= Praslin River =

River of Saint Lucia

Praslin River Rivière des Trois Islets
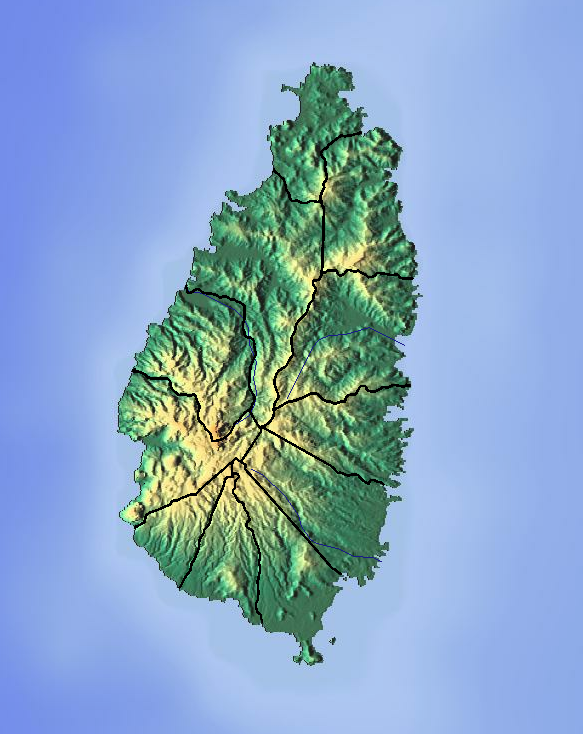
- Location of mouth

Location
- Country: Saint Lucia
- Region: Micoud Quarter

Physical characteristics
- Mouth: Atlantic Ocean
  - coordinates: 13°52′N 60°53′W

The Praslin River is a river of Saint Lucia.

== See also ==
- List of rivers of Saint Lucia
