= L'Ivrogne River =

River in Saint Lucia

L’Ivrogne River
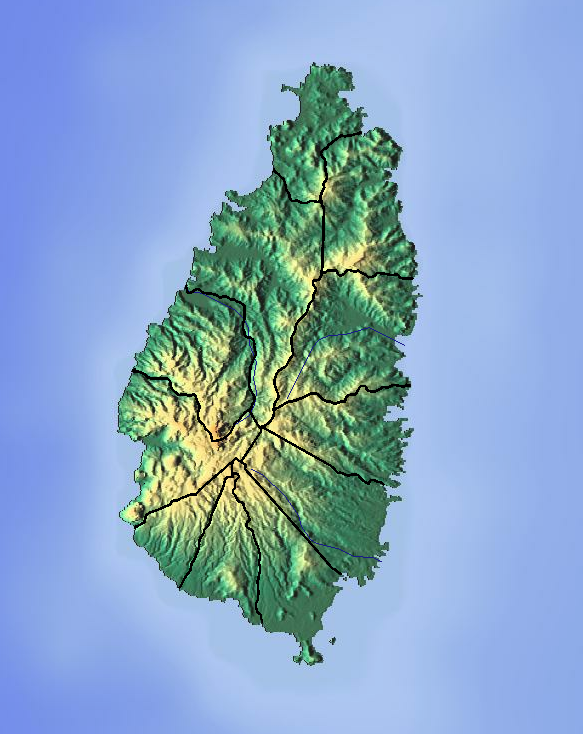
- Location of mouth

Location
- Country: Saint Lucia
- Region: Soufrière Quarter

Physical characteristics
- Mouth: L'Ivrongne Bay (Anse), Caribbean Sea
  - coordinates: 13°47′57″N 61°04′03″W

The L’Ivrogne River is a river in the Soufrière Quarter of the island nation of Saint Lucia. It flows into the L'Ivrogne Bay, Caribbean Sea.

== See also ==
- List of rivers of Saint Lucia
