= Choc Bay =

Waterbody in Saint Lucia

- Anse du Choc
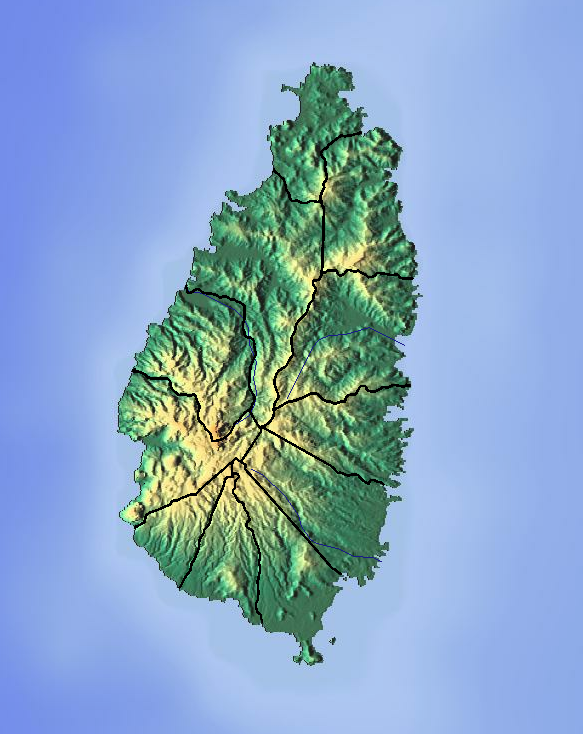
- Location of bay
- Location: Gros Islet Quarter, Saint Lucia
- Coordinates: 14°02′26″N 60°58′28″W
- Part of: Caribbean Sea

Choc Bay is a bay in Gros Islet Quarter on the island nation of Saint Lucia; it is along the northwestern coast of the island. The Choc River flows into the bay.

== History ==
Francis Willoughby, 5th Baron Willoughby of Parham's expedition built a fort overlooking the bay in 1664, but it was abandoned in 1666. The French then built a fort here in 1667.

== See also ==
- List of rivers of Saint Lucia
