= Ger River =

River of Saint Lucia

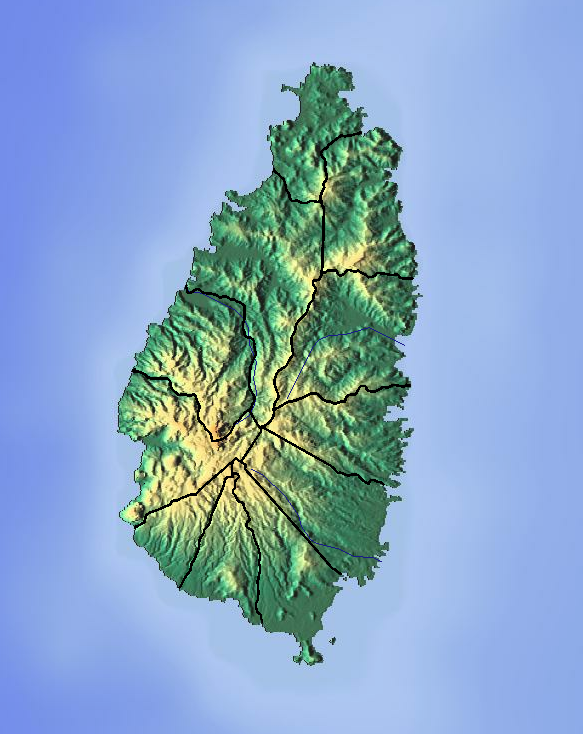
- Location of mouth

Location
- Country: Saint Lucia
- Region: Micoud Quarter

Physical characteristics
- Mouth: Atlantic Ocean
  - coordinates: 13°47′N 60°54′W

The Ger River is a river of Saint Lucia.

== See also ==
- List of rivers of Saint Lucia
