= Piaye River =

River of Saint Lucia

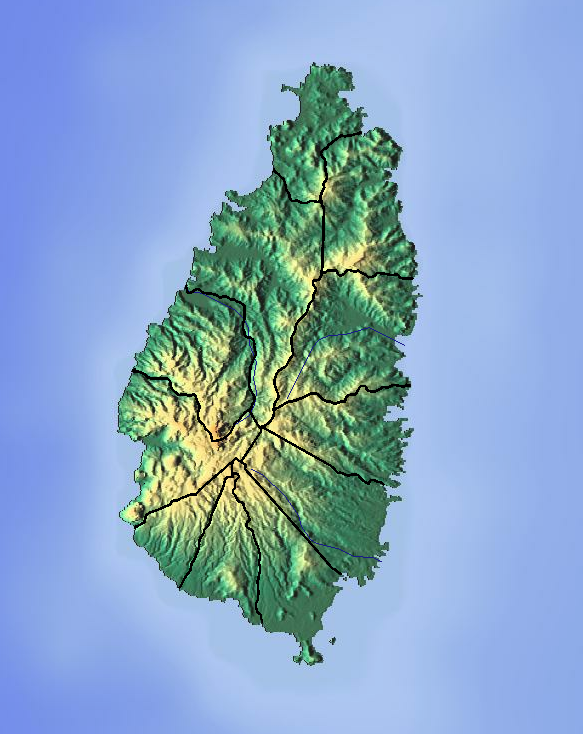
- Location of mouth

Location
- Country: Saint Lucia
- Region: Laborie Quarter

Physical characteristics
- Mouth: Caribbean Sea
  - coordinates: 13.752907°N 61.019287°W

The Piaye River is a river in Laborie Quarter of the island nation of Saint Lucia.

== See also ==
- List of rivers of Saint Lucia
