= Castries River =

River in Saint Lucia

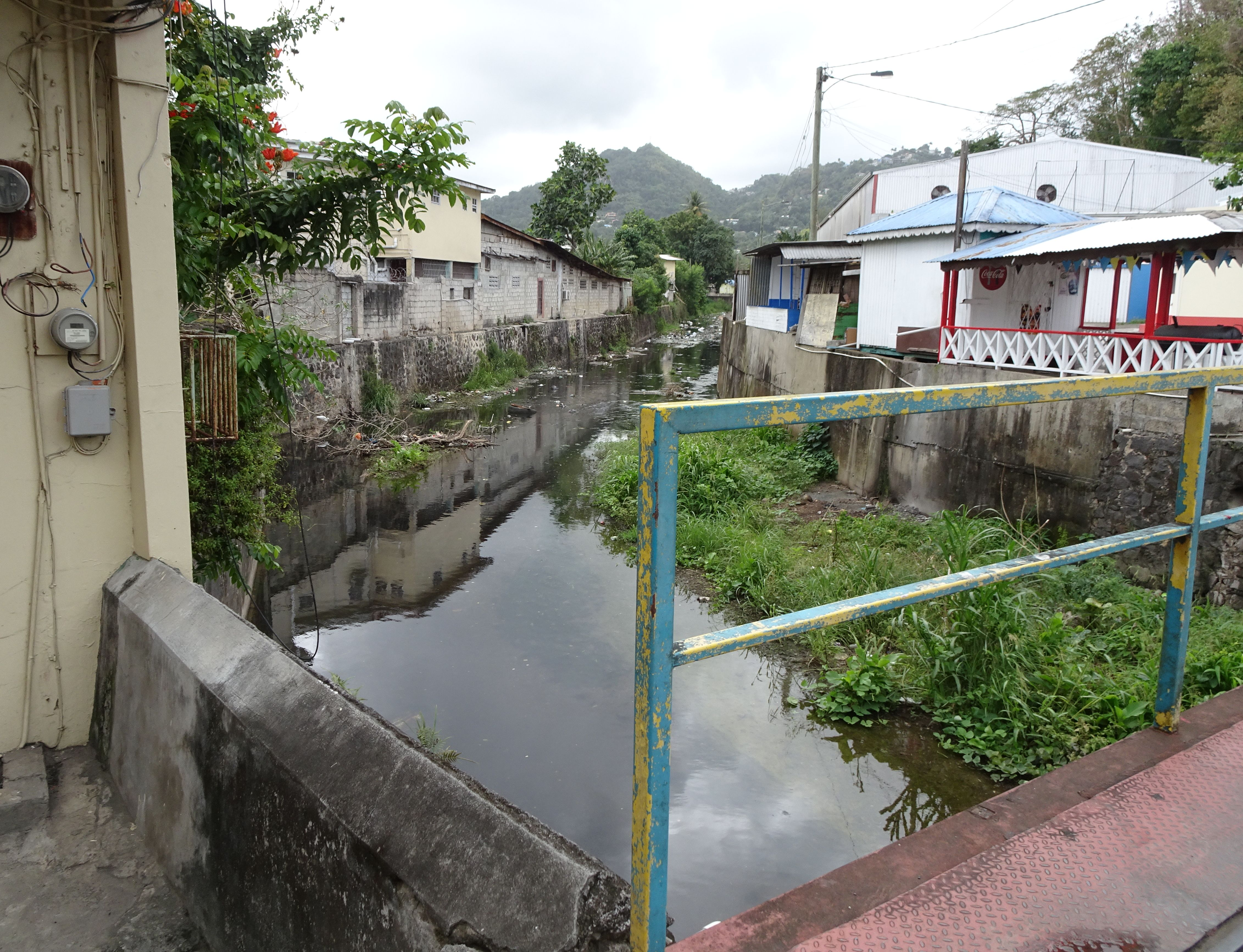

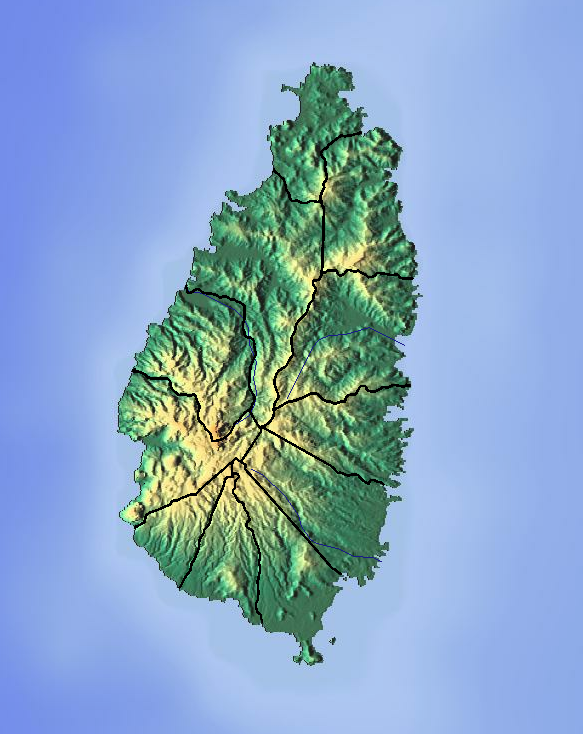
- Location of mouth

Location
- Country: Saint Lucia
- Region: Castries Quarter

Physical characteristics
- Mouth: Caribbean Sea
  - location: Castries, Saint Lucia
  - coordinates: 14°01′N 60°59′W

The Castries River is a river in Castries Quarter on the island country of Saint Lucia.

== See also ==
- List of rivers of Saint Lucia
