= Troumassée River =

River of Saint Lucia

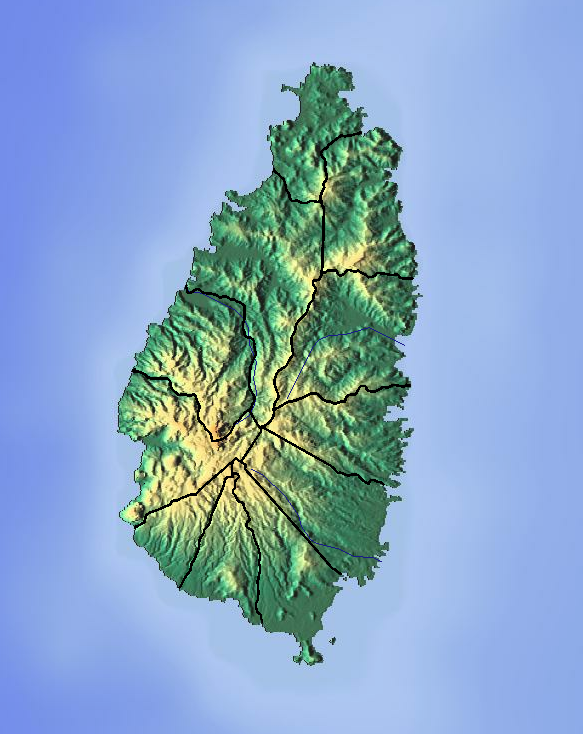
- Location of mouth

Location
- Country: Saint Lucia
- Region: Micoud Quarter

Physical characteristics
- Mouth: Atlantic Ocean
  - location: Micoud, Saint Lucia
  - coordinates: 13.812815°N 60.897106°W

The Troumassée River is a river in Saint Lucia. It rises in the centre of the island, flowing southeast to its mouth close to the town of Micoud on the southeast coast.

== See also ==
- List of rivers of Saint Lucia
