= Rouarne River =

River of Saint Lucia

Rouarné River
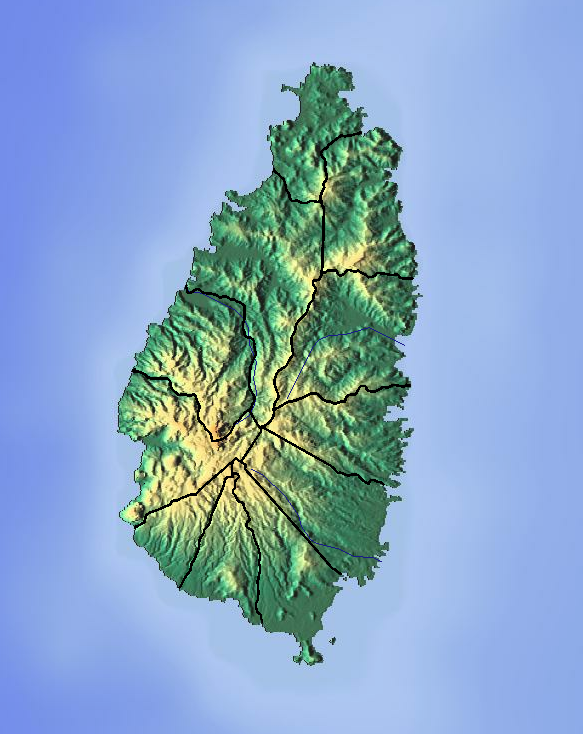
- Location of mouth

Location
- Country: Saint Lucia
- Region: Micoud Quarter

Physical characteristics
- Mouth: Atlantic Ocean
  - coordinates: 13°45′59″N 60°55′06″W

The Rouarné River is a river in the Micoud Quarter of the island nation of Saint Lucia. It is on the windward side of the island and flows into the Atlantic Ocean.

== See also ==
- List of rivers of Saint Lucia
