= Ramiro Choc =

Guatemalan Mayan peasant leader

Ramiro Choc is a Guatemalan Mayan (Q'eqchi') peasant leader. He was born in extreme poverty in a plantation within the municipality of El Estor, Izabal Department. Died: 23 May 2022. His parents had been born slaves. At age 17 he became a catechist for the Catholic Church where he taught a liberation theology in which people should not only have justice after death in heaven but also during life on earth. This brought him great support among the peasant population but not among all of the church hierarchy.

After nearly thirteen years as a catechist, the gap between Choc's liberation theology and the conservative doctrine of many of his superiors became too large. Choc was hired by the National Indigenous and Peasant Coordinating Committee (CONIC) as a "promoter", working primarily with indigenous communities involved in land struggles.

With CONIC, Choc earned a reputation for his firm defense of the rights of indigenous communities. After approximately seven years, he left CONIC and helped form a new organization, Encuentro Campesino (Peasant Encounter/Gathering).

Choc continued helping indigenous Q'eqchi' communities reclaim their rights, especially through Encuentro Campesino. Choc didn't only work with Q'eqchi' communities but also with Ladino (of Spanish or mixed descent) and Garifuna (of African descent) peasants.

On February 14, 2008, Choc was illegally abducted by the military and threatened with assassination. Due to local and international outcry and mobilization, his life was spared and he was instead charged with land invasion, robbery, and holding people against their will. He was convicted despite a complete lack of evidence against him. On 21 February, supporters of Choc took 19 policemen hostage, demanding his release. After more than 24 hours the hostages were released unharmed. On 14 March, the same group took four Belgian tourists and their two Guatemalan guides hostage, again demanding Choc's release. The Belgians were released on 16 March. Despite the fact that Choc was eligible for release in 2011, he continued to be held in prison until his release in October 2013.
