= CHOC-FM =

- Saint-Raymond de Portneuf, Quebec; Canada
- Frequency: 88.7 MHz

Programming
- Language: French
- Format: Classic hits

Ownership
- Owner: 11733630 Canada inc (CHOC FM)

History
- First air date: September 25, 2020

Technical information
- Licensing authority: CRTC
- Class: B1
- ERP: 7,164 watts (average); 12,000 watts (peak)
- HAAT: 138.4 metres (454 ft)
- Transmitter coordinates: 46°49′41.16″N 71°51′19.08″W

Links
- Website: choc887.com

CHOC-FM is a French-language radio station that broadcasts at 88.7 FM in Saint-Raymond de Portneuf, Quebec, Canada.

== History ==
In 2018, an independent local group led by Michel Lambert filed an application for a new French-language commercial radio station to serve the Portneuf Regional County Municipality. The CRTC approved the broadcasting licence on October 25, 2019, under the corporate entity 11733630 Canada Inc. At launch, the ownership and founding group consisted of business partners Michel Lambert, François Brunet, Gilles Lapointe, and Communications Zone Media, a media firm owned by cousins Michel and Tony Cloutier.

Operating from its main studios in Pont-Rouge, CHOC-FM officially went on the air on September 25, 2020, broadcasting on 88.7 MHz from its transmitter located in Saint-Raymond. The station originally proposed a 100% local adult contemporary music format featuring pop-rock hits from 1965 to the present day, alongside regional public affairs and weekend country music programming.

In November 2021, Communications Zone Media bought out all the other shareholders to become the sole owner of the station. The CRTC officially approved this transfer of control on November 12, 2021, under administrative decision L2021-42 (via 3924301 Canada Inc.). Following this full takeover by the Cloutier cousins, the station adjusted its musical identity, shifting toward a curated blend of classic rock and classic pop hits.

On May 10, 2022, the CRTC denied an application by 11733630 Canada Inc. to operate a new FM transmitter at 103.7 MHz in Saint-Augustin-de-Desmaures, Quebec.

On September 22, 2023, the CRTC approved an application by 11733630 Canada Inc. to add a new FM transmitter at Neuville, Quebec on the frequency of 99.5 MHz (channel 258A1) with a maximum effective radiated power (ERP) of 140 watts, an average ERP of 87 watts, a directional antenna, and an effective height of the antenna above average terrain (EHAAT) of 82.4 metres. The new transmitter, CHOC-FM-1 at 99.5 MHz in Neuville, would rebroadcast the programming of CHOC-FM 88.7 Saint-Raymond de Portneuf.

On February 14, 2026, the station fell victim to a cyberattack that resulted in the loss of all its digital data. CHOC FM could not pay the ransom demanded by the hackers and had to rebuild its entire IT infrastructure from scratch.

== Notes ==
The CHOC callsign was used at a former radio station in Saint-Rémi, Quebec from 1998 until 2018.
