= St. Lucia Electricity Services =

Electric utility company in Saint Lucia

St. Lucia Electricity Services Limited
- Trade name: LUCELEC
- Industry: electric power
- Founded: 1964
- Headquarters: Castries, Saint Lucia
- Revenue: EC$134,189,000 (2002)
- Website: www.lucelec.com

The St. Lucia Electricity Services Limited (LUCELEC) is an electric utility company of Saint Lucia.

== History ==
The company was established in 1964. The company went public on 11 August 1994.

== Finance ==
In 2022, the company revenue reached EC$134,189,000.

== Power stations ==
- Cul De Sac Power Station
