= La Verdure River =

River in Saint Lucia

Anse la Verdure River
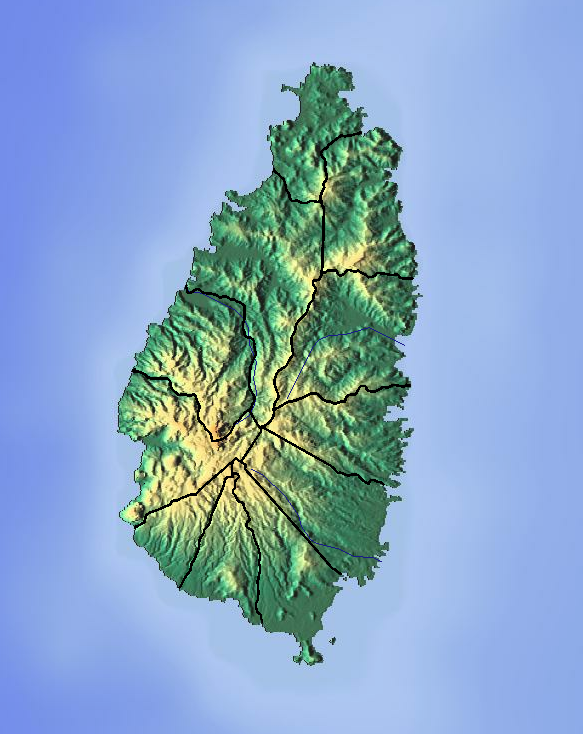
- Location of mouth

Location
- Country: Saint Lucia
- Region: Canaries Quarter

Physical characteristics
- Mouth: Caribbean Sea
  - coordinates: 13°55′12″N 61°03′35″W

The La Verdure River is a river of Saint Lucia.

== See also ==
- List of rivers of Saint Lucia
