= Dorée River =

River of Saint Lucia

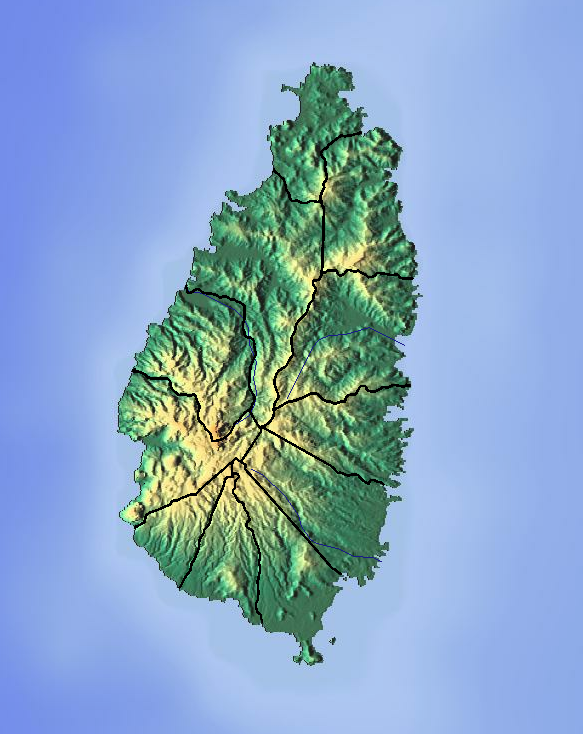
- Location of mouth

Location
- Country: Saint Lucia
- Region: Choiseul Quarter

Physical characteristics
- Mouth: Caribbean Sea
  - coordinates: 13°45′33″N 61°02′15″W

The Dorée River is a river on the island of Saint Lucia.

== See also ==
- List of rivers of Saint Lucia
