= Choc (magazine) =

French photography magazine

Choc ('Shock') was a fortnightly French language magazine based in France.

== History and profile ==
Choc was launched on 17 June 2004. The magazine, published fortnightly, was part of Hachette Filipacchi Media, a subsidiary of Lagardère Group. It was geared towards publishing shocking photographs. It also covers celebrity photographs.

A US edition of the magazine, Shock, was published by Hachette Filipacchi Media U.S. between May and December 2006.

SCPE, the company that owned the magazine, went into receivership on September 15, 2009 and was liquidated in 2012.
