= CHOC-FM (Saint-Rémi, Quebec) =

Coordinates: 45°15′28″N 73°37′26″W

- Saint-Rémi, Quebec; Canada
- Frequency: 104.9 MHz

Programming
- Language: French
- Format: Community radio

Ownership
- Owner: Radio communautaire intergénération Jardin du Québec

History
- First air date: 1998
- Last air date: August 6, 2018

Technical information
- Licensing authority: CRTC
- ERP: 547 watts; 1,750 watts (maximum)
- HAAT: 62.9 metres (206 ft)

CHOC-FM was a French language community radio station that operated at 104.9 FM in Saint-Rémi, Quebec, Canada.

== History ==
Owned by Radio communautaire intergénération Jardin du Québec, the station received CRTC approval in 1998.

On October 26, 2011, Radio Communautaire Intergeneration Jardin applied to increase the power of CHOC 104.9 in Saint-Remi, QC from 250 to 547 watts (1,750 watts maximum ERP), raise antenna height from 30 to 62.9 metres (EHAAT) and relocate the transmitter site. Also on October 26, 2011, applications were also submitted for the following proposed CHOC rebroadcasters:

- Napierville, QC - 103.5 - 1,188 watts (3,800 watts maximum ERP)
- Saint-Jacques-le-Mineur, QC - 102.9 - 117 watts (250 watts maximum ERP)

These proposed technical changes and addition of new FM transmitters, dated October 26, 2011, received CRTC approval on January 12, 2012.

In December 2018, the CRTC announced it would not renew the CHOC-FM licence at the end of the year for noncompliance with annual filing requirements and failure to join the National Public Alerting System. CHOC-FM had been out of compliance in two consecutive licence terms. The point was moot, as the station closed on August 6, days before filing a bankruptcy petition in the Superior Court of Quebec.

The call letters have since been assigned to a new French-language station that will be operated on 88.7 FM at Saint-Raymond de Portneuf, which went on the air in September 2020. (See: CHOC-FM)
