= La Tourney =

Town in Vieux Fort District, Saint Lucia

- Location in Saint Lucia
- Coordinates: 13°44′29″N 060°57′30″W
- Country: Saint Lucia
- District: Vieux Fort District

La Tourney is a town in Vieux Fort District in the island country of Saint Lucia. La Tourney is in the La Tourney/Cedar Heights section of Vieux Fort District, which has a population of 706. La Tourney is located on the southern coast of Saint Lucia, close to Hewanorra International Airport (13°43′59″N 60°57′09″W). There is also a 127 m (417 ft) high Tourney Mountain nearby at 13°44′34″N 60°57′55″W.

== See also ==
- List of cities in Saint Lucia
- Vieux Fort District
