= Choc River =

River in Saint Lucia

Choc Union River, Shock River
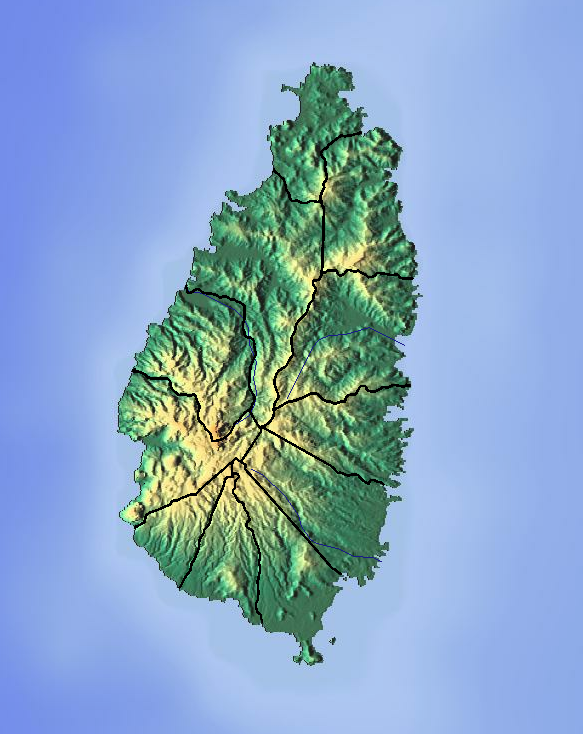
- Location of mouth

Location
- Country: Saint Lucia

Physical characteristics
- Source
  - coordinates: 14.03015°N 60.96386°W
- Mouth: Choc Bay
  - coordinates: 14.03868°N 60.97257°W

The Choc River is a river on the border between the Castries and Gros Islet Districts of the island country of Saint Lucia. It flows to the Caribbean Sea.

== See also ==
- List of rivers of Saint Lucia
