= Vieux Fort District =

District of Saint Lucia

Vieux Fort
- District
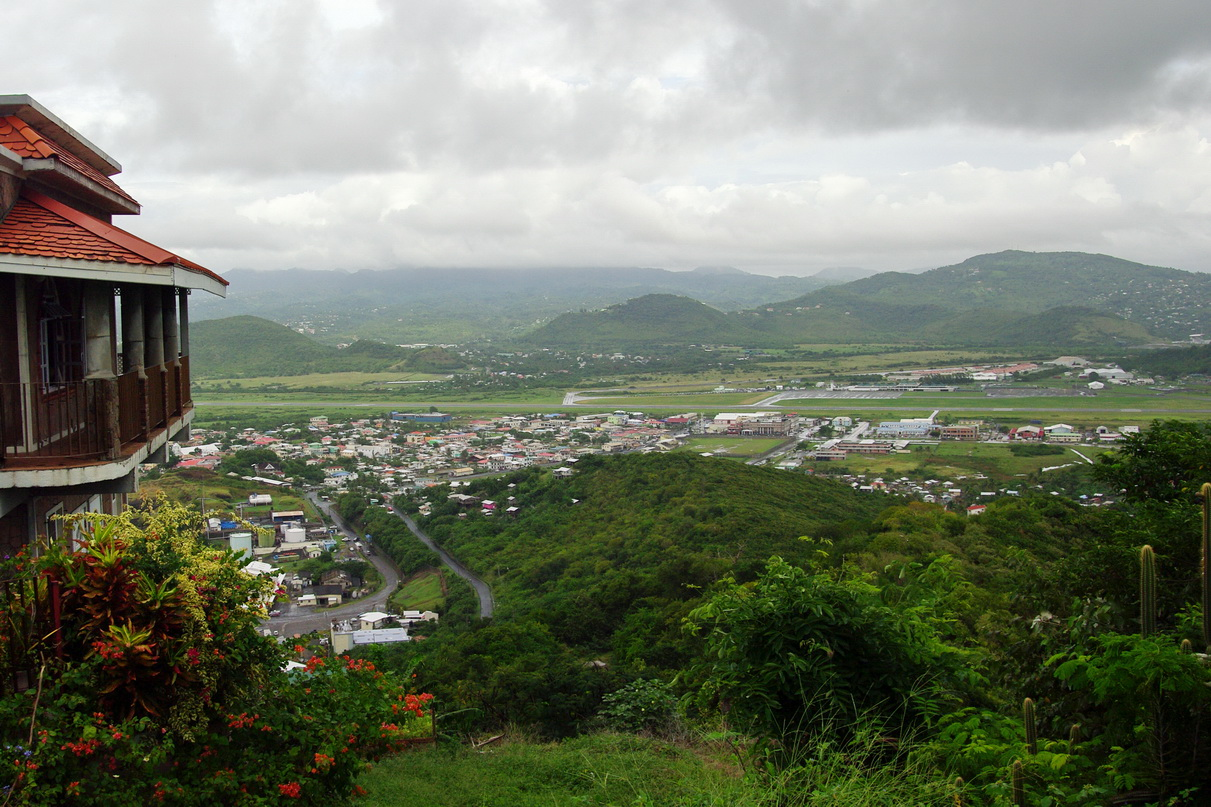
- Vieux Fort, Saint Lucia

- Location of Vieux Fort District within Saint Lucia
- Coordinates: 13°45′N 60°57′W
- Country: Saint Lucia

Area
  - Total: 49.8 km^{2} (19.22 sq mi)

Population (2010)
  - Total: 14,754
  - Density: 296/km^{2} (770/sq mi)
- ISO 3166-2:LC: LC-11

Vieux Fort is one of 10 districts of the Caribbean island country of Saint Lucia. Vieux Fort is also the name of the main town in the district. It is the home of the second-largest town in Saint Lucia and is the home of Saint Lucia's international airport, Hewanorra International Airport (Hewanorra is the island's old Amerindian name).

== Geography ==
It has several small communities which include Augier, Pierrot, Belle Vue, Black Bay, Grace, La Resource, Pierrot, St. Urban, La Tourney, Vige, and Zaboo.

== Economy ==
Every Friday and Saturday is market day where you can buy local goods such as spices, ground provisions and fruits. It also houses St. Lucia's biggest fish market, and you can go to the mall every day which sells fashion products.

== History ==
Dutch sailors built a fort here, though the first fort in St. Lucia was built by the Oliphe Blossome settlers in 1605.

In the second half of the 18th century, Vieux Fort was the center of Saint Lucia's sugar industry; today it is more industrial.

Part of Vieux Fort is called Black Bay. It got its name because legend has it that the infamous pirate Blackbeard used this part of the country to stash his ill-gotten gains.

During the Second World War, Vieux Fort became a base for American troops. Some of the evidence can still be seen around town, such as the tunnel that runs from Clark Street all the way to St. Judes Hospital in Augier. This tunnel was used for storage of supplies and also a quick route to the hospital. Many people who reside in Vieux-Fort today have no idea about such a tunnel.

In recent years a new modern part of Vieux Fort has been erected to reflect the modern world, yet the old town is well-preserved along Clark Street and its surrounding roads. Historic colonial houses that give Vieux Fort a touch of Old England and France can be seen (albeit needing renovation). In recent times Black Bay has become a haven for expatriates.

== Government ==
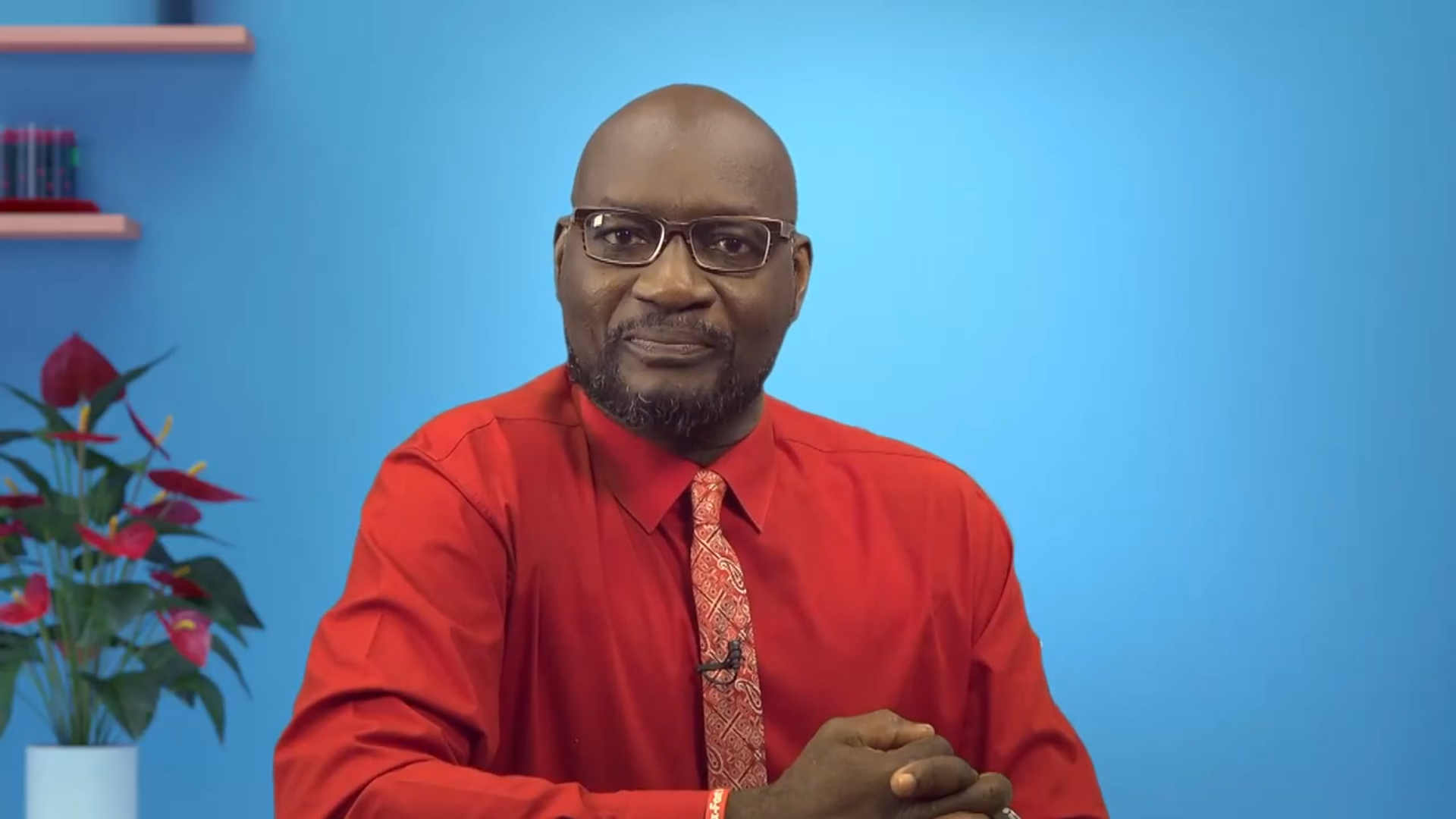
Current Representative for Vieux Fort North – Moses Jean Baptiste

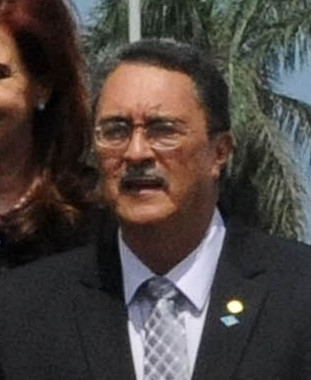
Current Representative for Vieux Fort South – Kenny Anthony

The Vieux Fort district is divided into two electoral constituencies represented in the House of Assembly. The electoral constituencies has been represented since July 2021 by Moses Jean Baptiste (Vieux Fort North) and Kenny Anthony (Vieux Fort South) as Parliamentary Representatives. The district elected their representatives during the countries recent general election.

== Tourism ==
Whilst the majority of tourist activity in Saint Lucia is based on the west coast, some hotels are located in Vieux Fort District. A notable tourist attraction is the Maria Islands Nature Reserve, managed by the Saint Lucia National Trust, which is a nesting ground for leatherback turtles and is home to a species of iguana indigenous to St. Lucia.

== See also ==
- Vieux Fort River
  - Little Vieux Fort River

== Citations ==
- "Vieux Fort Great Southern Hospitality". Saint Lucia.
