= List of rivers of Saint Lucia =

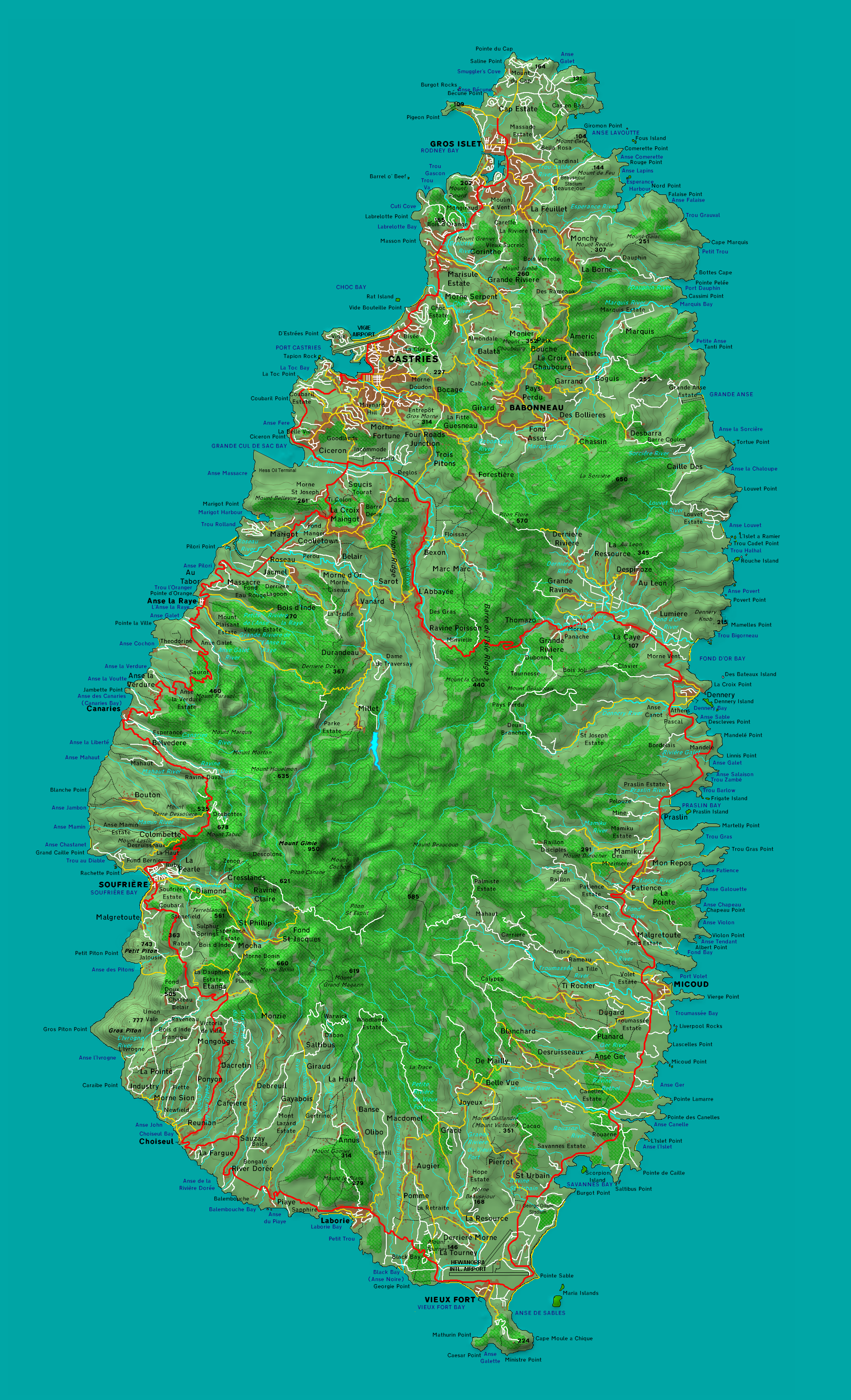
Map of Saint Lucia, with topographic relief.

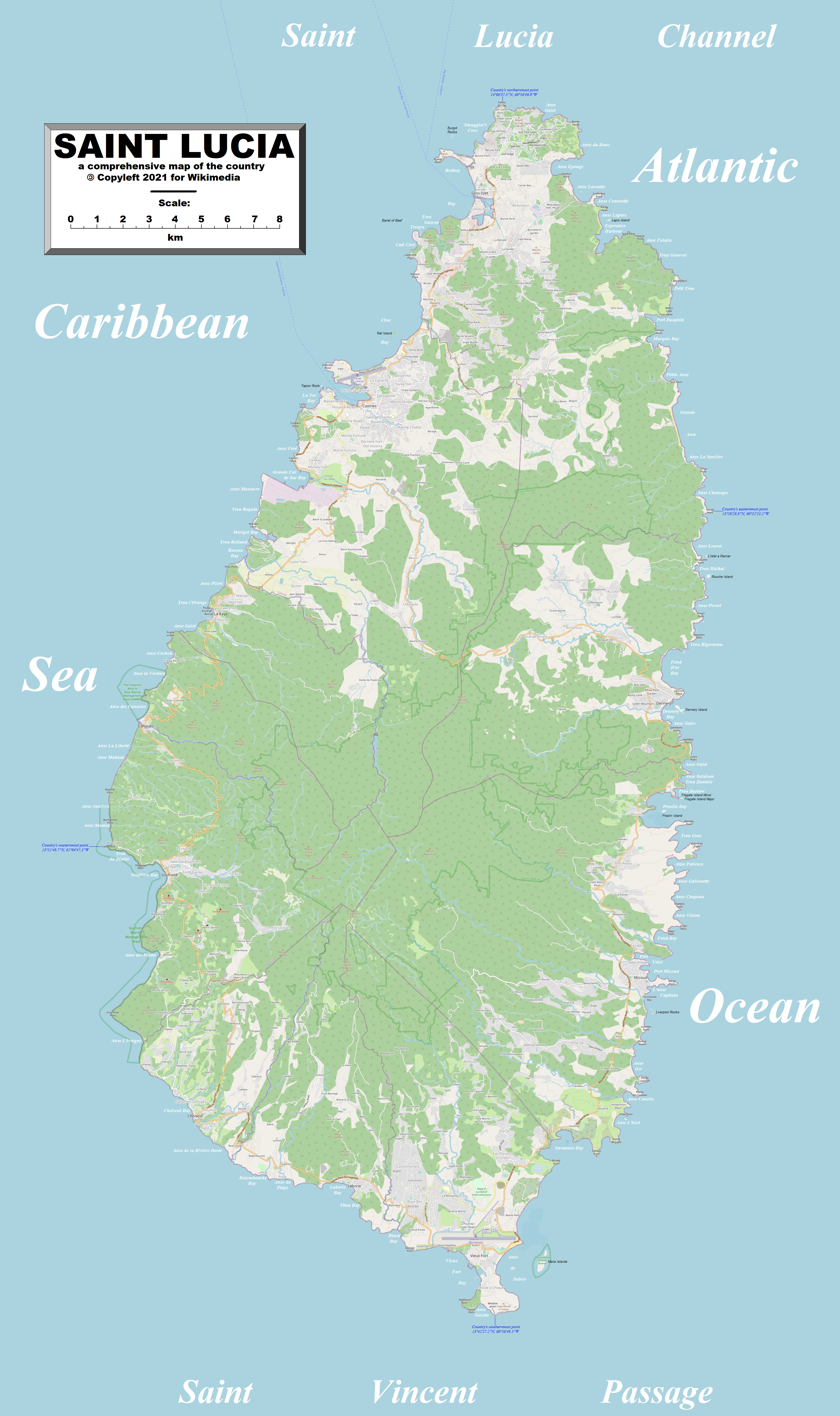
Map of Saint Lucia (flat).

This is a list of rivers in the island country of Saint Lucia. Rivers are listed in clockwise order, starting at the north end of the island.

== Rivers ==
There are 180 streams in Saint Lucia. Most of the rivers empty into the Atlantic Ocean or Caribbean Sea at the coast of Saint Lucia. (The location of the river mouths indicated in this list. Only Roseau and Migny rivers are not on the coast.) The longest river is the Roseau River with a drainage area of 48 km^{2} (19 sq mi). There are 28 drainage basins for rivers of Saint Lucia.

Rivers in Saint Lucia
Order	Name	Location of mouth
1	Trou Sallé River	14°04′46″N 60°55′12″W
2	Esperance River	14°03′37″N 60°54′45″W
3	Dauphin River	14°02′24″N 60°53′46″W
4	Trou Grauval River	14°03′29″N 60°53′30″W
5	Marquis River	14°01′52″N 60°53′44″W
6	Louvet River	13°57′53″N 60°52′48″W
7	Fond d'Or River	13°55′23″N 60°53′25″W
8	Dennery River	13°54′30″N 60°53′26″W
9	Praslin River (Rivière des Trois Islets)	13°52′44″N 60°53′45″W
10	Mamiku River	13°52′18″N 60°53′49″W
11	Patience River	13°51′28″N 60°53′19″W
12	Fond River	13°49′56″N 60°53′36″W
13	Volet River	13°49′38″N 60°54′01″W
14	Troumassée River	13°48′46″N 60°53′50″W
15	Ger River	13°47′49″N 60°54′02″W
16	Canelles River	13°46′50″N 60°54′14″W
17	Rouarne River	13°45′59″N 60°55′06″W
18	Vieux Fort River	13°43′50″N 60°58′07″W
18a	Little Vieux Fort River	
19	Black Bay River	13°44′11″N 60°58′51″W
20	Piaye River	13°45′10″N 61°01′09″W
21	Balembouche River	13°45′15″N 61°01′32″W
22	Dorée River	13°45′33″N 61°02′15″W
23	Trou Barbet River	13°46′42″N 61°03′08″W
24	Grande Rivière Choiseul	13°46′21″N 61°03′02″W
25	L’Ivrogne River	13°47′57″N 61°04′03″W
26	Soufrière River	13°51′21″N 61°03′38″W
26a	Jeremy River	
26b	Migny River	13°51′13″N 61°02′11″W
27	Mamin River	13°52′15″N 61°04′43″W
28	Mahaut River	13°53′32″N 61°04′25″W
29	Canaries River	13°54′18″N 61°04′08″W
30	La Verdure River	13°55′12″N 61°03′35″W
31	Anse Cochon River	13°55′36″N 61°03′24″W
32	Grande Rivière de l'Anse la Raye	13°56′21″N 61°02′39″W
33	Petite Riviere de l'Anse La Raye	13°56′31″N 61°02′37″W
34	Roseau River	13°57′36″N 61°01′57″W
34a	Millet River	13°55′29″N 60°59′22″W
35	Cul de Sac River	13°59′02″N 61°00′40″W
36	Castries River	14°00′34″N 60°59′38″W
37	Choc River	14°02′19″N 60°58′18″W
38	Bois d'Orange River	14°03′56″N 60°57′59″W

== See also ==
- Geography of Saint Lucia
- Quarters of Saint Lucia
- List of cities in Saint Lucia

== Notes ==
Breen's list of major rivers in Saint Lucia in 1844 includes a Vide Bouteille River but there is no mention of this river in the current GeoNames database. There is a Vide Bouteille Point on the coast at 14°01′52″N 60°58′45″W.
