= Laborie District =

Laborie
- District
- Location of Laborie District within Saint Lucia
- Coordinates (Town of Laborie): 13°46′N 61°00′W
- Country: St. Lucia

Area
  - Total: 33.9 km^{2} (13.1 sq mi)

Population (2022)
  - Total: 8,507
  - Density: 251/km^{2} (650/sq mi)
- ISO 3166-2:LC: LC-07
- Website: www.ilovelaborie.com

Laborie District is a district of Saint Lucia. According to the 2022 census, it had a population of 8,507 inhabitants. The village of Laborie serves as its seat. The district is known for its sugar industry and associated plantations.

== History ==
Laborie was formerly known as Rade et Anse de l'Ilet à Caret, meaning "Turtle Island Anchorage and Beach" and was renamed in honour of the Baron de Laborie, Governor of Saint Lucia from 1784 to 1789. The earlier inhabitants of the area were Amerindians, ascertained from the archeological findings and petroglyphs located outside of the village of Laborie. The region was a major center for the sugar industry during the colonial occupation, with several plantations and estates in the region.

== Geography and administration ==
Laborie District covers an area of 33.9 km^{2} (13.1 sq mi) and forms part of the Southern Quadrant of St. Lucia. The administrative seat is the village of Laborie, located about 27 km (17 mi) south of Castries, the nation's capital. It lies on the southern coast of St. Lucia and is prone to natural disasters such as tsunamis triggered due to volcanic and seismic activity in the vicinity.

The Laborie District is an electoral constituency electing its representative to the House of Assembly of Saint Lucia.

== Demographics ==
Laborie District recorded a population of 8,507 as per the 2022 census. The population which was 6,701 as per the 2010 census, had earlier decreased from 7,978 in 2001 census. The population consisted of 4,248 males and 4,259 females. About 83.7% of the population were born in the district, with 14.2% from other districts in St. Lucia, and 2.1% outside the country. Roman Catholics (64.1%) formed the majority with other Christian denominations forming minorities in the district. Apart from agriculture, fishing is a key economic sector, as it is located along the coast.
