= Hurricane Dean =

Category 5 Atlantic hurricane in 2007

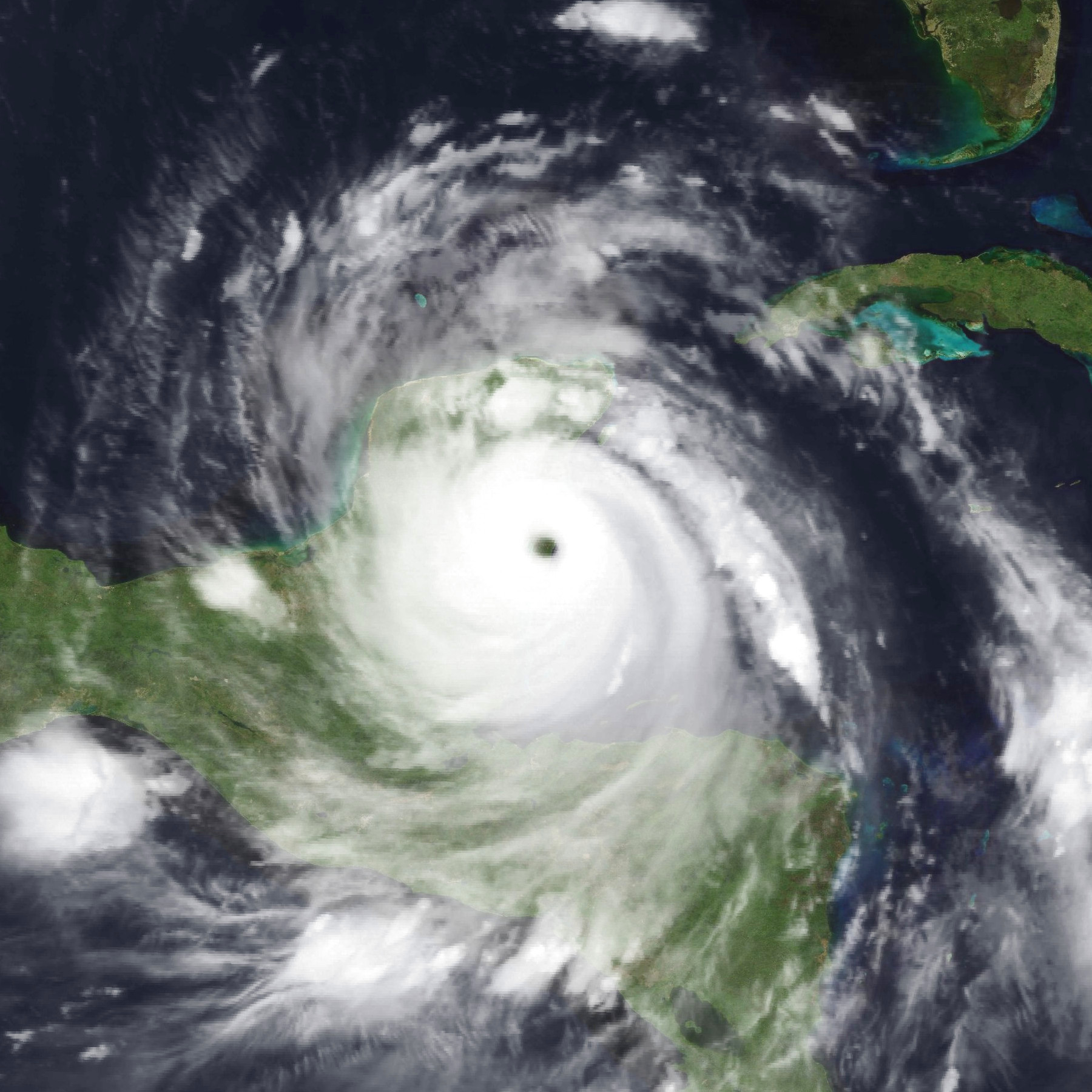
- Hurricane Dean at peak intensity while making landfall in Mexico on August 21

Meteorological history
- Formed: August 13, 2007
- Remnant low: August 23, 2007
- Dissipated: August 27, 2007

Category 5 major hurricane
- 1-minute sustained (SSHWS/NWS)
- Highest winds: 175 mph (280 km/h)
- Lowest pressure: 905 mbar (hPa); 26.72 inHg

Overall effects
- Fatalities: 45 (40 direct, 5 indirect)
- Damage: $1.66 billion (2007 USD)
- Areas affected: Lesser Antilles, Greater Antilles, Nicaragua, Honduras, Belize, Guatemala, Mexico, Gulf Coast of the United States, Southwestern United States
- IBTrACS
- Part of the 2007 Atlantic hurricane season

Hurricane Dean was the most powerful and destructive tropical cyclone of the 2007 Atlantic hurricane season. It ties with Hurricane Mitch for the tenth most intense Atlantic hurricane by atmospheric pressure. Additionally, it made the fifth most intense landfall in the basin by central pressure. A Cape Verde hurricane that formed on August 13, 2007, Dean took a west-northwest path from the eastern Atlantic Ocean through the Saint Lucia Channel and into the Caribbean Sea. It strengthened into a major hurricane, (Note: A major hurricane is a hurricane that ranks as Category 3 or higher on the Saffir–Simpson scale.) reaching Category 5 status on the Saffir–Simpson scale before passing just south of Jamaica on August 20. The storm made landfall on the Yucatán Peninsula on August 21 at peak intensity. It crossed the peninsula and emerged into the Bay of Campeche weakened, but still remained a hurricane. It strengthened briefly before making a second landfall near Tecolutla in the Mexican state of Veracruz on August 22. Dean drifted to the northwest, weakening into a remnant low which dissipated uneventfully over the southwestern United States. Dean was the second-most intense tropical cyclone worldwide of 2007 in terms of pressure, only behind Cyclone George in the Australian region, and tied with Felix as the most intense worldwide in terms of 1-minute sustained winds.

The hurricane's intense winds, waves, rains and storm surge were responsible for at least 45 deaths across ten countries and caused estimated damages of US$1.66 billion. First impacting the islands of the Lesser Antilles, Dean's path through the Caribbean devastated agricultural crops, particularly those of Martinique and Jamaica. Upon reaching Mexico, Hurricane Dean was a Category 5 storm, but it missed major population centers and its exceptional Category 5 strength landfall caused no deaths and less damage than in the Caribbean islands it passed as a Category 2 storm.

Through the affected regions, clean up and repair took months to complete. Donations solicited by international aid organizations joined national funds in clearing roads, rebuilding houses, and replanting destroyed crops. In Jamaica, banana production did not return to pre-storm levels for over a year. Mexico's tourist industry took almost a year to rebuild its damaged cruise ship infrastructure.

Dean was the first hurricane to make landfall in the Atlantic basin at Category 5 intensity since Hurricane Andrew on August 24, 1992. The hurricane's long swath of damage resulted in its name retirement from the World Meteorological Organization's Atlantic hurricane naming lists.

== Meteorological history ==
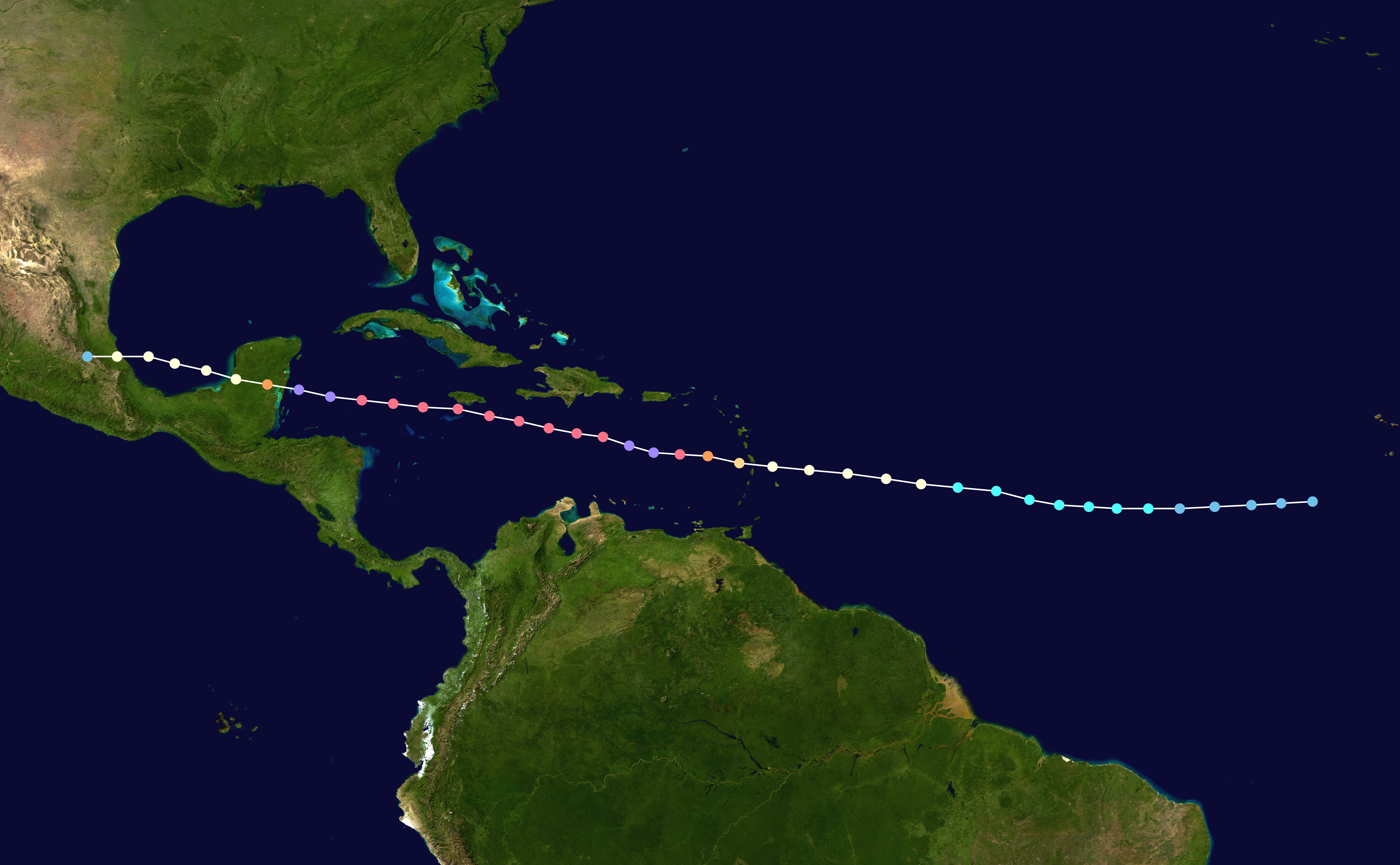
Map plotting the storm's track and intensity, according to the Saffir–Simpson scale Map key Saffir–Simpson scale Tropical depression (≤38 mph, ≤62 km/h) Tropical storm (39–73 mph, 63–118 km/h) Category 1 (74–95 mph, 119–153 km/h) Category 2 (96–110 mph, 154–177 km/h) Category 3 (111–129 mph, 178–208 km/h) Category 4 (130–156 mph, 209–251 km/h) Category 5 (≥157 mph, ≥252 km/h) Unknown Storm type Tropical cyclone Subtropical cyclone Extratropical cyclone, remnant low, tropical disturbance, or monsoon depression

On August 11, 2007, a vigorous tropical wave moved off the west coast of Africa, producing disorganized showers and thunderstorms. It encountered conditions favorable for gradual development, and on August 12 it gained organization and became a low. Strong upper-level easterly winds slowed development, but on August 13 the tropical wave gained enough organization that the National Hurricane Center designated it Tropical Depression Four. At this time it was centered about 520 mi (835 km) west-southwest of Cape Verde. The depression was already exhibiting persistent deep convection in the western portion of its circulation. It moved quickly westward, south of a deep layered ridge, escaping the easterly wind shear that had been slowing its development and moving over warmer waters. At 1500 UTC on August 14, the depression was upgraded to Tropical Storm Dean while still 1450 mi (2300 km) east of Barbados. Even as its convection waned slightly that afternoon, its intensity grew, and convection flared in the center that night. Dry air and cooler air inflow from the north slowed structural development; nevertheless, ragged bands began to form on August 15. By mid-morning, a rough banding eye had formed, and by the next morning a full eye developed. The storm was upgraded to Hurricane Dean at 0900 UTC August 16, 550 mi (890 km) east of Barbados.

A strong ridge of high pressure continued to push the system west, towards the Caribbean Sea. That afternoon, convective banding and increasing upper-level outflow strengthened the storm to a Category 2 hurricane on the Saffir–Simpson scale. The eye disappeared briefly overnight, possibly as part of a diurnal fluctuation, but returned by the morning of August 17. At 0930 UTC on August 17, the center of Hurricane Dean passed into the Caribbean Sea through the Saint Lucia Channel between the islands of Martinique and St. Lucia. The northern eyewall passed over Martinique where a weather station in the island's capital of Fort-de-France reported 13 in (33 cm) of rainfall. By this time the eyewall had closed, forming a distinct eye, and in an environment of low wind shear and increasing ocean temperature the hurricane began to intensify rapidly. Hurricane Dean strengthened to a Category 3 hurricane by the evening of August 17. Satellite imagery showed that a well defined eye and numerous cyclonically curved convective bands remained over the Lesser Antilles. That evening, another reconnaissance aircraft reached the hurricane and discovered that it had strengthened into a Category 4 hurricane, and by 0600 UTC on August 18, Dean reached Category 5 intensity for the first time with 165 mph (270 km/h) winds. The storm's wind radii increased in all quadrants as the storm grew in both intensity and size. At 0800 UTC August 18, Hurricane Dean passed directly over NOAA sea buoy 42059 which reported a significant wave height (average size of the largest 33% of waves) of 33 ft (10 m). On August 18, Hurricane Dean developed a double eyewall, indicating that an eyewall replacement cycle was taking place and causing short term fluctuations in intensity as Dean weakened back to a Category 4 hurricane. That afternoon the hurricane continued to improve its outflow, and its numerous spiral bands gave it a well defined satellite presentation. Hurricane Dean finished the eyewall replacement cycle early on August 19 with some trochoidal wobbles.

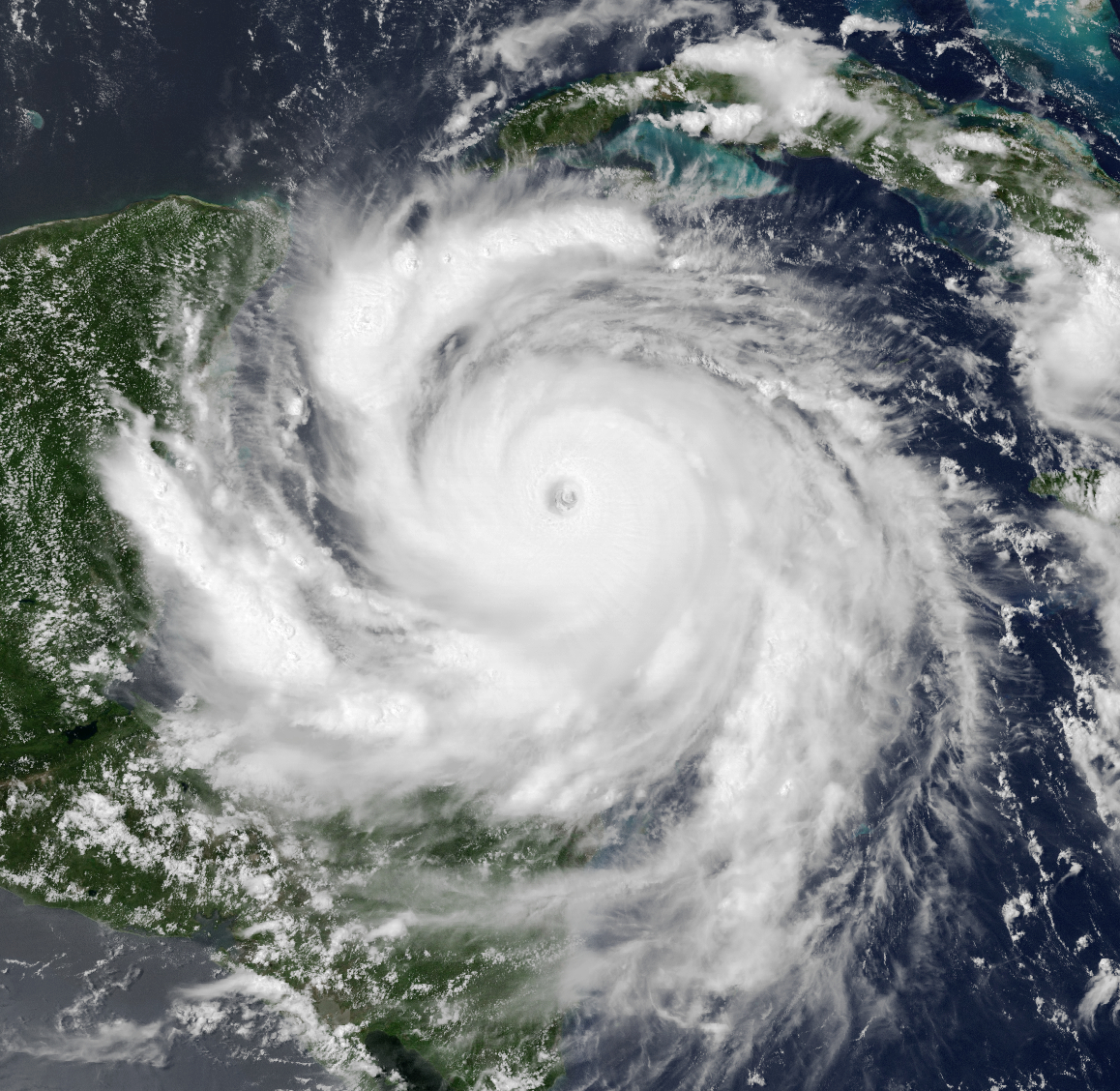
Hurricane Dean approaching Mexico on August 20

On the morning of August 19, the storm remained slightly weakened from its peak strength. As a Category 4 hurricane with wind speeds between 140 mph (220 km/h) and 145 mph (230 km/h), the center of Hurricane Dean passed 90 mi (150 km) south of Haiti, and that evening passed 25 mi (40 km) south of Jamaica. Two weather stations on the island of Jamaica, one at Ingleside and the other at Morant Bay, both reported in excess of 13 in (33 cm) of rainfall. In contrast, the weather station at Les Cayes, Haiti recorded only 1.18 in (3 cm) of rainfall. Hurricane Dean intensified through the night of August 19 and reinforced its completed eyewall replacement cycle by forming a tight single-walled eye. At 0100 UTC August 20, the storm passed 120 mi (190 km) to the south of Sea Buoy 42056, which recorded a significant wave height of 36 ft (11 m). A concentric eyewall was briefly observed again on the morning of August 20, but it did not last long. In conditions of low wind shear, Hurricane Dean moved westward over waters with increasingly high heat content, and the storm exhibited a classic upper-tropospheric outflow pattern. The high pressure system over the southeastern United States continued to steer the storm west towards the Yucatán Peninsula. The eyewall became even better defined throughout the day. The cloud tops cooled, the minimum central pressure fell, and its winds increased to 160 mph (260 km/h), making Hurricane Dean a Category 5 hurricane once again. This time, it was less than 210 mi (335 km) from its first landfall.

Most intense Atlantic hurricanes
| Rank | Hurricane | Season | Pressure | |
| Rank | Hurricane | Season | hPa | inHg |
|---|---|---|---|---|
| 1 | Wilma | 2005 | 882 | 26.05 |
| 2 | Gilbert | 1988 | 888 | 26.23 |
| 3 | "Labor Day" | 1935 | 892 | 26.34 |
| 3 | Melissa | 2025 | 892 | 26.34 |
| 5 | Rita | 2005 | 895 | 26.43 |
| 5 | Milton | 2024 | 895 | 26.43 |
| 7 | Allen | 1980 | 899 | 26.55 |
| 8 | Camille | 1969 | 900 | 26.58 |
| 9 | Katrina | 2005 | 902 | 26.64 |
| 10 | Mitch | 1998 | 905 | 26.73 |
| 10 | Dean | 2007 | 905 | 26.73 |
Source: HURDAT

Although many of the convective bands were already located over the Yucatán Peninsula, Hurricane Dean continued to intensify until the eye made landfall. As the eye moved over Mexico near the town of Majahual in the Costa Maya area, the NHC estimated surface level winds of 175 mph (280 km/h), making Dean the first storm to make landfall as a Category 5 hurricane in the Atlantic basin since Hurricane Andrew in 1992. At the same time, a dropsonde reading from the hurricane's eye estimated a central pressure of 905 mbar, making Dean the fifth most intense landfalling Atlantic storm in history (after the Labor Day Hurricane of 1935, Hurricane Camille of 1969, Hurricane Gilbert of 1988, and Hurricane Melissa of 2025) and tying Dean with Mitch as the tenth most intense hurricane ever recorded in the Atlantic basin. The landfall itself occurred in a sparsely populated area of the Costa Maya region of the Mexican state of Quintana Roo near 18.7 N 87.8 W at 0900 UTC August 21 and brought with it a storm surge of 12–18 ft (3.7–5.5 m). A weather station at Chetumal (the capital of Quintana Roo, Mexico) reported 6.65 in (17 cm) of rainfall during Hurricane Dean's landfall. As expected, the landfall caused significant weakening of the storm; the eye filled and the cold cloud-tops warmed. The land severely disrupted the storm's organization, and by the time Dean crossed the Yucatán Peninsula it had weakened to a Category 1 hurricane. Hurricane Dean emerged into the Bay of Campeche as a Category 1 hurricane on the afternoon of August 21. Its inner core was largely disrupted, so although a ragged eye reformed over the warm waters of the bay, the hurricane no longer had the structure to support its previous strength. Nevertheless, the warm waters of the bay proved conducive for some development and the eye contracted overnight, indicating that the hurricane was regaining structure. With better structure came stronger winds of 100 mph (160 km/h), and the storm was re-categorized as a Category 2 hurricane.

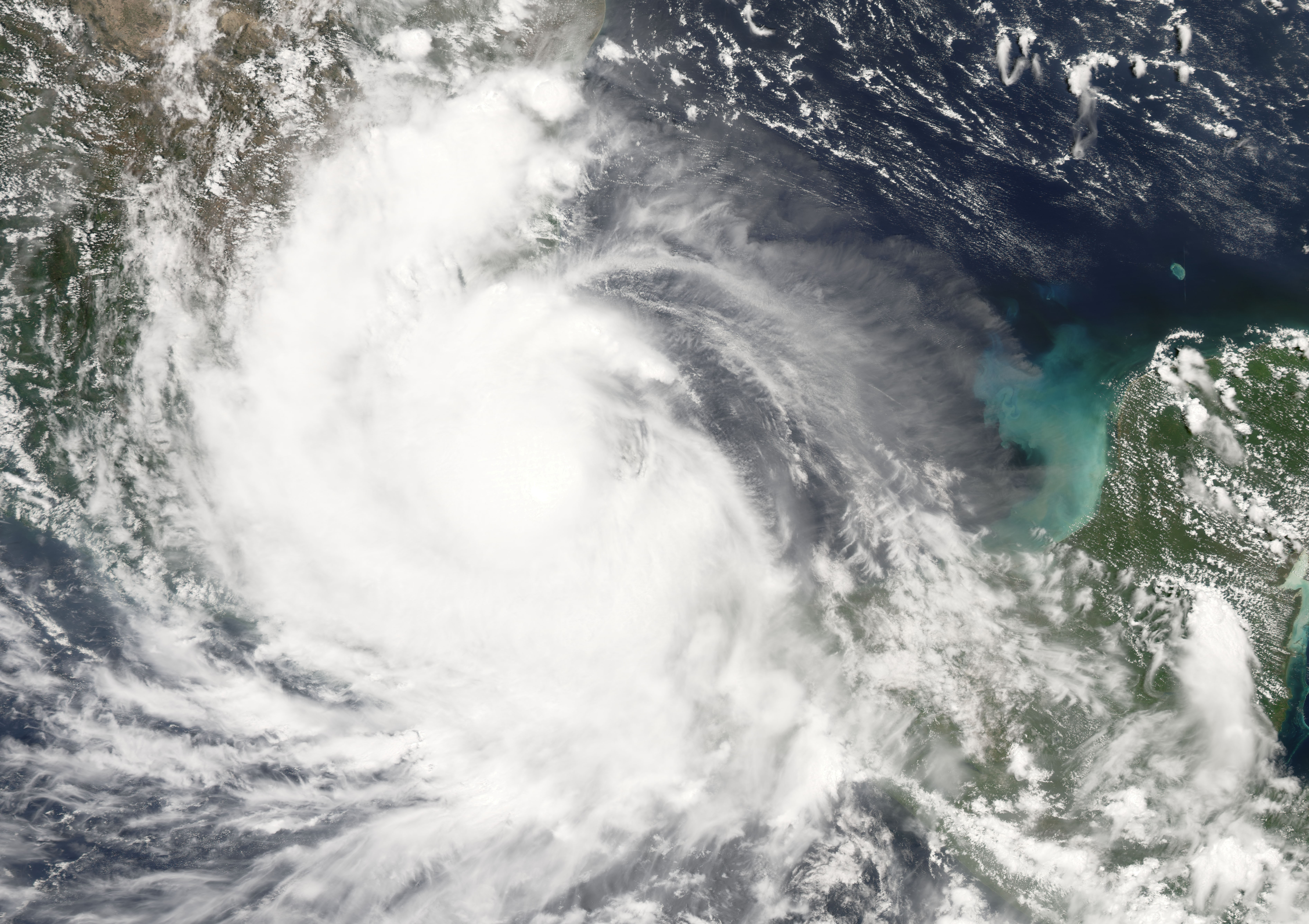
Hurricane Dean making landfall in Veracruz on August 22

The storm's strengthening pattern continued until Hurricane Dean made its second and final landfall at 1630 UTC August 22 near Tecolutla, Veracruz, just east of Gutiérrez Zamora and about 40 mi (65 km) south-southeast of Tuxpan. A weather station at Requetemu, San Luis Potosí, recorded 15.4 in (39 cm) of rainfall during the storm's second landfall. Dean weakened rapidly, losing its low level circulation within hours and its mid-level circulation the next day as it encountered the Sierra Madre Oriental mountain range. Its remnants passed over the mountains and into the eastern Pacific Ocean as a broad area of low pressure. Hurricane Dean's remnant low pressure system then drifted north into southern California, bringing thunderstorms to northern San Diego County, and more than 2 in (5 cm) of rain to Lake Wohlford. In Escondido almost 2 in (5 cm) of rain fell in 90 minutes. The remnant low pressure system weakened over western Arizona and southern California before finally dissipating on August 30.

== Preparations ==
Hurricane Dean's smooth and well-predicted track gave unusually advance warning to all of the nations in its path and allowed them time to prepare for the storm's impact. In anticipation of Dean's impact, the nations of Central America and the Caribbean opened shelters, readied emergency personnel, and evacuated residents from vulnerable areas.

=== Lesser Antilles ===
The National Hurricane Center consistently predicted that the storm would intensify and pass through the islands. As Hurricane Dean approached, the island nations began to prepare with a flurry of activity. On August 14 the Caribbean Disaster Emergency Response Agency (CDERA) placed its Regional Response Mechanism on standby and contacted the National Disaster Coordinators of all member states in the Lesser Antilles. On August 15 the U.S. Agency for International Development (USAID) dispatched teams to Barbados, Dominica, and St. Kitts in advance of the hurricane to provide damage assessment should the hurricane affect those islands. At 11 p.m. AST August 15 (0300 UTC August 16) the respective governments of St. Lucia, Martinique, Saba, St. Eustatius, and Guadeloupe and its dependencies issued Hurricane watches and the government of the Netherlands Antilles issued a tropical storm watch for the island of St. Maarten, as then-Tropical Storm Dean was expected to intensify to hurricane strength and reach the Windward Islands within 36 hours. Authorities in Martinique canceled a memorial to the victims of West Caribbean Airways Flight 708 and began to set up shelters.

At 5 a.m. AST (0900 UTC) August 16 the respective governments of St. Lucia and Dominica issued hurricane warnings in anticipation of Hurricane Dean's imminent approach. In Dominica, a dozen and a half tourists were evacuated to concrete shelters. The government of Dominica also canceled leave for emergency service personnel and evacuated Princess Margret Hospital, fearing that its roof might be vulnerable to the storm's winds. At the same time the Meteorological Service of Barbados issued a tropical storm warning for Barbados and a tropical storm watch for St. Vincent. Three hours later, at 8 a.m. AST (1200 UTC), the Meteorological Service of Antigua issued a tropical storm watch for Montserrat, Antigua, St. Kitts, Nevis and Barbuda. Shortly thereafter the Trinidad and Tobago Meteorological Service issued a tropical storm watch for Grenada and its dependencies.

The Eastern Caribbean Donor Group convened a meeting on August 16 under the Chair of the Resident Representative United Nations Development Programme Barbados in anticipation of the hurricane causing significant damage and member states requiring international assistance. At 11 a.m. AST (1500 UTC) the Barbados Meteorological Service issued tropical storm warnings for St. Vincent and the Grenadines, and the Government of the Netherlands Antilles discontinued the hurricane watch on Saba and St. Eustatius, replacing it with a tropical storm warning. At 5 p.m. AST (2100 UTC) August 16, roughly 15 hours before Hurricane Dean arrived, the Government of France issued hurricane warnings for Martinique and Guadeloupe and its dependencies, and the NHC issued a tropical storm watch for the U.S. Virgin Islands and Puerto Rico. At 8 p.m. AST (2100 UTC) August 16 the Meteorological Service of Antigua issued a tropical storm warning for Anguilla. Martinique's main airport and both of St. Lucia's commercial airports closed that night when the last airplanes landed as the storm's outer rainbands began to sweep over the island. At 11 p.m. AST August 16 (0300 UTC August 17) the NHC upgraded the tropical storm watch on U.S. Virgin Islands to a tropical storm warning. The next morning, August 17, the center of Hurricane Dean passed between St. Lucia and Martinique. The Meteorological Service of Antigua issued a tropical storm warning for the British Virgin Islands that same morning, and the Eastern Caribbean Donor Group convened a second meeting to finalize the coordination of three Rapid Assessment Teams.

=== Greater Antilles ===
A tropical storm watch was issued for the south coast of the Dominican Republic on August 17 at 0300 UTC. Later that day the tropical storm watch was upgraded to a tropical storm warning. Additionally, a hurricane watch was issued from Cabo Beata to the Haitian border. This was further upgraded that night with a hurricane warning from Barahona to the Haitian border. Workers from World Vision, already on the island for unrelated humanitarian work, pre-positioned food, clean water, medicines and emergency generators in the southern provinces where hurricane warnings had been issued. As the storm approached, 1,580 of the island's most vulnerable residents were evacuated to shelters. A tropical storm watch was issued at 0900 UTC for the southwestern peninsula of Haiti from Port-au-Prince to the Dominican border. This advisory was upgraded the next morning to a tropical storm warning and a hurricane watch, and that night was further upgraded to a hurricane warning. The Haitian coastal authority advised all small craft to stay in port, while at Port-au-Prince, all flights to southern Haiti from Toussaint Louverture International Airport were canceled. More than 1,000 people were evacuated from low-lying areas and workers from World Vision again pre-positioned relief supplies.

On August 17, when a hurricane watch was issued for Jamaica, Prime Minister of Jamaica Portia Simpson-Miller convened an emergency meeting of Jamaica's national disaster preparedness council. Political parties in the island suspended their campaigning for the August 27 national elections to allow residents to prepare for the storm. The Caribbean Disaster Emergency Response Agency (CDERA), which was already responding to Hurricane Dean's impact in the Lesser Antilles, contacted the Jamaican Office of Disaster Preparedness and Emergency Management to confirm technical and logistics support, and to notify the Jamaican government that utilities teams had been placed on standby should they be needed. The North-West Caribbean Donor Group also met to consider what action might it might undertake in Dean's aftermath. On August 18 the hurricane watch was upgraded to a hurricane warning. Curfews were put in place for parts of the island, while off-duty essential personnel were called back to work. The United States confirmed that it would offer aid if it was needed. Only one member of a United Nations Disaster Assessment and Coordination team arrived in Jamaica before all incoming flights were canceled. More than 1,000 schools and churches were converted to emergency shelters, but residents only occupied 47 of them before the storm's arrival. The country's high crime rate led islanders to fear for their belongings should they abandon their homes. UNICEF prepared 4 emergency health kits and 1,000 water containers and Copa Airlines agreed to fly the supplies to Jamaica on its scheduled August 22 flight, if possible. The World Food Programme prepared food stock in nearby Haiti, ready to move them to Jamaica if they were needed, although damage to their airport ultimately prevented their distribution.

At 21:00 UTC August 16, 2007 a tropical storm watch was issued for Puerto Rico. At 0300 UTC August 17 this advisory was upgraded to a tropical storm warning. The U.S. Federal Emergency Management Agency, eager to make a good showing after its heavily criticized response to Hurricane Katrina, deployed a Federal Incident Response Support Team to the unincorporated territory of the United States ahead of Hurricane Dean. This five-member team of disaster management experts was equipped with satellite communication systems to provide video-teleconferencing and help make real-time assessments of any damage. On August 17 a tropical storm watch was issued for Cuba between the provinces of Camagüey and Guantánamo. This was upgraded on the afternoon of August 18 to a tropical storm warning. At 0300 UTC August 19 a tropical storm watch was issued for portions of central Cuba: Ciego de Ávila, Sancti Spíritus, Cienfuegos, Matanzas, and Isla de la Juventud. More than 350,000 people were evacuated by the Civil Defense in the coastal provinces, and the government in Havana suspended all tourist programs ahead of the storm.

=== Mexico ===
Forecasters and computer models at the Miami-based National Hurricane Center predicted that Hurricane Dean would impact the Yucatán Peninsula a full 6 days before the storm actually arrived. The hurricane's stable and well predicted path gave all of the countries in the region ample time to prepare for its arrival. On August 17, at the request of the Quintana Roo state government, which was expecting their state to suffer a direct hit, the Civil Protection Office of Mexico's federal Interior Ministry declared a state of emergency for the entire state. This included the towns and cities of Cancún, Playa del Carmen, and Chetumal as well as the islands of Cozumel, Isla Mujeres and Holbox.

On August 18 authorities began evacuating people from parts of Quintana Roo, moving 2,500 people from Holbox Island and a further 80,000 tourists from elsewhere in the state. Air-evacuations of tourists were stopped when Dean's outer rainbands closed almost a dozen Cancún and Cozumel airports on the evening of August 20. The Campeche airport closed shortly thereafter. The state government set up 530 storm shelters in schools and other public buildings, prepared to hold 73,000 people. With 20,000 food packages ready, the state of Yucatán, Quintana Roo's neighbor to the northwest, declared a green alert indicating a low but significant level of danger. World Vision and other international aid agencies prepared blankets, sheets, personal hygiene items and medicines for quick transport to affected areas. The United States pre-positioned a three-person disaster management team into the Yucatán before the storm's arrival with the intent of helping coordinate disaster management if necessary. The U.S. State Department urged its citizens in Quintana Roo, Yucatán, and Campeche to prepare for the storm and to evacuate if necessary. The department also relocated its non-essential personnel from those states to Mexico City. At 1500 UTC on August 19 a hurricane watch was issued on the Yucatán Peninsula from Chetumal to San Felipe and final preparations were rushed to completion.

On August 20, warnings for Dean's second landfall were issued. The coast from Progreso to Ciudad del Carmen was put under a hurricane warning and the coast from Cancún at the tip of the Yucatán Peninsula west to Progreso. At 0300 UCT, August 21, a tropical storm watch was issued for the coast from Chilitepec to Veracruz, and a hurricane watch was issued from Chilitepec to Tampico, Tamaulipas. As Dean began to cross the Yucatán Peninsula and maintained its structure better than forecasters had expected, these watches and warnings were expanded. At their peak, a hurricane warning covered the area from Campeche, Campeche, to Coatzacoalcos, Veracruz, and a tropical storm warning stretched from Tampico to La Cruz, Tamaulipas. Residents in Veracruz stocked up on essential supplies, especially food and water, ahead of the storm's second landfall. At the request of the government of Veracruz, federal Secretary of the Interior Francisco Ramírez Acuña declared a state of emergency for 81 municipalities ahead of Hurricane Dean's expected landfall in the state. This gave local authorities access to the resources of the Revolving Fund of the National Natural Disaster Fund to take care of the nutrition, health, and shelter their populations should the storm's damage require it. Although Dean was still a hurricane and was expected to re-strengthen slightly before making its second landfall, the fact that it had weakened caused some residents to let down their guard. As a result, residents of Veracruz and Campeche were much less prepared for the storm than those on the Yucatán Peninsula.

=== Belize ===
A hurricane warning was issued for the coastal locations north of Belize City with the forecast of 150 mph (240 km/h) winds. The government instituted a dusk-to-dawn curfew from Belize City to the Mexican border. On August 16 and 17, Prime Minister Said Musa chaired two meetings of Belize's National Emergency Management Organization (NEMO). He instructed the newly created Coastguard to evacuate popular tourist sites Caye Caulker and Ambergris Caye by boat and plane. Authorities also evacuated Belize City's three hospitals, moving high-risk patients inland to the capital Belmopan. The mayor urged residents to leave Belize City and to make use of shelters in the capital.

The United Nations Disaster Assessment and Coordination team dispatched two members to Belize City and the rest of the team traveled to Belmopan. Government supplies were stored in Orange Walk, Corozal ready for post-storm relief. Essential equipment from the Red Cross and the Pan American Health Organization was stored in the elevated UNICEF building and the Belize City UN building was converted to a crisis center.

=== Gulf of Mexico ===
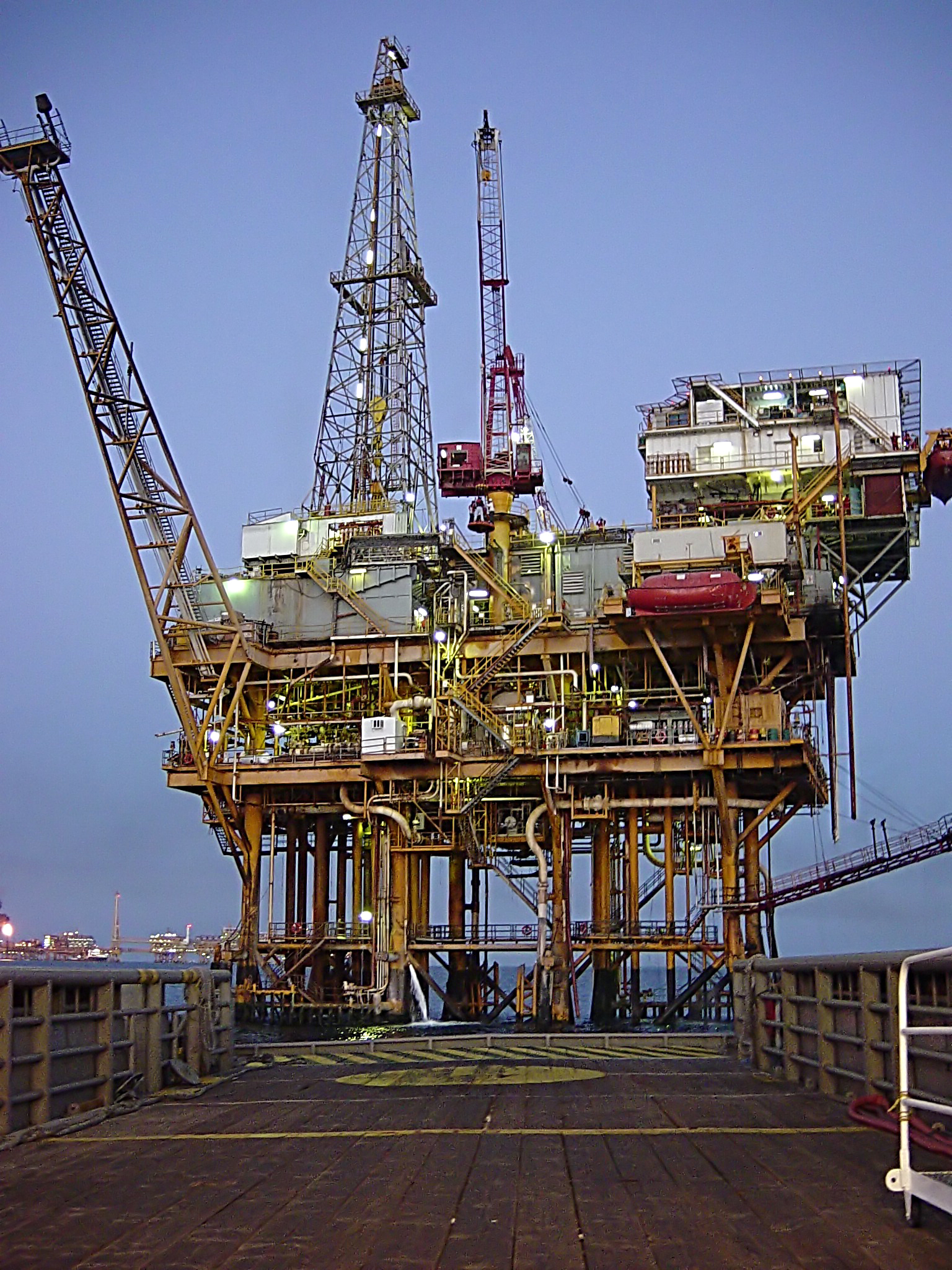
Hundreds of oil platforms, such as this one in the Gulf of Mexico, were evacuated in anticipation of Hurricane Dean.

Oil futures spiked on August 15 as analysts considered the impact of Hurricane Dean on refining capacity if it were to move into the Caribbean as predicted. Transocean evacuated 11 nonessential workers late on August 15 from an oil rig located about 160 mi (260 km) southeast of New Orleans. The company left about 125 personnel on board the structure. A day later Royal Dutch Shell evacuated 275 ancillary staff, following an evacuation of 188 due to Tropical Storm Erin.

On August 18, 2007, 10,300 barrels (1,640 m^{3}) of oil and 11 million cubic feet (310,000 m^{3}) of natural gas were shut-in per day, accounting for 0.8% of crude production in the Gulf of Mexico. By 11:30 am CST (1630 UTC), two rigs and one platform evacuated personnel.

Pemex, the state-owned Mexican oil company, made preparations to shut down oil production on August 19 ahead of Dean. It evacuated 13,360 workers from more than 140 oil platforms, using 55 boats and 29 helicopters. As the storm continued to intensify, the number of evacuated Pemex workers increased to 18,000 on August 20, and all 407 wells and drilling operations were abandoned. This reduced the worldwide production of oil and natural gas by 2.65 million barrels (421,000 m^{3}) and 2.6 billion cubic feet (74,000,000 m^{3}) per day, respectively.

=== Other regions ===
Throughout the Caribbean Sea, about a dozen cruise ships altered their routes to avoid Hurricane Dean. Honduras was put on a state of preventative alert for 48 hours, particularly the departments to the north of the country; the Bay Islands were on a state of red alert. There were places ready to accommodate 10,000 people for 15 days if necessary.

In the United States, the Louisiana Governor's Office of Homeland Security and Emergency Preparedness activated its Crisis Action Team on August 16 to monitor the storm and coordinate preparation. Governor of Louisiana Kathleen Blanco declared a state of emergency early on the evening of August 17, asking for a presidential emergency declaration to give Louisiana access to federal funds prior to any landfall. Texas Governor Rick Perry declared Dean to be an imminent threat to the state, and initiated a full-scale hurricane preparedness effort on August 17 when the storm was at least five days away. Prior to the storm, Texas suffered severe flooding from several June–July storms, and Tropical Storm Erin left the ground still saturated. Governor Perry feared that more rainfall from Dean would cause additional flash flooding, and had 250 Texas Parks and Wildlife Department crews on standby with boats to assist in potential evacuations. He was willing to deploy up to 10,000 Texas Military Forces soldiers, and did deploy several elements of the Texas State Guard who set up emergency shelters. The Texas fuel industry began surging fuel loads to coastal counties to ensure adequate fuel in the event of the hurricane causing a disruption to the fuel distribution system. In anticipation of evacuations, the Texas Department of Transportation began working on extra evacuation lanes and contraflow. NASA cut short the STS-118 mission as a precaution, in case Dean approached Mission Control at the Lyndon B. Johnson Space Center in Houston. To that effect, mission managers cut the mission's final spacewalk short by two hours, allowing them to land a day earlier than originally planned.

== Impact ==
Deaths and damage by country
| Country | Total deaths | Direct deaths | Damage (USD) | Source |
|---|---|---|---|---|
| Belize | 0 | 0 | $97 million | |
| Dominica | 2 | 2 | $162 million | |
| Dominican Republic | 6 | 6 | $40 million | |
| Guadeloupe | 0 | 0 | €100 million | |
| Haiti | 14 | 14 | Unknown | |
| Jamaica | 3 | 3 | $300 million | |
| Martinique | 3 | 0 | €400 million | |
| Mexico | 13 | 12 | $600 million | |
| Nicaragua | 1 | 1 | None | |
| Puerto Rico | None | None | $15,000 | |
| Saint Lucia | 1 | 1 | $6.4 million | |
| US Virgin Islands | None | None | $35,000 | |
| Totals: | 43 | 39 | >$1.21 billion | |
Because of differing sources, totals may not match.

Fifteen countries felt the effects of Hurricane Dean as its path through the Caribbean Sea claimed 42 lives. The hurricane first brushed the Lesser Antilles on August 17, 2007, and as it passed through the interior of the Caribbean its outer rain bands swept over the Greater Antilles. It passed Jamaica as a Category 4 hurricane, and strengthened to a Category 5 storm before it made landfall on Mexico's Yucatán Peninsula on August 21. Dean made a second landfall in Mexico on August 22 as a Category 2 storm.

=== Lesser Antilles ===
==== St. Lucia ====
Banana trees in Roseau Valley, St. Lucia, decimated by Hurricane Dean.

Power outages began in some neighborhoods at 6:30 p.m. AST (2230 UTC) August 16, over 12 hours before the storm arrived, and quickly spread over the entire island. The night saw heavy rains, 4 cm (1.6 in) at Hewanorra International Airport, and intense thunderstorms and by morning hurricane-force winds peaked at 80 knots (92 mph; 150 km/h). The winds uprooted trees, downed electricity poles, disabled bridges, triggered landslides, and damaged several roofs. Hurricane Dean tore the corrugated metal roof off Victoria Hospital's pediatric ward, but its patients had already been evacuated. St. Jude Hospital in Vieux Fort was also damaged when part of the roof blew off its medical ward and fell through the roof of the emergency room. A section of the cafeteria also lost its roof, but no one was injured in either incident.

The capital, Castries, was flooded by the storm surge and high seas deposited boulders and fishing boats on the streets. One person drowned in Sarrot after being swept away by a rain-swollen river while trying to recover a cow. Flooding was also reported in the town of Dennery where a number of residents had to be evacuated. Nationwide, damage to housing and buildings totaled EC$800,000. In the worst hit areas of the north, closest to Hurricane Dean's path, at least 15 roofs were blown off. Two small waterfront houses were completely destroyed in the town of Gros Islet. The heavy seas also sunk or damaged several boats and damaged coastal roads, in some places eroding the land itself. Coastal damage was estimated at $700,000.

Although the Ministry of Education reported that eleven schools had sustained a combined total of $300,000 of damage, the Ministry of Communications, Works, Transport, and Public Utilities reported that most of the country's other major infrastructure remained functional. They estimated that the cost to clean up all of the roads and drains was $900,000 and the cost to repair the utilities and communications damage was another $505,000. Saint Lucia Air and Sea Ports Authority reported another $922,000 of damage, but none of these sectors experienced prolonged disruptions to their functionality.

The island's 5,000 acres (20 km^{2}) of banana farms in Mabouya Valley, Roseau Valley, and Marc Marc were severely damaged with many of the plantations waterlogged or outright destroyed. An average of 75% of the crops were lost, with some fields in the Northern Farms losing up to 80% and in the Roseau Valley losing up to 85%. The cost to the agriculture industry was $13.2 million, bringing Hurricane Dean's total cost to $17.3 million (US$6.4 million in 2007) or 0.5% of the nation's GDP.

==== Martinique ====
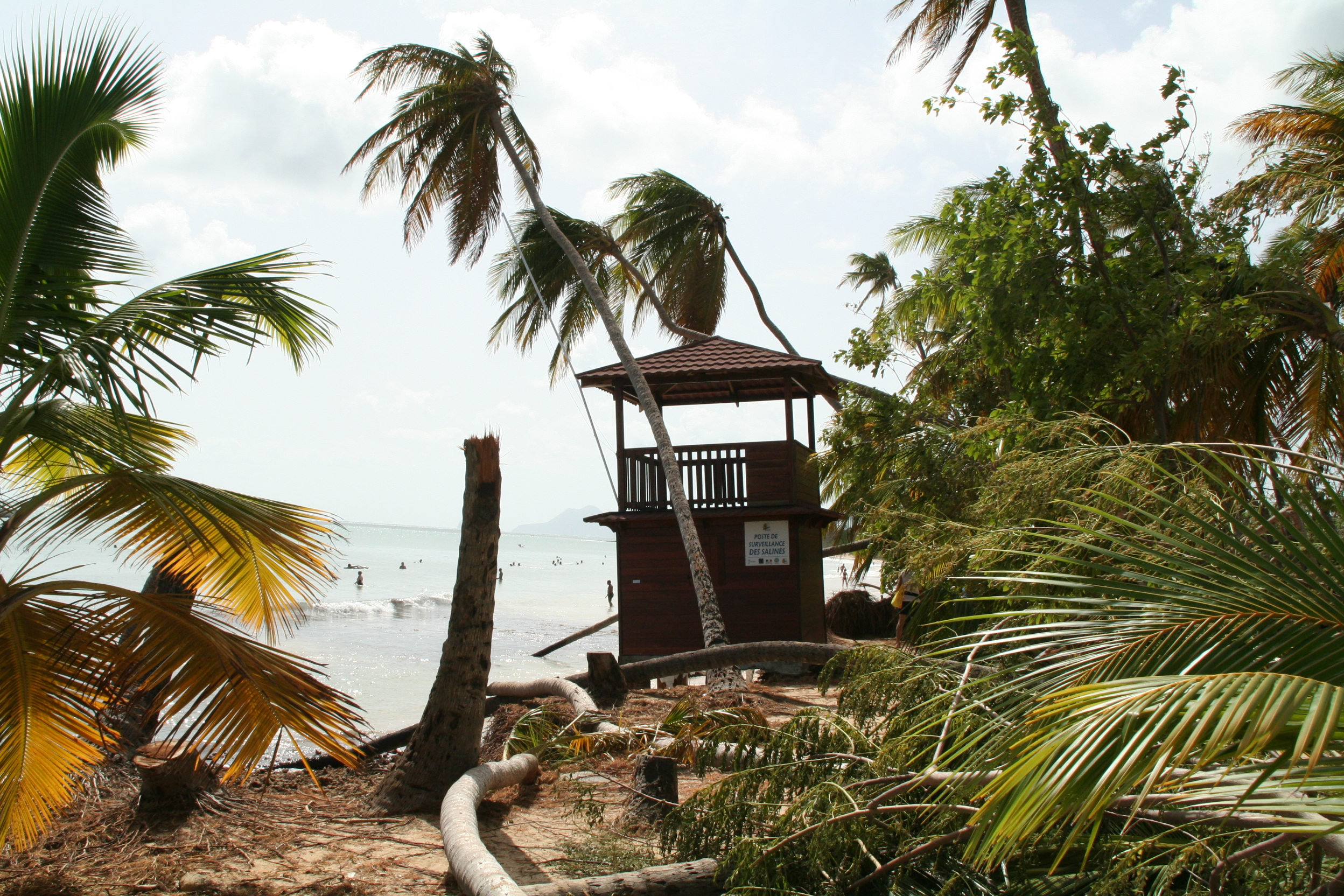
A lifeguard tower stands amongst fallen palm trees in Martinique, two days after Hurricane Dean's passage.

Martinique experienced 160 km/h winds with gusts to 215 km/h. The torrential rainfall, which reached 332 mm (13.1 in) caused flooding throughout the island, with the town of Rivière-Pilote flooding completely. The majority of Martinique's population were left without electricity, water, telephone, or food. The storm destroyed Martinique's entire banana crop, and 70% of the island's sugar cane plantations.

Three people were killed, many more were injured, and 600 Martiniquans were left homeless. The banana fields were completely destroyed. Officials estimated the damage on the island at about €250 million (US$337 million).

==== Dominica ====
In Dominica, a mother and her seven-year-old son died when one of a dozen landslide caused by the heavy rains fell onto their house. Landslides also blocked several roads in the mountainous country. In another incident two people were injured when a tree fell on their house.

Prime Minister Roosevelt Skerrit initially estimated that 100 to 125 homes were damaged, but in actuality Hurricane Dean damaged many more: 183 houses lost their roofs completely, 205 houses sustained partial damage to their roofs, 43 houses were completely destroyed, 115 houses suffered significant structural damage to components other than their roofs, and 225 non-dwelling buildings were damaged. In total, 771 buildings suffered significant damage.

Princes Margret Hospital, the island's only hospital, suffered damage to the roofs of the psychiatric and intensive care units. This led to heavy water damage, which also spread into the maternity ward and damaged the electrical system. All of the patients had been evacuated before the storm arrived. Because most equipment and supplies had also been removed, the hurricane's cost to the health sector was limited to the EC$3 million of structural damage.

The storm surge caused EC$15.5 million of damage to sea walls and another EC$15 million of damage to coastal bridges. Floods and landslides contributed EC$17.6 million of damage to the island's road network, while river floods destroyed EC$45.5 million of river walls. Flooding also devastated the agriculture sector and 95% of the crops were lost. Replanting a rehabilitation of the banana trees, 99% of which were destroyed, was expected to take several years.

==== Guadeloupe ====
Overall damage from Dean is fairly minor in Guadeloupe. However, the south of Basse-Terre Island suffered moderate damage and sustained wind gust up were between 74 and 78 mph (119 and 126 km/h) in areas such as Marie Galante and Les Saintes, in the Southern section of the island and destroyed 80% and cost €150 million (US$220 million) in Guadeloupe of the banana crop. The country's main exports.

==== Elsewhere ====
Although the winds and rain of the hurricane did not reach as far south as the islands of Trinidad and Tobago, sea swells on the east coast killed two people as they tried to secure a boat.

=== Greater Antilles ===
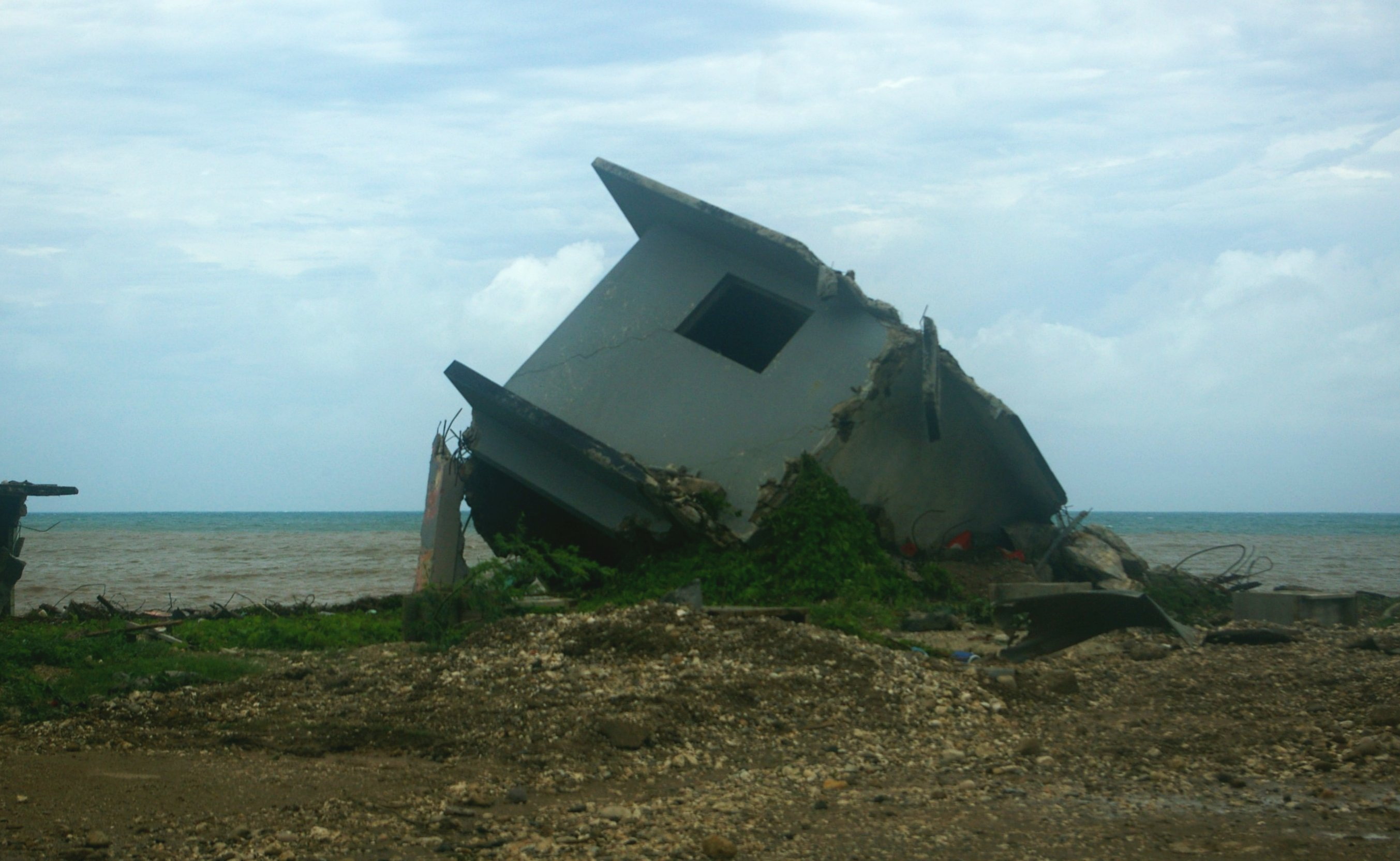
A house in Kingston, Jamaica destroyed by Hurricane Dean

Hurricane Dean passed just south of the Greater Antilles from August 17 to August 21. Having entered the Caribbean Sea as a Category 2 storm, it quickly strengthened to a Category 5 hurricane near Puerto Rico before weakening slightly to Category 4 strength as it swept under the rest of the Greater Antilles. It never made landfall in the island chain, but at Category 4 strength the storm passed just 40 km (25 mi) south of Jamaica. Strengthening again as it passed the islands, Dean regained Category 5 strength off the eastern tip of Cuba before making landfall in Mexico. The storm's winds, rains, and storm surge endangered life and property throughout the island chain.

==== Hispaniola ====
Hurricane Dean passed 270 km (170 mi) south of the Dominican Republic's capital, Santo Domingo, and although the island experienced relatively little wind, heavy rain flooded the streets. The moderate winds and heavy rains did not damage the agriculture sector as they did elsewhere in the Caribbean. Six deaths were attributed to the effects of the hurricane. The strong wave activity on the southern coastline attracted a crowd of onlookers and a 16-year-old boy was swept out to sea and drowned as he watched 16-foot (4.9 m) swells break over a road in Santo Domingo. Also, five fishermen drowned in the northern Santiago province after their boat capsized due to the effect of wind and torrential rain in the Tavera Dam, near the town of Baitoa. The victims were fishing along with three others that managed to swim ashore, and were believed to have ignored warnings issued by civil defense authorities. Rough surf destroyed at least 5 houses along the southern coast and damaged 316.

The outer fringes of Hurricane Dean swept over Haiti bringing heavy squalls. On Gonâve Island, thousands of people lost power and some took shelter in schools and churches. The roof of the Hopital St. Michel in Jacmel, damaged before the storm, leaked significantly leading to water damage in the operating room. Two people were killed in Tiburon and Moron, towns in the south and southeast of the island, respectively. Seven other storm-related deaths were confirmed but few details were given. Another four were injured in a sailboat after disregarding warnings to stay in port. Several hundred homes were destroyed due to the resulting landslides. In the department of Sud-Est, Nippes, Centre, and Artibonite, 5,154 people retreated to temporary shelters. Hurricanes typically pose significant hazards to potable water in Haiti, but Hurricane Dean produced only a modest 2.06 inches (52 mm) of rainfall. As such, the storm caused no major problems with water and sanitation, except in the town of Bainet, where the temperamental water system was compromised.

==== Jamaica ====
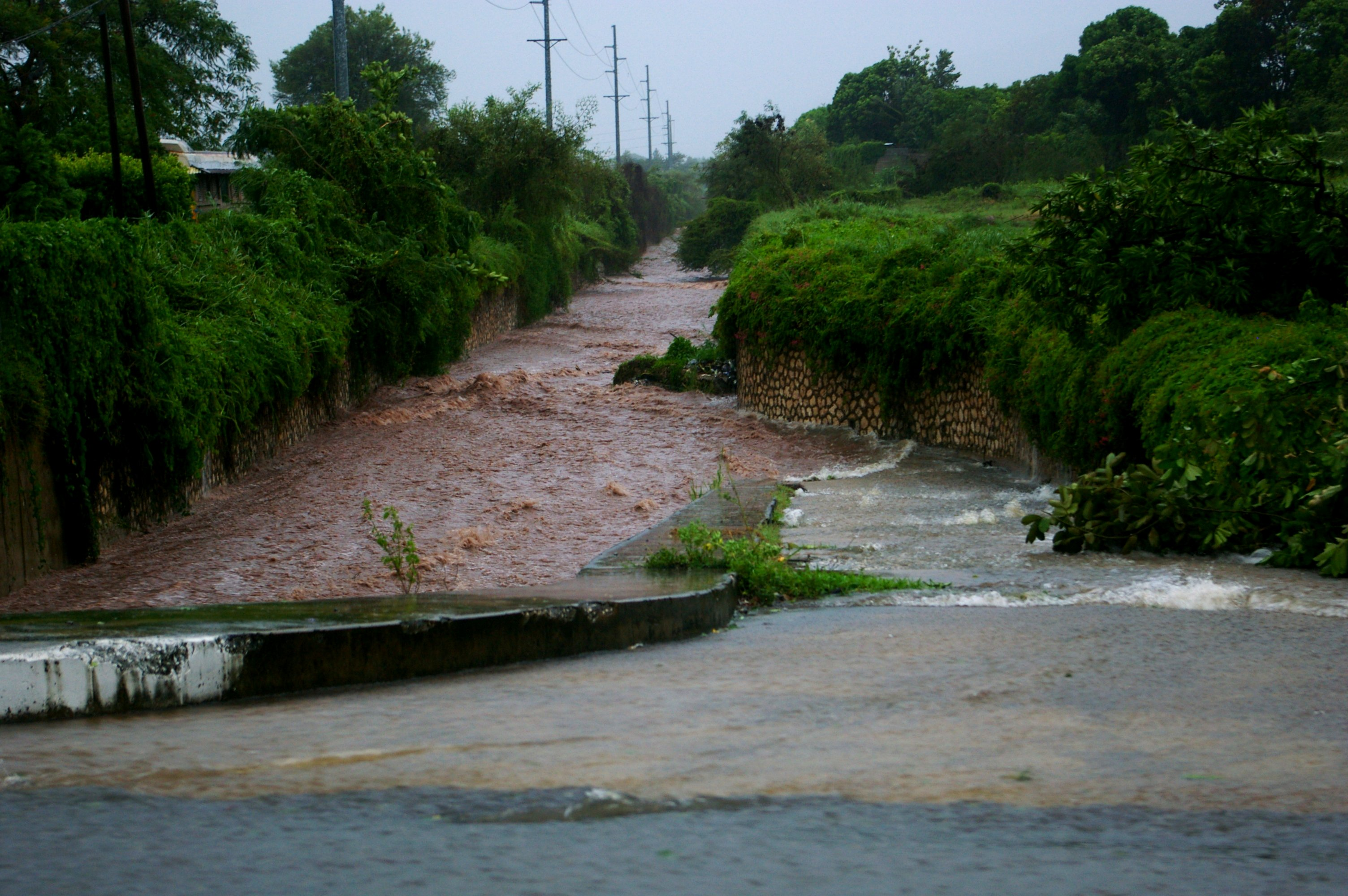
A road in Kingston, Jamaica, flooded by Hurricane Dean

In Jamaica, flooding was reported on the east of the island, and mudslides occurred on the northeast coast. In Kingston, buildings collapsed and houses had their roofing torn off by the strong winds, which felled trees and lampposts. A shoot-out between police and looters occurred in the parish of Clarendon. Over 1,500 roofs were lost, primarily to the hurricane-force winds. 3,127 houses were heavily damaged, 1,582 of which were left totally uninhabitable. Two-thirds of the homes in the southeastern parishes of Clarendon, St. Catherine, and Kingston/St. Andrew sustained significant damages. One man was killed in Clarendon by a collapsing roof, and a 14-year-old girl in Whitehorses, St. Thomas was killed by rock damage to her home. A third Jamaican was killed when he was struck by flying debris during the height of the storm.

Hurricane Dean affected 248 roads: 10 were blocked in the Kingston metropolitan region, 14 sections were blocked in St. Andrew, 43 were blocked in St. Catherine, 8 were blocked in the Western Region (Saint James, Hanover, Westmoreland, and Trelawny), and 110 were blocked in the Northeast region. Furthermore, the road from Kingston to the airport was covered in sand, boulders, and downed power lines.

Agriculture damage was widespread. Across the country 40% of the sugarcane crop, 80–100% of the banana crop, 75% of the coffee trees under three years old, and 20% of the top layer of the cocoa crop were lost to the storm. Insured damage in Jamaica was initially estimated at US$1.5 billion, but post-storm analysis showed that it was closer to US$310 million.

==== Elsewhere ====
Rain from Hurricane Dean closed several roads throughout Puerto Rico and there was heavy surf along the island's coast, but no deaths or injuries were reported. The hurricane's outer bands swept over Cuba between August 19 and August 21, bringing heavy rain and high seas, but sparing the island its damaging winds. In the Cayman Islands, rain flooded roads and there were high waves along the coast, but no deaths or serious injuries were reported. There were localized power outages and the water supply was shut off briefly, but the rest of the island's infrastructure was unaffected. Approximately 2,000 people weathered the storm in temporary shelters.

=== Mexico ===
Most intense landfalling Atlantic hurricanes Intensity is measured solely by central pressure
| Rank | Hurricane (Note: Storms with designations in quotation marks are officially unnamed. Tropical storms and hurricanes were not named before the year 1950.) | Season | Landfall pressure |
|---|---|---|---|
| 1 | "Labor Day" | 1935 | 892 mbar (hPa) |
| 2 | Melissa | 2025 | 897 mbar (hPa) |
| 3 | Camille | 1969 | 900 mbar (hPa) |
| 3 | Gilbert | 1988 | 900 mbar (hPa) |
| 5 | Dean | 2007 | 905 mbar (hPa) |
| 6 | "Cuba" | 1924 | 910 mbar (hPa) |
| 6 | Dorian | 2019 | 910 mbar (hPa) |
| 8 | Janet | 1955 | 914 mbar (hPa) |
| 8 | Irma | 2017 | 914 mbar (hPa) |
| 10 | "Cuba" | 1932 | 918 mbar (hPa) |
Sources: HURDAT, AOML/HRD, NHC

The hurricane made landfall near Majahual in Quintana Roo at 0830 UTC on August 21. Wind gusts of 200 mph (320 km/h) were reported. The state's tourist cities of Cancún and Cozumel were spared the worst of the storm, but it wreaked havoc in the state capital Chetumal, some 40 mi (64 km) south of landfall, causing significant flooding. Communication with the Mayan communities near the landfall location was initially difficult, but the town of Majahual, which had a population of 200, was "almost flattened" by the storm. Storm surge and high winds severely damaged or destroyed hundreds of buildings and had the strength to crumple steel girders. About 15,000 families were left homeless, primarily in small villages around Quintana Roo. At the Costa Maya cruise port, waves tore away portions of the concrete docks and destroyed the boardwalk. The damage made the port unsuitable for cruise ships, effectively freezing the region's tourism industry until they could be repaired. The hurricane's winds damaged 2.3 million ha (5.7 million acres) of jungle, almost all of it in Quintana Roo, Yucatán, and Campeche.

At its first landfall, the bulk of Hurricane Dean's damage was to agriculture. 12,000 producers suffered losses, mostly in the states of Quintana Roo and Yucatán. 30,000 hectares (74,000 acres) of habanero peppers were destroyed, along with 150,000 hectares (370,000 acres) of corn and 60,000 hectares (150,000 acres) of citrus. Extensive damage to fields planted with bananas, avocados, cucumbers, squash, jalapeño peppers, and other crops were also reported on the Yucatán Peninsula.

President of Mexico Felipe Calderón cut short a visit to Canada to return to Mexico and assess the damage. Hurricane Dean's Category 5 landfall–the first such landfall in the Atlantic basin in 15 years–took no lives. International organizations, including the United Nations, attributed this to the government's thorough preparations and forecasters' ample warning.

The next day, at 1630 UTC on August 22, Hurricane Dean made a second landfall, this time near the town of Tecolutla, Veracruz, as a Category 2 hurricane. Following the second landfall on the Veracruz coast, the town of Joloapan then saw the eye pass directly over it. In addition, two rivers in the mountains of the state of Hidalgo overflowed, and rain fell as far west as the Pacific coast. Veracruz Governor Fidel Herrera said there was "a tremendous amount of damage". Petroleum production was not severely damaged and quickly returned to normal, although its brief interruption was responsible for a 6% year-on-year decrease in third quarter.

Hurricane Dean, at its second landfall, dropped 4 to 8 in (100 to 200 mm) of rainfall across the western states of Jalisco and Nayarit. This rainfall triggered a mudslide in Jalisco which fell on 10 houses and killed one of the occupants. Landslides in Puebla killed five people, and another was crushed when a wall in his house collapsed. One person in Veracruz was electrocuted after touching a power line while repairing his roof. In Michoacán, as the outer bands of the storm swept over the state, a man sheltering under a tree was struck by lightning. Two women died in Hidalgo when heavy rain collapsed their house's roof. Another man drowned while trying to cross a rain-swollen river in Tlacolula, Oaxaca. The heavy rains caused dozens of smaller landslides throughout the country, particularly in Veracruz and Tabasco, but most of them caused no fatalities. At least 50,000 houses were damaged to varying degrees throughout the country. Although Dean's rains caused flooding as far inland as Mexico City, where they closed a portion of Puebla-Mexico highway, the damage was concentrated in the states of Quintana Roo and Veracruz.

As with its first landfall, Hurricane Dean damaged crops throughout its impact area. In Puebla it destroyed 135,000 hectares (330,000 acres) of corn and more than 22,000 hectares (54,000 acres) of coffee, while in Veracruz 15,000 hectares (37,000 acres) of various crops were lost. Unlike in Belize and the Eastern Caribbean, the storm spared the sugarcane crop in Veracruz.

Between the hurricane's two landfalls, Dean affected an estimated 207,800 people in the states of Quintana Roo, Campeche, Veracruz, Hildalgo, Puebla and Tabasco. The storm damaged 85 miles (137 km) of power lines and left more than 100,000 people without electricity. Landslides, storm tides, and widespread structural damage combined to compromise water sources throughout the country. The extent of the damage was never calculated at a federal level, but hundreds of villages lost access to fresh water in the days following the storm. Hurricane Dean killed 12 people in Mexico but none of the deaths occurred during its first and most powerful landfall on the Yucatán Peninsula. Between the two landfalls the storm caused a total of Mex$2 billion (US$184 million) of damages.

=== Belize ===
The town of Corozal on Belize's northern border experienced the worst conditions in the country. Trees were downed throughout the town, and minor flooding was reported. Eight thousand were displaced to shelters, though all returned home in less than two days. Throughout the entire country, the Belizean Ministry of Health reported no storm-related fatalities and only a few minor injuries.

Belize's agricultural sector received significant damage. Its sugar cane fields and papaya crops suffered extensive damage. The Belizean Government's National Emergency Management Organization estimated Dean's damage to the papaya industry at BZ$30 million and to the sugar industry at 6,000 acres (24 km^{2}) worth BZ$3.6 million. Belize Sugar Industries Ltd. reported that the country's sugar crop that year was the worst on record, producing 980,000 lb (445,000 kg) of sub-standard cane, compared to 1.2 million lb (545,000 kg) of high quality cane the year before. More than 1000 people were out of work as a result of the damage to the papaya and sugar cane plantations. The government attempted to improve the next crop season in 2008 by providing fertilizers to the farmers whose land had been damaged by Dean the year before. Prime Minister Said Musa estimated that it would cost US$10 million to replace or repair all the damaged houses in Belize.

=== Other regions ===
No land effects were reported in Nicaragua but a four-year-old girl drowned on a boat that sank amidst high winds and waves at the mouth of the Kukra River.

While the hurricane itself never approached the United States, heavy surf and rip currents were reported on the beaches of Florida. One person drowned and at least 35 people had to be rescued from the turbulent waters at Siesta Key caused by Hurricane Dean. Rough seas produced by Dean caused minor flooding in Dauphin Island, Alabama. Damages from the flooding amounted to $100,000. The remnant circulation of Dean, after lingering off the Pacific Coast, moved inland by Santa Barbara, California, and brought heavy thunderstorms and localized flooding to coastal Southern California on the morning of August 26. The remnants crossed the Mojave Desert on the morning of August 27. Las Vegas, received a daily record of 0.58 in (15 mm) of rain, with flash flooding and minor damage.

== Aftermath ==
Despite Dean's significant damage, it did not have severe effects on infrastructure, and the non-agricultural sectors of most affected nations recovered quickly. Most cruise lines diverted their ships away from the Western Caribbean in anticipation of Hurricane Dean's passage, though by August 27 all were back on schedule, except those with damaged ports in Belize and the Yucatán. The Lesser Antilles and the Greater Antilles were especially quick to resume servicing cruise lines, as their ports opened within days.

=== Lesser Antilles ===
St. Lucia and Dominica activated their Caribbean Disaster Emergency Response Agency (CDERA) response systems to help assess and correct the storm's damages. CDERA acknowledged their requests and, based on preliminary damage assessments, initiated a Level Two response which allowed for the event to be managed at the country level with regional assistance limited to technical support and resources where required. Barbados, Saint Vincent and the Grenadines, and Grenada also activated their CDERA response systems. Although they were not directly affected by the hurricane they used the opportunity to test the systems' operating procedures. The other affected islands of the Lesser Antilles, Martinique and Guadeloupe, are not members of CDERA.

CDERA dispatched a technical support team of Bajans, Montserratians, and Grenadians to Dominica on August 22 to assist in developing a damage assessment. The Government of Venezuela sent 500 blankets, 500 sheets, 3 large tents, 120 units of tarpaulin, water, and medical supplies to Dominica. The Government of Canada pledged $2 million in immediate aid to the afflicted countries. The U.S. Government, through the U.S. Agency for International Development (USAID), declared a disaster in Dominica and St. Lucia and provided $25,000 and 75 rolls of plastic sheeting to Dominica for emergency shelter repairs and an additional 50 rolls of plastic sheeting to St. Lucia through its National Emergency Management Organization. CDERA petitioned the Caribbean Development Bank for a US$100,000 relief grant to assist with relief efforts and damage repairs in St. Lucia and Dominica.

Although St. Lucia suffered significant damage to its residential structures and agricultural land, its airports and hotels were operational within days having needed only small-scale repair work. Hospitals and other essential services kept running on standby power supplied by independent generators to assist in the cleanup and recovery efforts. Roads connecting the north and south of the island were quickly cleared. LUCELEC, the nation's only electricity provider, worked around the clock to repair dozens of downed electrical poles and restored electricity by August 21. The rest of the island's infrastructure weathered the storm. Two shelters were opened for hurricane-affected residence, and USAID/OFDA provided US$40,432 of assistance to the island.

Dominican Prime Minister Roosevelt Skerrit declared August 19, 2007 to be a national day of prayer and thanks-giving. The destruction of 546 residences forced approximately 1,000 people into 100 shelters. A USAID disaster specialist liaised with the Dominican Office of Disaster Management and arranged for assistance to the order of US$60,648 of relief supplies and $25,000 of Emergency Shelter supplies.

In the days after to storm, some residents of Martinique, still without electricity, food, water, or telephones, took to looting stores and bakeries. Utility workers from Guadeloupe, French Guiana, and France arrived on August 19 to help restore electricity.

The Secretary of State for the French Overseas, Christian Estrosi, visited Martinique shortly after the hurricane to inspect the damage. He was joined by French Prime Minister, François Fillon on August 22 and the two surveyed the damaged to Guadeloupe and Martinique, the two hardest hit French colonies. A week after the storm hit 11,000 people in Martinique were still without telephone and electricity and in the worst hit parts of southern Guadeloupe the water was still not drinkable. Banana crops in Guadeloupe, 80% of which were destroyed by Dean, will not recover until March, 2008.

=== Greater Antilles ===
On August 23 the Haitian government sent food, sachets of potable water, mattresses, and medicines to the town of Bainet in the Sud-Est department. On August 24 the Pan American Development Foundation sent food to all people living in temporary shelters and Venezuela delivered 11 tonnes of emergency food to Sud-Est in 500 family bags. Hurricane assistance was then compounded by the country's standard humanitarian assistance programs and became indistinct from the country's continued poverty crisis.

=== Jamaica ===
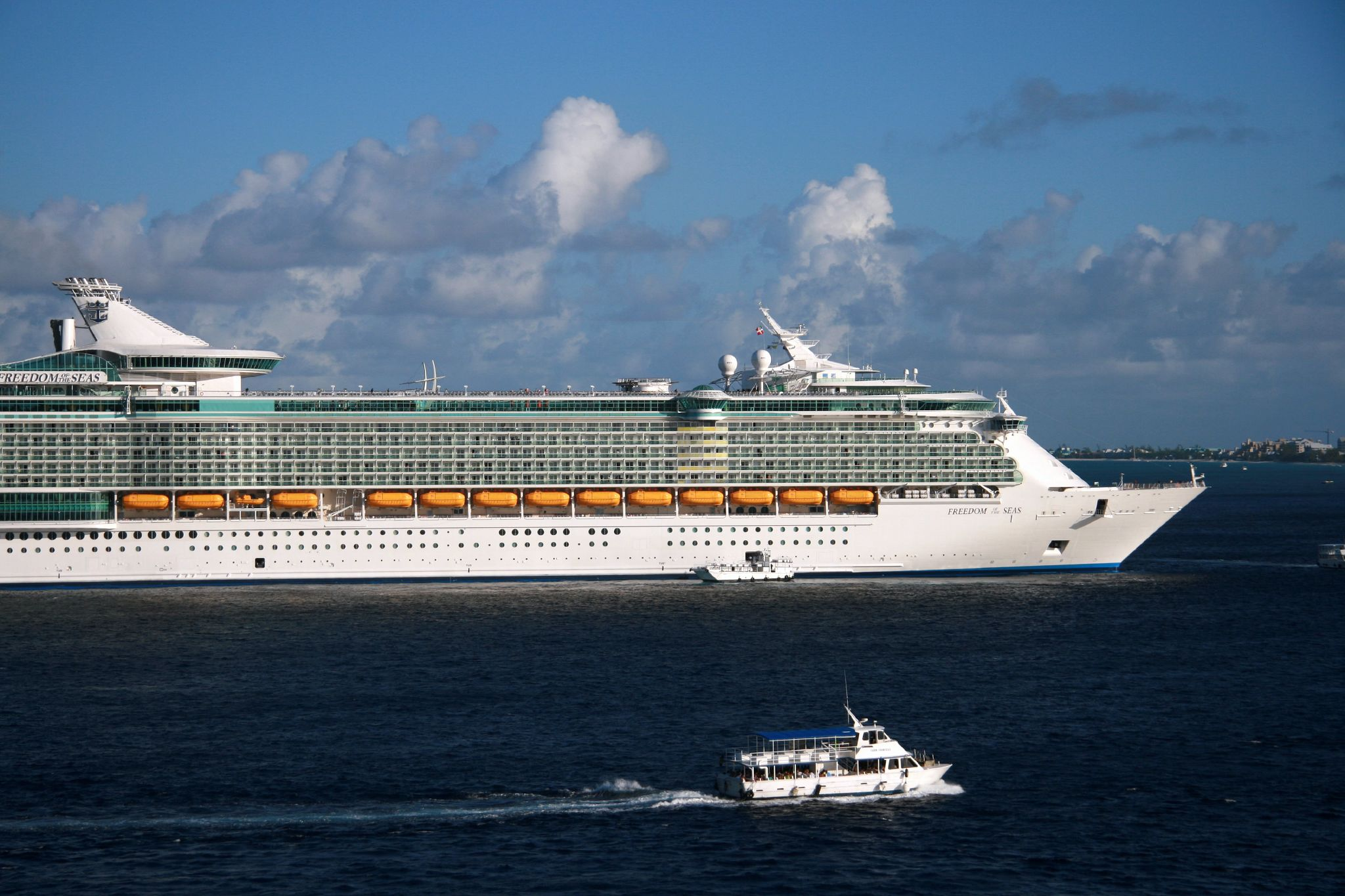
Freedom of the Seas, a Royal Caribbean ship, was the first cruise ship to visit Jamaica after Hurricane Dean. It called into Ocho Rios on August 22.

The World Food Programme immediately placed 5,500 Jamaicans on complementary food assistance, a daily ration of 1900 kJ (450 kcal) of High Energy Biscuits, for two weeks. On August 22, three days after the hurricane struck the island, the United States Agency for International Development (USAID) sent US$398,000 of emergency supplies to Jamaica's Norman Manley International Airport. These supplies included mattresses, blankets, plastic sheeting, hygiene kits and water containers. The Inter-American Development Bank (IDB) provided a US$200,000 grant to support the relief effort. The Chinese Red Cross, despite dealing with Typhoon Sepat, sent US$30,000 to its Jamaican counterpart for the purchase of emergency relief supplies.

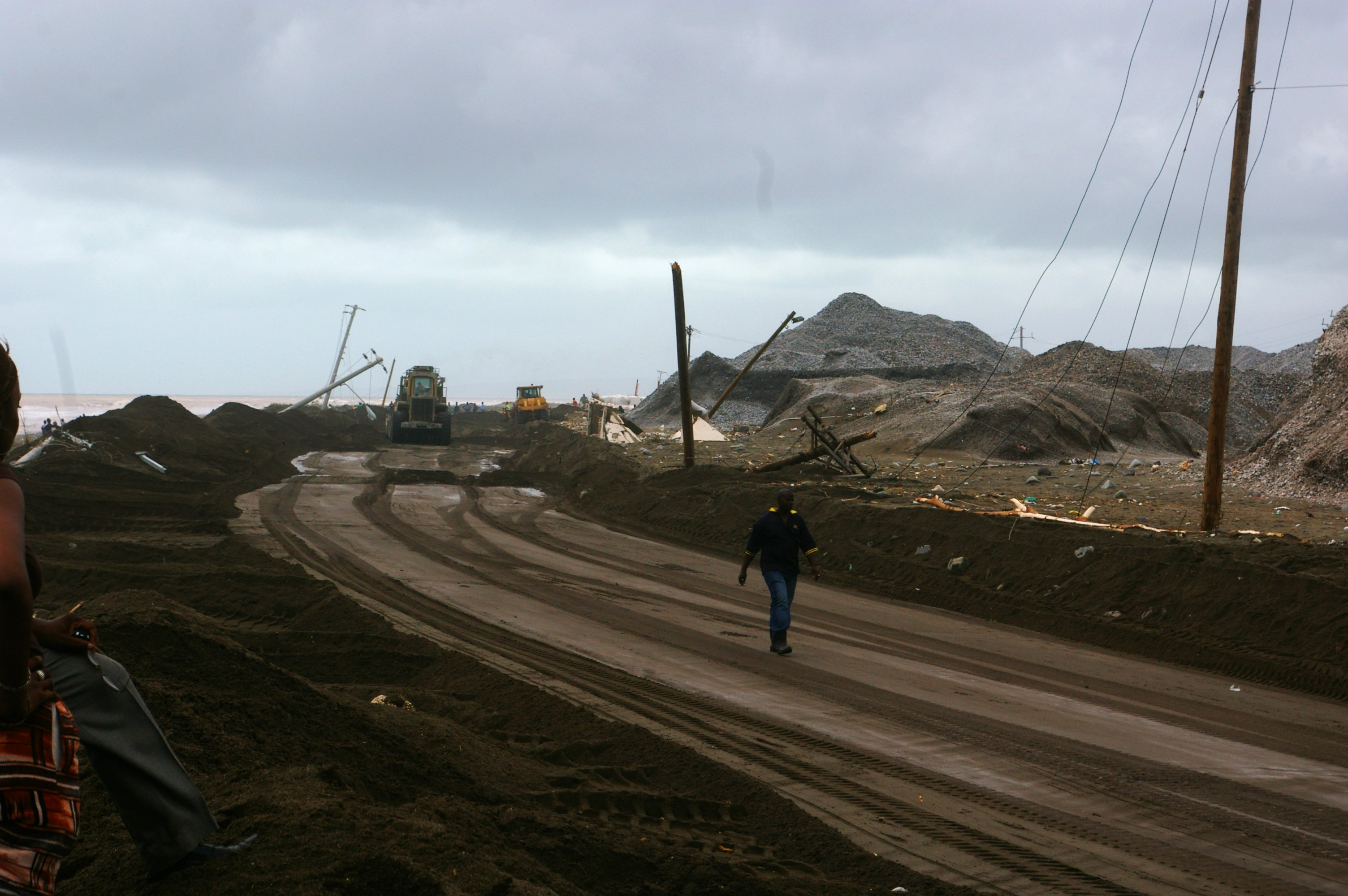
Heavy machinery clearing sand off the road to Norman Manley International Airport after it was buried by Hurricane Dean

On August 24, Prime Minister Portia Simpson Miller announced that her government would provide JA$225 million in emergency assistance to the country's agriculture sector, especially the parishes of Portland, Clarendon, St. Thomas, Manchester, St. Catherine and St. Elizabeth. JA$100 million was immediately allocated to the purchase of fertilizers, JA$25 million to the Blue Mountain coffee farmers, and the Agriculture Ministry's JA$50 million fruit tree programme was accelerated. She also announced that the National Housing Trust had established a JA$500 million programme to provide loans at 6% per annum for emergency repairs. The National Housing Trust also made JA$200 million available to the Hurricane Relief Fund. The government provided tarpaulins, 10,000 of which were shipped in after the storm, free of charge to patch houses with damaged roofs.

The Jamaican general election scheduled for August 27 was postponed until September 3, at which point they went ahead as planned. Opponents accused Prime Minister Portia Simpson-Miller of unnecessarily extending the state of emergency (and related curfews) to maintain her political control as predictions at the time suggested that she and her party would be ousted by the opposition. She and her party ultimately did lose the election, although Dean's light damage was not thought to have been a major factor.

By the end of the summer of 2008, banana production in Jamaica was returning to pre-Dean levels. With the help of JA$1.1 billion of aid from the EU's Banana Support Programme, thousands of acres were replanted. Banana chips were the first products ready for export at the beginning of the summer, with fresh banana production following shortly thereafter as the agricultural industry returned to normal.

=== Mexico ===
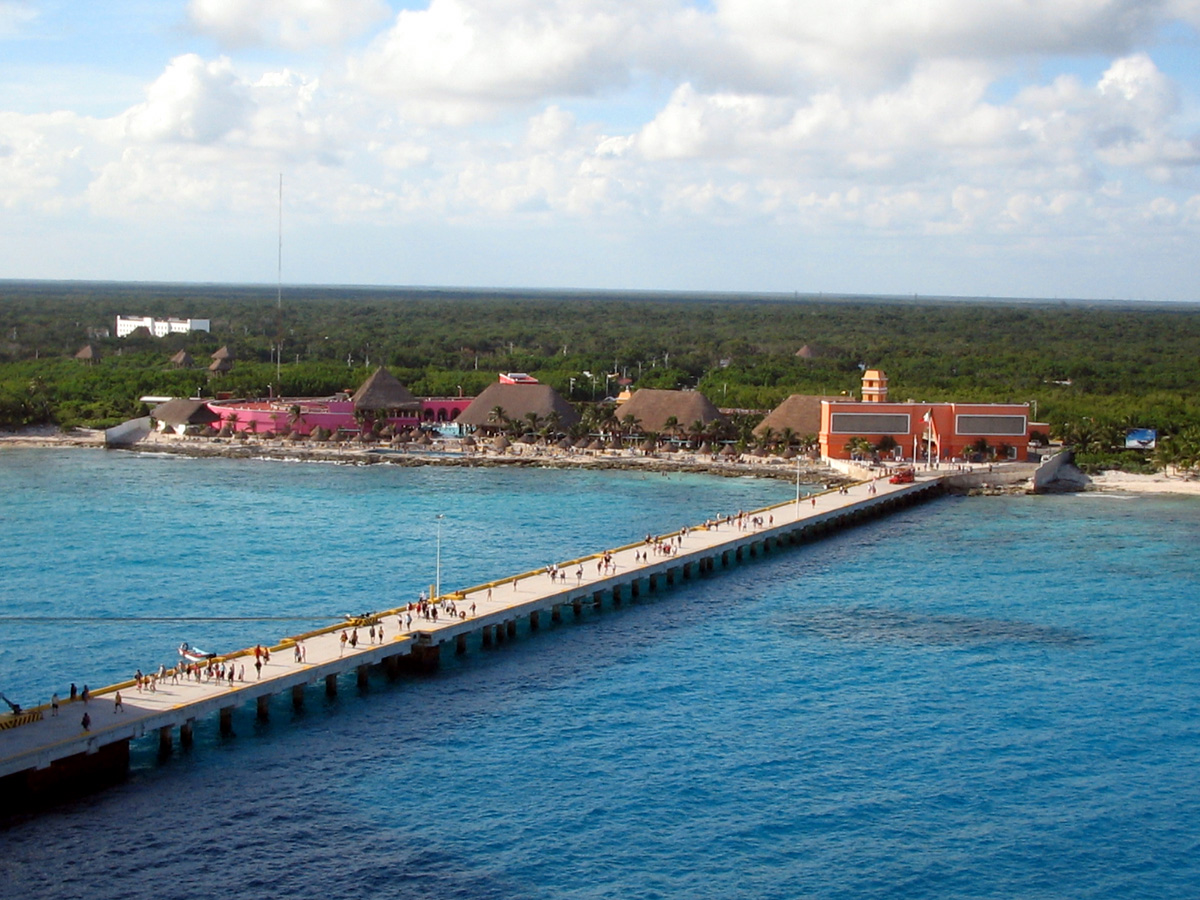
The pier and resort in Costa Maya were destroyed by Hurricane Dean but rebuilt the following year.

Post-storm analysis showed that, while less deadly, Dean's first and more powerful landfall caused significantly more infrastructural damage than its second. Where the landfall occurred at the town of Majahual specifically, and the state of Quintana Roo generally, communities took longer to recover than in the rest of the country. Quintana Roo Governor Félix González Canto reported that although the cleanup in the state capital of Chetumal was completed within three weeks, it took more than six months to fix all of the region's rural roads. Unable to handle the hurricane's aftermath, the state government appealed to federal authorities and secured Mex$755 million (US$74.8 million) of aid. Combined with the state's contribution of $270 million (US$26.7 million), a housing-repair fund of over $1,025 million (US$101.5 million) was established. In the three months immediately following the storm, over 37,000 houses were rebuilt or repaired using monies from this fund.

In the days following the hurricane, immediate access to clean water was a priority for international aid agencies working in Mexico. The National Commission of Water spent another $25 million (US$2.47 million) of federal funds repairing the damaged infrastructure for irrigation and drinking water.

Carnival Cruise Lines and Royal Caribbean Cruises, the world's two largest cruise operators, diverted their ships away from the damaged cruise port of Puerto Costa Maya. Their plans originally expected diversions until at least 2009, but the central government was quick to fund rebuilding of the destroyed concrete piers. By June 2008 they were rebuilt to accommodate even larger ships than before, and ships scheduled stops there for September 2008.

The federal government was initially lauded for its swift and thorough preparation to which most observers, including the United Nations, attributed Dean's low death toll. However, after the storm there were several accusations of political motivation in the distribution of aid. Members of President Felipe Calderón's Partido Accion Nacional (PAN) distributed bags of bread, funded by the nation's disaster relief coffers, carrying the party's logo. In Veracruz Governor Fidel Herrera was accused by both the PAN and his own Partido Revolucionario Institucional (PRI) of using state resources, including hurricane relief, to support the campaigns of PRI candidates.

=== Retirement ===
Due to the hurricane's widespread impact, the name Dean was retired by the World Meteorological Organization in May 2008, and it will never be used again for an Atlantic tropical cyclone. The name was replaced with Dorian for the 2013 season.

== See also ==
- List of Category 5 Atlantic hurricanes
- List of Mexico hurricanes

- Hurricane Beulah (1967) – Category 5 hurricane that took a similar path.
- Hurricane Emily (2005) – Category 5 hurricane that took a similar path.
- Hurricane Beryl (2024) – Category 5 hurricane that took a similar path.
