= La Treille, Saint Lucia =

Coordinates: 13°56′N 61°00′W

La Treille is a town on the island of Saint Lucia; it is located towards the heart of the island, between Sarot and Morne Ciseaux.
