= Banana production in the Caribbean =

Production of bananas in the Caribbean areas

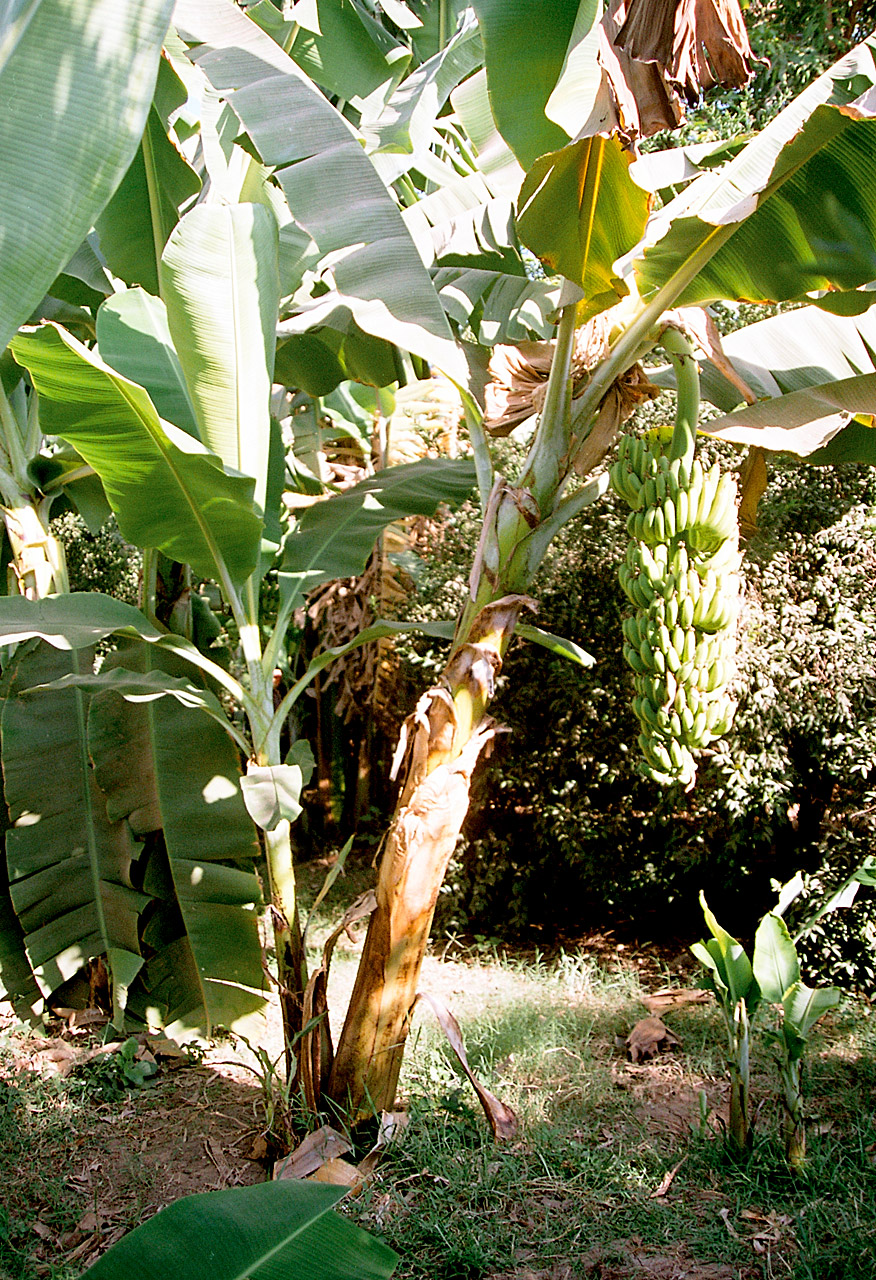
Banana plants

Banana production in the Caribbean is widespread. Bananas are cultivated by both small farmers and large land holders. The plant is perennial and is planted either in pure stands or in mixed cultivation, such as in Jamaica. Countries where bananas are a main export crop are Belize, Costa Rica, Dominican Republic, Honduras, Jamaica, Guadeloupe, Dominica, Martinique, Saint Lucia, Saint Vincent and the Grenadines, Grenada, Trinidad and Tobago, Nicaragua, Panama, Suriname and Colombia.

== Farming activities ==
=== Conditions for growth ===
- Temperature: Temperatures should vary from 26 to 31 °C (79 to 88 °F). The temperature should not fall below 11 °C (52 °F).
- Rainfall: Rainfall should at least average 1,750 millimetres (69 in) per annum and must be well-distributed.
- Relief: Altitude must not exceed 300 metres (980 ft) for the plant to grow overnight fully. Sheltered valleys that do not experience strong winds provide good growing conditions since the banana plants have shallow roots and can easily be uprooted.
- Soil: Light, acidic, clay and medium to alluvial soils provide suitable conditions.

=== Land preparation ===
Mechanical tilling of the land is undertaken on gentle slopes. On flat land, harrowing is carried out to renew the soil fertility.

=== Cultivation practices ===
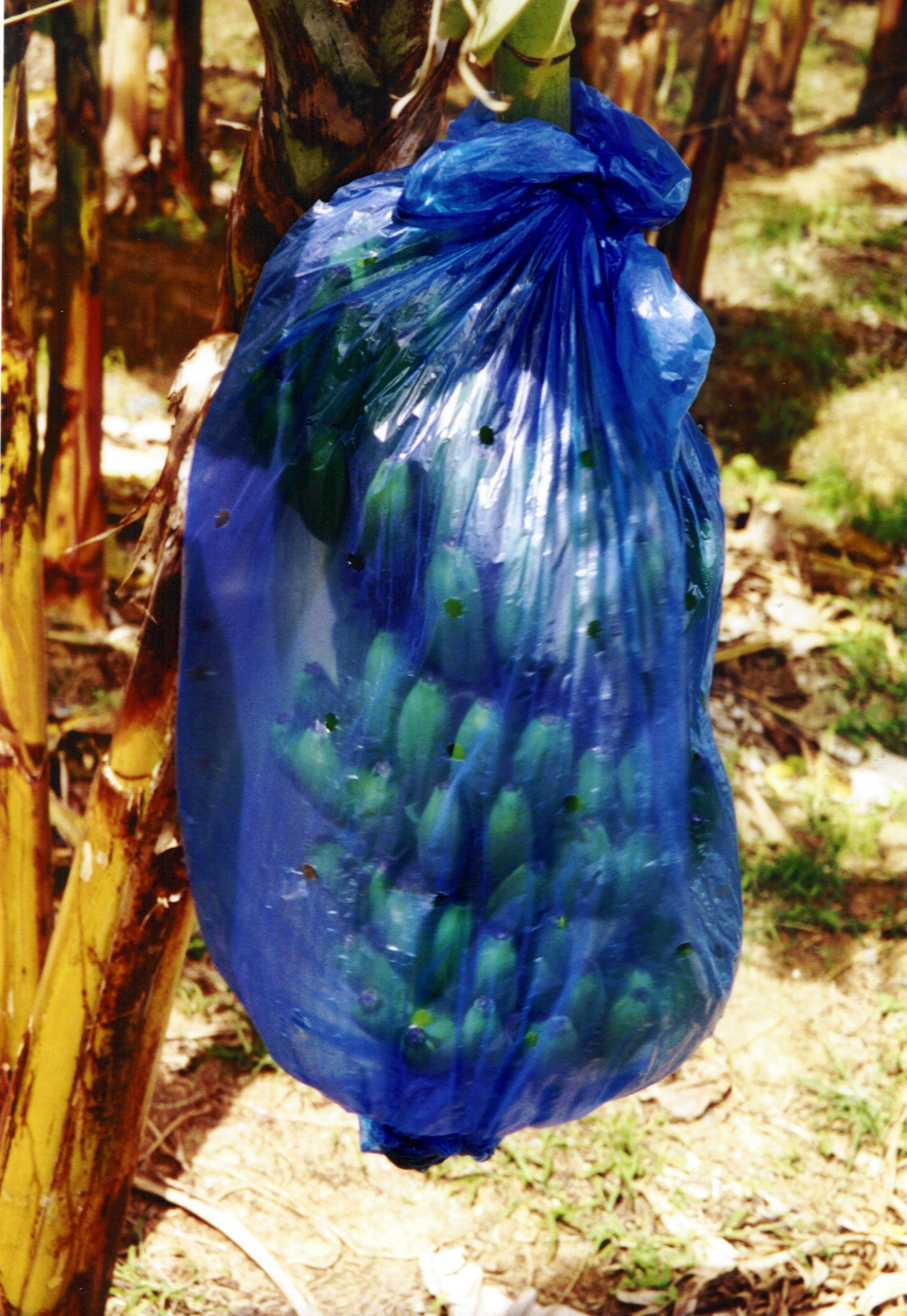
A banana bunch is covered by a polythene bag to prevent disease

The plant is propagated by roots or from suckers and takes one year to reach maturity. Each planting area consists of one bearing plant. When the crop is bearing, bunch sleeving is carried out. Each bunch is covered with a polythene bag and treated with insecticide.

=== Harvesting and transportation ===
When the mature fruit is about 12 months old, it is cut directly from the tree in a green condition. A cutter grooves and cuts the tree near the base while a backer catches the cut bunch. The upper part of the pseudo-stem is not removed as it is suitable for mulching. New plants or suckers are left to grow from the rhizomes. The bananas are carried on the heads of laborers to the nearest road, then transported by trucks and motor trailers to the packing shed. From the plantations, bunches of bananas are loaded onto cable ways, leading to the packing shed where the choicest fruit is selected for export. As the crop is perishable, timing is of utmost importance. Fruit must be cut within a week's time to meet a shipping load.

=== Exporting ===
At the boxing plant, the bananas selected are hung on a conveyor and removed by hand from the stalk. They are then placed in tanks of water for at least four minutes to wash off the latex and other impurities. Every precautionary method must be taken against damage to the skin of the fruit. Wad wrapping and polythene bags are commonly used. The latex flow tends to be absorbed by the wad wrapping.

At the port, the fruit is graded according to quality. It is weighed and placed in refrigerated compartments of ships at temperatures of 13 °F (−11 °C). It undergoes regular changes of air to discharge ethylene gases produced by the chemistry of the fruit. In this way, the fruit can withstand long sea journeys and arrive in good condition. Shipping schedules are arranged about eight weeks in advance.

== Importance of the banana industry ==
The industry provides a very valuable source of foreign exchange. Dominica earned about EC$40 million in 1998 and produced 30,000 tons in 1999; St.Lucia produced 80,000 tons and earned about EC$87.6 million in 1999; St. Vincent about EC$38.9 million in 1997 and produced 43,000 tons in 1999: Belize earned about BZ$43.16 million in 1998 and produced 78,000 tons in 1999; Jamaica earned about US$29.6 million in 1999 and produced about 130,000 tons and Dominican Republic produced 432,000 tons.

Other Caribbean producing countries are: Haiti produced 290,000 tons in 1999; Cuba produced 115,000 tons in 1999; Colombia produced 1,600,000 tons in 2005; Costa Rica produced 2,200,000 tons in 2005; Mexico produced 2,000,000 tons in 2005; Guatemala produced 733,000 tons in 1999; Honduras produced 861,000 tons in 1999; Nicaragua produced 69,000 tons in 1999; Panama produced 650,000 tons and Venezuela produced 1,000,000 tons.

Banana cultivation is a major employer of rural labor as it is a labor-intensive industry. In Dominica, it is the second largest employer after the government, providing work for 6,000 farmers with another 700 employed at boxing plants. In St. Lucia, it provides employment for about 10,000 workers. In St. Vincent, there are about 5,000 banana growers.

== Uses of the banana ==
- Eaten when ripe for punches
- Used to make banana flour, baby food, banana chips, banana bread, wine, banana porridge, banana paper & banana ketchup
- The banana stem is used in cloth production
- Rope can be made from the dried stalk
- Bananas can be used as animal feed, helping to reduce imports

== Problems facing the banana industry ==
The small size of farms makes for inefficient production and contributes to a low standard of living. In Dominica, 8% of the fruit is supplied by 51% of the banana farming population, medium growers supply 41% and over 51% is supplied by large land holders. In the Windward group generally, the majority of the farming population owns less than a third of the banana acreage. In Grenada, there are a large number of peasant plots given to intercrop cultivation with bananas. In St. Vincent, the pattern is the same, although output is greater from the estates. The small size of farms provides a low income to farmers as they are unable to apply fertilizers or minimize the risk of insect pests and diseases.

Low income returns to farmers are experienced when low prices are offered though shipping and marketing agents. As a result, farmers are unable to effectively increase their production. They are unable to apply fertilizers or to minimize risks caused by diseases. The industry is plagued with high costs and low prices. Bananas are also plentiful in Latin America and Africa, thus imposing a threat to the Caribbean's position on the British market. The United Kingdom imports a high percentage of their fruit from the Caribbean. Too great a supply reduces the price of the fruit. This is an economic disadvantage since the fruit is perishable.

In Grenada, the Moko disease (Ralstonia solanacearum) has caused much destruction in the northern part of the island while it has eradicated the industry in Trinidad and Tobago out of commercial production during the 1960s. Black sigatoka (Mycosphaerella fijiensis) causes premature ripening of the fruit. It has wiped out 40% of Dominica's 4,000 hectares (9,900 acres) of banana cultivation. Even when the fruit is exported there is a high incidence of ship-ripe fruit which arrive at their destination in poor condition.

== See also ==
General

- Banana Framework Agreement

Jamaica

- Banana Sector Retraining Project
- Banana Support Programme
