= Durandeau =

- Location in Saint Lucia
- Coordinates: 13°55′N 060°59′W
- Country: Saint Lucia
- Quarter: Anse la Raye

Durandeau is a town on the island of Saint Lucia; it is located towards the heart of the island, between Sarot and Dame de Traversay.
