= Banana Sector Retraining Project =

- Headquarters: Kingston, Jamaica
- Website: HEART Trust/NTA Planning and Project Development Division

The Banana Sector Retraining Project was a program run by the HEART Trust/NTA during 2008 and 2009. It aimed to retrain displaced workers and farmers in the banana/plantain industry and those whose jobs may disappear because of loss of preferential treatment in the European market. It was implemented in the six traditional banana-growing parishes: St. James, St. Catherine, St. Thomas, St. Mary, Portland and Clarendon.

The project was a small-scale pilot. It did not provide jobs directly for people and was not used to influence changes to the banana/plantain sector, but its findings and outcomes were intended to help inform and develop a larger scale programme of assistance to workers in Jamaica's banana/plantain communities. What they learnt and the experiences of participants in the project were intended also to help inform the design of training and certification programmes to be implemented by HEART Trust/NTA (and/or other institutions) in the future.

== History ==
The 15-month project began in October 2008 and ended in December 2009, at a cost of €354,700, funded by the EU and HEART Trust/NTA. It consisted of continuous training needs analysis, career counseling workshops, pre-vocational, vocational skills and computer-based training. It taught participants modern skills for transition to new areas of employment or skills to improve banana productivity. The ultimate goal of the program was to ease participant’s uncertainty about their future and give them sustainable skill sets.

A follow up phase two, designed from the results of the project, was planned for post December 2009 and was intended for a larger target group.

== Project goals ==
- To understand the scale of the negative changes to Jamaica's banana and plantain communities
- To find out which communities and individuals are impacted
- To find out what skills and education the affected people have
- To find out how training and development can help them earn a living

== Project beneficiaries ==
People dependent on the banana/plantain producing industry:

- Small Banana/Plantain Farmers
- Banana/Plantain Workers
- Port Banana/Plantain Workers
- Immediate families of the above
- Members in the above communities

== Project activities ==
Career Counselling Workshops

Workshops featured career counselling, motivational speeches and try-a-skill exercises where participants got a taste of skills such as housekeeping, construction and agricultural applications.

Pre-vocational training programmes

Focus on the employability skills of the participants in areas such as: communicating effectively in the workplace and working in a team.

Vocational and Skills Training

These were provided through existing programmes at HEART institutions or with partner institutions. Participants were required to pass a grade nine level test that concentrated on general knowledge, practical mathematics and English Language.

Computer Based Training

ICT enabled remedial training programmes comprising WordCraft – reading and writing, and MathCraft – grades 1–9 were conducted over a six-month period. Not all project participants received this type of training.

== Project partners ==
- Ministry of Agriculture
- Ministry of Education
- Rural Agricultural Development Authority
- All Island Banana Growers Association
- Jamaica Agricultural Society
- Social Development Commission
- Jamaica Producers
- Fair Trading Commission

== Gallery ==
Launch of The European Union Banana Support Programme in Jamaica

HEART Trust/NTA's previous Executive Director, Donald Foster, signs

== See also ==
- Banana Support Programme
