= Dame de Traversay =

Town on Saint Lucia

- Location in Saint Lucia
- Coordinates: 13°55′N 060°59′W
- Country: Saint Lucia
- Quarter: Anse la Raye

Dame de Traversay is a town on the island of Saint Lucia in the Anse la Raye Quarter; it is located towards the heart of the island, just below Durandeau.
