= Roseau Valley =

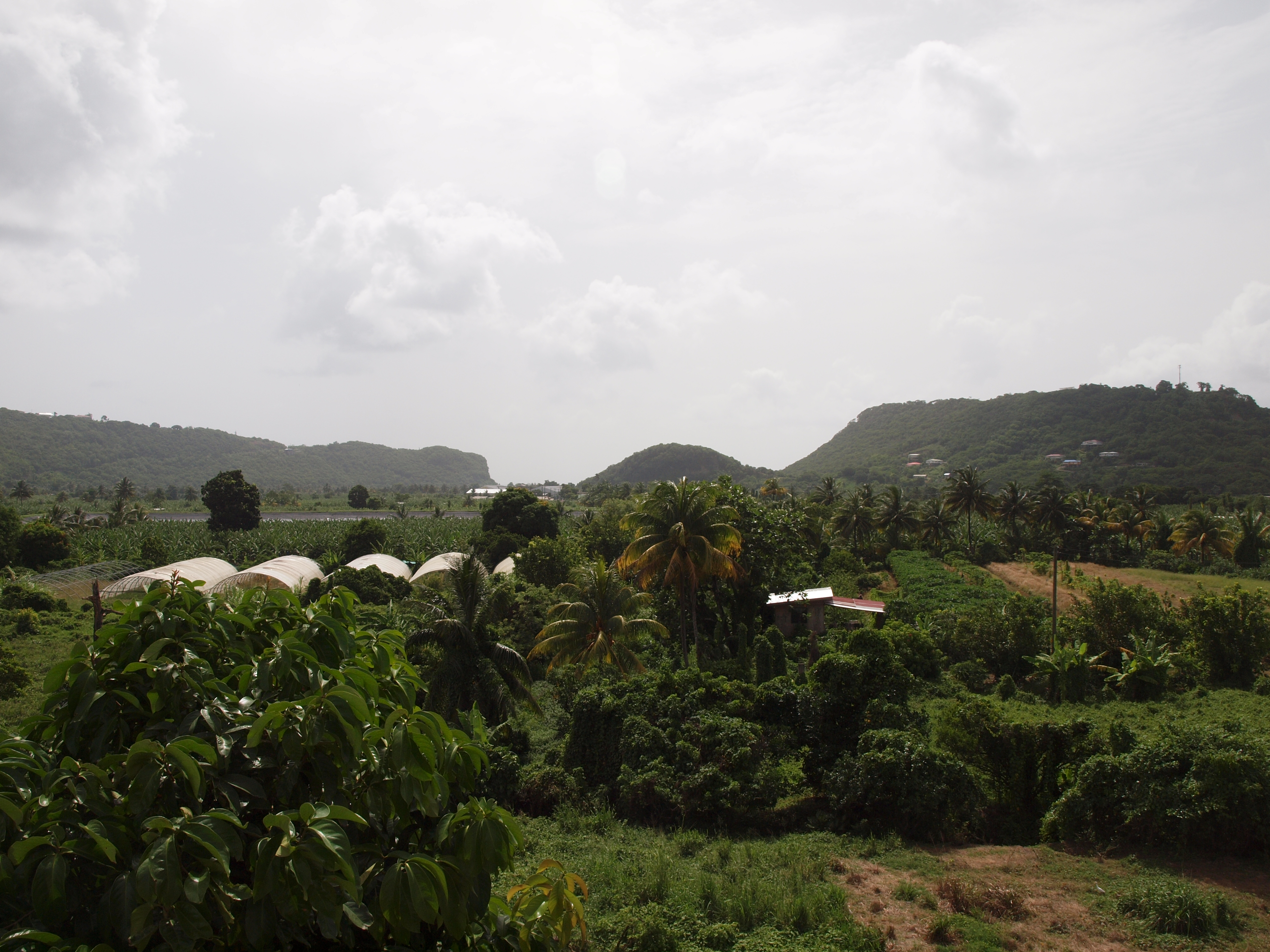
- Looking west over the Roseau Valley from Roseau Combined School

- Roseau Valley in Anse la Raye District of Saint Lucia
- Coordinates: 13°57′11″N 61°01′26″W
- Country: Saint Lucia
- District: Anse la Raye
- Elevation: 8 m (26 ft)

The Roseau Valley is a second-order subdivision in the island nation of St. Lucia. It is home to the island's largest banana plantation. The 2010 population of the Roseau Valley was 227.

== Geography ==
The Roseau River runs through the valley and enters the sea at Roseau Bay. It is the longest river in St Lucia and the Roseau Reservoir is a major source of drinking water.

There are several settlements within the valley in the Anse la Raye District:

- Bois d'Inde, 13°56′34″N 61°00′46″W
- Coolietown village, 13°57′29″N 61°00′50″W
- Derrière Lagoon village, 13°56′34″N 61°00′57″W
- Jacmel village, 13°57′02″N 61°01′01″W
- Millet village, 13°54′11″N 60°59′42″W
- Morne Ciseaux second order subdivision, 13°56′09″N 61°00′12″W
- Morne d'Or second order subdivision, 13°56′58″N 61°00′22″W
- Pilori Point, 13°57′23″N 61°02′17″W
- Roseau Bay, 13°57′36″N 61°02′05″W
- Roseau Dam, 13°54′01″N 60°59′17″W
- Roseau village, 13°57′13″N 61°01′28″W
- Roseau Estate, 13°57′00″N 61°02′00″W
- Vanard second order subdivision, 13°56′08″N 60°59′37″W

== Products ==
Originally the valley had been used for the cultivation of sugar and a railway (since been lifted) was used to transport the sugar from further up the valley to a processing plant at Roseau. Until the 1980s there was a thriving farmer's and fisherman's market at Roseau, but since then most people now travel to the market at Castries. More recently, it was a major production area for bananas. As of 2022, the fertile valley is being developed due to the local banana industry being out-competed by international contenders.

The Saint Lucia Distillers, Limited was located in Roseau in 1972. It has produced several prize-winning rums since .

== See also ==
- List of cities in Saint Lucia
- List of rivers of Saint Lucia
- Districts of Saint Lucia
