= Morne Ciseaux =

- Location in Saint Lucia
- Coordinates: 13°56′40″N 61°00′11″W
- Country: Saint Lucia
- District: Anse la Raye

Population
  - Total: 160
- Morne Ciseaux 2nd-order division

Morne Ciseaux is a town in the Anse la Raye District of the island nation of Saint Lucia. There is also a second-order subdivision, Morne Ciseaux, that had a population of 160 in 2010. The town is located towards the heart of the island, between Vanard and La Treille.

== See also ==
- List of cities in Saint Lucia
- Districts of Saint Lucia
