= Requetemu =

Requetemu is a NOAA weather station in the Mexican state of San Luis Potosí. Its coordinates are 21.93°N 98.90°W. It is 89m (292 feet) above sea level.
