= Marc Marc =

- Location in Saint Lucia
- Coordinates: 13°57′N 060°58′W
- Country: Saint Lucia
- Quarter: Castries

Marc is a community in the Castries Quarter of St. Lucia in the Lesser Antilles. It is located at an elevation of 528 feet.

Airports nearest to Marc from the city centre:

- Vigie Airport, Saint Lucia (distanced approximately 8.3 km)
- Hewanorra Airport, Saint Lucia (distanced approximately 24 km)
- Lamentin Airport, Martinique (distanced approximately 71 km)
- Arnos Vale Airport, Saint Vincent (distanced approximately 93 km)
- J. F. Mitchell Airport, Bequia (distanced approximately 110 km)
