= Dislocated worker funding =

Dislocated worker funding is typically used to help workers in events of mass employment loss. A dislocated or displaced worker is defined as an individual who has been laid off or received notice of a potential layoff and has very little chance of finding employment in their current occupation when attempting to return to the workforce. Displaced workers are most frequently found in the manufacturing industry (ex: steel, automotive, coal). Legislation addressing training for these workers was first introduced in 1959 through the passing of the Area Redevelopment Act of 1959. Over the years, legislation funding these programs has included wording holding states and private businesses accountable for the roles in the dislocation of workers. Due to the importance of this funding and the negative economic impact of displaced workers, the United States has passed continuing legislation as recent as 2014 and 2015.

== Legislation ==
=== Early Legislature (1950s - 1970s) ===
After World War II, the Service Member Readjustment Act of 1944, known as the GI Bill, established a program to help returning Soldiers obtain technical skills and reintegrate into the workforce. This act established funding for veterans allowing them to purchase homes and attend college. The success of this program demonstrated the need for programs for individuals who became displaced from their job, at no fault of their own. In response to changes in the automotive industry in the 1950s, the federal government passed the Area Redevelopment Act of 1959, establishing the first program to assist workers with reemployment. This program provided individuals with training opportunities and relocation assistance, geared specifically to those displaced due to changes in the automotive industry, As technology improvements led to further changes in manufacturing and global trading became more popular, more workers began to find themselves without a job. This resulted in the passing of Trade Adjustment Assistance (TAA) under the Trade Act and the Manpower Development and Training Act (MDTA) in 1962. MDTA allocated funding for educational programs and on the job training for adults in the middle of their careers. TAA provided compensation to workers who were laid off due to an increase in imports.

As the economy stabilized in the 1960s, legislation transitioned its focus to employment programs addressing the needs of disadvantaged youth and welfare recipients. The Comprehensive Employment and Training Act of 1973 (CETA) addressed these concerns in addition to supporting dislocated workers. CETA combined programs established by MDTA and nine other programs by providing classroom based training, private sector job training, public service employment, and work experience through subsidized jobs. The program ran for 10 years but was not resigned into legislation in 1982 after reports of mismanagement, failure to provide required services, and servicing ineligible individuals .

=== Late 1900s legislature (1980s - 1990s) ===
Due to the failures of CETA, the federal government expanded provisions under TAA and passed the Job Training Partnership Act of 1982 (JTPA). JTPA played a large role in the establishment of current training and assistance programs. Title III of JTPA dealt specifically with dislocated workers. It increased the responsibility of local governments to establish state level programs for displaced workers (mandating monitoring of local programs based on identified criteria), required private businesses to establish Private Industry Councils (PICs), and placed most of its funding in areas providing training and job assistance.

To qualify under JTPA, an individual must have met the following criteria:

- "receive notice of layoff after working with the employer for at least three years and unlikely to return"
- "be laid-off due to a facility closure"
- "be unemployed for at least 15 weeks after employment with the same employer for three years"

Part of the outlined guidelines mandated that states provide a dollar for dollar match with the federal government, with reductions made for states with higher than average levels of unemployment. However research has indicated that matching requirements impacted a states decision on who could participate in the program. Research published in 1989 reported that in 1986, JTPA programs for displaced workers only assisted 7% of all eligible workers. Despite the strict requirements of JTPA, its failure to truly address the needs of dislocated workers led to the passing of the Economic Dislocation and Worker Adjustment Assistance Act (EDWAA) effective July 1989. EDWAA differed from JTPA in that it offered training and assistance with job searching and placement. The program also covered the cost to relocate, counseling, and assistance with services like transportation and childcare. From 1990 to 1991, more than 1.5 million jobs were permanently lost. These staggeringly high numbers resulted in the federal government's provision of almost $1.3 billion in 1991 to support displaced workers with job training and job assistance through programs created by the EDWAA and Trade Adjustment Assistance programs (TAA). In 1998, President Clinton passed the Workforce Investment Act (WIA). This act replaced previous acts and established programs for all workers, not just those who were displaced. Services for dislocated workers were provided under Title I of WIA. Under WIA, two programs were established, a National Reserve and state grants. States were allocated funding based on the percent of individuals who were unemployed. Additionally, the act established over 3,000 job assistance sites nationwide. These sites combined the previous programs under one location, allowing for greater visibility and communication between the programs.

=== Current Legislation (2000 - present) ===
The Workforce Investment Act was initially written to last until 2003, however, the success of the program resulted in legislature continuing this program until 2014, when it was replaced with the Workforce Innovation and Opportunity Act (WIOA). WIOA established federally funded worker grants for those who were displaced from their job due to economic changes or natural disasters. In addition, it specifically addresses funding for programs in areas with high numbers of dislocated members of the military and their spouses. In addition to WIOA, dislocated worker funding is allocated in the Trade Adjustment Assistance Reauthorization Act of 2015. The Reauthorization Act of 2015 is a continuation of the original program developed in 1962. It provides similar programs to those of outlined in WIOA, but it is specifically geared to individuals who lost their jobs due to an increase in imports. Benefits under this program include:

- Up to 130 weeks of training, 104 if not in need of remedial training
- 26 weeks of unemployment insurance (Trade Readjustment Allowance - TRA)
- Workers participating in training are eligible for an additional 52 weeks of TRA
- Job search and relocation allowance of up to $1,250
- Health Care Coverage tax credit, paying 65% of qualifying premiums

The Reauthorization Act also developed programs to reimburse displaced workers for their cost of health insurance by providing a tax credit of up to 72.5% of health premiums and providing additional supplemental income for individuals over the age of 50. For those wishing to receive compensation or assistance under this act, a minimum of three individuals, a union, or a representative must file a petition with the Department of Labor, Employment and Training Administration, Division of Trade Adjustment Assistance.

== Dislocated Worker Grants ==
One type of dislocated worker funding established by the Secretary of Labor is the National Dislocated Worker Grants. These grants were established in 2014 by Section 170 of the Workforce Innovation and Opportunity Act. They provide resources for states or other applicants to mitigate job losses caused by large, unexpected layoffs due to changes in industries or natural disasters. The grants have been used for a variety of reasons in the United States since their creation, with a common reason being layoffs attributed to aging energy infrastructure such as end-of-life coal power plants or closing coal mines.

Disaster relief related grants are provided to ensure individuals displaced to a new area due to a natural disaster are provided employment assistance. These grants also cover assistance for individuals who are self employed. As part of the disaster relief efforts, individuals are given 12 months of temporary employment, increased from six under WIA. These twelve months can receive an extension of twelve additional months by the Secretary of Labor if deemed necessary.

=== Examples in the United States ===
- September 2019, the US Department of Labor announced it would be allocating more than $3.5 million in dislocated working funding grants to workers in the Kentucky coal industry.
- September 2019, the Massachusetts Executive Office of Labor and Workforce Development was awarded more than $500,000 in grants from the US Department of Labor The grants are intended for workers impacted by the Pilgrim Nuclear Power Station's closure in 2019.

== Relevant Research ==
=== "Does Training Work for Displaced Workers", Leigh, D. (1990) ===
Leigh conducted a review of nine different demonstration projects and displaced worker programs within the United States and abroad. Programs analyzed included federally funded demonstration projects, state displaced worker programs, and Canadian and Australian programs. Four major policy questions were addressed.

1. Do some types of training work better than others? Job search assistance (JSA) has the greatest impact on reemployment of displaced workers with the lowest costs. Additionally, Leigh found that training does positively impact reemployment of individuals, however not enough to off-set the costs of the programs. While on the job training is beneficial, it fails to have a consistent impact on the workers.
2. Do some groups of workers benefit more from training than others? Women and individuals under the age of 45 benefit more from program services. Little differences were observed between white and black employees.
3. To the extent that training improves reemployment prospects, does it work by increasing post-training wage rates or by reducing the duration of unemployment? Evidence from the Buffalo program indicates a boost in hourly wages for those re-employed within the first six months post program. Programs in Texas and New Jersey found short-run positive impacts on wage.
4. Referring specifically to vocational training, how do we know what to train workers to do? Skill training does not significantly improve reemployment of displaced workers. Issues were noted in the selection criteria and strength of the training program. Employment Training Panels (ETPs) appear to demonstrate more success when given thorough training and placed in training-related jobs.

=== "Does Trade Adjustment Assistance Make a Difference?" Reynolds, K. & Palatucci, J. (2012) ===
Reynolds and Palatucci looked at 5,125 unemployed individuals who were impacted by changes in imports, thus eligible for assistance under TAA. All individuals were displaced from the manufacturing industry between 2003 and 2005, were approved to receive services under Transition Adjustment Assistance (TAA), and were exited from the program by the fourth quarter of 2005. A control group was established by using data from the January 2006 Current Population Survey Displaced Worker Survey. Using propensity score matching, researchers found that individuals participating in TAA had more difficulty in finding a new, good-paying job when compared to other displaced workers who did not receive the assistance. Additionally, the researchers found that TAA makes no significant contribution to the employment of its participants. Ultimately, Reynolds and Palatucci found that recipients who completed TAA with training were 10-12% more likely to be reemployed at higher paying jobs than TAA participants who did not participate in training. The authors suggest that TAA programs should reconsider decision criteria for waivers from required TAA training.
