= Banana Support Programme =

The European Union's Banana Support Programme was a financial support program for the Jamaican banana industry that ran between 1999 and 2013. Since 1999, the European Union (EU) has provided more than €40 million in aid to the industry. The programme had two components, the Rural Diversification Programme (RDP) and the Banana Improvement Programme (BIP). The former funded projects for encouraging diversification of the rural economy into other fields including bee farming and agro-tourism as well as improvement of rural infrastructure, whereas the latter supported development in the banana industry itself.

== See also ==
- Banana Sector Retraining Project
