= North-West Caribbean Donor Group =

The North-West Caribbean Donor Group, chaired by the United Nations Development Programme (UNDP), is designed to provide first-responders in the event of emergencies in the northwest Caribbean. It is made up of UN agencies, international relief agencies and non-governmental organizations.
