= Vanard =

- Location of Vanard within Castries District in Saint Lucia
- Coordinates: 13°56′37″N 60°59′40″W
- Country: Saint Lucia
- District: Castries, Anse la Raye
- 2nd-order administrative division: Vanard

Population (2010)
  - Total: 384
- Vanard region

Vanard is a community on the island of Saint Lucia; it is located towards the heart of the island, near Sarot. The region of Vanard is in both Anse la Ray and Castries Districts.

== See also ==
- List of cities in Saint Lucia
- Casteries District
