= Shut-in (oil drilling) =

Oil supply management technique

In the petroleum industry, shutting-in is the implementation of a production cap set lower than the available output of a specific site. This may be part of an attempt to constrict the oil supply or a necessary precaution when crews are evacuated ahead of a natural disaster.

In April 2020, as a result of oil futures trading negative, Oklahoma and New Mexico voted to allow wells to shut-in in order to reduce production to combat oversupply.

== See also ==
- Artificial scarcity
- Flooding the market
- Limitation of the Vend
- Production quota
- Slowdown
