= Kukra River =

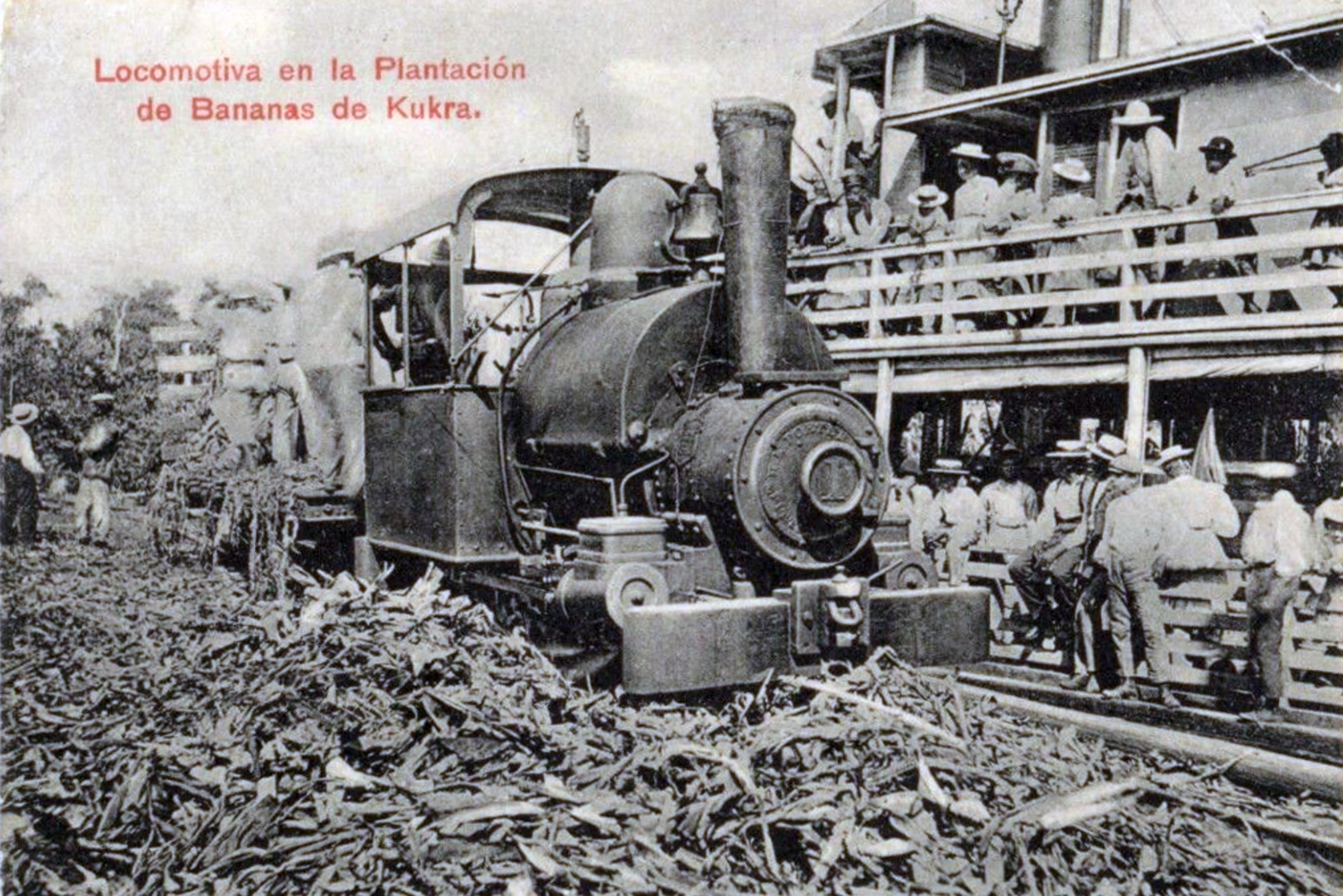
- Steam locomotive of a banana plantation meets a steam boat on the Kukra River, circa 1909

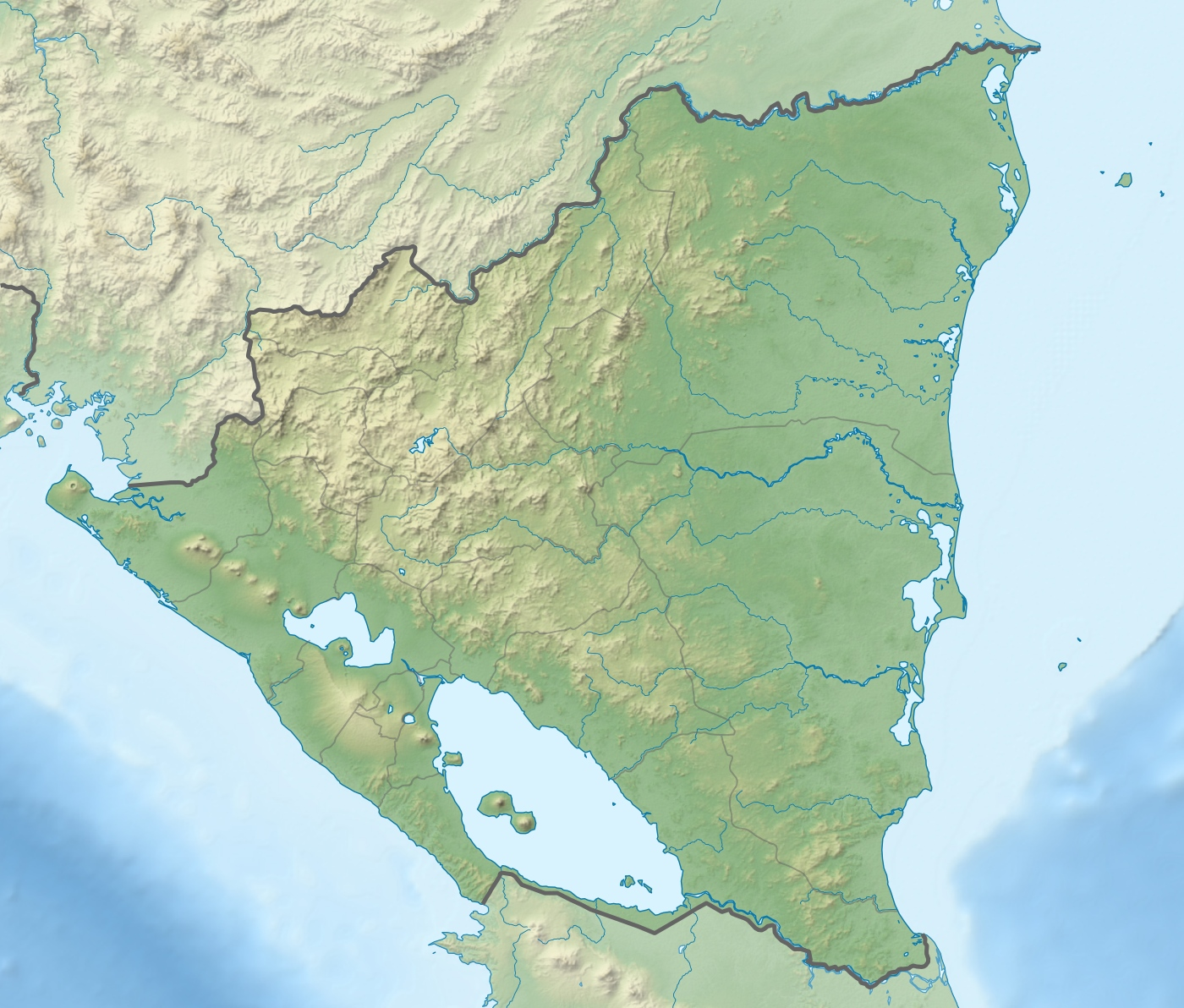
- Location of mouth

Location
- Country: Nicaragua

Physical characteristics
- Mouth
  - coordinates: 11.9°N 83.816667°W

The Kukra River (Spanish: Río Kukra; alternates: Rio Cookra, Rio Cucra, Rio Cukra, Río Cookra, Río Cucra, Río Cukra) is a river of Nicaragua. It lies in the southeast of the country and is inhabited by two Rama communities and various mestizo settler communities. Much of the river falls within the Rama-Kriol Territory and is thus within the jurisdiction of the Rama-Kriol Territorial Government. It is located south of Bluefields and empties in Bluefields Bay.

== Economy ==
Along with Bluefields and Rio Escondido, the Kukra River has been an important indigenous and Creole agricultural area. The Rama grows grains near Bluefields Bay and along the Kukra. Farming is the only industry along the Kukra.

== Fauna and flora ==
The ant species Pheidole psilogaster has been found in the Kukra River region.
