= Sarot =

- Location of Sarot in the Castries District of Saint Lucia
- Coordinates: 13°56′38″N 60°59′13″W
- Country: Saint Lucia
- District: Castries

Population (2010)
  - Total: 690
- Sarot 2nd-order division of Castries District

Sarot is a town in the Sarot second-order division of the Castries District of the island nation of Saint Lucia. The Sarot division has a population of 690. Sarot is located towards the heart of the island, between Vanard and bexon. Sarot has a quiet rural feel in a tropical environment.

== See also ==
- List of cities in Saint Lucia
- Castries District
