= Index of Saint Lucia–related articles =

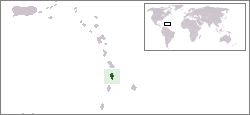
The location of the Saint Lucia

The following is an alphabetical list of topics related to the nation of Saint Lucia.

== 0–9 ==
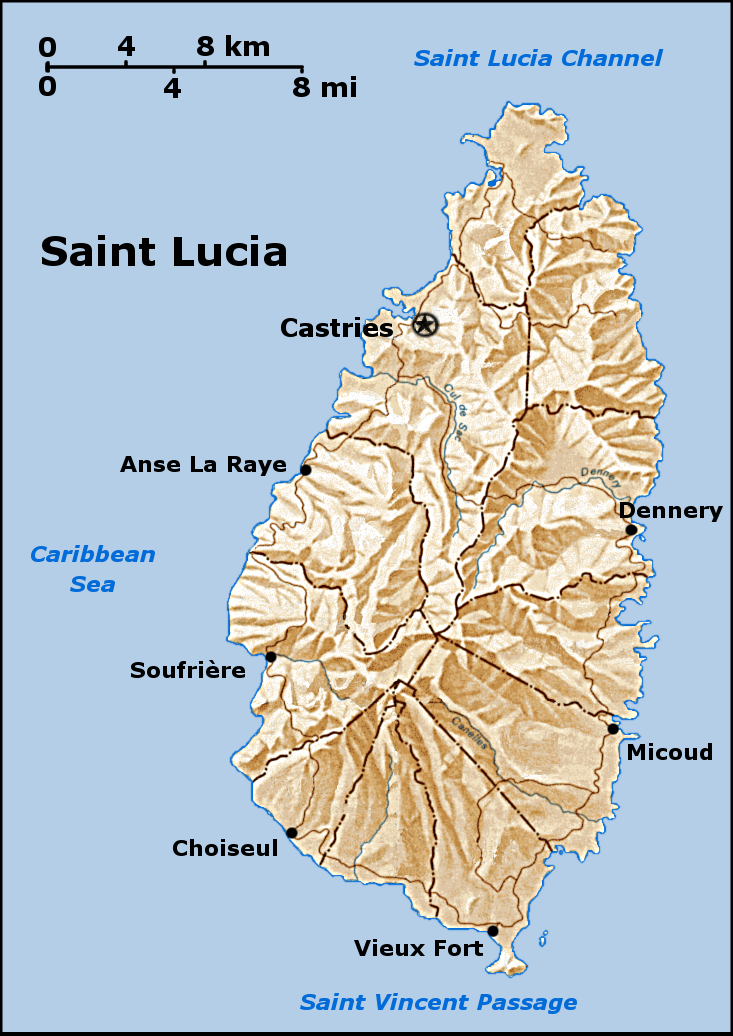
A map of Saint Lucia

- .lc – Internet country code top-level domain for Saint Lucia

== A ==
- Airports in Saint Lucia
- Americas
  - North America
    - North Atlantic Ocean
      - West Indies
        - Caribbean Sea
          - Antilles
            - Lesser Antilles
              - Islands of Saint Lucia
- Anglo-America
- Antilles
- Army of Saint Lucia
- Atlantic Ocean
- Atlas of Saint Lucia

== B ==
- Beaches in Saint Lucia
- Bibliography of Saint Lucia
- Birds of Saint Lucia

== C ==
- Capital of Saint Lucia: Castries
- Caribbean
- Caribbean Community (CARICOM)
- Caribbean Sea
- Castries – Capital of Saint Lucia
- Categories:
  - Category:Saint Lucia
    - Category:Buildings and structures in Saint Lucia
    - Category:Communications in Saint Lucia
    - Category:Culture of Saint Lucia
    - Category:Economy of Saint Lucia
    - Category:Education in Saint Lucia
    - Category:Environment of Saint Lucia
    - Category:Fauna of Saint Lucia
    - Category:Geography of Saint Lucia
    - Category:Government of Saint Lucia
    - Category:History of Saint Lucia
    - Category:Military of Saint Lucia
    - Category:Politics of Saint Lucia
    - Category:Saint Lucia stubs
    - Category:Saint Lucian people
    - Category:Saint Lucia-related lists
    - Category:Society of Saint Lucia
    - Category:Sport in Saint Lucia
    - Category:Transport in Saint Lucia
  - commons:Category:Saint Lucia
- Cities of Saint Lucia
- Climate of Saint Lucia
- Coat of arms of Saint Lucia
- Commonwealth of Nations
- Commonwealth realm of Saint Lucia
- Communications in Saint Lucia
- Companies of Saint Lucia
- Constitution of Saint Lucia
- Culture of Saint Lucia

== D ==
- Demographics of Saint Lucia
- Diplomatic missions in Saint Lucia
- Diplomatic missions of Saint Lucia

== E ==
- Economy of Saint Lucia
- Education in Saint Lucia
- Elections in Saint Lucia
- English colonization of the Americas
- English language

== F ==
The Flag of Saint Lucia

- Flag of Saint Lucia
- Foreign relations of Saint Lucia

== G ==
- Geography of Saint Lucia
- Government of Saint Lucia
- Governors-General of Saint Lucia
- Gross domestic product

== H ==
- Health in Saint Lucia
- Healthcare in Saint Lucia
- Hinduism in Saint Lucia
- History of Saint Lucia
- Hospitals in Saint Lucia

== I ==
- International Organization for Standardization (ISO)
  - ISO 3166-1 alpha-2 country code for Saint Lucia: LC
  - ISO 3166-1 alpha-3 country code for Saint Lucia: LCA
- Internet in Saint Lucia
- Islands of Saint Lucia:
  - Saint Lucia island
  - Bateaux Island
  - Bouche Island
  - Choc Island
  - Dennery Island
  - Des Bateaux Island
  - Fourer Island
  - Fous Island
  - Fregate Island (Saint Lucia)
  - Gros Island
  - Lapins Island
  - Maria Islands
  - Pigeon Island (Saint Lucia)
  - Praslin Island (Saint Lucia)
  - Rat Island (Saint Lucia)
  - Rouche Island
  - Scorpion Island (Saint Lucia)

== L ==
- Law enforcement in Saint Lucia
- Lesser Antilles
- LGBT rights in Saint Lucia (Gay rights)
- Lists related to Saint Lucia:
  - List of airports in Saint Lucia
  - List of birds of Saint Lucia
  - List of cities in Saint Lucia
  - List of islands of Saint Lucia
  - List of mountains of Saint Lucia
  - List of rivers of Saint Lucia
  - List of volcanoes in Saint Lucia
  - List of countries by GDP (nominal)
  - List of Saint Lucians
  - List of political parties in Saint Lucia
  - Diplomatic missions of Saint Lucia
  - List of diplomatic missions in Saint Lucia
  - List of governors-general of Saint Lucia
  - List of companies of Saint Lucia
  - List of Saint Lucia-related topics
  - List of World Heritage Sites in Saint Lucia
  - Topic outline of Saint Lucia

== M ==
- Military of Saint Lucia
- Monarchy of Saint Lucia
- Mountains of Saint Lucia
- Music of Saint Lucia

== N ==
- National Emergency Management Organisation (NEMO)
- North America
- North Atlantic
- Northern Hemisphere

== O ==
- Organisation of Eastern Caribbean States (OECS)

== P ==
- Parliament of Saint Lucia
- People of Saint Lucia
- Political parties in Saint Lucia
- Politics of Saint Lucia
- Prime Minister of Saint Lucia

== R ==
- Religion in Saint Lucia
- Rivers of Saint Lucia

== S ==
- Saint Lucia
- Saint Lucia Giant Rice-rat
- Saint Lucia at the Olympics
- The Saint Lucia Scout Association
- Saint Lucia Solid Waste Management Authority (SLUSWMA)
- Saint Lucian diplomatic missions
- Scouting in Saint Lucia
- Senate of Saint Lucia
- Soufrière River
- Sports in Saint Lucia
- States headed by Elizabeth II

== T ==
- Topic outline of Saint Lucia
- Tourism in Saint Lucia
- Transport in Saint Lucia

== U ==
- United Nations, member state since 1979
- United States-Saint Lucia relations

== V ==
- Visa free travel from Saint Lucia
- Volcanoes of Saint Lucia

== W ==
- Western Hemisphere
- Wikimedia Atlas of Saint Lucia
- Wikipedia:WikiProject Topic outline/Drafts/Topic outline of Saint Lucia
- Windward Islands
- World Heritage Sites in Saint Lucia

== See also ==
- Commonwealth of Nations
- List of Caribbean-related topics
- List of international rankings
- Lists of country-related topics
- Topic outline of geography
- Topic outline of North America
- Topic outline of Saint Lucia
- United Nations
