= Outline of Saint Lucia =

Overview of and topical guide to Saint Lucia

The Flag of Saint Lucia

The Coat of arms of Saint Lucia

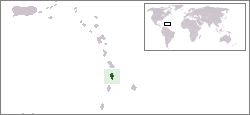
The location of Saint Lucia

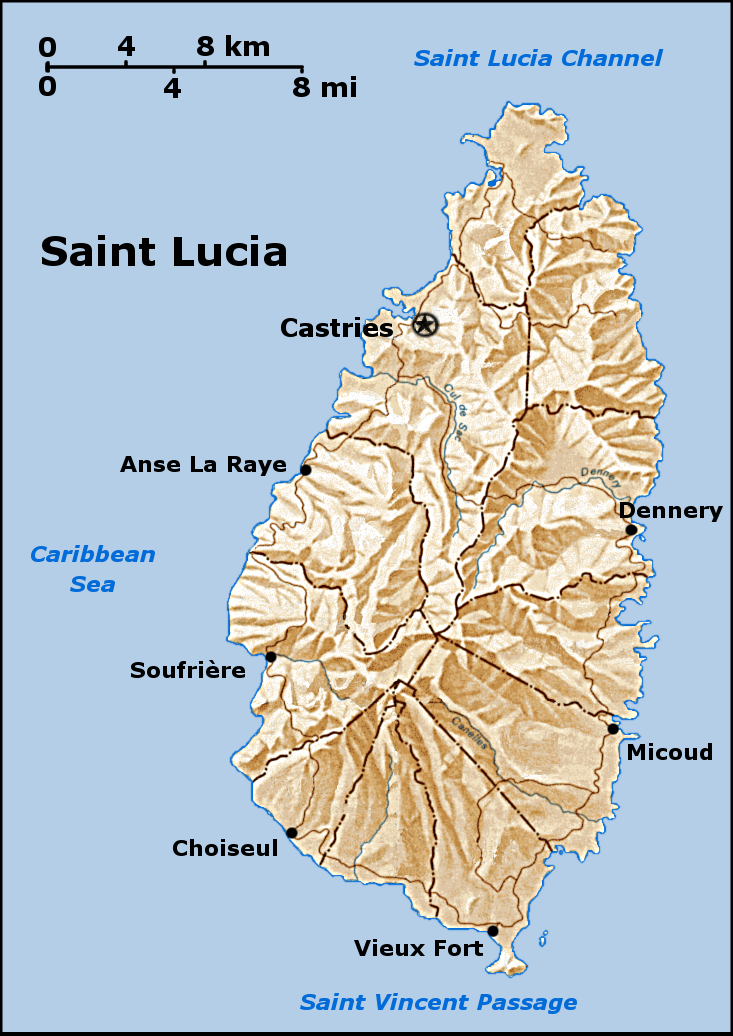
An enlargeable relief map of Saint Lucia

The following outline is provided as an overview of and topical guide to Saint Lucia:

Saint Lucia is a sovereign island nation located in the Lesser Antilles archipelago in the eastern Caribbean Sea adjacent to the North Atlantic Ocean. Saint Lucia is located north of the islands of Saint Vincent and the Grenadines, northwest of Barbados and south of Martinique. It is also known as the "Helen of the West Indies" because it switched between British and French control so often it was likened to the mythical Helen of Troy.

Saint Lucia is one of the Windward Islands, named for Saint Lucy of Syracuse. It was first visited by Europeans in about the year 1500 and first colonized successfully by France who signed a treaty with the native Carib peoples in 1660. Great Britain took control of the island from 1663 to 1667 then went to war with France over it fourteen times, and finally took complete control in 1814. Representative government came about in 1924 (with universal adult suffrage from 1953) and from 1958 to 1962 the island was a member of the Federation of the West Indies. Finally, on February 22, 1979, Saint Lucia became an independent state of the Commonwealth of Nations. The island nation celebrates this every year with a public holiday.

== General reference ==
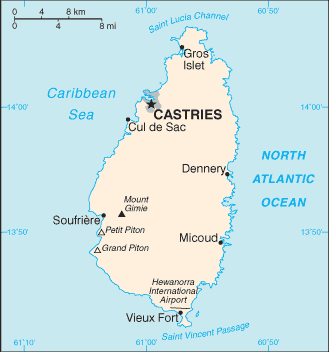
An enlargeable basic map of Saint Lucia

- Pronunciation:
- Common English country name: Saint Lucia
- Official English country name: Saint Lucia
- Common endonym(s):
- Official endonym(s):
- Adjectival(s):
- Demonym(s):
- Etymology: Name of Saint Lucia
- ISO country codes: LC, LCA, 662
- ISO region codes: See ISO 3166-2:LC
- Internet country code top-level domain: .lc

== Geography of Saint Lucia ==
Geography of Saint Lucia

- Saint Lucia is...
  - an island
  - a country
    - an island country
    - a nation state
    - a Commonwealth realm
- Location:
  - Northern Hemisphere and Western Hemisphere
    - North America (though not on the mainland)
  - Atlantic Ocean
    - North Atlantic
      - Caribbean
        - Antilles
          - Lesser Antilles
            - Windward Islands
  - Time zone: Eastern Caribbean Time (UTC-04)
  - Extreme points of Saint Lucia
    - High: Mount Gimie 950 m (3,117 ft)
    - Low: Caribbean Sea 0 m
  - Land boundaries: none
  - Coastline: 158 km
- Population of Saint Lucia: 165,000 - 180th most populous country
- Area of Saint Lucia: 620 km^{2}
- Atlas of Saint Lucia

=== Environment of Saint Lucia ===
- Climate of Saint Lucia
- Renewable energy in Saint Lucia
- Geology of Saint Lucia
- Protected areas of Saint Lucia
  - Biosphere reserves in Saint Lucia
  - National parks of Saint Lucia
- Wildlife of Saint Lucia
  - Fauna of Saint Lucia
    - Birds of Saint Lucia
    - Mammals of Saint Lucia

==== Natural geographic features of Saint Lucia ====
- Fjords of Saint Lucia
- Glaciers of Saint Lucia
- Islands of Saint Lucia
- Lakes of Saint Lucia
- Mountains of Saint Lucia
  - Volcanoes in Saint Lucia
- Rivers of Saint Lucia
  - Waterfalls of Saint Lucia
- Valleys of Saint Lucia
- World Heritage Sites in Saint Lucia

=== Regions of Saint Lucia ===
Districts of Saint Lucia (first order)

- Cities in Saint Lucia

==== Ecoregions of Saint Lucia ====
List of ecoregions in Saint Lucia

- Ecoregions in Saint Lucia

=== Demography of Saint Lucia ===
Demographics of Saint Lucia

== Government and politics of Saint Lucia ==
Politics of Saint Lucia

- Form of government:
- Capital of Saint Lucia: Castries
- Elections in Saint Lucia
- Political parties in Saint Lucia

=== Branches of the government of Saint Lucia ===
Government of Saint Lucia

==== Executive branch of the government of Saint Lucia ====
- Head of state: Monarch of Saint Lucia,
- Head of government: Prime Minister of Saint Lucia,
- Cabinet of Saint Lucia

==== Legislative branch of the government of Saint Lucia ====
- Parliament of Saint Lucia (bicameral)
  - Upper house: Senate of Saint Lucia
  - Lower house: House of Commons of Saint Lucia

==== Judicial branch of the government of Saint Lucia ====
Court system of Saint Lucia

- Supreme Court of Saint Lucia

=== Foreign relations of Saint Lucia ===
Foreign relations of Saint Lucia

- Diplomatic missions in Saint Lucia
- Diplomatic missions of Saint Lucia

==== International organization membership ====
Saint Lucia is a member of:

- African, Caribbean, and Pacific Group of States (ACP)
- Agency for the Prohibition of Nuclear Weapons in Latin America and the Caribbean (OPANAL)
- Caribbean Community and Common Market (Caricom)
- Caribbean Development Bank (CDB)
- Commonwealth of Nations
- Food and Agriculture Organization (FAO)
- Group of 77 (G77)
- International Bank for Reconstruction and Development (IBRD)
- International Civil Aviation Organization (ICAO)
- International Criminal Court (ICCt) (signatory)
- International Criminal Police Organization (Interpol)
- International Development Association (IDA)
- International Federation of Red Cross and Red Crescent Societies (IFRCS)
- International Finance Corporation (IFC)
- International Fund for Agricultural Development (IFAD)
- International Labour Organization (ILO)
- International Maritime Organization (IMO)
- International Monetary Fund (IMF)
- International Olympic Committee (IOC)
- International Organization for Standardization (ISO)
- International Red Cross and Red Crescent Movement (ICRM)
- International Telecommunication Union (ITU)
- International Trade Union Confederation (ITUC)
- Multilateral Investment Guarantee Agency (MIGA)
- Nonaligned Movement (NAM)
- Organisation internationale de la Francophonie (OIF)
- Organisation for the Prohibition of Chemical Weapons (OPCW)
- Organization of American States (OAS)
- Organization of Eastern Caribbean States (OECS)
- United Nations (UN)
- United Nations Conference on Trade and Development (UNCTAD)
- United Nations Educational, Scientific, and Cultural Organization (UNESCO)
- United Nations Industrial Development Organization (UNIDO)
- Universal Postal Union (UPU)
- World Confederation of Labour (WCL)
- World Customs Organization (WCO)
- World Federation of Trade Unions (WFTU)
- World Health Organization (WHO)
- World Intellectual Property Organization (WIPO)
- World Meteorological Organization (WMO)
- World Trade Organization (WTO)

=== Law and order in Saint Lucia ===
Law of Saint Lucia

- Constitution of Saint Lucia
- Crime in Saint Lucia
- Human rights in Saint Lucia
  - LGBT rights in Saint Lucia
  - Freedom of religion in Saint Lucia
- Law enforcement in Saint Lucia

=== Military of Saint Lucia ===
Military of Saint Lucia

- Command
  - Commander-in-chief:
    - Ministry of Defence of Saint Lucia
- Forces
  - Army of Saint Lucia
  - Navy of Saint Lucia
  - Air Force of Saint Lucia
  - Special forces of Saint Lucia
- Military history of Saint Lucia
- Military ranks of Saint Lucia

=== Local government in Saint Lucia ===
Local government in Saint Lucia

== History of Saint Lucia ==
History of Saint Lucia

- Timeline of the history of Saint Lucia
- Current events of Saint Lucia
- Military history of Saint Lucia

== Culture of Saint Lucia ==
Culture of Saint Lucia

- Architecture of Saint Lucia
- Cuisine of Saint Lucia
- Festivals in Saint Lucia
- Languages of Saint Lucia
- Media in Saint Lucia
- National symbols of Saint Lucia
  - Coat of arms of Saint Lucia
  - Flag of Saint Lucia
  - National anthem of Saint Lucia
- People of Saint Lucia
- Public holidays in Saint Lucia
- Records of Saint Lucia
- Religion in Saint Lucia
  - Christianity in Saint Lucia
  - Hinduism in Saint Lucia
  - Islam in Saint Lucia
  - Judaism in Saint Lucia
  - Sikhism in Saint Lucia
- World Heritage Sites in Saint Lucia

=== Art in Saint Lucia ===
- Art in Saint Lucia
- Cinema of Saint Lucia
- Literature of Saint Lucia
- Music of Saint Lucia
- Television in Saint Lucia
- Theatre in Saint Lucia

=== Sports in Saint Lucia ===
Sports in Saint Lucia

- Football in Saint Lucia
- Saint Lucia at the Olympics

== Economy and infrastructure of Saint Lucia ==
Economy of Saint Lucia

- Economic rank, by nominal GDP (2007): 169th (one hundred and sixty ninth)
- Agriculture in Saint Lucia
- Banking in Saint Lucia
  - National Bank of Saint Lucia
- Communications in Saint Lucia
  - Internet in Saint Lucia
- Companies of Saint Lucia
- Currency of Saint Lucia: Dollar
  - ISO 4217: XCD
- Energy in Saint Lucia
  - Energy policy of Saint Lucia
  - Oil industry in Saint Lucia
- Mining in Saint Lucia
- Tourism in Saint Lucia
- Transport in Saint Lucia
- Saint Lucia Stock Exchange

== Education in Saint Lucia ==
Education in Saint Lucia

== Infrastructure of Saint Lucia ==
- Health care in Saint Lucia
- Transportation in Saint Lucia
  - Airports in Saint Lucia
  - Rail transport in Saint Lucia
  - Roads in Saint Lucia
- Water supply and sanitation in Saint Lucia

== See also ==
Saint Lucia

- Index of Saint Lucia-related articles
- List of international rankings
- List of Saint Lucia-related topics
- Member state of the Commonwealth of Nations
- Member state of the United Nations
- Monarchy of Saint Lucia
- Outline of geography
- Outline of North America
- Outline of the Caribbean
