= Scouting and Guiding in Saint Lucia =

Scouting and Guiding movement in Saint Lucia

The Scout and Guide movement in Saint Lucia is served by two organisations:

- Girl Guides Association of Saint Lucia, member of the World Association of Girl Guides and Girl Scouts
- The Saint Lucia Scout Association, member of the World Organization of the Scout Movement
