= Bibliography of Saint Lucia =

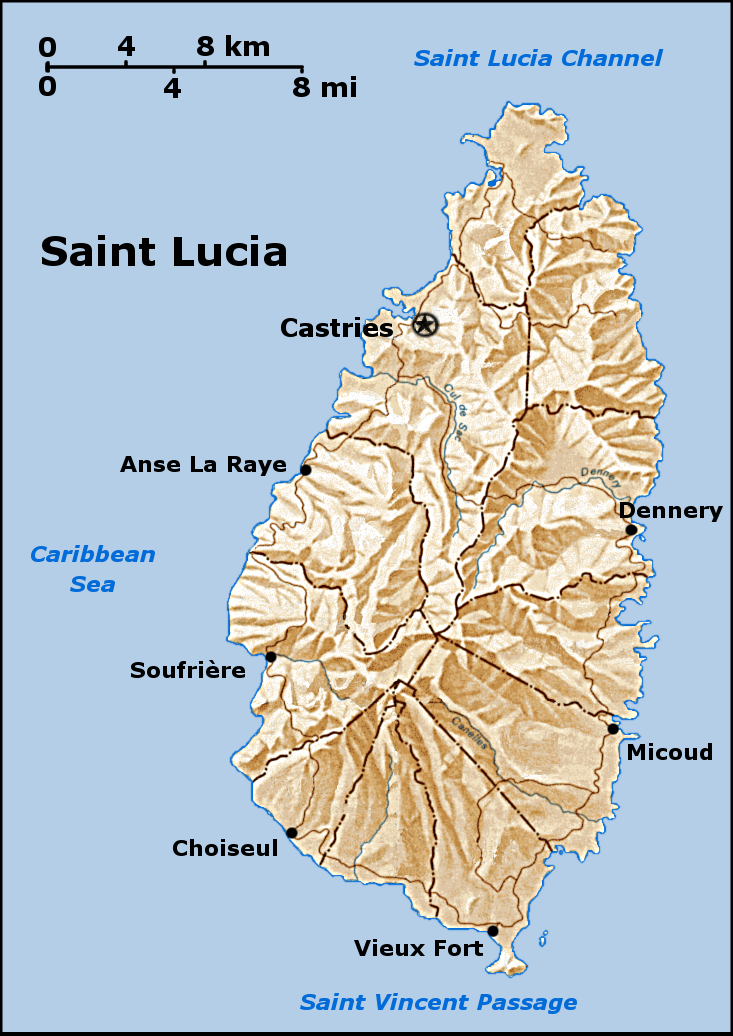

This bibliography of Saint Lucia is a list of English-language nonfiction books which have been described by reliable sources as in some way directly relating to the subject of Saint Lucia, its history, geography, people, culture, etc.

== Culture ==
- Anthony, A. B. Patrick (1986). "Folk Research and Development: The Institutional Background to the Folk Research Center, St. Lucia". In Manfred Kremser; Karl R. Wernhart (eds.). Research in Ethnography and Ethnohistory of St. Lucia. Vienna: Ferdinand Berger and Söhne. pp. 37–56. ISBN 3-85028-188-4.
- Campbell, David (1997). "Musical Traditions of St Lucia". Musical Traditions.
- Frederick, June (November 16, 2020). Traditional Masquerade of Saint Lucia: Characters and Costumes * Music and Dances * Chants and Rituals. Cas. ISBN 978-1953747020.
- Guilbault, Jocelyne (1984). Musical Events in the Lives of the People of St. Lucia (PhD thesis). University of Michigan.
- St Lucia Hotel & Tourism Association. "15 Years of Jazz". Saint Lucia Tourist Guide.
- 1979 Demographic Yearbook, 31st Edition (PDF). New York: United Nations. 1980.
- "City Population – Districts of Saint Lucia". City Population.
- "National Report on Arts Education in St Lucia". August 26, 2005.
- "Sweet Sounds of St. Lucia". Sounds of St. Lucia.

== Geography ==
- "All About St. Lucia". All About St. Lucia.
- "CIA World Factbook – St Lucia". U.S. Central Intelligence Agency. Archived from the original on January 11, 2021.
- Higgins, Chris (2001). St. Lucia. Montreal: Ulysses Travel Guides. ISBN 2-89464-396-9.
- "Saint Lucia". Encyclopedia.
- Geopolitical Data Elements and Related Features. U.S. Department of Defense, Defense Intelligence Agency. September 29, 1972.
- "Saint Lucia Government Statistics Department". Government of Saint Lucia.
- "Statoids – Districts of Saint Lucia". Statoids.

== History ==
- Breen, Henry H (1844). St Lucia Historical Statistical and Descriptive. London.
- Crouse, Nellis M. (1940). French Pioneers in the West Indies 1624-1664. New York, New York: Columbia University Press. ISBN 978-0-374-91937-5.
- Dalphinis, Morgan (September 9, 2019). History and Language in St Lucia 1654-1915. lulu.com. ISBN 978-0244511661.
- French, A. L. Dawn (September 19, 2000). Saint Lucia: Up To Now. independently published. ISBN 979-8688098471.
- Harmsen, Jolien; Ellis, Guy; Devaux, Robert (2014). A History of St Lucia. Vieux Fort: Lighthouse Road. ISBN 9789769534001.
- Honychurch, Lennox (1995). The Dominica Story: A History of the Island (3rd ed.). London: Macmillan Publishers. ISBN 0-333-62776-8.
- Hubbard, Vincent (2002). A History of St. Kitts. Macmillan Caribbean. p. 117. ISBN 9780333747605.
- Hyacinth-Gideon, C. (July 30, 2014). Saint Lucia. AuthorHouseUK. ISBN 978-1496984838.
- Molloy, Linda; Patrick, John (February 1, 1996). Saint Lucia Past, a Pictorial History. Linda Molloy Publishing. ISBN 0952763206.
- Morse, Jedidiah (1797). "St. Lucia". The American Gazetteer. Boston, Massachusetts: At the presses of S. Hall, and Thomas & Andrews. OL 23272543M.
- Peytraud, Lucien Pierre (1897). L'esclavage aux Antilles françaises avant 1789 [Slavery in the French West Indies before 1789] (in French). Paris: Librairie Hachette. p. 10. OCLC 503705838.
- Philpott, Don (1999). St Lucia. Derbyshire: Landmark Publishing Ltd. ISBN 1-901522-28-8.
- Roulet, Éric (2014). "«Mousquets, piques et canons…». La défense des Antilles françaises au temps de la Compagnie des îles (1626–1648) ['Muskets, Pikes and Cannons…': The Defense of the French Antilles in the Days of the Compagnie des Îles (1626–1648)]". In Plouviez, David (ed.). Défense et colonies dans le mode atlantique: XVe-XXe siècle [The Atlantic Style of Defense and Colonies: XV-XX Centuries] (in French). Rennes, France: Presses Universitaires de Rennes. pp. 201–217. ISBN 978-2-7535-6422-0.
- Servant, Georges (1914). Les compagnies de Saint-Christophe et des îles de l'Amérique (1626-1653) [The Companies of Saint-Christophe and the Islands of America (1626–1653)] (in French). Paris: Édouard Champion for the Société de l’Histoire des Colonies françaises. OCLC 461616576.
- "History of Saint Lucia". Permanent Mission of St. Lucia to the United Nations. Archived from the original on August 2, 2005.
- "History of Saint Lucia". Permanent Mission of St. Lucia to the United Nations. Archived from the original on 2013-07-09.
- "History and Culture". Saint Lucia Tourism Office.

== Politics ==
- French, A.L. Dawn (November 17, 2014). Profile: Cabinet Secretaries of Saint Lucia. CreateSpace Independent Publishing Platform. ISBN 978-1503253414.
- Reynolds, Anderson (January 18, 2021). No Man's Land: A Political Introspection of St. Lucia. Jako Books. ISBN 978-1733291323.
- "Government of Saint Lucia". Official Government of Saint Lucia.
- "House of Assembly". Government of Saint Lucia.
- "Saint Lucia's Constitution of 1978" (PDF). Constitutions Project. 1978.
- "The Saint Lucia Constitution, revised December 31, 2006". Government of Saint Lucia. 2006.
- "Commonwealth Caribbean Law Research Guide: St. Lucia". Florida State University College of Law.
