= Victoria Hospital (Saint Lucia) =

Hospital in Castries, Saint Lucia

Geography
- Location: Castries, Saint Lucia
- Coordinates: 14°0′36″N 60°59′55″W

History
- Opened: 1887

Links
- Lists: Hospitals in Saint Lucia

Victoria Hospital is a public health care facility in Saint Lucia. It is located in Castries. The hospital opened in 1887.

It was once the main hospital of the island but has since been replaced by the Owen King European Union Hospital (OKEU)
