= Religion in Saint Lucia =

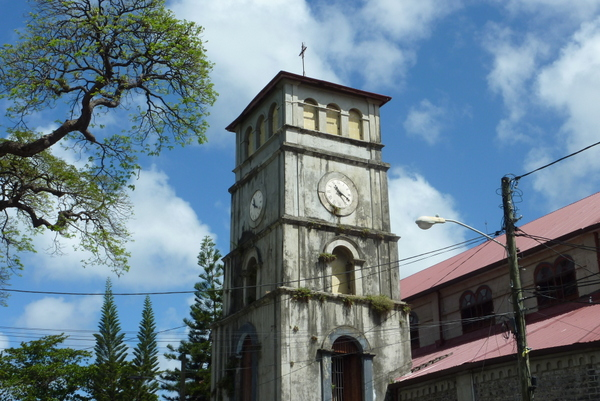
Cathedral Basilica of the Immaculate Conception in Castries

Christianity is the majority faith in Saint Lucia, with the Roman Catholic Church having the largest following. Other Christian denominations like Seventh-Day Adventists and Pentecostals form significant minority. The country is named after the Saint Lucy of Syracuse (AD 283 – 304). It is also believed that the French sailors were shipwrecked on the island on 13 December, the feast day of St. Lucy, and therefore named the island in her honour. The same day is celebrated as National Day.

Religion in Saint Lucia (2022 Census)
1. Roman Catholicism (50.6%)
2. Seventh-day Adventism (10.8%)
3. Pentecostalism (9.00%)
4. Other Christians (5.60%)
5. Rastafari (1.40%)
6. Other religions (incl. Hinduism, Islam, Baháʼí Faith, etc.) (2.60%)
7. None (14.1%)
8. Not stated (4.10%)

== Demographics ==
Roman Catholicism remains the dominant faith in St.Lucia, but its share of the population declined from 92.4% in 1960 to 50.6% in 2022. This change reflects the growing influence of various Protestant denominations, particularly the Seventh-day Adventist and Pentecostal churches, which saw steady increases during this period. The Pentecostal community, for instance, grew from virtually no recorded presence in 1960 to 9.0% in 2022, while Seventh-day Adventists rose from 1.8% to 10.8%. There has also been a notable rise in individuals reporting no religious affiliation, from less than 1% in 1980 to 14.1% in 2022, indicating a gradual trend toward secularism.

Additionally, smaller religious groups such as Rastafarians, Hindus, Muslims, and Baháʼís have established a modest presence, contributing to the island’s increasing religious diversity.

Religious Affiliation in Saint Lucia (1960–2022)
Religion	1960	1970	1980	1991	2001	2010	2022
Roman Catholic	92.4	90.5	85.6	79.0	67.5	61.1	50.6
Anglican	3.8	3.4	2.7	2.5	2.0	1.6	1.3
Baptist	0.3	1.1	1.4	1.6	1.9	2.1	1.7
Methodist	0.9	0.8	0.8	0.6	0.5	0.5	0.4
Pentecostal	0.0	0.5	1.3	3.0	5.6	8.8	9.0
Seventh-day Adventist	1.8	2.4	4.3	6.5	8.4	10.4	10.8
Church of God	0.0	0.2	0.7	1.0	1.4	1.5	—
Evangelical	—	—	—	—	2.0	2.2	—
Rastafarian	0.0	0.0	0.0	0.6	2.1	1.9	1.4
Jehovah's Witnesses	0.0	0.0	0.0	0.8	1.1	1.1	0.8
Hindu	0.0	0.0	0.0	0.1	0.2	0.3	0.19
Muslim	0.0	0.0	0.0	0.1	0.2	0.1	0.17
Baháʼí Faith	—	—	—	—	0.1	0.1	0.02
Salvation Army	0.0	0.0	0.0	0.1	0.1	0.2	0.12
Other	0.0	0.0	1.1	2.0	0.8	0.1	2.2
None	0.0	0.0	0.7	1.3	4.5	5.9	14.1
Not Stated / Not Reported	0.8	1.1	1.4	0.7	1.5	1.9	4.1

== Religious Freedom ==
Saint Lucia's constitution guarantees freedom of religion, allowing individuals to practice their faith without interference. There is no state religion, and the law requires religious groups with more than 250 members to register with the government.

== See also ==
- Demographics of Saint Lucia
- Catholic Church in Saint Lucia
- Islam in Saint Lucia
