= Health in Saint Lucia =

Total expenditure on health in Saint Lucia was 6.72% of the GDP in 2014. Health expenditure was at US$302 per capita in 2004. Infant mortality was at 12 per 100,000 births in 2005.

Life expectancy in Saint Lucia at birth was estimated at 75.2 years for men in 2017 and 80.8 for women.

== Healthcare ==
There is a National Health Scheme but not everybody is covered. Government expenditure is about 66.5% of total health spending. The World Bank agreed a US$ 20 Million credit from the International Development Association in September 2018 to strengthen the country's health system.

The St. Lucia Medical and Dental Association issued a statement in May 2018 that deplorable conditions on the island were “leading to unwarranted suffering and deaths” claiming the government were fixated upon privatizing health services. They were supported by the Vieux-Fort Concerned Citizens Coalition for Change.

=== Hospitals ===
- Victoria Hospital (Saint Lucia) was previously the island's main hospital. It is currently used as a respiratory hospital due to Covid-19.
- National Mental Wellness Centre is a psychiatric hospital in Castries.
- St. Jude Hospital in Vieux Fort was a Charity Hospital opened in September 1966 by the Sisters of the Sorrowful Mother. Since 2003 it has been run by a board of directors appointed by the Minister of Health. It burned down in 2009 and was evacuated to the George Odlum Stadium where it operates under the stands. It is currently being rebuilt and is 70% complete. Staff there are said to be unhappy and some have joined the National Workers' Union (Saint Lucia).
- Tapion Hospital is a commercial hospital with 32 beds, 2 fully equipped operating rooms and a delivery suite. It has the only CT Scanner on the island.
- Dennery Hospital was destroyed by Hurricane Tomas in 2010 but was rebuilt and reopened in 2014.
- Owen King European Union Hospital is said to be the European Union’s most expensive project in the Caribbean. They contributed €40 million. Construction began in 2009. In 2018 only the Dialysis Unit, with eleven dialysis machines, was in use. It is now fully in use and is the main hospital of the island.

== Mental health ==
The National Mental Wellness Centre is a psychiatric hospital in Coubaril, commissioned on 1 March 2010. Initially constructed by China it was completed by the Taiwanese Government.
