= Telecommunications in Saint Lucia =

Telecommunications in Saint Lucia include internet, radio, television, and mobile and landline phones.

== Internet ==
Saint Lucia's country code top-level domain is .lc. Prior to the 21st century internet was available only by satellite. As of 2000, there were 5 Internet service providers serving the country. 90% of the city population has an internet connection but rural villages are only rarely connected. An average internet contract costs $42.99 per month.

== Telephone ==
As of 2008, approximately 90,000 landlines and 100,000 mobile cellular lines were in use.

Also as of 2008, the telephone system consisted of two parts:

- Domestic: System is automatically switched.
- International: Submarine fibre optic link with Martinique (France), Saint Vincent and the Grenadines and Barbados.

Saint Lucia is part of the North American Numbering Plan with area code 758. although the original area code 809 numbers may still be used. Under the 809 area code, in 2020 there were a total of 241,000 phone connections with 203,000 of them being mobile connections.

== Radio ==
Radio broadcasts in St. Lucia were initially provided by the Windward Islands Broadcasting Service (WIBS) during 1954–1972. The locally established Radio Caribbean International has served the island since 1961, while the government-owned Radio St. Lucia broadcast from 1972 until 2017.

- Radio broadcast stations: AM 2, FM 7 (plus 3 repeaters), shortwave 0 (1998), includes VQH-AM 660
- Radios: 111,000 (1997)

== Television ==
Launched in 1966, the privately owned Saint Lucia Television Station (SLTV) was the first service of its kind in the country; it relayed programming from the Caribbean Broadcasting Corporation (CBC) of Barbados. In 1981, it was succeeded by the Helen Television Service (HTS), whose schedule consisted of American content sourced from satellite.

- Television broadcast stations: 3 (of which two are commercial stations and one is a community antenna television or CATV channel) (1997)
- Televisions: 100,000 (2005)
