= Manfred Kremser =

- Born: 30 July 1950; Wiener Neustadt, Austria
- Died: 3 March 2013 (aged 62); Wiesen, Austria
- Occupations: Ethnologist and researcher

Manfred Kremser (30 July 1950 – 3 March 2013) was an Austrian ethnologist and researcher of the human consciousness.

== Life ==
Kremser was born in Wiener Neustadt. He taught at the Department of Cultural and Social Anthropology at the University of Vienna. Until his death he was President of the Austrian Association for parapsychology. He has been president of the Austrian ethnomedical society and Chairman of the Association of Intercultural Work.

Since 1972, he has done ethnographic field research with in Africa, India with Bhil people, in the Caribbean Region and in the cyberspace. He has done also field research in St.Lucia Kélé in the context of African-derived religious traditions in the Caribbean. Kremser’s research focused on African religions in Africa, Azande and Bambara people, and the African diaspora. He has worked for decades with the Folk Research Centre on documenting the Kélé religion in the Fond Assau area.

He specialized on ethnological research in human consciousness, shamanic sciences, therapeutic rituals, esthetics of cures with rituals, trance technologies, binary oracle systems, symbolism of water, water rituals and cyber anthropology.

His recent projects dealt with traditional and globalized knowledge about cures in the Pannonian spa area. He was the author of more than 80 papers, and editor of the ethnomedical health guidebook: “Selbstheilungskräfte: Die Quelle zur Stärkung und Heilung im eigenen Ich”. (Self healing capacities: The origin for strength and the cure of the Self.).

He died in Wiesen, Austria on March 3, 2013.

== Selected publications ==
- „Karibische Genesis II: Spirituelle Arbeit und rituelle Inszenierung“, in Hermann Mückler, Werner Zips & Manfred Kremser (Hg.), Ethnohistorie: Empirie und Praxis (Wiener Beiträge zur Ethnologie und Anthropologie 14). Wien: WUV, 2006
- „Afroamerikanische Religionen in der Karibik“, in Bernd Hausberger & Gerhard Pfeisinger (Hg.), Die Karibik: Geschichte und Gesellschaft 1492–2000 (Edition Weltregionen 11). Wien: ProMedia, 2005
- „Das schamanische Gesamtkunstwerk“, in Verein Pacha Mama: Maresa Pirker et al. (Hg.), Gesundheit und Spiritualität (Dokumentation des Kongresses vom 23.–26. Juni 2005). Wien: pro literatur Verlag Robert Mayer-Scholz, 2005
- Ethnohistorie: Empirie und Praxis (Wiener Beiträge zur Ethnologie und Anthropologie 14). Wien: WUV, 2006
