= Saint Lucia National Emergency Management Organisation =

Disaster management organisation in Saint Lucia

Saint Lucia's National Emergency Management Organisation (NEMO) is responsible for disaster preparedness and disaster response co-ordination.

== History ==
Disaster Management, though called by numerous names over the years, has manifested itself constantly in Saint Lucia. As far back as June 10 – 20, 1979 Saint Lucia was host to the Caribbean Disaster Preparedness Seminar, where over one hundred and fifty delegates from the Caribbean, North and Latin America assembled to discuss the concerns of the day. The following year Hurricane Allen hit Saint Lucia.

A year later in 1991 Saint Lucia, together with fifteen other Caribbean States signed the Articles that created the Caribbean Disaster Emergency Response Agency (CDERA) Disaster Management in Saint Lucia is conducted on a voluntary basis and during an event NEMO is part of a larger network that comes into existence to respond to a disaster. There are various Ministries that are essential to a response action. There are also eighteen (18) District Committees that are composed similarly to the national committees, which are composed of representatives of various Ministries and Social Groups. For a response action the national personnel contact his/her local counterpart and together execute an action.

== Statutory Authority ==
- Emergency Powers Act 5 of 1995

Provided NEMO with the power to commandeer resources during a state of emergency.

- Disaster Preparedness and Response Act 13 of 2000

Consolidated and placed in law the actions of NEMO.

- Cabinet Conclusion 1149/96

Authorized the National Emergency Response Plan for Saint Lucia.

- Disaster Management Act No. 30 of 2006

Replaced Disaster Preparedness and Response Act of 2000.

== Mission statement ==
The role of the National Emergency Management Organisation [NEMO] is to develop, test and implement adequate measures to protect the population of Saint Lucia from the physical, social, environmental and economic effects of both natural and man-made disasters.

Its responsibility is to ensure the efficient functioning of preparedness, prevention, mitigation and response actions.

== Disaster Response Plans ==
The National Response Plans for Saint Lucia are all at various levels of approval. Once they have met the full approval process they shall be available to the public. The plans are all “stand alone” documents that may be activated to support hazard management plans. They are inter alia:

- STANDING OPERATING PROCEDURES [SOPs]

1. SOPs: General [Approved 1149/96] 2. SOPs: EOC [Approved 1149/96] 3. SOPs: Declaring a Disaster [Laws of Saint Lucia] 4. SOPs: National Shut Down 5. Telecommunications Procedures [Approved 1149/96] 6. Mass Crowd Events Guidelines

- POLICIES & GUIDELINES

1. A Policy Framework on Disaster Management 2. Donations and Importation of Relief Supplies Policy [Part 1 approved 1149/96] 3. Emergency Shelter Management Policy [Approved 1149/96] 4. Emergency Housing Policy 5. Hazard Mitigation Policy 6. Mass Fatalities Policy 7. Mass Crowd Events Policies and Guidelines 8. Governmental Officers Security Travel Policy 9. Backup Policy 10. National Policy on Ambulance Operations 11. National Incident Management System [NIMS] Policy

- COMMITTEE PLANS

1. Damage Assessment and Needs Analysis Guidelines 2. Damage Assessment and Needs Analysis Plan 3. Crisis Communication Guide 4. Media Plan for Disasters and Emergencies 5. Telecommunications Plan 6. Relief Distribution Plan 7. Shelter Management Program 8. National Plan for Transportation in Disasters 9. Welfare Emergency Management Support Plan 10. Stress Response Team Plan 11. Emergency Action Plan for Agricultural Pests And Diseases 12. Disaster Auxiliary Corps Guidelines 13. Hospitality Industry Crisis Management Plan 14. Model Plan for the District Disaster Committees

- HAZARD SPECIFIC PLANS

1. Hurricane Plan [Approved 1149/96] 2. Earthquake Plan 3. Volcanic Eruption Plan 4. Landslide Plan 5. Oil Spill Contingency Plan 6. Strategy on the Management of Used Oil 7. Hazardous Materials Plan 8. Hazard Mitigation Plan 9. Response Plan for Refugees and Displaced Persons 10. Maritime Search and Rescue Plan 11. Land Search and Rescue Plan 12. Drought Response Plan 13. Flood Response Plan 14. Fire Response Plan

- GOSL PLANS

1. GOSL Continuity of Operations Plan [COOP] 2. The Ministry of Works Plan 3. The Ministry of Health Plan 4. Private Sector Response Plan 5. Borderlais Prison Emergency Plan 6. GFL Charles Airport Emergency Plan 7. Hweanorra International Airport Emergency Plan 8. Seaports Contingency Plan 9. Guidelines for Debris Management in a Disaster 10. Ministries of External Affairs - Guidelines in case of Disasters 11. National Incident Management System [NIMS] Plan

- AGREEMENTS

1. Articles Establishing the Caribbean Disaster Emergency Response Agency [CDERA] 2. St George's Declaration of Principals 3. Tampere Convention on the Provision of Telecommunication Resources for Disaster Mitigation and Relief Operations 4. United Nations Millennium Goals 5. Agreement Between Member States and Associate Members of The Association of Caribbean States for Regional Cooperation on Natural Disasters

- LEGISLATION

1. The National Emergency Powers Act (5/1995) 2. The Disaster Preparedness & Response Act (13/2000)

== PAHO on NEMO ==
In praise of Disaster Management in Saint Lucia, the Pan American Health Organisation (PAHO) has stated the following on its website.

"National Disaster Management is very active and well developed. Saint Lucia has achieved Disaster Management capabilities which other Caribbean countries can follow. Numerous agreements with the private sector, NGO's, Service Organizations, and neighbouring French Departments have been implemented. Health sector mitigation activities have begun and are expected to continue. St. Lucia has all possible disaster plans available and updated thanks to the National Emergency Management Office Saint Lucia
