= Girl Guides Association of Saint Lucia =

- Girl Guides Association of Saint Lucia
- Country: Saint Lucia
- Founded: 1925
- Membership: 2,181
- Patron: Dame Pearlette Louisy
- President: Raymonde Joseph
- Chief Commissioner: Mary Joseph
- Affiliation: World Association of Girl Guides and Girl Scouts
- Website stluciaguides.com

The Girl Guides Association of Saint Lucia is the national Guiding organisation of Saint Lucia. It serves 2,181 members (as of 2003). Founded in 1925, the girls-only organisation became a full member of the World Association of Girl Guides and Girl Scouts in 1984. It is a member organisation of the Caribbean Link for Guiding.

The island is divided into two Divisions, Northern and Southern. Each Division is subdivided into Districts. The Northern Division has four districts. The Southern Division has five districts. Each district has a District Commissioner.

In 2000, the Guides celebrated their 75th anniversary with a five-day hike around the entire island.

== Martha Francis-Biscette ==
Martha Francis Biscette was awarded in 2009 a British Empire Medal, for her contribution to Guiding. She has been involved in Guiding for over thirty years, holding positions such as District Commissioner and Camp Advisor. She also was presented with the Girl Guides Award for most outstanding Commissioner for Highest Performance to Duty in 2002 while serving as a District Commissioner. During the period 2001 to 2003, she managed five units.

== Prevention and Healthy Lifestyles Training Program ==
The Prevention and Healthy Lifestyles Training Program aimed to provide an opportunity for young women to develop and exercise their leadership skills in order to reduce their vulnerability to HIV/AIDS. In October 2008, the scheme started the village of Anse-La-Raye including activities in the Girl Guide unit. A Saint Lucian and a Peace Corps volunteer ran the programme.

Anse-La-Raye Girls Guides created HIV "fact books" to record information, reflections, and lessons learned since the implementation of the programme. The Guides also explored everyday contexts and tracked and assessed their decision-making against the personal goals and achievements they set for themselves. For World Aids Day 2009, they made and posted HIV education and healthy lifestyles posters around the island. They have also hosted teach-ins for their mothers, aunts and grandmothers.

The Anse-La-Raye Girl Guides also shared their posters and conducted HIV education and prevention activities among their peers in Dennery, a nearby fishing village. As a result, the girls in Dennery were inspired and motivated to revive their Girl Guides unit. Dennery Girl Guides have themselves created posters on HIV/AIDS transmission, care and support, as well as HIV "fact books," which were exhibited in the village as a way to raise community HIV/AIDS awareness. The Dennery Girl Guides were also trained as peer educators and have hosted sessions about HIV/AIDS at local schools.

== See also ==
- The Saint Lucia Scout Association
