= Catholic Church in Saint Lucia =

The Catholic Church in St. Lucia is part of the worldwide Catholic Church, under the spiritual leadership of the Pope and the curia in Rome. Catholicism accounted for 92.4% of the population in the 1960 census, but by 2022 its share had declined to 50.6%. It remains the largest religious group in the country, followed by 86,967 people.

The entire country comprises a single diocese, the Archdiocese of Castries. Saint Lucia is a member of the Antilles Episcopal Conference and shares a single apostolic nuncio with the other nations that are part of the episcopal conference.
