= Economy of Saint Lucia =

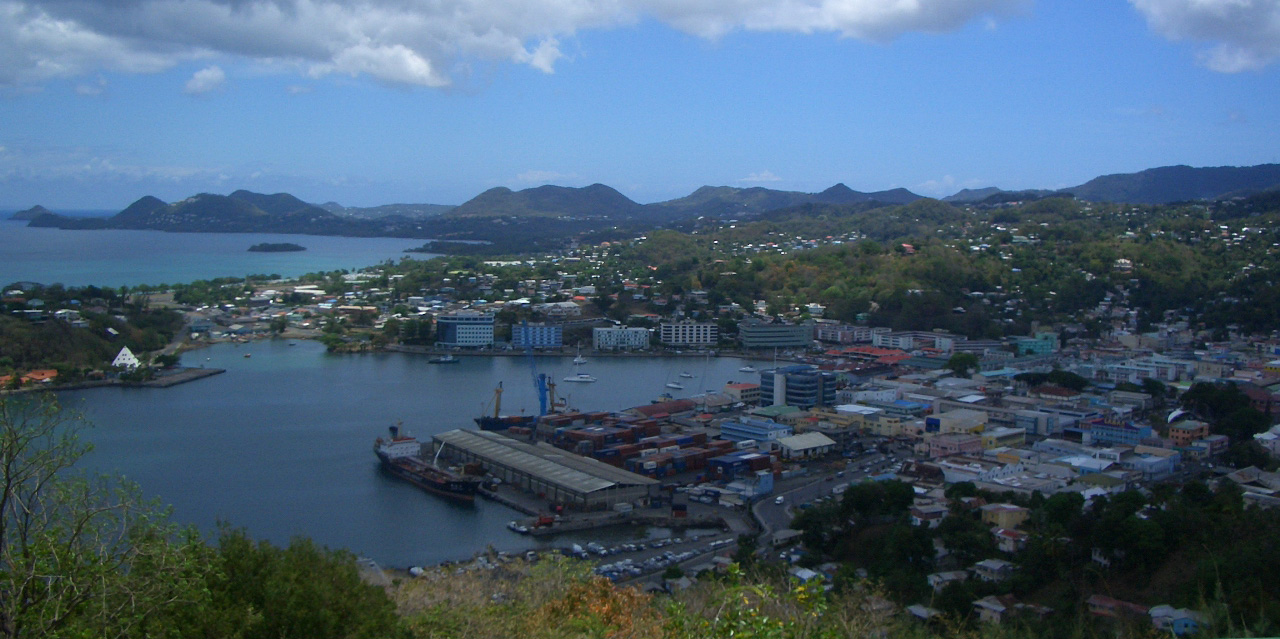
- Castries, the financial center of Saint Lucia
- Currency: East Caribbean dollar (XCD)
- Fiscal year: 1 April–March 31
- Trade organisations: WTO, CARICOM, OECS
- Country group: Developing/Emerging; Upper middle income economy

Statistics
- Population: ▲185,886 (March 2023)
- GDP: ▲$2.262 billion (nominal, 2023 est); ▲$3.399 billion (PPP, 2023 est)
- GDP rank: 186th (nominal, 2023); 182nd (PPP, 2023)
- GDP growth: ▲12.2% (2021); ▲14.9% (2022); ▲3.0% (2023f); ▲2.2% (2024f)
- GDP per capita: ▲$12,264 (nominal, 2023 est.); ▲$18,435 (PPP, 2023 est.)
- GDP per capita rank: 70th (nominal, 2023); 90th (PPP, 2023)
- GDP by sector: agriculture: 2.2%; industry: 10.9%; services: 86.9%; (2020 est.)
- Inflation (CPI): ▲6.4% (2022)
- Population below national poverty line: NA; 20.3% on less than $5.50/day (2016)
- Gini coefficient: 51.2 high (2016)
- Human Development Index: ▼0.715 high (2021) (106th); ▼0.559 medium IHDI (2021)
- Labour force: ▼95,790 (2020); ▲57.4% employment rate (2016)
- Labour force by occupation: agriculture: 7.9%; industry: 15.6%; services: 76.5%; (Apr 2021 est.)
- Unemployment: ▼17.5% (2022); ▼26.2% youth unemployment (2022)
- Main industries: tourism; clothing, assembly of electronic components, beverages, corrugated cardboard boxes, lime processing, coconut processing

External
- Exports: ▼$185.1 million (2017 est.)
- Export goods: crude petroleum, beer, jewelry, bananas, refined petroleum, rum
- Main export partners: United States 17.2%; Guyana 16.3%; Trinidad and Tobago 14.2%; Barbados 8.84%; Suriname 6.84% (2022)
- Imports: ▲$600 million (2017 est.)
- Import goods: crude petroleum, refined petroleum, cars, poultry meats, natural gas
- Main import partners: United States 75.9% (2022)
- Gross external debt: $570.6 million (31 December 2017 est.)

Public finance
- Foreign reserves: ▲$321.8 million (31 December 2017 est.)
- Budget balance: +0.3% (of GDP) (2017 est.)
- Revenue: 398.2 million (2017 est.)
- Spending: 392.8 million (2017 est.)
- All values, unless otherwise stated, are in US dollars.

Once a single-crop agricultural economy, Saint Lucia has shifted to a tourism and banking serviced-based economy. Tourism, the island's biggest industry and main source of jobs, income and foreign exchange, accounts for 65% of its GDP. Agriculture, which was once the biggest industry, now contributes to less than 3% of GDP, but still accounts for 20% of jobs. The banana industry is now on a decline due to strong competition from low-cost Latin American producers and reduced European trade preferences, but the government has helped revitalize the industry, with 13,734 tonnes exported in 2018. Agricultural crops grown for export are bananas, mangoes, and avocados. The island is considered to have the most diverse and well-developed manufacturing industry in the eastern Caribbean.

Saint Lucia has been able to attract many foreign businesses and investors.

== Economic history ==
The island's banana output was heavily impacted in 2007 by Hurricane Dean. In 2006, the governor stated:

While living standards have improved for many, a large number of people have been pushed to the margin of economic activity, especially in the areas which once depended heavily on the banana industry for a livelihood.

== Sectors ==
=== Agriculture ===
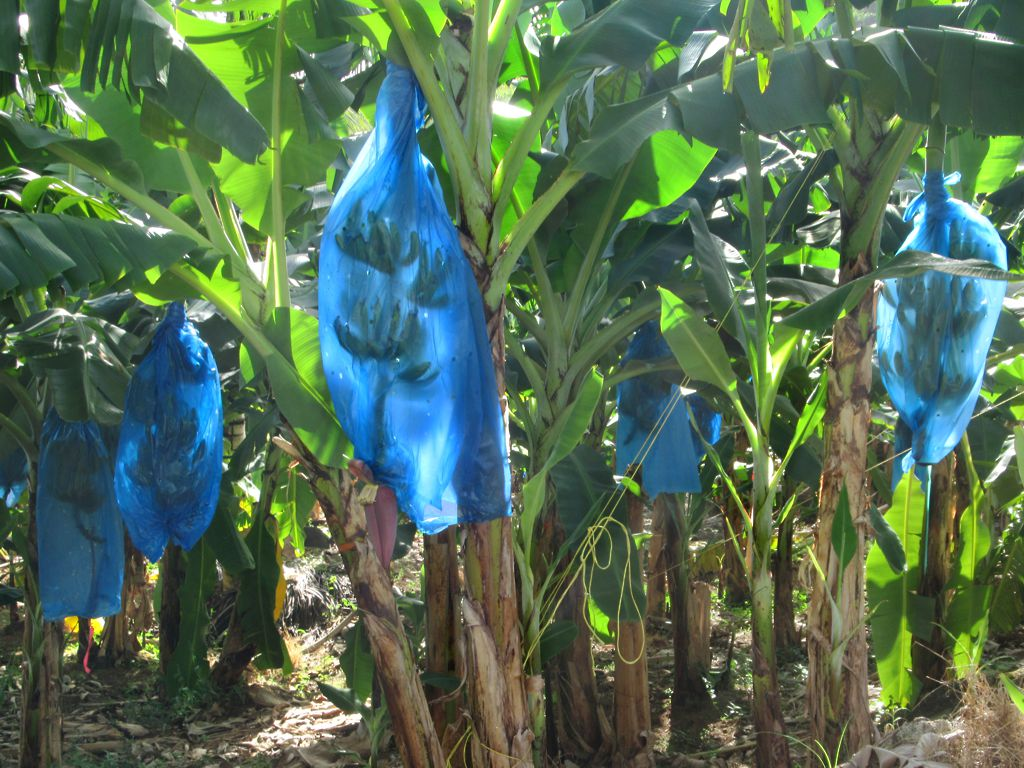
St. Lucia Bananas

Agriculture is the second-largest industry in Saint Lucia. In 2020, agriculture only contributed 2.2% to Saint Lucia's GDP, but still accounts for a significant number of jobs - some 10% of the employed population. As of the 2010 census, the roughly 10,000 agricultural holdings covered an area of 30,204 acres, an average of 3.0 acres per agricultural holding.

About 18% of the land is used for agricultural practices. Most farms consist of less than 5 acres of land. The main agricultural products grown in Saint Lucia are bananas, coconuts, cocoa beans, mangoes, avocados, vegetables, citrus fruits, and root crops such as yams and sweet potatoes. Most of these agricultural products are grown for local consumption, but bananas and coconuts are mainly grown for export, with some vegetables. Bananas occupy about 14,826 acres of the agricultural land, while coconuts occupy 12,400 acres.

Saint Lucia has a small livestock sector, which is dominated by poultry and pork. The island is self-sufficient in egg production and is trying to become self-sufficient in poultry and pork production. The Ministry of Agriculture is encouraging farmers to raise sheep and goats to reduce the island's importation of frozen meats, and has helped by providing support to farmers, importing bloodlines of livestock to increase the productivity of animals, and providing subsidies on animal feed.

Help is also being given to revitalize the local dairy and beef industries through the introduction of efficient cattle breeds, training of farmers to care properly for livestock, and establishing funds for the construction of dairy units and abattoirs.

The island is also looking to expand its exports under the Taste of Saint Lucia brand sponsored by Export Saint Lucia. Products that are being promoted include Saint Lucia Honey, rum, chocolate, coconut oil, granola, and insect repellent.

=== Tourism ===
The island currently attracts over 900,000 visitors annually. St Lucia has been able to attract foreign businesses and investment, especially in its offshore banking and tourism industries. Tourism is St Lucia's main source of jobs and income, accounting for 65% of GDP, and the island's main source of foreign exchange earnings. The northern end of St Lucia is tourism's most urbanized area, with a fair number of hotels and resorts located along beaches, or with seaside views. This is also home to many of the island's large, all-inclusive resorts.

=== Offshore financial services ===
Saint Lucia developed an offshore financial services sector in the late 1990s and early 2000s as part of efforts to diversify its economy beyond agriculture and tourism. A central element of this framework is the International Business Companies Act (Cap. 12.14), enacted in 1999 and brought into force in 2001, which introduced the international business company (IBC) as a legal vehicle for non-resident business activity.

Following the enactment of the IBC Act, the number of companies registered in Saint Lucia increased steadily during the 2000s and 2010s. Official registry data and sectoral reviews indicate that the total number of registered international companies rose from just over 1,000 in the early 2000s to more than 3,000 by the early 2020s, reflecting the expansion of corporate administration and fiduciary services linked to offshore incorporation.

Complementary legislation expanded the scope of offshore services beyond company formation. The International Trusts Act of 2002 provides for the establishment of trusts for non-residents, commonly used for asset-holding and estate-planning purposes, subject to the requirement that at least one trustee be licensed in Saint Lucia. Offshore banking is governed by the International Banks Act, which permits the licensing of banks restricted to conducting business with non-resident clients and prohibits domestic retail banking activities.

Regulatory oversight of offshore financial activities is exercised by the Financial Services Regulatory Authority (FSRA), which licenses and supervises international banks, trust service providers, and registered agents. Corporate incorporation and statutory filings for IBCs and related entities are administered by the Registry of Companies and Intellectual Property (ROCIP), which maintains the national corporate register and operates the electronic filing system.

In response to international tax transparency initiatives, Saint Lucia enacted the Economic Substance Act in 2019, requiring entities engaged in defined relevant activities to demonstrate adequate economic presence in the jurisdiction. As part of these reforms, the country adopted a territorial tax system under which companies are taxed only on income sourced within Saint Lucia, while foreign-source income remains exempt, subject to compliance with substance requirements. Following these changes, Saint Lucia was removed from the European Union list of non-cooperative jurisdictions for tax purposes in 2021.

== Infrastructure ==
=== Transport ===
Transport in Saint Lucia includes transportation to and from Saint Lucia, which is a sovereign island country located in the eastern Caribbean Sea. It also includes transportation from one part of the island to another.

== Economic trends ==
The level of island households living at or below the poverty level increased from 18.7 to 21.4% from 1995 to 2005. As of 2006, another 16.2% of the island's population are vulnerable to economic shocks that could easily push them below the poverty line. One rural district had 44.9% of households living below the poverty line (2005).

To broaden the island's economic base, the government added small, computer-driven information technology and financial services as development objectives.

St. Lucia's leading revenue producers—agriculture, tourism, and small-scale manufacturing—benefited from a focus on infrastructure improvements in roads, communications, water supply, sewerage, and port facilities. Foreign investors also have been attracted by the infrastructure improvements and by the educated and skilled work force and relatively stable political conditions. The largest investment is in a petroleum storage and transshipment terminal built by Hess Oil. The Caribbean Development Bank funded an airport expansion project.

Until the events of 11 September 2001, the tourism sector had made significant gains, experiencing a boom despite some untimely and destructive hurricanes. Stay-over visitors and cruise arrivals declined in 2001, and several hotels declared bankruptcy, including the Hyatt. The development of the tourism sector remains a priority, and the government is committed to providing a favourable investment environment. Incentives are available for building and upgrading tourism facilities. Use of public funds to improve the physical infrastructure of the island has been liberal, and the government has made efforts to attract cultural and sporting events and develop historical sites.

== Overview ==
St. Lucia's economy depends primarily on revenue from tourism and banana production, with some contribution from small-scale manufacturing.

Although banana revenues have helped fund the country's development since the 1960s, the industry is now in a terminal decline, due to reduced European Union trade preferences and competition from lower-cost Latin American banana producers. The country is encouraging farmers to plant crops such as cocoa, mangoes, and avocados to diversify its agricultural production and provide jobs for displaced banana workers.

Tourism recovered in 2004, following the post-11 September 2001 recession, and continued to grow in 2005, making up more than 48% of St. Lucia's GDP. The hotel and restaurant industry grew by 6.3% during 2005. Stay-over arrivals increased by 6.5%, and the United States remained the most important market, accounting for 35.4% of these arrivals. Yacht passengers rose by 21.9%. Redeployment of cruise ships, remedial berth construction, and high fuel costs prevented higher growth rates. However, several investors have planned new tourism projects for the island, including a large hotel and resort in the southern part of the island. The global recession has caused a reduction in tourist revenue and foreign investment, significantly slowing growth rates.

St. Lucia's currency is the Eastern Caribbean Dollar (EC$), a regional currency shared among members of the Eastern Caribbean Currency Union (ECCU). The Eastern Caribbean Central Bank (ECCB) issues the EC$, manages monetary policy, and regulates and supervises commercial banking activities in its member countries. The ECCB has kept the EC$ pegged at EC$2.7 = US$1.

St. Lucia is a beneficiary of the U.S. Caribbean Basin Initiative and is a member of the Caribbean Community and Common Market. The country hosts the executive secretariat of the Organization of Eastern Caribbean States.

St. Lucia is the headquarters of the Eastern Caribbean Telecommunications authority, which is developing the regulations to liberalize the telecommunications sector in the region by 2004.

== Economic statistics ==
Exports of Saint Lucia by product category (2019) Chemical products Transportation Machines Mineral products Plastics and rubbers Metals Foodstuffs Precious metals Textiles Instruments Animal products Vegetable products Paper goods Footwear and headwear Miscellaneous Stone and glass Wood products Animal and vegetable bi-products Animal hides Arts and antiques Weapons

Saint Lucia electricity production by source

GDP: purchasing power parity - $1,667 billion (2016 est.)

GDP - real growth rate: 3.5% (2012 est.)

GDP - per capita: purchasing power parity - $12,952 (2016 est.)

GDP - composition by sector:

- agriculture: 2.43%
- industry: 13.43%
- services: 84.14% (2016 est.)

Population below poverty line: 21.4% (2005)

Household income or consumption by percentage share:
lowest 10%: NA%
highest 10%: NA%

Inflation rate (consumer prices): -0.934% (2016 est.)

Labour force: 50,300 (2011)

Labour force - by occupation:

- agriculture 21.7%,
- industry and commerce 24.7%,
- services 53.6% (2002 est.)

Unemployment rate: 15% (2013 est.)

Pay: best is $350 a week

Budget:
revenues: $141.2 million
expenditures: $146.7 million, including capital expenditures of $25.1 million (2000 estimate) Industries: clothing, assembly of electronic components, beverages, corrugated cardboard boxes, tourism, lime processing, coconut processing

Industrial production growth rate:

- 8.9% (1997 est.)

Electricity - production: 281 GWh (2003)

Electricity - production by source:
fossil fuel: 100%
hydro: 0%
nuclear: 0%
other: 0% (1998)

Electricity - consumption: 102 KWh (1998)

Agriculture - products:
bananas, coconuts, vegetables, citrus, root crops, cocoa

Exports: $82 million (2004)

Exports - commodities:
bananas 41%, clothing, cocoa, vegetables, fruits, coconut oil

Exports - partners:
France 25%, United States 18.3%, United Kingdom 14.5%, Brazil 6.8% (2005)

Imports: $410 million (2004)

Imports - commodities:
food 23%, manufactured goods 21%, machinery and transportation equipment 19%, chemicals, fuels

Imports - partners: United States 23.8%, Trinidad and Tobago 16%, Netherlands 11.1%, Venezuela 6.3%, Finland 6.2%, United Kingdom 5.7%, France 4.7% (2005)

Debt - external:

- $214 million (2000)

Economic aid - recipient: $51.8 million (1995)

Currency: 1 East Caribbean dollar (EC$) = 100 cents

Exchange rates: East Caribbean dollars (EC$) per US$1 – 2.7000 (fixed rate since 1976)

Fiscal year: 1 April – 31 March
