= Saint Lucia Solid Waste Management Authority =

The St. Lucia Solid Waste Management Authority (SLUSWMA) was established in October 1996 by an Act of Parliament No. 20 of 1996, in which the Authority was given the following mandate:

- Manage, regulate, control and treat waste in Saint Lucia
- Establish, maintain, improve and regulate the use sanitary landfills and facilities, in accordance with established scientific principles and practices
- Establish and manage facilities for the collection and treatment of all including hazardous waste
- Establish and maintain transfer stations
- Establish and promote a resource recovery system
- Oversee scheduling, safety and maintenance issues associated with solid waste management
- Promote and oversee public education related to solid waste management in collaboration with the relevant ministries
- Develop a network to receive, monitor and respond to public complaints.

== Mission statement ==
To enhance Saint Lucia's environmental integrity and the health of her people through the provision and management of an integrated system of public education and awareness and for the collection, treatment, recycling and disposal of solid and hazardous waste.
