= List of diplomatic missions of Saint Lucia =

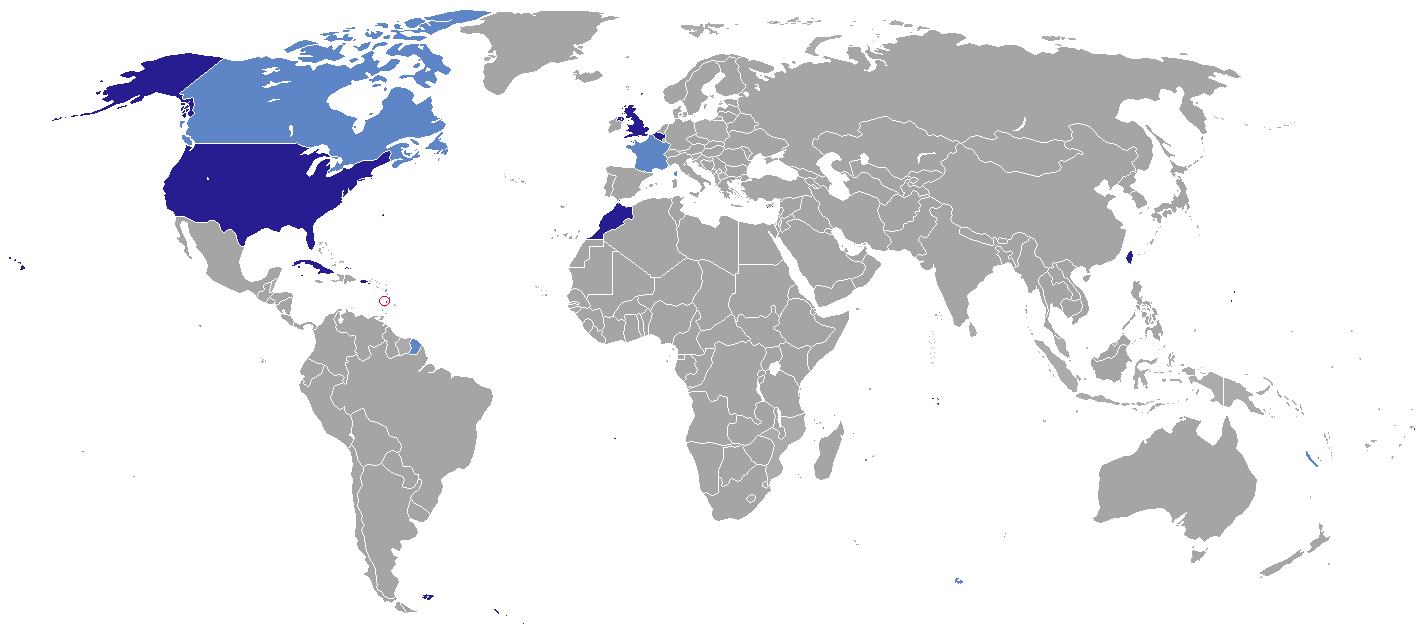
Location of diplomatic missions of Saint Lucia: Saint Lucia Embassy or High Commission Consulate-General

This is a list of diplomatic missions of Saint Lucia. Saint Lucia has a modest number of diplomatic missions appropriate to the country's size. Its embassy and mission to the European Union in Brussels and its embassy in Morocco is shared with other East Caribbean states.

== Current missions ==
=== Africa ===
Host country	Host city	Mission	Concurrent accreditation	Ref.
Morocco	Rabat	Embassy		

=== Americas ===
Host country	Host city	Mission	Concurrent accreditation	Ref.
Canada	Toronto	Consulate-General		
Cuba	Havana	Embassy		
United States	Washington, D.C.	Embassy	Countries: Canada; International Organizations: Organization of American States	
United States	Coral Gables	Consulate-General	Countries: Canada; International Organizations: Organization of American States	
United States	New York City	Consulate-General	Countries: Canada; International Organizations: Organization of American States	

=== Asia ===
Host country	Host city	Mission	Concurrent accreditation	Ref.
Taiwan (Taiwan)	Taipei	Embassy		

=== Europe ===
Host country	Host city	Mission	Concurrent accreditation	Ref.
Belgium	Brussels	Embassy	International Organizations: European Union	
France	Fort-de-France, Martinique	Consulate-General		
United Kingdom	London	High Commission		

=== Multilateral organizations ===
Organization	Host city	Host country	Mission	Concurrent accreditation	Ref.
United Nations	Geneva	Switzerland	Permanent Mission		
United Nations	New York City	United States	Permanent Mission	Countries: Guatemala; Indonesia	

== Gallery ==
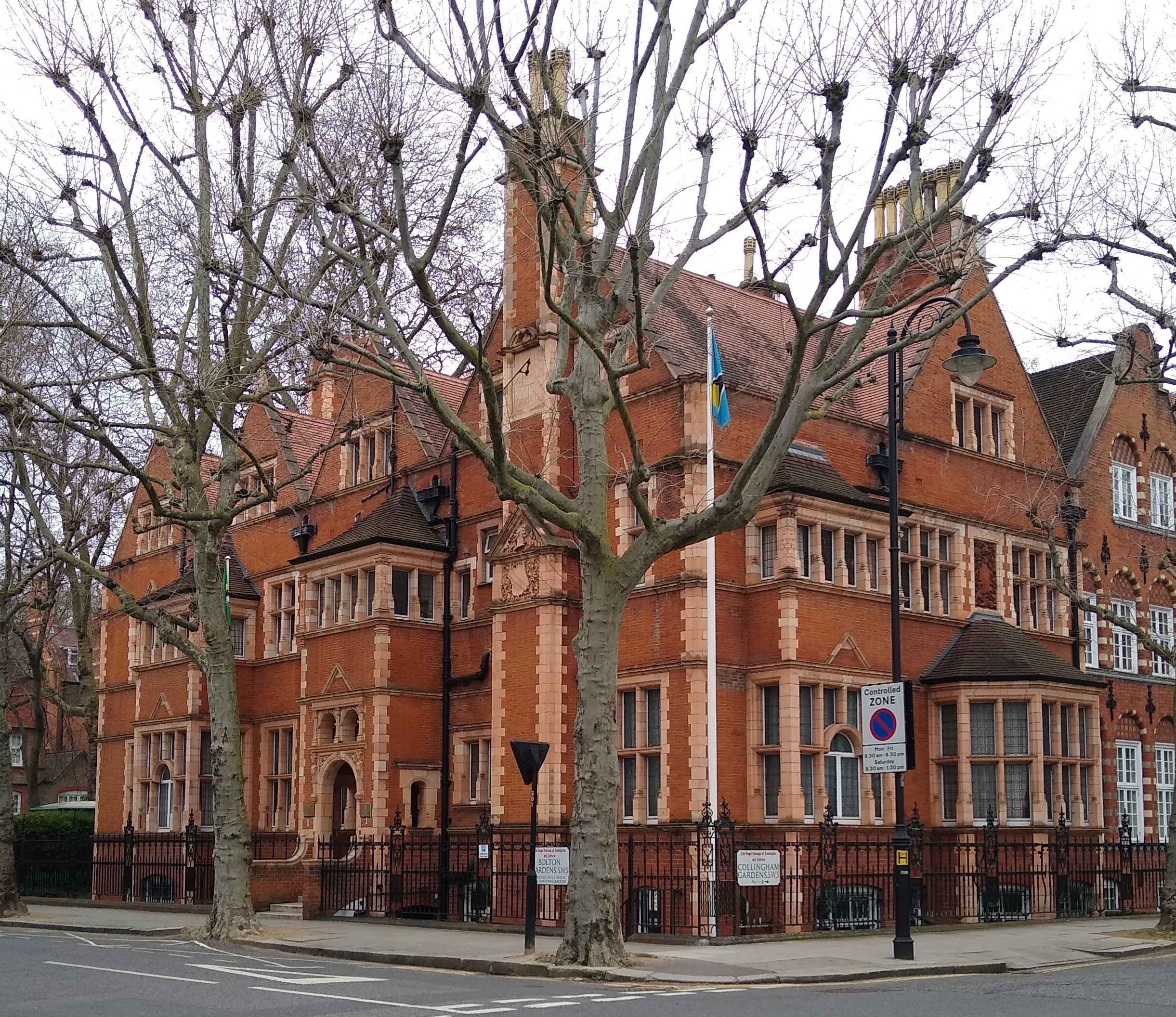
High Commission in London

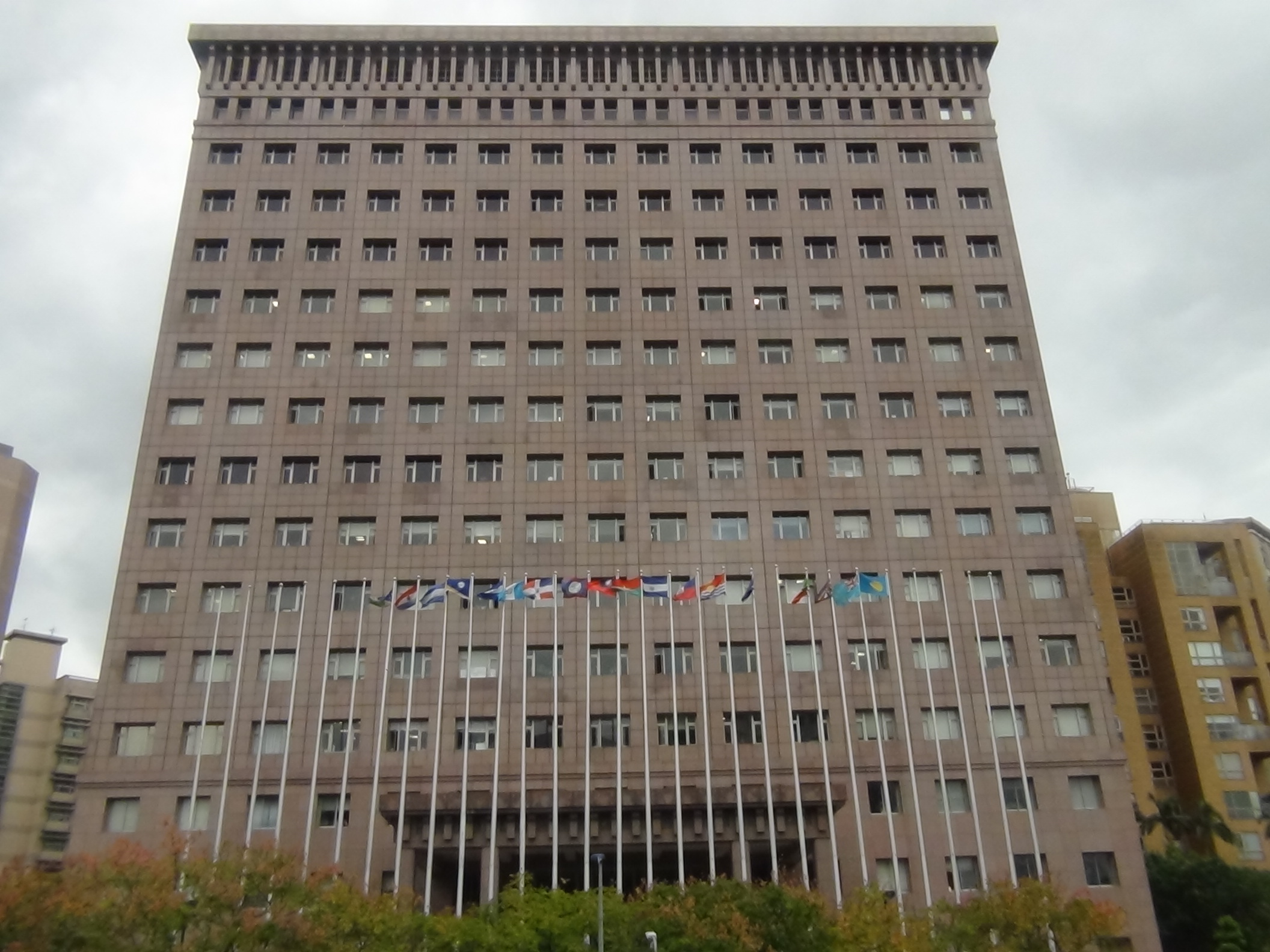
Embassy in Taipei

== See also ==
- Foreign relations of Saint Lucia
- List of diplomatic missions in Saint Lucia
- Visa policy of Saint Lucia
