= Geology of Saint Lucia =

The geology of Saint Lucia includes exposed Miocene rocks—the most northerly in the Volcanic Caribbees section of the Lesser Antilles volcanic island arc. These rocks include calc-alkalkine and arc tholeiite igneous rocks. The oldest formed up to 18 million years ago in the north.
