= Sport in Saint Lucia =

Overview of sports in Saint Lucia

Sports in Saint Lucia consist of a wide variety of games. St. Lucia won its first Olympics medal in 2024 when Julien Alfred won the women's 100 metres.

== Football ==
Saint Lucia has its own national football team. Association football is the most popular sport in the country after cricket.

== Cricket ==
Daren Sammy was the first and only Saint Lucian to be called up to the West Indies Cricket Team. Sammy was the first Saint Lucian to play Test cricket in the West Indies and his figures were the second best by a West Indian debutante after Alf Valentine took eight wickets in 1950. Saint Lucia annually hosts games in the West Indies limited-overs and four-day cricket competitions, usually at the Beausejour Cricket Grounds, one of the most modern facilities in West Indies cricket. Sammy played his first major international match at Beausejour in 2008, a one-day international against Sri Lanka. Nadine George is another of Saint Lucia's leading cricketers. She was the first West Indies woman to hit a century in Test cricket and was eventually named captain of the West Indies team.

== Athletics ==
St Lucia is also home to Levern Spencer, who is a high jumper and holds the national record of 1.94 meters. She has won Pan American Commonwealth and CAC Games medals.

Darvin Edwards holds the St Lucian National Record for the men's High Jump with a height of 2.31m. He won a bronze medal at the 2011 Central American and Caribbean Championships in Athletics.

At the 2024 Summer Olympics, Julien Alfred won St Lucia's first Olympic medals, taking gold in the women's 100m and silver in the women's 200m.

== Golf ==
There are three golf courses in St Lucia. The Sandals St Lucia golf course is equipped with 18 holes and is on the southern part of the island. The St Lucia Golf & Country club has 18 holes and Jalousie Hilton Resort & Spa has nine holes.

== Tennis ==
Tennis is growing in popularity in St Lucia. The St Lucian hotel of the island offers two coobuip Junior Tournament takes place. St Lucia is also an annual competitor in the Davis Cup, an international tennis competition, with former Sportsman of the Year Vernon Lewis and Kane Easter having been two of the island's consistent players over the years. In April 2011, the St Lucian government opened tennis center, with the aim of helping development future tennis athletes. The nation is also home to Tigers Inflow Tennis Academy.

== Volleyball ==
Volleyball enjoyed a period of growth in the 1980s, when club rivalries between teams like Le Club and Ciceron Seagulls fuelled growth in interest. St Lucia won the Organisation of Eastern Caribbean States (OECS) men's and women's volleyball competitions a number of times, including having won the women's tournament when it was held for the first time at the Beausejour Indoor Facility in 2008. The Beasejour gymnasium also hosted the first round of the men's and women's FIVB World Volleyball Championships in 2008.

== Other ==
Netball, rugby, swimming and basketball are rapidly becoming popular around the island. The Rodney Heights Aquatic Centre is a short-course (25m) swimming facility in the north of the island. St Lucia has also won multiple OECS Championships in swimming.

Squash is also relatively popular in St Lucia. The prime squash courts of St Lucia are found in the adjoining areas of St Lucia Racquet Club and St Lucia Yacht Club. St Lucia has hosted and won several iterations of the OECS Squash Tournament.

St Lucia was recently represented by a team of 48 who proceeded to Grenada on July 25, 2008 to participate in the Windward Islands Inter-School Championship Games. The tournament included Male and Female Volleyball, in which both the male and female teams were victorious, Male and Female Basketball, Netball, Football and Track and Field.

== Stadiums in St. Lucia ==
Stadium	Country	Capacity	Image
Daren Sammy Cricket Ground	St. Lucia	15,000	

== See also ==
- Lists of stadiums
