= The Saint Lucia Scout Association =

- Location: Massade, Gros-Islet, Castries
- Country: Saint Lucia
- Membership: 393
- Affiliation: World Organization of the Scout Movement

The Saint Lucia Scout Association (SLSA) is the national Scouting organization of Saint Lucia. Scouting in Saint Lucia started in 1910 and became a member of the World Organization of the Scout Movement (WOSM) in 1990. The coeducational association has 393 members (as of 2010).

== History ==
Scouting in Saint Lucia started in 1910 as an overseas branch of The Scout Association (UK). In 1935, the Saint Lucia Scout Association was officially founded as a branch of British Scouting. After the independence of Saint Lucia in 1979, the national association worked towards recognition by WOSM, which was received in 1990. The SLSA hosted the Caribbean Jamboree in 2000.

== Program and ideals ==
The association is divided in three age-groups:

- Cub Scouts (ages 7 to 11)
- Scouts (ages 12 to 15)
- Rover Scouts (ages 16 to 20)

The membership badge of the Saint Lucia Scout Association incorporates elements of the coat of arms of Saint Lucia, and the top of the design is intended to evoke the Pitons, the island's two large peaks that rise from the ocean and are recognized symbols of the island.

== See also ==
- Girl Guides Association of Saint Lucia
