= List of airports in Saint Lucia =

List of airports in Saint Lucia, sorted by location.

== List ==
LOCATION	ICAO	IATA	Airport name	Coordinates
Castries	TLPC	SLU	George F. L. Charles Airport (formerly Vigie Airport)	14°01′13″N 060°59′35″W
Vieux-Fort	TLPL	UVF	Hewanorra International Airport	13°44′00″N 060°57′09″W

== See also ==
- Transport in Saint Lucia
- List of airports by ICAO code: T#TL - Saint Lucia
- Wikipedia: WikiProject Aviation/Airline destination lists: North America#Saint Lucia
