= Education in Saint Lucia =

Education in St. Lucia

General details
- Primary languages: English
- Primary: 14,715 students
- Secondary: 11,116 students

Education in St. Lucia is primarily based on the British education system and is provided in public and private schools.

The Human Rights Measurement Initiative (HRMI) finds that St. Lucia fulfills 85.2% of what it should be fulfilling for the right to education based on the country's level of income. HRMI breaks down the right to education by examining the rights to both primary and secondary education. While taking into consideration St. Lucia's income level, the nation achieves 87.8% of what should be possible based on its resources (income) for primary education and 82.6% for secondary education.

Education in St Lucia is compulsory between ages 5 to 15. St Lucia has achieved universal primary education, and universal secondary education. School hours are normally from 9 a.m. to 3 p.m., with secondary schools starting at 8 a.m. and ending at 2:30 p.m. There are approximately 74 primary schools in St Lucia, and 23 secondary schools.

Before its Independence, schools in St. Lucia were managed by different religious denominations, in particular the Roman Catholic Church, the Seventh-day Adventist church, and Methodist churches.

== Primary Education ==
Following time perhaps spent at pre-school, children enter primary school for 7 years to learn the rudiments of literacy, numeracy and social sciences, from Infant School (Grade K) to Primary School (Grades 1–6). At the end of Grade 6, students write the Common Entrance Examination to determine placement for additional compulsory schooling.

== Tertiary Education ==
Tertiary education is provided through University of the West Indies (UWI) distance learning programs, and the local Sir Arthur Lewis Community College (SALCC), which is evolving into a degree-awarding institution.

It has 4 Divisions, namely Agriculture, Arts, Science & General Studies, Teacher Education & Educational Administration, and Technical Education & Management Studies, and 10 Departments undergird these.

St Lucia has some medical schools and universities. The Sir Arthur Lewis Community College is located in Castries, where most St Lucians go to further their studies. The literacy rate in St Lucia is estimated to be 90%.
