= Transport in Saint Lucia =

Transport in Saint Lucia includes transportation to and from Saint Lucia, which is a sovereign island country located in the eastern Caribbean Sea. It also includes transportation from one part of the island to another.

== By air ==
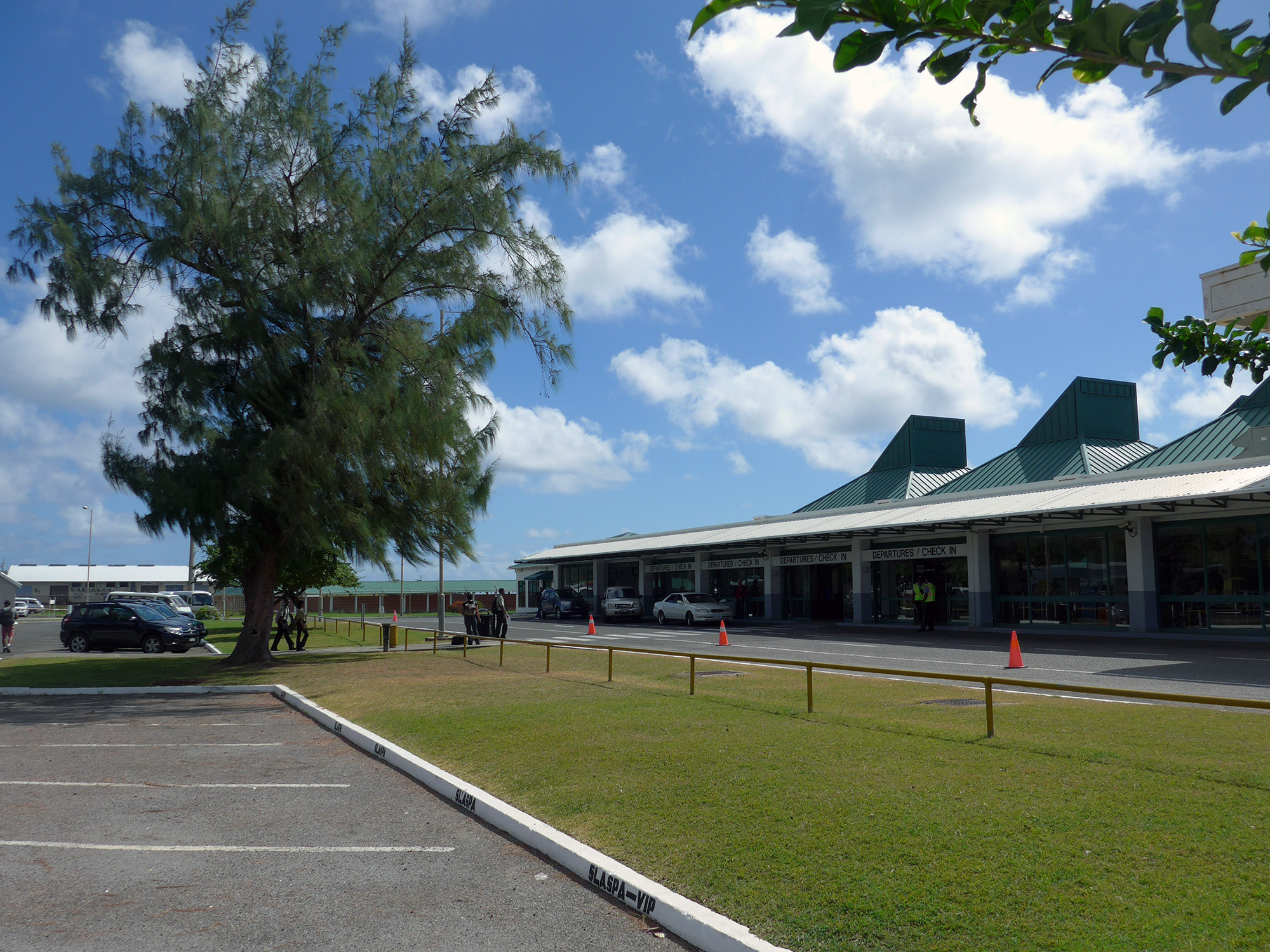
Hewanorra International Airport

Saint Lucia is served by two airports. Larger jets arrive at Hewanorra International Airport located in Vieux Fort, 40 miles south of Castries (which is the island's capital and largest city). Smaller inter-island planes land at George F.L. Charles Airport, just outside of Castries. Many major airlines serve Saint Lucia. Several smaller airlines fly to George F.L. Charles Airport via neighbouring islands. Saint Lucia is a member of the Eastern Caribbean Civil Aviation Authority and hosts its Hewanorra Outstation at Hewanorra International Airport.

== By sea ==
Cruise ships enter the main seaport at Castries, and dock at one of the facilities there. Fast and modern catamaran can be booked for travel to and from the islands of Martinique, Guadeloupe, and Dominica. Yachts dock at various facilities in Castries, Marigot Bay, or Rodney Bay.

== Public transportation (bus) ==
Saint Lucia's mini buses offer inexpensive transportation and run until approximately 10 pm (longer on Friday nights when the weekly "jump up" takes place at Gros Islet). All buses are registered with a green 'M' licence plate and labelled with a yellow sticker on the front of the vehicle, signifying their route.

== Taxis ==
Taxis are widely available at the airports and city centers. Fares are not metered, but rather fixed for each destination. Taxi drivers can confirm the cost and currency (EC$ or US$) of the fare before each trip is made. Taxi licence plates are red or blue, and begin with the letters TX.

== Trucking ==
Truckers are an integral part of the business of shipping especially heavy-duty truckers moving containerised cargo. Over the years this sector of business has grown significantly with a number of major companies competing for the business. Despite this competitive spirit they have been practical and wise enough to see the benefits of forming a Truckers Association, which was established some five years ago but is currently dormant. With the number of issues being faced, members are currently engaged in re-energising the association to interface with the various stakeholders to address a catalogue of observations they want to share with the main shipping actors, including SLASPA and Customs.

Some of the issues being faced are the costs for operating the business are going up - including fuel, tyres, parts, labour, etc.

Among the issues are of concern, some of which require better recognition and involvement from the Transport Board are:

- Truck Driver Certification/ Licensing. At the current time there is no specific training tobqualify individuals to drive heavy duty vehicles in Saint Lucia. This could be rectified by establishing a driving school to certify truck drivers. "Right now, anyone can buy a truck and hire someone, with or without a truck driver's license, to join the trade and get into the trucking business. That's not right or fair." says Gregory Monplaisir, owner of Monplaisir Trucking.
- Road Repairs. Discussions with relevant departments regarding road repairs should take container trucks into consideration. Roads are being repaired and realigned, but in some cases they have now become too small for our larger trucks, forcing them to have to drive in the middle of the road, at great inconvenience to others, but necessary in the interest of customers' cargo, and the safety of drivers and pedestrians alike.

== See also ==
- Saint Lucia
- Hewanorra International Airport
