= Demographics of Saint Lucia =

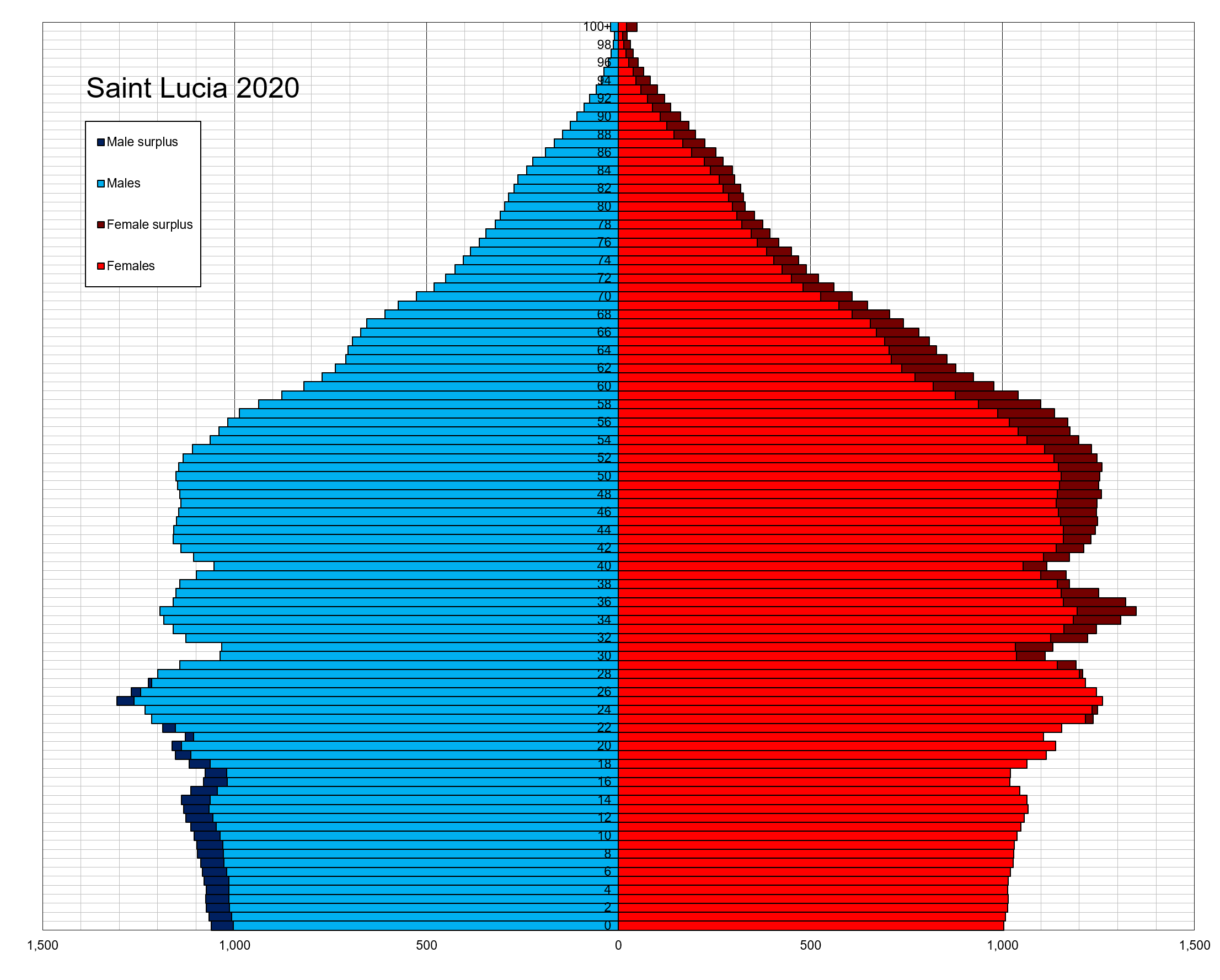
- Population pyramid of Saint Lucia in 2020
- Population: 167,122 (2022 est.)
- Growth rate: 0.29% (2022 est.)
- Birth rate: 12.02 births/1,000 population (2022 est.)
- Death rate: 8.07 deaths/1,000 population (2022 est.)
- Life expectancy: 78.95 years
- Fertility rate: 1.72 children born/woman (2022 est.)
- Infant mortality: 11.99 deaths/1,000 live births
- Net migration rate: -1.09 migrant(s)/1,000 population (2022 est.)

Age structure
- 0–14 years: 19.24%
- 65 and over: 13.1%

Nationality
- Nationality: Saint Lucian
- Major ethnic: Black/African descent (85.3%)

Language
- Official: English

This is a demography of the population of Saint Lucia including population density, ethnicity, education level, health of the populace, economic status, religious affiliations and other aspects of the population.

Census population and average annual growth rate
Year	Pop.	±% p.a.
1843	20,694	—
1851	24,185	+1.97%
1861	26,674	+0.98%
1871	31,610	+1.71%
1881	38,551	+2.00%
1891	42,220	+0.91%
1901	49,883	+1.68%
1911	48,637	−0.25%
1921	51,505	+0.57%
1946	70,113	+1.24%
1960	86,108	+1.48%
1970	100,893	+1.60%
1980	113,409	+1.18%
1991	133,308	+1.48%
2001	157,775	+1.70%
2010	165,595	+0.54%
2022	171,834	+0.31%

== Population ==
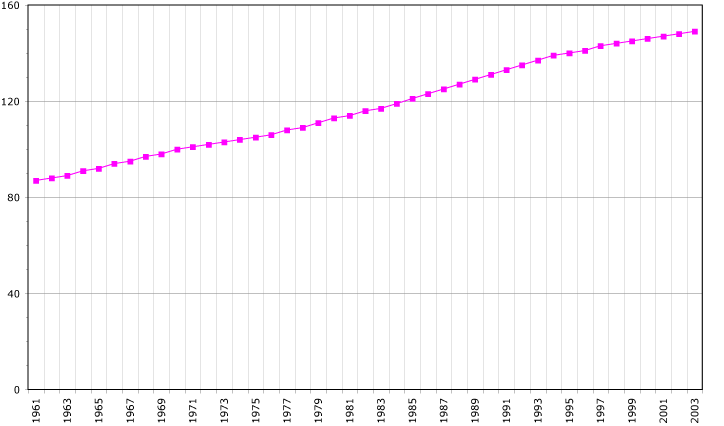
Demographics of Saint Lucia, Data of FAO, year 2005; Number of inhabitants in thousands

According to the 2018 population census, Saint Lucia had a population of 179,667. The official estimated population as of 1 July 2023 was 184,100. The population is evenly divided between urban and rural areas.

=== Structure of the population ===
Population by Sex and Age Group (Census 10.V.2010) (Provisional) (Population in households only.):

Age group	Male	Female	Total	%
Total	81 919	83 675	165 594	100
0–4	5 979	5 831	11 810	7.13
5–9	6 678	6 472	13 150	7.94
10–14	7 479	7 439	14 918	9.01
15–19	8 116	7 805	15 921	9.61
20–24	6 744	6 876	13 620	8.22
25–29	6 553	6 736	13 289	8.03
30–34	6 150	6 103	12 253	7.40
35–39	5 952	6 333	12 285	7.42
40–44	6 043	6 175	12 218	7.38
45–49	5 496	5 467	10 963	6.62
50–54	4 447	4 479	8 926	5.39
55–59	3 177	3 313	6 490	3.92
60–64	2 687	2 797	5 484	3.31
65-69	2 087	2 293	4 380	2.65
70-74	1 722	1 869	3 591	2.17
75-79	1 145	1 420	2 565	1.55
80-84	796	1 108	1 904	1.15
85-89	428	742	1 170	0.71
90-94	163	282	445	0.27
95-99	69	107	176	0.11
100+	8	28	36	0.02
Age group	Male	Female	Total	Percent
0–14	20 136	19 742	39 878	24.08
15–64	55 365	56 084	111 449	67.30
65+	6 418	7 849	14 267	8.62

Population Estimates by Sex and Age Group (01.VII.2021) (Data refer to usual resident population.):

Age group	Male	Female	Total	%
Total	90 419	91 860	182 279	100
0–4	5 381	5 266	10 647	5.84
5–9	5 263	5 047	10 310	5.66
10–14	5 750	5 504	11 254	6.17
15–19	6 307	6 047	12 353	6.78
20–24	6 900	6 839	13 739	7.54
25–29	8 028	7 773	15 801	8.67
30–34	7 594	7 595	15 189	8.33
35–39	7 265	7 425	14 691	8.06
40–44	6 894	6 612	13 507	7.41
45–49	6 458	6 370	12 828	7.04
50–54	6 260	6 352	12 612	6.92
55–59	5 734	5 791	11 524	6.32
60–64	4 670	4 823	9 493	5.21
65-69	3 162	3 500	6 662	3.65
70-74	2 192	2 602	4 794	2.63
75-79	1 376	1 916	3 292	1.81
80-84	775	1 274	2 049	1.12
85+	410	1 124	1 534	0.84
Age group	Male	Female	Total	Percent
0–14	16 394	15 817	32 211	17.67
15–64	66 110	65 627	131 737	72.27
65+	7 915	10 416	18 331	10.06

== Vital statistics ==
	Average population	Live births	Deaths	Natural change	Crude birth rate (per 1000)	Crude death rate (per 1000)	Natural change (per 1000)	Total fertility rate	Infant mortality rate
1950	79,000	2,820	1,184	1,636	34.1	14.3	19.8		
1951	80,000	2,892	1,389	1,503	34.5	16.6	17.9		
1952	81,000	2,906	1,246	1,660	34.3	14.7	19.6		
1953	81,000	3,069	1,156	1,913	35.9	13.5	22.4		
1954	82,000	3,090	1,028	2,062	35.9	11.9	23.9		
1955	83,000	3,549	1,034	2,515	41.0	11.9	29.0		
1956	83,000	3,571	1,127	2,444	41.0	12.9	28.0		
1957	84,000	3,924	1,270	2,654	44.7	14.5	30.3		
1958	85,000	3,952	1,269	2,683	44.7	14.4	30.4		
1959	85,000	4,108	1,297	2,811	46.1	14.6	31.6		
1960	86,444	4,240	1,281	2,959	47.2	14.2	32.9		
1961	87,800	4,011	1,228	2,783	44.1	13.5	30.6		
1962	89,178	3,935	1,186	2,749	42.7	12.9	29.9		
1963	90,577	3,981	1,069	2,912	42.6	11.4	31.2		
1964	91,998	4,098	864	3,234	43.2	9.1	34.1		
1965	93,441	4,379	842	3,537	45.5	8.7	36.7		
1966	94,907	4,307	746	3,561	44.0	7.6	36.4		
1967	96,396	4,340	887	3,453	43.6	8.9	34.7		
1968	97,908	4,152	821	3,331	41.0	8.1	32.9		
1969	99,444	4,057	791	3,266	39.5	7.7	31.8		
1970	101,366	3,958	825	3,133	38.0	7.9	30.1		
1971	102,779	4,083	802	3,281	38.7	7.6	31.1		
1972	104,192	4,151	950	3,201	39.0	8.9	30.1		
1973	105,605	4,054	835	3,219	37.7	7.8	30.0		
1974	107,018	3,909	827	3,082	36.0	7.6	28.4		
1975	108,431	4,016	855	3,161	37.0	7.8	29.2		
1976	109,844	3,981	893	3,088	36.2	8.0	28.2		
1977	111,257	4,127	815	3,312	37.1	7.2	29.4		
1978	112,670	4,029	781	3,248	35.8	6.8	28.4		
1979	114,083	3,808	850	2,958	33.4	7.3	25.4		
1980	115,499	3,944	843	3,101	34.1	7.1	26.3		
1981	117,360	3,811	843	2,968	32.5	7.0	25.5		
1982	119,360	4,045	845	3,200	33.9	7.0	26.4		
1983	121,083	3,936	795	3,141	32.5	6.5	26.0		
1984	122,944	4,040	740	3,300	32.9	5.9	27.0		
1985	124,805	4,223	824	3,399	33.8	6.5	26.9	3.5	
1986	126,666	4,036	843	3,193	31.9	6.6	25.3		
1987	128,527	3,914	934	2,980	30.5	7.1	23.4		
1988	130,388	3,579	902	2,677	27.4	6.8	20.6		
1989	132,249	3,652	882	2,770	27.6	6.5	20.4		
1990	134,110	3,506	874	2,632	26.1	6.3	19.8		
1991	135,975	3,657	866	2,791	26.9	6.2	20.7		
1992	137,607	3,762	919	2,843	27.3	6.5	20.8		
1993	139,909	3,556	907	2,649	25.4	6.3	18.4		
1994	142,688	3,568	915	2,653	25.0	6.3	18.7		
1995	145,437	3,705	940	2,765	25.5	6.4	18.8		
1996	147,062	3,148	950	2,198	21.4	6.4	15.0		
1997	149,666	3,444	981	2,463	23.0	6.5	16.3		
1998	151,952	2,950	976	1,974	19.4	6.4	12.9		
1999	154,220	2,997	981	2,016	19.4	6.3	13.0		
2000	155,996	2,904	941	1,963	18.6	6.0	12.5		
2001	157,775	2,788	998	1,790	17.7	6.3	11.3		
2002	158,644	2,598	960	1,638	16.4	6.0	10.2		
2003	159,513	2,367	1,046	1,321	14.8	6.5	8.3		
2004	160,382	2,384	1,114	1,270	14.9	6.8	8.1		
2005	161,250	2,298	1,110	1,188	14.3	6.9	7.4	1.5	21.3
2006	162,119	2,209	1,029	1,180	13.6	6.3	7.3	1.4	21.7
2007	162,988	2,191	1,029	1,162	13.4	6.3	7.1	1.5	16.9
2008	163,857	2,213	1,022	1,191	13.5	6.2	7.3	1.5	17.6
2009	164,726	2,192	954	1,238	13.3	5.8	7.5	1.5	16.9
2010	165,595 (census)	1,876	963	913	11.4	4.5	6.9	1.4	15.4
2011	167,366	2,001	1,109	892	12.2	5.9	6.3	1.5	20.9
2012	169,115	2,006	1,184	822	12.0	5.5	6.5	1.5	16.2
2013	170,745	2,175	1,113	1,062	12.7	6.5	6.2	1.64	
2014	172,623	2,026	1,358	668	11.7	7.9	3.8	1.52	
2015	174,257	2,168			12.4			1.63	26.1
2016	175,819	2,009			11.4			1.51	15.0
2017	177,301	1,889	1,237	652	10.7	7.0	3.7	1.42	31.0
2018	178,696	1,916	1,274	642	10.7	7.1	3.6	1.44	15.8
2019	179,995	1,930	1,428	502	10.7	7.9	2.8	1.45	
2020	181,192	1,844	1,329	515	10.2	7.3	2.9	1.38	
2021		1,943						1.46	
2022		1,792						1.34	
2023		1,647						1.22	
2024								1.17	
2025		1,326			7.7			1.06	

== Ethnic groups ==
Saint Lucia's population is predominantly African/black (141,216 in 2010; 85.3% of the total population) or of mixed African-European descent (17,965; 10.8%). 2.2% of the population is East Indian (3,575 residents in 2010) and 0.6% white (991). Saint Lucia also has a small Amerindian (Carib) population. During the past decades the Amerindian (Carib) increased from 366 at the 1991 census (0.3% of the population), 803 at the 2001 census (0.5% of the population) to 951 in 2010 (0.6% of the population).

The remaining 0.5% of the population includes Chinese (0.1%) and people from the Middle East (0.1%).

Ethnic groups of Saint Lucia
Ethnic groups	percent
Black	85.3%
Mixed	10.9%
East Indian	2.2%
Other	1.6%
Unspecified	0.1%

== Languages ==
The official language is English. Saint Lucian Creole French (Kwéyòl), which is colloquially referred to as Patois ("Patwa"), is spoken by 95% of the population. This Antillean Creole is used in literature and music, and is gaining official acknowledgement. Saint Lucian Creole is very related to Haitian Creole as it developed during the early period of French colonisation, the Creole is derived chiefly from French and West African languages, with some vocabulary from Carib and other sources. Saint Lucia is a member of La Francophonie.

== Religion ==
According to the 2010 census, 90.2% percent of the population of Saint Lucia is considered Christian, 2.3% has a non-Christian religion and 5.9% has no religion or did not state a religion (1.4%).

Roughly two thirds of Christians are Roman Catholics (61.5% of the total population), a reflection of early French influence on the island, and 25.5% are Protestant. The Seventh-day Adventists constitute the largest Protestant group, with 10.4% of the population. Pentecostals are the second largest group (8.9%). The next largest group are Evangelicals (2.3% of the population), followed by Baptists (2.2%). Other Christians include Anglicanism (3.4%) and Jehovah's Witnesses (1.1%).

The number of non-Christians is small. These religious groups include the Rastafarian Movement (1.9% of the population), Hinduism (0.3%) and Muslims (0.1%).

Religious groups of Saint Lucia
Religious groups	percent
Roman Catholic	61.5%
Protestant	25.5%
Seventh-day Adventist	10.4%
Pentecostal	8.9%
None	5.9%
Baptist	2.2%
Evangelical	2.3%
Other Christian	3.4%
Unspecified	1.4%
Church of God	1.5%
Anglican	1.6%
Rastafarian	1.9%
Jehovah's Witness	1.1%
Other Protestant	0.9%
Other	0.4%

In 2023, Saint Lucia was scored 4 out of 4 for religious freedom.

== See also ==
- Population by district
