= List of diplomatic missions in Saint Lucia =

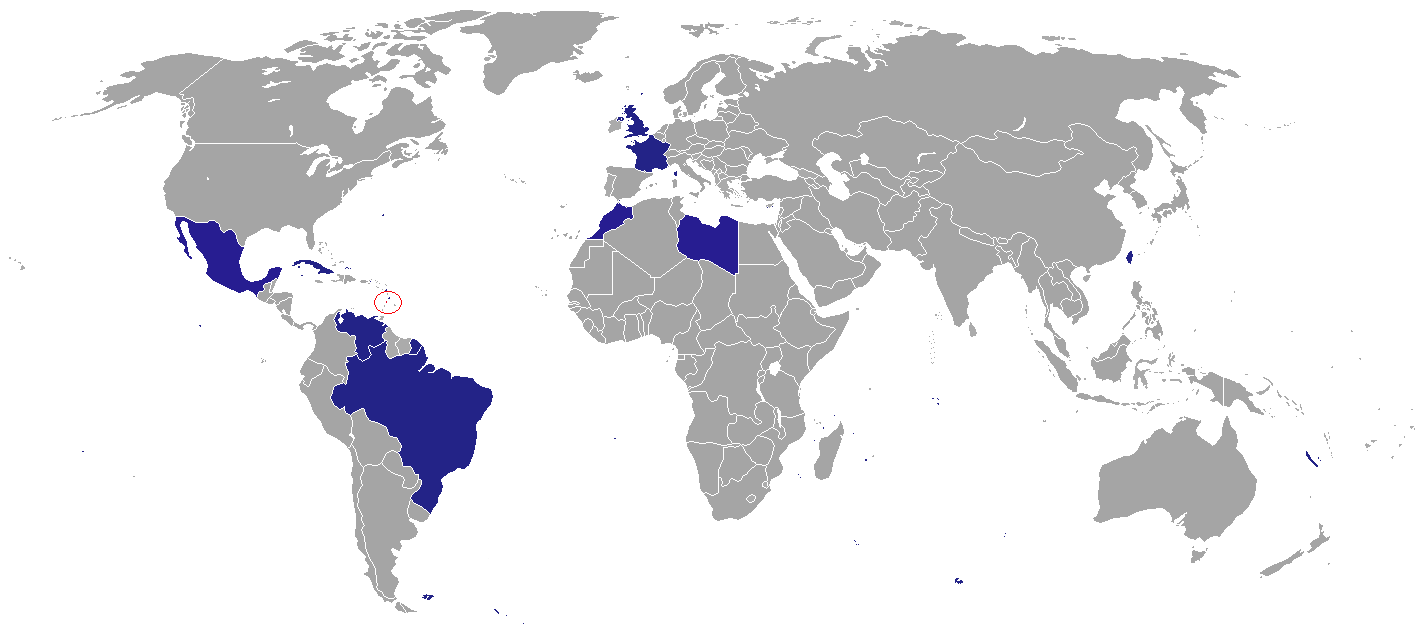
Map of diplomatic missions in Saint Lucia

This is a list of diplomatic missions in Saint Lucia. At present, the country hosts 9 embassies/high commissions.

== Resident Embassies/High Commissions ==
=== Castries ===
1. Brazil
2. Cuba
3. France
4. Libya
5. Mexico
6. Republic of China (Taiwan)
7. United Kingdom
8. Venezuela

=== Gros Islet ===
1. Morocco

== Non-resident embassies and high commissions ==
- Algeria (Caracas)
- Argentina (Bridgetown)
- Australia (Port-of-Spain)
- Austria (Bogotá)
- Bangladesh (New York City)
- Bahrain (New York City)
- Belgium (Kingston)
- Canada (Bridgetown)
- Central African Republic (New York City)
- Chile (Kingston)
- Colombia (Bridgetown)
- Czechia (Bogotá)
- Denmark (Mexico City)
- Egypt (Caracas)
- European Union (Bridgetown)
- Finland (Caracas)
- Germany (Port-of-Spain)
- Ghana (Port of Spain)
- Greece (Caracas)
- Guinea (New York City)
- Guatemala (Port-of-Spain)
- Haiti (Santo Domingo)
- Holy See (Port-of-Spain)
- Iceland (New York City)
- India (Paramaribo)
- Indonesia (Caracas)
- Ireland (New York City)
- Israel (Santo Domingo)
- Italy (Caracas)
- Ivory Coast (New York City)
- Jamaica (Port-of-Spain)
- Jordan (Washington, D.C.)
- Japan (Port-of-Spain)
- Kosovo (Panama City)
- Kuwait (Caracas)
- Kenya (Washington, D.C.)
- Kyrgyzstan (Washington, D.C.)
- Lebanon (Havana)
- Laos (Havana)
- Malaysia (Caracas)
- Sovereign Military Order of Malta (Miami)
- Netherlands (Port-of-Spain)
- New Zealand (Bridgetown)
- Norway (Bogotá)
- Poland (Bogotá)
- Portugal (Bogotá)
- Palestine (Caracas)
- Pakistan (Washington, D.C.)
- Romania (Caracas)
- Russia (Kingston)
- Slovakia (Havana)
- Saudi Arabia (Caracas)
- Seychelles (New York City)
- South Africa (Kingston)
- South Korea (Port-of-Spain)
- Spain (Port-of-Spain)
- Sweden (Stockholm)
- Switzerland (Caracas)
- Thailand (Ottawa)
- Tajikistan (Washington, D.C.)
- Togo (Washington, D.C.)
- Turkmenistan (Washington, D.C.)
- Turkey (Port-of-Spain)
- United Arab Emirates (Bogotá)
- United States (Bridgetown)
- Uzbekistan (Washington, D.C.)
- Vietnam (Panama City)
- Yemen (Havana)
- Zambia (Washington, D.C.)
- Zimbabwe (Ottawa)

== Former Embassies ==
- China
- Argentina

== See also ==
- Foreign relations of Saint Lucia
- Visa requirements for Saint Lucian citizens
