= .lc =

Internet country code top-level domain for Saint Lucia

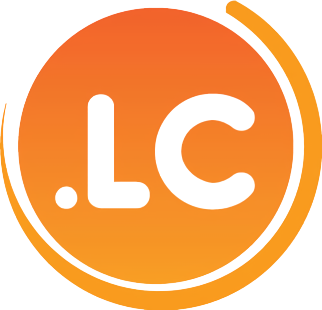
- Introduced: 3 September 1991
- TLD type: Country code top-level domain
- Status: Active
- Registry: NIC.LC
- Sponsor: University of Puerto Rico
- Intended use: Entities connected with Saint Lucia
- Actual use: International including from LLC and PLC, also gets some use in Saint Lucia
- Registration restrictions: None, except for .gov.lc and .edu.lc
- Structure: Registrations are made directly at second level, or at third level beneath several second-level names
- Documents: Policies
- Dispute policies: UDRP
- DNSSEC: yes
- Registry website: www.nic.lc

.lc is the Internet country code top-level domain (ccTLD) for Saint Lucia, sponsored by the University of Puerto Rico and created on September 3, 1991. The registry is operated by Afilias and markets towards companies structured as LCs, LLCs or PLCs due to the possibility of a domain hack, such as CompanyName.L.LC (companyname.l.lc uses the open SLD l.lc) and supposedly better names.

== Second and third level domains ==
Registrations take place directly at the second level or at one of the following third level domains. There are a number of registrars, but .gov.lc and .edu.lc can only be registered at the NIC.

- .co.lc
- .com.lc
- .org.lc (local non-profit organizations get this domain free of charge)
- .net.lc
- .l.lc (domain hack for LLCs)
- .p.lc (domain hack for PLCs)
- .gov.lc (restricted to government departments, agencies, ministries, etc.)
- .edu.lc (restricted to educational institutions)

== Rules ==
All domains must be between 1 and 63 characters long, excluding the TLD. In addition, domains may not contain anything other than letters, numbers, and a hyphen. .lc does not support internationalized domain names, and domain names may not start or end with a hyphen. Domain names considered offensive by the registry may not be registered.
