= Foreign relations of Saint Lucia =

Saint Lucia maintains friendly relations with the major powers active in the Caribbean, including the United States, the United Kingdom, Canada, and France. Saint Lucia has no extant international disputes, aside from tension resulting from the island's status as a transit point for South American drugs destined for the United States and Europe.

Saint Lucia's Permanent Representative (or ambassador) to the United Nations as of February 22, 2017, was Cosmos Richardson, who was still in office as of January 2018.

== History ==
Saint Lucia participated in the American-led invasion of Grenada in 1983, sending members of its Special Services Unit into active duty. It was subsequently one of eight countries to cast a vote against a United Nations General Assembly motion condemning the invasion.

As a member of CARICOM, St. Lucia strongly backed efforts by the United States to implement UN Security Council Resolution 940, designed to restore democracy to Haiti. St. Lucia agreed to contribute personnel to the multinational force which restored the democratically elected government of Haiti in October 1994.

St. Lucia participated along with 14 other Caribbean nations in a summit with US President Bill Clinton in Bridgetown, Barbados, in May 1997. The summit was the first-ever meeting in the region between the U.S. and Caribbean heads of government, and strengthened the basis for regional cooperation on justice and counter-narcotics, finance and development, and trade issues.

== Diplomatic relations ==
List of countries which Saint Lucia established diplomatic relations with:

#	Country	Date
1	United Kingdom	22 February 1979
2	Jamaica	22 February 1979
3	Barbados	23 February 1979
4	Canada	23 February 1979
5	Guyana	23 February 1979
6	South Korea	23 February 1979
7	Mexico	17 May 1979
8	United States	11 June 1979
9	Cuba	23 August 1979
10	North Korea	13 September 1979
11	France	14 September 1979
12	Venezuela	14 September 1979
13	Romania	15 November 1979
14	Argentina	13 December 1979
15	Brazil	21 December 1979
16	Bahamas	1979
17	Dominica	1979
18	Haiti	1979
19	Israel	1979
20	Italy	1979
21	Saint Vincent and the Grenadines	1979
22	Trinidad and Tobago	1979
23	Ecuador	1 January 1980
24	Germany	8 January 1980
25	Japan	11 January 1980
26	Cyprus	24 July 1980
27	Greece	18 November 1980
28	Suriname	18 November 1980
29	Belgium	1980
30	Iraq	1980
31	Netherlands	1980
32	Belize	21 September 1981
33	Sweden	September 1981
34	Australia	17 January 1982
35	India	8 February 1982
36	Colombia	18 March 1982
37	Grenada	6 October 1982
38	Denmark	20 December 1982
39	Bangladesh	12 May 1983
40	Saint Kitts and Nevis	19 September 1983
41	Antigua and Barbuda	1983
—	Republic of China	13 January 1984
42	Oman	28 March 1984
—	Holy See	1 September 1984
43	Peru	1985
44	Spain	2 May 1986
45	Morocco	9 March 1988
46	Seychelles	13 July 1988
47	Dominican Republic	1988
48	Thailand	4 April 1989
49	Uruguay	1 September 1989
50	Chile	21 March 1991
51	Costa Rica	1991
52	Guatemala	1 April 1992
53	Malaysia	9 October 1992
54	Marshall Islands	1992
55	Nicaragua	1992
56	Paraguay	18 June 1993
57	Singapore	15 January 1994
58	Indonesia	2 February 1994
59	El Salvador	2 February 1994
60	Panama	10 July 1995
61	Czech Republic	6 August 1996
62	Portugal	19 September 1996
63	South Africa	12 December 1996
64	Brunei	1996
—	China (suspended)	8 September 1997
65	Croatia	10 December 1997
66	Norway	11 November 1998
—	Sovereign Military Order of Malta	1999
67	Poland	24 May 2000
68	North Macedonia	24 August 2000
69	Belarus	25 August 2000
70	Armenia	17 October 2000
71	Ireland	2000
72	Saudi Arabia	2000
73	Russia	19 April 2004
74	Ethiopia	3 August 2004
75	Austria	2 June 2005
76	Turkey	25 June 2005
77	Slovenia	29 August 2005
78	Tajikistan	5 October 2005
79	Hungary	7 October 2005
80	Iceland	7 May 2006
81	Switzerland	10 June 2006
82	Latvia	21 June 2006
83	Lithuania	19 March 2009
84	Estonia	23 September 2009
85	Finland	23 September 2009
86	Luxembourg	23 September 2009
87	Slovakia	23 September 2009
88	Libya	30 October 2009
89	Georgia	25 February 2010
90	Azerbaijan	11 March 2010
91	Malta	11 March 2010
92	Albania	14 July 2010
93	Egypt	19 July 2010
94	Montenegro	24 September 2010
95	Ukraine	24 September 2010
96	United Arab Emirates	29 November 2010
97	Kuwait	31 January 2011
98	Monaco	12 May 2011
—	Kosovo	19 August 2011
99	Maldives	2 December 2011
100	Kazakhstan	5 December 2012
101	Qatar	1 March 2013
102	Bosnia and Herzegovina	15 April 2013
103	New Zealand	17 May 2013
104	Honduras	5 June 2014
105	Mongolia	27 September 2014
106	Mauritius	7 November 2014
—	State of Palestine	14 September 2015
107	Fiji	27 January 2016
108	Philippines	29 March 2016
109	Vietnam	26 June 2018
110	Gambia	25 September 2018
111	Kiribati	25 September 2018
112	Solomon Islands	25 September 2018
113	Sri Lanka	25 June 2019
114	Bolivia	26 June 2019
115	Nepal	27 August 2019
116	Rwanda	28 August 2019
117	Namibia	29 October 2019
118	Serbia	13 November 2019
119	Kenya	10 December 2019
120	San Marino	7 February 2020
121	Bulgaria	5 November 2020
122	Moldova	3 March 2021
123	Cape Verde	20 September 2022
124	Ivory Coast	22 September 2022
125	Tuvalu	7 December 2022
126	Bahrain	13 December 2022
127	Algeria	19 December 2022
128	Andorra	20 September 2023
129	Kyrgyzstan	20 September 2023
130	Liechtenstein	20 September 2023
131	Sierra Leone	20 September 2023
132	Timor-Leste	8 November 2023
133	Mauritania	5 December 2023
134	Botswana	6 December 2023
135	Samoa	14 December 2023
136	Pakistan	28 May 2024
137	Benin	25 June 2024
138	Mali	26 June 2024
139	Eritrea	16 September 2024
140	Ghana	24 September 2024
141	Nigeria	30 June 2025
142	Uzbekistan	10 September 2025
143	Cambodia	26 September 2025
144	Nauru	16 September 2026
145	Zimbabwe	21 September 2026

== Bilateral relations ==
Country	Formal Relations Began	Notes
France	14 September 1979	See France–Saint Lucia relations: Both countries established diplomatic relations on February 22, 1979.; Saint Lucia has an embassy in Paris; France is accredited to Saint Lucia from its embassy in Castries, Saint Lucia.
India	1982	See India–Saint Lucia relations See also: Indo-Saint Lucian Relations between India and Saint Lucia date back to the mid-19th century when both countries were British colonies. The first Indians in Saint Lucia arrived on 1 May 1857 as indentured workers on board the Palmyra. Thirteen ships transported indentured labourers from India to Saint Lucia in the following decades. The last ship carrying Indian indentured workers, the Volga, arrived on the island on 10 December 1893. In total, nearly 4,500 Indians were brought to Saint Lucia, excluding those who died during the voyage. About 2,075 workers returned to India, while the rest remained in Saint Lucia or emigrated to other Caribbean nations such as Trinidad and Tobago and Guyana. The last indenture contracts expired in 1897, and by the end of the 19th century, Saint Lucia had a population of 2,560 free Indians. Many Indians who had completed their indenture periods were unable to return home as they did not have sufficient funds to do so. The Indians that remained in Saint Lucia are the origin of the Indo-Saint Lucian community. The Embassy of India in Paramaribo, Suriname is concurrently accredited to Saint Lucia. Prime Ministers Narendra Modi and Kenny D. Anthony held bilateral discussions on the sidelines of UN General Assembly in New York on 25 September 2015. Minister of Skill Development and Entrepreneurship Rajiv Pratap Rudy made a visit to Saint Lucia on 3–6 October 2016. Rudy held bilateral talks with Acting Prime Minister Guy Joseph, Minister of External Affairs Sarah Beaubrun Flood, Senator Hermanglid Francis, the Minister for Home Affairs, Justice and National Security, the Minister of Commerce, Industrialists, Diaspora Associations, Academicians and other senior Saint Lucian government officials. Indo-Saint Lucians or Indian Saint Lucians are Saint Lucians of Indian ancestry, descended from the Indians who came to Saint Lucia in the 19th century as indentured workers. As of 2013, people of Indian descent are a minority ethnic group in the country, accounting for 2.4% of the country's population. An additional 11.9% of the country is multiracial, predominantly of Indian and African descent. They have completely assimilated with the local population and have little familiarity with Indian culture. Some Indo-Saint Lucians have held high offices such as Cabinet Ministers. As of December 2016, around 250 Indian citizens reside in Saint Lucia. Most members of the community are doctors and other professionals, while a few are businessmen engaged in imports, trading and running duty-free shops.
Mexico	17 May 1979	See Mexico–Saint Lucia relations: Mexico has an embassy in Castries.; Saint Lucia is accredited to Mexico from its embassy in Washington, D.C., United States.
Trinidad and Tobago	22 February 1979	See Saint Lucia-Trinidad and Tobago relations: Trinidad and Tobago has a consulate in Basseterre
Taiwan	7 May 1984, severed 29 August 1997, Restored 30 April 2007	St. Lucia had official diplomatic relations with the Republic of China (Taiwan) for about 13 years, but switched recognition to the People's Republic of China (PRC) in 1997. On 25 April 2007, the Premier of the Republic of China Su Tseng-chang, announced that St. Lucia and the ROC would resume formal diplomatic relations. On 1 May 2007, St. Lucia regained diplomatic relations with the Republic of China (Taiwan). Within a few days, the People's Republic of China suspended diplomatic relations. On 4 June 2015, St. Lucia opened its embassy in Taipei, its first embassy in Asia.
Turkey	25 May 2005	See Saint Lucia–Turkey relations: Turkish Embassy in Port of Spain is accredited to St. Lucia.; Trade volume between the two countries was 3 million USD in 2019.
United Kingdom	1979	See Saint Lucia–United Kingdom relations British Foreign Secretary William Hague with Saint Lucian Prime Minister Stephenson King in Lancaster House, April 2011. Saint Lucia established diplomatic relations with the United Kingdom in 22 February 1979. Both countries are Commonwealth Realms.: Saint Lucia maintains a high commission in London.; The United Kingdom is accredited to its high commission in Castries.; The UK governed Saint Lucia from 1803 to 1979, when Saint Lucia achieved full independence. Both countries share common membership of the Commonwealth; they are both parties of the CARIFORUM–UK Economic Partnership Agreement. Bilaterally the two countries have an Investment Agreement.
United States	11 June 1979	See Saint Lucia–United States relations: Saint Lucia has an embassy in Washington, D.C.; United States is accredited to Saint Lucia from its embassy in Bridgetown, Barbados.

== See also ==
- List of diplomatic missions in Saint Lucia
- List of diplomatic missions of Saint Lucia
- Visa requirements for Saint Lucian citizens
