= Indo–Saint Lucians =

Residents of Saint Lucia of Indian ancestry

Indo-Saint Lucians
Total population
- Approx. 3,000

Regions with significant populations
- Saint Lucia (Approx. 3,000)

Languages
- English, Saint Lucian Creole French, Hindustani

Religion
- Hinduism, Christianity, Islam, Sikhism

Related ethnic groups
- Indo-Caribbeans

Indo–Saint Lucians or Indian–Saint Lucians, are Saint Lucians whose ancestry lies within the country of India, primarily from the Bhojpur and Awadh regions in the modern-day Indian states of Bihar, Jharkhand and Uttar Pradesh in Northern India. In 1859, the British began transporting indentured workers from British India to work on plantation estates in Saint Lucia, which had become a British colony in 1814. The first ship carrying 318 indentured workers from India, the Palmyra, arrived in Saint Lucia on 6 May 1859, and the last ship carrying Indian indentured workers, the Volga, arrived on 10 December 1893.

In total, 13 ships transported nearly 4,500 Indian indentured workers to Saint Lucia between 1859 and 1893, excluding those who died during the voyage. About 2,075 workers returned to India, while the rest remained in Saint Lucia or emigrated to other Caribbean nations such as Trinidad and Tobago and Guyana. The last indenture contracts expired in 1897, and by the end of the 19th century, Saint Lucia had a population of 2,560 free Indians. Many Indians who had completed their indenture periods were unable to return home as they did not have sufficient funds to do so. The Indians that remained in Saint Lucia are the origin of the Indo-Saint Lucian community.

As of 2013, people of Indian descent are a minority ethnic group in Saint Lucia, accounting for 2.4% of the country's population. An additional 11.9% of the country is multiracial, predominantly of Indian and African descent.

== History ==
European colonialists established sugarcane plantations in the West Indies in the 17th century using African slave labour. Following the abolition of slavery in British West Indian colonies in 1838, plantation owners in the region sought to find alternate sources of labour. In 1859, the British began transporting indentured workers from India to work on plantation estates in Saint Lucia, which had become a British colony in 1814.

Most of the workers came from rural areas of the modern-day Indian states of Bihar, Jharkhand and Uttar Pradesh. In India, they had been agricultural labourers and small farmers. Most of them belonged to lower castes and were poor, however, they were not the poorest people in their native villages. The majority of them owned cattle and property in India. They emigrated to the West Indies primarily for economic reasons, intending to make money there and return to India with their savings. Others, in particular the female indentured workers, saw the work as a "vehicle for emancipation" believing that their indenture period was a path to attaining personal and economic freedom. Nearly two-thirds of all indentured Indian women were widows, former prostitutes, single mothers, or had been deserted by their husbands or had run away from unhappy marriages. The conditions of the Indian workers on plantation estates was poor, and on average, 25-30% of all workers suffered from malaria or spleen disease at any given point of time. The first Indian settlements in Saint Lucia were established near the sugar estates where they worked namely, Pierrot, Augier, Belle Vue and Cacao around the Vieux Fort factory; La Caye and Dennery near the Dennery factory; Marc and Forestiere near the Cul-de-Sac factory, and Anse La Raye near the Roseau factory. A small Indian village also came up in Balca, near to Balenbouche estate.

The first ship carrying 318 indentured workers from India, the Palmyra, arrived in Saint Lucia on 6 May 1859. This group was indentured for a period of three years, and most were re-indentured in 1864. Not much is known about the conditions under which workers were re-indentured or had their contracts extended. The next ship, the Francis Ridley brought 261 Indian workers in June 1857. This group was also re-indentured in 1864. More Indian workers arrived on the island in 1860. The Victor Emmanuel brought 367-393 workers to Saint Lucia on 15 February and the Zemindar carried 293-316 workers on 10 April 1860. The indenture period of the Indians brought on board these two ships ended in 1863, but all of them were re-indentured. There were an estimated 1,215 Indian indentured workers in Saint Lucia by the end of 1860, of whom 242 died by the end of 1861. At least one Indian worker was reported to have absconded from Saint Lucia. British Colonial Administrator Breen of Saint Lucia attributed the high mortality rate to the poor conditions provided to workers on the Roseaux Valley estates owned by William Muter. The birth of 50 Indian children on the island brought the total Indian population in the country to 1,202 by the end of 1861. The Ulysses transported 287-320 Indians from Calcutta and arrived in Saint Lucia in February 1862. The population of Indians on the islands reached 1,463 by the end of 1862. A new hospital system for indentured workers was established in 1862, after the high mortality rates under the previous system of medical care. Saint Lucia had 1,304 and 1,325 Indians by the end of 1863 and 1864 respectively.

The Indian workers who had arrived aboard the Victor Emmanuel and the Zemindar completed their five-year indenture period by the end of 1865. The Indians who arrived on board the Palmyra completed their indenture period in May 1857. Per the terms of their contract, they could choose to avail a free passage to India or could receive a free grant of land from the colonial Governor of Saint Lucia. The Indian population totaled 1,207, of whom only 251 were still indentured by the end of 1867. Only the Indian workers that had arrived on board the Ulysses had not completed their indenture period. The majority of the Indian workers who had completed their indenture period requested to return to India. However, the Governor of Saint Lucia wanted them to remain in Saint Lucia and offered cash in exchange for forfeiting the right to return. Four hundred Indians took up the Governor's offer, while 230 officially registered to return to India by the end of 1867. 451 Indians returned to India aboard the Ganges at the end of that year, and 298 returned on board the Lincelles in November 1868. The Lincelles voyage cost the British colonial government £3,600 (equivalent to £176,667 in 2025). The government also spent £3,097 (equivalent to £302,789 in 2025) to pay 425 Indians who had chosen to forfeit their right of return. 162 Indians returned to India in January 1870.

Around 1,500 Indian indentured workers arrived in Saint Lucia between 1859 and 1869, of whom only 300 remained on the island. The majority of Indians who forfeited their right of return to India, chose to use the cash they received from the Governor to emigrate to other Caribbean nations, particularly those with large Indian populations. The exodus of Indians from the island caused labour shortages for plantation estates that were heavily dependent on Indian labour. Fearing that some estates may collapse, the government introduced a new scheme to persuade Indians to remain in Saint Lucia in 1870. Under the new policy, Indian workers (and their children) would be entitled to a free return voyage to India if they agreed to remain in Saint Lucia for at least 3 years, register with authorities periodically, and only pursue agricultural occupations. By 1870, plantation owners were successful in replacing some of the Indian workforce with Barbadians. The Harkaway transported 162 Indians back to India in 1871. This was the last group of Indians entitled to free return.

Illness resulted in a large group of Indians, around 340, being admitted to hospitals in 1878. In April of the same year, 580 Indian workers arrived in Saint Lucia aboard the Lucindas to help replace the ill workers. The Chetah, Foyle and Bann brought 221, 67, and 316 workers to the country in 1879, 1880, and 1881 respectively. The Jamuna returned 95 people back to India in 1883. Between 1881 and 1883, Saint Lucia was unable to obtain Indian labourers due to competition from larger Caribbean countries, and considered importing Chinese workers instead. Saint Lucia was able to obtain 626 Indians workers on board the Bracadille in 1884. However, the ship, which had departed from Calcutta, had to be quarantined on arrival due to a cholera outbreak on board. This in turn resulted in some neighbouring countries quarantining Saint Lucia. Many of the Indians on board the Bracadille were admitted to Saint Lucian hospitals the following year, and they were deemed to be in the poorest physical state of any Indian workers that had come to the island. The Poonah transported 306 Indian indenture workers to Saint Lucia in 1885.

A Canadian Presbyterian Mission to Indian immigrants in Trinidad established three schools for Indian children in Saint Lucia in 1887. Creole children were also enrolled in the schools. The Moy, Rone, and Hereford returned 327, 132, and 21 Indians back to India in 1888, 1889, and 1890 respectively. In 1889 or 1890, the Victoria Hospital treated 1,301 Indians for various illnesses. The SS Roumania brought 554 Indians to Saint Lucia on 31 March 1891. The ship sailed from Calcutta via the Suez Canal making it the first ship to transport immigrants to the West Indies via that route. The SS Roumania had 309 male and 126 female adults, 7 children, 105 infants on board. Three births and five deaths occurred during the voyage, and one birth and one death occurred at the Castries harbour before the passengers had disembarked. Most of the passengers, particularly the children, were malnourished and had to be admitted to the hospital directly. A further 19 children and 3 adults would die at the hospital.

By the end of 1891, Saint Lucia had an Indian population of 2,523 Indians – 1,849 Hindus, 475 Christians, and 199 Muslims. Indian workers who had been brought to Saint Lucia in 1881 and had completed their indenture period were unable to avail their right of return to India in 1891 because the colonial government failed to procure any transportation for them. However, the government reserved a 627-acre plot of land near the Castries to establish a settlement for Indians. The government sold 5 to 10 acres of land to each Indian at a cost of about £1 (equivalent to £110 in 2025) per acre payable in installments over a five-year period. Administrator in Chief V. Skipton Gouldsbury noted, "I hope to be able before long to establish the nucleus of another Indian coolie settlement in the neighborhood of Vieux Fort at the south end of the island, and am having lands surveyed in that locality for that purpose." Indians that remained in Saint Lucia began investing in the country in 1891. They made large deposits in savings banks, purchased livestock, and some bought property in the Castries region. The country had 5 schools catering to Indian children by the end of 1891.

The Jumna returned 137–139 workers who had completed their indenture period back to India in August 1892. The workers also received a total of £2,138 (equivalent to £234,864 in 2025) in cash. Colonial authorities closed the Indian school located at the Central Factory Estate at the end of 1892, re-opened it in February 1893, before closing it permanently in October 1893. A colonial government record from 1893 also noted that Indians who were absent from plantations estates without leave or those who refused work could face imprisonment.

The last ship carrying indentured Indian immigrants, the Volga, departed Calcutta with 730 Indians on board – 554 adults, 395 males and 159 females. The vessel arrived off the coast of Castries harbour on the night of 10 December 1893. However, the ship ran aground at the Vigie Point, then capsized and sank. Fortunately, the limited wind and a comparatively smooth sea allowed the ship's lifeboats and people at the shore to rescue all passengers. Only 156 of the ship's passengers remained in Saint Lucia, as the remaining were scheduled to be transported to Jamaica. 487 Indians sailed for Jamaica aboard the Jumna on 22 December 1893. The remains of the Volga are believed to lie at the bottom of a cove in the Vigie Peninsula. The cove is known as "tou deewee", meaning "rice hole" in French Creole, because oral accounts of the ship stated that it was carrying bags of rice, some of which reportedly washed on shore. All of the Indians who arrived on the SS Roumania and the Volga had to remain in Saint Lucia because they did not have sufficient funds to return to India, and the fund set up by the colonial government to repatriate Indian workers had no money left.

The British Peer returned 450 immigrants, including 40 children, to India in September 1894. They received a total of £2,989 (equivalent to £335,896 in 2025) from the colonial government. At the end of 1894, 889 Indian workers completed their indenture period. Of these workers, 317 accepted the government's scheme to remain in the country, while 36 remained in the country without claiming compensation from the government. 708 Indians remained indentured in Saint Lucia at the end of 1894, and 721 the following year. Four Indian schools functioned in Saint Lucia with a total of 233 students in 1894 and 211 in 1895. At the end of 1896, 149 Indians remained indentured in the country.

In total, 13 ships transported 4,354 Indian indentured workers to Saint Lucia between 1859 and 1893, excluding those who died during the voyage. About 2,075 workers returned to India, while the rest remained in Saint Lucia or emigrated to other Caribbean nations such as Trinidad and Tobago and Guyana. The last indenture contracts expired in 1897, and by the end of the 19th century, Saint Lucia had a population of 2,560 free Indians. Many Indians who had completed their indenture periods were unable to return home as they did not have sufficient funds to do so. The Indians that remained in Saint Lucia are the origin of the Indo-Saint Lucian community.

== Indian Arrival Day ==
The Indian Diaspora of St. Lucia, an association promoting Indo-Saint Lucian heritage, organized the first Indian Arrival Day celebrations in Saint Lucia on 6 May 2013. The association is campaigning for the Saint Lucian government to officially declare 6 May as Indian Arrival Day. Many other Caribbean nations observe Indian Arrival Day annually to commemorate the date when the first Indians arrived in their respective countries.

== See also ==
- India–Saint Lucia relations
- Dougla
- Afro–Saint Lucians
