= Afro–Saint Lucians =

Saint Lucians of West African descent

Afro-Saint Lucians
- (Saint Lucia)

Total population
- Approx. 134,294

Regions with significant populations
- Saint Lucia (Approx. 134,294)

Languages
- English, Saint Lucian Creole French

Religion
- Christianity, Kélé

Related ethnic groups
- Caribbean

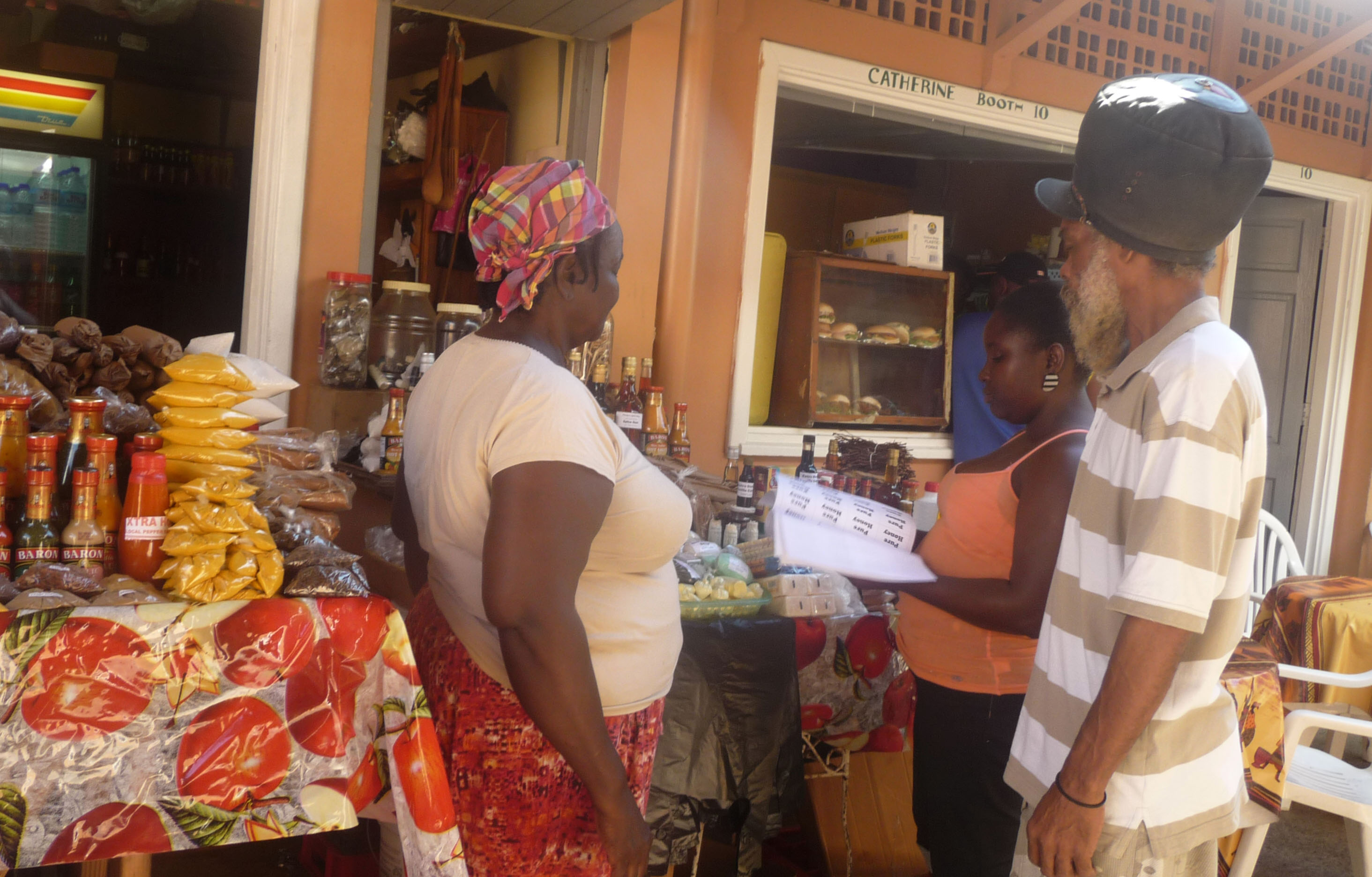
Afro-Saint Lucians at Castries Market

Afro–Saint Lucians or West African-Saint Lucians, are Saint Lucians whose ancestry lies within West and Central Africa. However, many Afro–Saint Lucians also have small amounts of other ancestry such as Arawak, European and Indian.

As of 2013, people of West and Central African descent are the majority in Saint Lucia, accounting for 82.5% of the country's population. An additional 11.9% of the country is multiracial, predominantly of Afro-European descent (mixture of various West and Central African ethnic groups and European groups) and Afro-Indian descent (mixture of African and Indian/South Asian).

== Origins ==
H. H. Breen, one of the earliest writers to write a detailed study of Saint Lucia, noted during his period little was known about the Island In its early French colonial period, the Bantu slave population were imported from Martinique, or, during bouts of British rule, supplemented by slaves from Barbados. This dominance of Martinique merchants in monopolising the slave imports into the Island has raised the reasonable inference, supported statistically, that most slaves shared a common origin from the Senegambian coast. According to Dalphinis, the majority of slaves from 1695 onwards were indisputably from the Senegambia, comprising mainly Wolof and Mandingo ethnic groups. As a British possession, however, at the end of the eighteenth century, Saint Lucia increasingly imported large numbers of slaves from Akan and Igbo groups.

Consequently, the slave population, diverse but distinct, is shaped over the course of two centuries by Senegambian slaves (including slaves from the Malian hinterland, Fulani, Dyula, Bambara etc.) and Akan (Gold Coast slaves) and Igbo slaves (Bight of Biafra: roughly 3,000 slaves, or 53% of the slaves enter Saint Lucia before the end of Slavery). As to Yoruba, they constitute a strong cultural influence on the Island. In many areas, their cultural impact has left the strongest legacy since many Yoruba came as 'indentured servants' after 1807, introducing the Kele and Ogun ritual rites. Also present in big numbers were the Ambundus Central Africans slaves (more of 1,000 slaves, or 22%)., along with the Kongos.

Between 1600 and 1700, most of the slaves, as noted, came from Senegambia. These slaves were mainly used as servants. Meanwhile, Ewe and Fon slaves, from the Slave Coast, exerted as rural slaves

Of the African-born slave population in 1815, the Igbo were the most numerous, making up 894 people. The second largest group were the Kongo people, who numbered 574 people.

The ethno-linguistic dominance of specific groups in certain areas of work, had a great importance in the origin of Creole identity

== History ==
In 1763, when the British acquired the island by the Treaty of Paris, they imported enslaved Africans as workers. Caribbean conditions were harsh, and many African slaves, like the Caribs (also used as slaves in the island), died, requiring continued importation of new captives. The British continued to import slaves until they abolished the trade in 1808. By that time, people of ethnic African and less so Carib descent greatly outnumbered those of ethnic European background.

On 21 February 1795, an army of French and African freedom fighters led by Goyrand defeated a battalion of British troops. For the next four months, a united front of recently freed slaves and freedom fighters known as the Brigands (also ex-slaves, who instigated revolt across the region) forced out not only the British army, but many of the slaveholders who had been loyal to the British. Just under a year later, the British Army returned, with many more troops than the freedom fighters could manage, and eventually re-imposed slavery until 1807, when the African slave trade was abolished (although it was not until 1834 that they abolished the institution of slavery).

In 1814, the British regained control of the island, many of those freed had escaped into the thick rain forests.

Even after abolition, all former slaves had to serve a four-year "apprenticeship" which forced them to work for free for their former masters for at least three-quarters of the work week. They achieved full freedom in 1838.

== Demography and culture ==
The culture of Saint Lucia has been influenced by African, Arawak, Carib, East Indian, French and British heritage. One of the secondary languages is a Creole, a form of French patois.

=== Languages ===
The official language is English; The official language spoken in Saint Lucia is English although many Saint Lucians also speak a French dialect, Creole (Kwéyòl). The Saint Lucian Creole French (Kwéyòl), which is a French-based Creole colloquially referred to as "Patwah" (Patois), is spoken by 95% of the population. This Antillean Creole is used in literature and music, and is gaining official acknowledgement. It is derived chiefly from French and African languages, with some vocabulary from Carib and other sources. Saint Lucian Creole is related to Haitian Creole that both languages are French-based creole.

=== Music ===
The Bèlè music type, characteristic of Saint Lucia, Dominica and Martinique is probably of Dahomeyan origin.

=== Cuisine ===
The island's cuisine is a unique blend of Indigenous Carib, African, European (mainly British and French) and East Indian cuisine; this creates dynamic meal dishes such as bouillon, hearty soups packed full with fresh locally produced vegetables, hearty fish broths or fish water, pelau, green fig, breadfruit, saltfish and other combinations. Saint Lucian cuisine is similar to that of many other commonwealth Caribbean nations such as Dominica, neighbouring St. Vincent and the Grenadines and Trinidad. Typical essential foodstuffs are potatoes, onions, celery, thyme, coconut milk, cassava, flour and cornmeal. All mainstream meat and poultry are eaten in Saint Lucia; meat and seafood are normally stewed and browned to create a rich gravy sometimes served over ground provisions or rice. Due to Saint Lucia's small Indo-Caribbean population curry is very popular, however due to the blend of between cooking styles curry dishes have a distant Caribbean twist to it. Roti, a flatbread of Indian origin, has become very popular and is typically served in households or as a quick meal to go.

== See also ==
- Indo-Saint Lucian
