= Kélé =

Afro-Saint Lucian religion in Nigeria

Kélé is an Afro-Saint Lucian religion, originated from the Djiné people of the Babonneau region. Its primary deities are Ogun, Shango and Eshu. Kélé ceremonies include the drumming of the tanbou manman (mother drum) and the tanbou ich (child drum) of the Batá drum family. The religion has its origins in African slaves of the Babonneau region. The religion is strongly connected to the Ogun festival in Nigeria. Repressed by the Roman Catholic church until the early 1960s, it had been practiced in secrecy underground. The ritual includes the display of smooth stones (one of Shango's worship items) and iron or steel items in honor of Ogun. The faith itself is believed by some scholars to be a Saint Lucian version of Yoruba religion.

== Name ==
The name Kélé comes from the word ikele, which refers to the circular red or white beads worn around the neck by Yoruba Shango devotees in Nigeria. The religion is also sometimes referred to as "Chango."

== History ==
Kélé was introduced to Saint Lucia by enslaved Yoruba speakers. It was banned by colonial authorities in Saint Lucia.
