= Saint Lucia–United States relations =

- Saint Lucia: United States

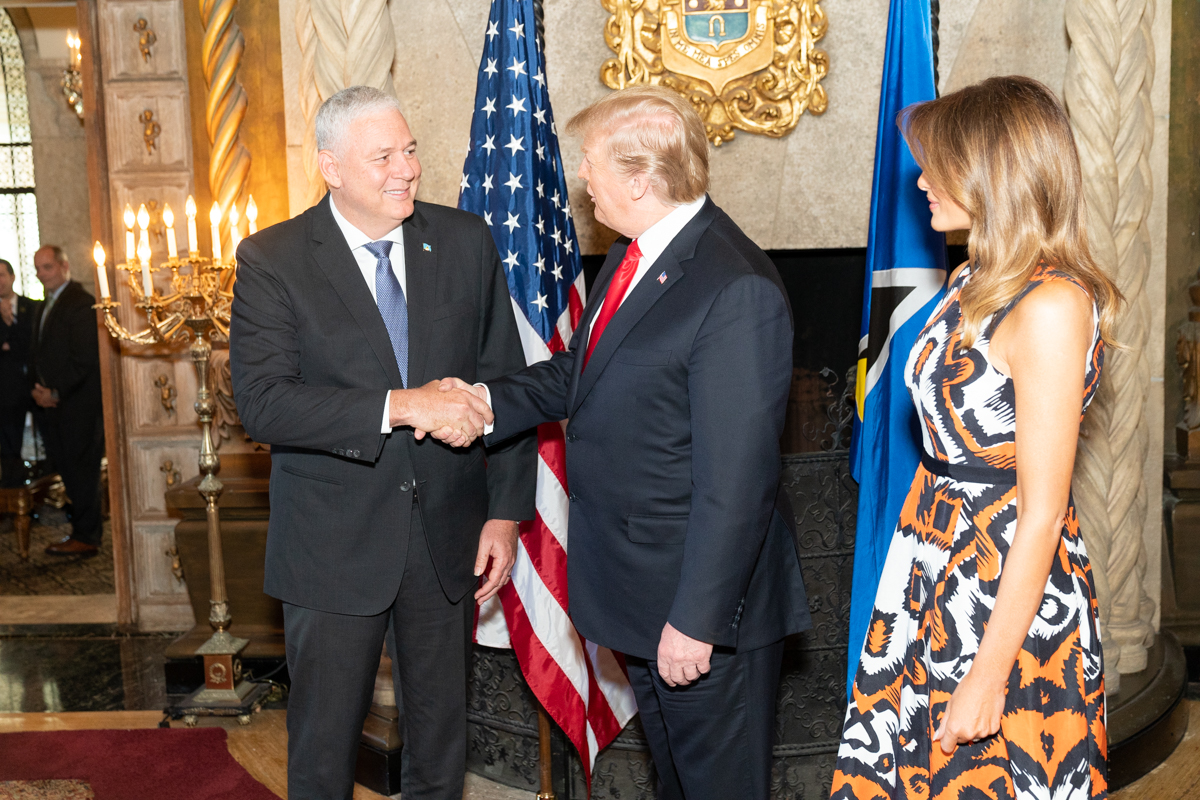
U.S. President Donald Trump and First Lady Melania Trump meet with Saint Lucian Prime Minister Allen Chastanet in Palm Beach, Florida in March 2019

Saint Lucia–United States relations are bilateral relations between Saint Lucia and the United States. Roger F. Nyhus is the U.S. Ambassador to St. Lucia.

== History ==
The United States supports the St. Lucian government's efforts to expand its economic base. The Government of St. Lucia has cooperated with the United States on security concerns. U.S. assistance is primarily channeled through multilateral agencies, such as the World Bank, and the USAID office in Bridgetown, Barbados. The Peace Corps, whose Eastern Caribbean regional headquarters is located in St. Lucia, has 22 volunteers in St. Lucia, working primarily in business development, education, and health. U.S. security assistance programs provide limited training to the paramilitary Special Services Unit and the Coast Guard. In addition, St. Lucia receives U.S. counter-narcotics assistance and benefits from U.S. military exercises and humanitarian civic action construction projects.

St. Lucia and the United States share interest in combating international crime and narcotics trafficking. St. Lucia is an appealing transit point for traffickers because of its location. The two governments have concluded various bilateral treaties, including a maritime law enforcement agreement (subsequently amended to include overflight and order-to-land provisions), a mutual legal assistance treaty, and an extradition treaty.

More Americans visit St. Lucia than any other national group. In 2005, tourist visitors totaled over 700,000, mainly from the United States, the United Kingdom, and CARICOM. Cruise ship arrivals in 2005 were down by 18% over 2004, while the number of stay-over visitors increased slightly in the same period.

== Diplomatic missions ==
- Saint Lucia has an embassy in Washington, D.C..
- United States is accredited to Saint Lucia from its embassy in Bridgetown, Barbados.

== See also ==
- North American Union
- North American Free Trade Agreement
- Free Trade Area of the Americas
- Third Border Initiative
- Caribbean Community
- Caribbean Basin Initiative (CBI)
- Caribbean Basin Trade Partnership Act
- Western Hemisphere Travel Initiative
- Foreign relations of Saint Lucia
- Foreign relations of the United States
