= San Miguel Creole =

Dialect of Lesser Antillean French Creole

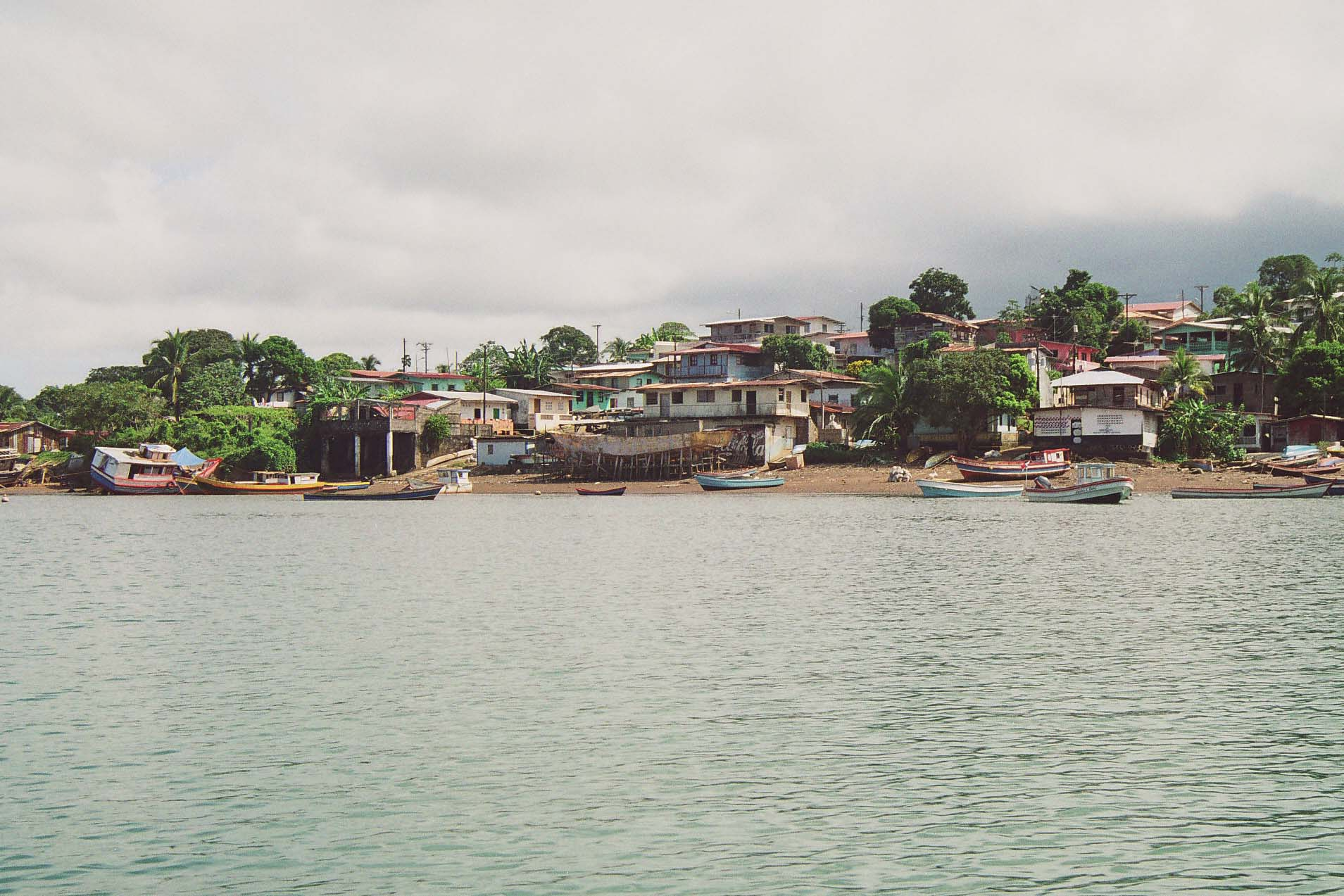
- San Miguel, Panama, where Creole was spoken as well as other parts of Panama
- Region: San Miguel, Colon
- Native speakers: St Lucians, Martiniquais
- Language family: Creole: San Miguel Creole
- Early form: Lesser Antillean French Creole

Language codes
- ISO 639-3: scf
- Glottolog: sanm1305
- ELP: San Miguel Creole French

San Miguel Creole (otherwise known as Panamanian French Creole/Patua) is a dialect of Lesser Antillean French Creole spoken by the descendants of St Lucians and Martiniquais who emigrated to Panama (specifically the town of San Miguel and Colon) in the 19th century. They came over as construction workers on the Panama Canal. There is very little information on the language and therefore it is likely an extinct language in Panama (although some sources claim that there are a few who speak the language, mainly older people in the city of Colon: Lee, writing in 2017, stated there were 3 speakers, Snow, writing in 2005, said it was "nearly extinct"). There probably are remnants in local elder communities of the language, probably words and phrases, however the language is considered lost and extinct by most, with no sources on the vocabulary (although it can be reconstructed using its parent language Saint Lucian Creole).

== See also ==
- Kokoy
- Grenadian French Creole
- Trinidadian French Creole
