= India–Saint Lucia relations =

- India: Saint Lucia

India–Saint Lucia relations refers to the international relations that exist between India and Saint Lucia. The Embassy of India in Paramaribo, Suriname is concurrently accredited to Saint Lucia.

== History ==
Relations between India and Saint Lucia date back to the mid-19th century when both countries were British colonies. The first Indians in Saint Lucia arrived on 6 May 1859 as indentured workers on board the Palmyra. Thirteen ships transported indentured labourers from India to Saint Lucia in the following decades. The last ship carrying Indian indentured workers, the Volga, arrived on the island on 10 December 1893.

In total, nearly 4,500 Indians were brought to Saint Lucia, excluding those who died during the voyage. About 2,075 workers returned to India, while the rest remained in Saint Lucia or emigrated to other Caribbean nations such as Trinidad and Tobago and Guyana. The last indenture contracts expired in 1897, and by the end of the 19th century, Saint Lucia had a population of 2,560 free Indians. Many who had completed their indenture periods were unable to return home due to a lack of sufficient funds, and those who remained became the foundation of the Indo-Saint Lucian community.

Prime Ministers Narendra Modi and Kenny D. Anthony held bilateral discussions on the sidelines of UN General Assembly in New York on 25 September 2015. Minister of Skill Development and Entrepreneurship Rajiv Pratap Rudy made a visit to Saint Lucia on 3–6 October 2016. Rudy held bilateral talks with Acting Prime Minister Guy Joseph, Minister of External Affairs Sarah Beaubrun Flood, Senator Hermanglid Francis, the Minister for Home Affairs, Justice and National Security, the Minister of Commerce, Industrialists, Diaspora Associations, Academicians and other senior Saint Lucian government officials.

== Trade ==
Bilateral trade between India and Saint Lucia totaled US$3.12 million in 2015–16, marking a 21% increase over the previous fiscal year. India exported $2.67 million worth of goods to Saint Lucia and imported $450,000. The main exports from India included vehicles, pharmaceuticals, iron and steel, and textiles, while the primary imports from Saint Lucia were aluminum and iron scrap.

== Foreign aid ==
India provided assistance for the reconstruction of the St Jude Hospital in Saint Lucia in 2010. India donated $500,000 for disaster relief in the aftermath of Hurricane Tomas in December 2010, and the same amount following flash floods in Saint Lucia in December 2013. Citizens of Saint Lucia are eligible for scholarships under the Indian Technical and Economic Cooperation Programme and the Indian Council for Cultural Relations.

== Indians in Saint Lucia ==
Indo-Saint Lucians or Indian Saint Lucians are Saint Lucians of Indian ancestry, descended from the Indians who came to Saint Lucia in the 19th century as indentured workers. The Indian Diaspora of St. Lucia, an association promoting Indo-Saint Lucian heritage, organized the first Indian Arrival Day celebrations in Saint Lucia on 6 May 2013. The association is campaigning for the Saint Lucian government to officially declare 6 May as Indian Arrival Day.

As of 2013, people of Indian descent are a minority ethnic group in the country, accounting for 2.4% of the country's population. An additional 11.9% of the country is multiracial, predominantly of Indian and African descent. They have completely assimilated with the local population and have little familiarity with Indian culture. Some Indo-Saint Lucians have held high offices such as Cabinet Ministers. Additionally, most of the faculty and students at three offshore campuses of medical colleges in Saint Lucia are Indian Americans and Indo-Canadians. As of December 2016, around 250 Indian citizens reside in Saint Lucia. Most members of the community are doctors and other professionals, while a few are businessmen engaged in imports, trading and running duty-free shops.
