= Roseau, Saint Lucia =

Roseau
- Location in Saint Lucia
- Coordinates: 13.95156°N 61.03815°W
- Country: Saint Lucia
- Quarter: Anse la Raye

Roseau is a community on the island of Saint Lucia; it is located on the western side of the island, south of Marigot.
