= Saint Lucia–Trinidad and Tobago relations =

Saint Lucian-Trinidadian relations
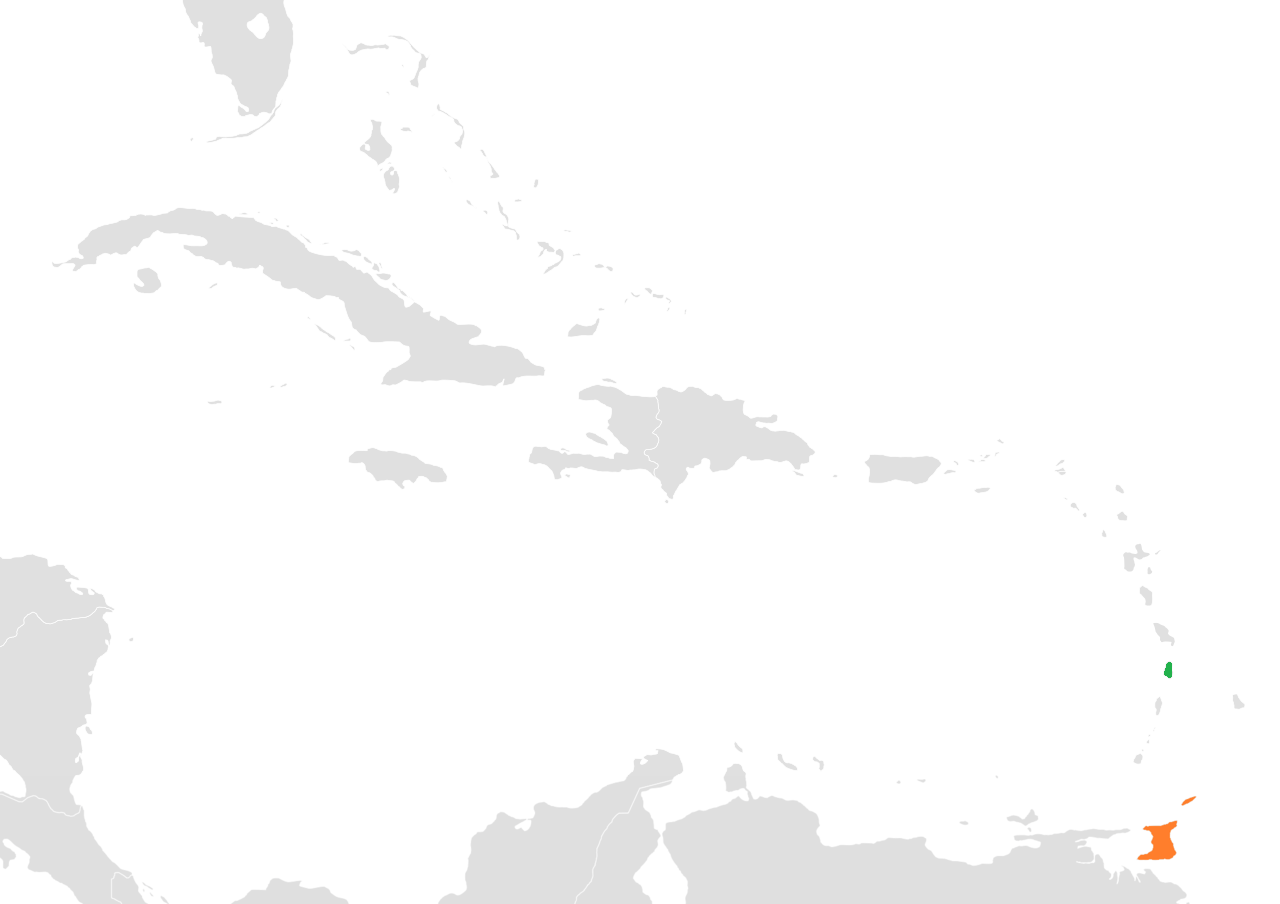

- Saint Lucia: Trinidad and Tobago

Saint Lucia–Trinidad and Tobago relations refers to the bilateral relations between Saint Lucia and Trinidad and Tobago. Trinidad and Tobago maintains a consulate in Castries.

== History ==
Saint Lucia and T&T are both a part of the Commonwealth of Nations, CARICOM and the Organization of American States. In 2018, Saint Lucia started their summer festival in Trinidad due to Trinidad sending the most tourists to Saint Lucia's Summer Festival.

== Trade ==
Several business owners in Saint Lucia have wanted a complete ban on certain Trinidadian products such as soft drinks due to their threat to indigenous business.

== Sports ==
Both countries are part of the multi-national West Indies cricket team, with players from both countries representing the board.
