= Mexico–Saint Lucia relations =

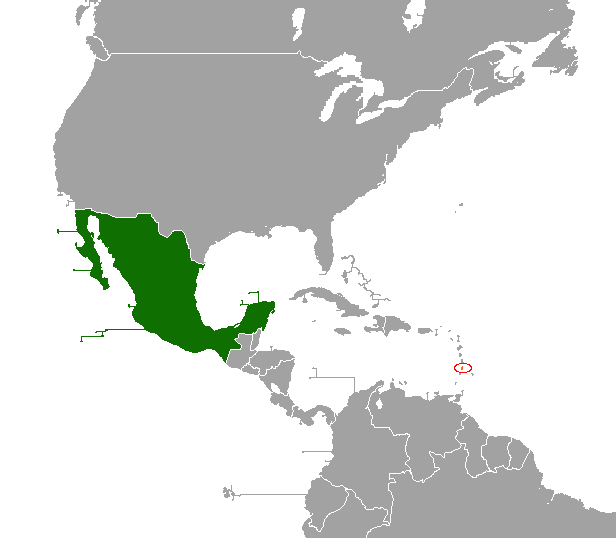

- Mexico: Saint Lucia

The nations of Mexico and Saint Lucia established diplomatic relations in 1979. Both nations are members of the Association of Caribbean States, Community of Latin American and Caribbean States, Organization of American States and the United Nations.

== History ==
Mexico and Saint Lucia established diplomatic relations on 17 May 1979. Relations between both nations have normally taken place in multilateral forums such as the United Nations. In 1981, Santa Lucia became host to the Organisation of Eastern Caribbean States (OECS). In 2005, Mexico opened a resident embassy in Castries which is accredited to the OECS and other eastern Caribbean nations.

In November 2010, Saint Lucian Prime Minister Stephenson King paid a visit to Mexico to attend the 2010 United Nations Climate Change Conference held in Cancún. In 2013, Saint Lucia suffered heavily from Tropical Storm Chantal. In February 2014, Mexican Foreign Minister José Antonio Meade paid a visit to Saint Lucia. During the visit, Mexico donated US$500,000 toward the rebuilding effort of the country and Mexico pledged to rebuild St. Jude's Hospital in Castries. In November 2016, Mexican Foreign Undersecretary Socorro Flores Liera paid a visit to Saint Lucia to inaugurate the completed St. Jude's Hospital in Castries.

In October 2017, Saint Lucian Prime Minister Allen Chastanet paid an official visit to Mexico City. While in Mexico, Prime Minister Chastanet met with Mexican President Enrique Peña Nieto and both leaders discussed possible bilateral cooperation programs, with a focus on technical, scientific, educational and infrastructure fields, as well as in issues such as climate change, commercial facilitation and comprehensive risk management. In March 2018, Mexican Foreign Minister Luis Videgaray Caso paid a visit to Saint Lucia and met with Prime Minister Chastanet. During the visit, Foreign Minister Videgaray and Prime Minister Chastanet participated in the handing-over ceremony of Phase One of the Dennery North Water Treatment System, for which Mexico provided $13.5 million East Caribbean Dollar, through the Infrastructure Fund for Countries of Mesoamerica and the Caribbean (Yucatán Fund).

In 2021, Saint Lucian Prime Minister Philip J. Pierre paid a visit to Mexico City to attend the Community of Latin American and Caribbean States. In October 2024, Prime Minister Pierre travelled to Mexico to attend the inauguration of President Claudia Sheinbaum.

== High-level visits ==
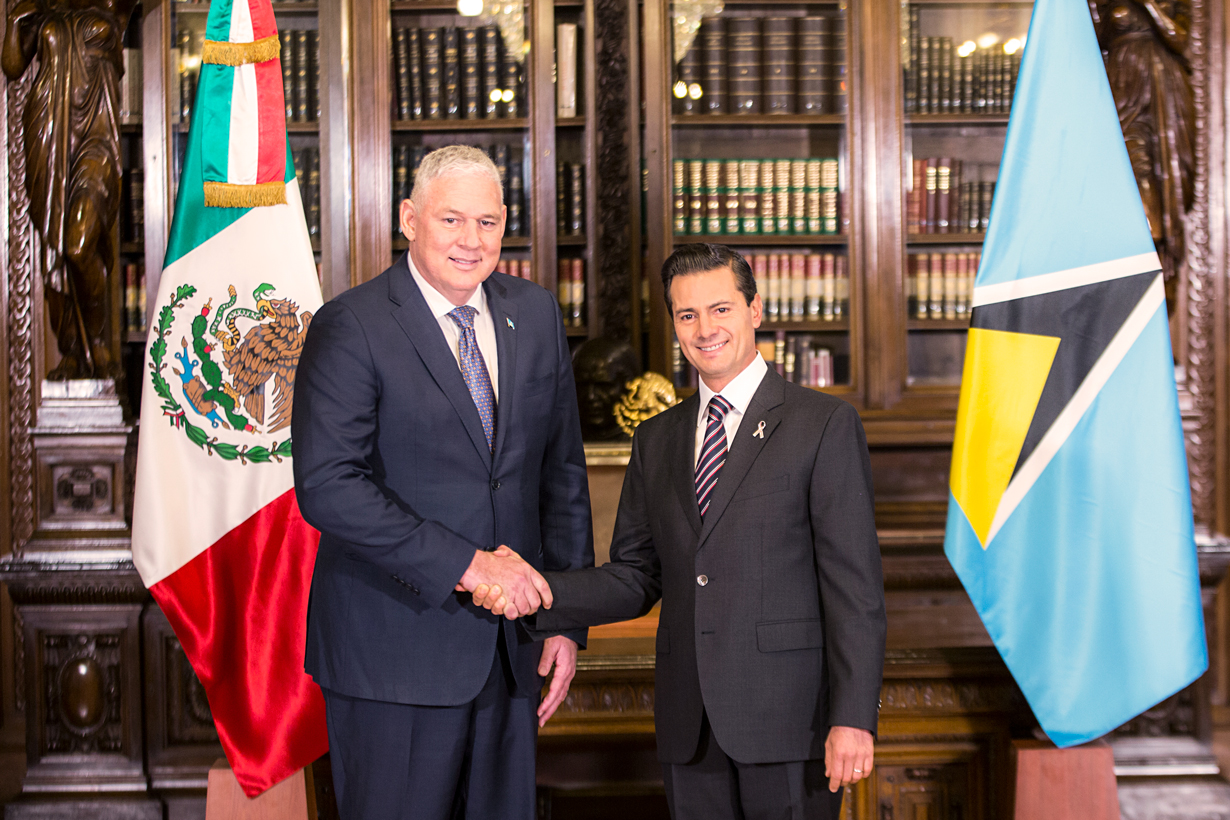
Saint Lucian Prime Minister, Allen Chastanet, on an official visit to Mexico along with Mexican President Enrique Peña Nieto; October 2017.

High-level visits from Mexico to Saint Lucia

- Foreign Minister José Antonio Meade (2014)
- Foreign Undersecretary Socorro Flores Liera (2016)
- Foreign Minister Luis Videgaray Caso (2018)

High-level visits from Saint Lucia to Mexico

- Prime Minister Stephenson King (2010)
- Prime Minister Allen Chastanet (2017)
- Prime Minister Philip J. Pierre (2021, 2024)

== Bilateral agreements ==
Both nations have signed a few bilateral agreements such as an Agreement for the Exchange of Information on Tax Matters (2013); Agreement of Cooperation in the Fields of Education, Culture, Youth, Physical Culture and Sports (2014); and an Agreement for Technical and Scientific Cooperation (2014). Each year, the Mexican government offers scholarships for nationals of Saint Lucia to study postgraduate studies at Mexican higher education institutions.

== Trade ==
In 2023, trade between Mexico and Saint Lucia totaled US$4.2 million. Mexico's main exports to Saint Lucia include: motor vehicles, household electronics, refrigerators, stoves, grates and cookers; alcohol, chemical based products and clothing articles. Saint Lucia's main exports to Mexico include: parts and accessories of machine tools, instruments and apparatus for regulating and controlling flows, vegetables wax, conveyor belts and screws and bolts.

== Resident diplomatic missions ==
- Mexico has an embassy in Castries.
- Saint Lucia is accredited to Mexico from its embassy in Washington, D.C., United States.
