= Saint Lucian Creole =

French-based creole spoken in Saint Lucia

- kwéyòl, patwa
- Native to: Saint Lucia
- Region: Lesser Antilles
- Ethnicity: Afro-Saint Lucians
- Native speakers: 700,000 (2016)
- Language family: Creole of African languages lexified by French: Circum-Caribbean French; Antillean Creole; Saint Lucian Creole
- Dialects: St Lucian Patois; San Miguel Creole French

Language codes
- ISO 639-3: Either: acf – Saint Lucian Creole French scf – San Miguel Creole French
- Glottolog: sain1246
- ELP: San Miguel Creole French
- Linguasphere: 51-AAC-ccg

Saint Lucian Creole (kwéyòl pronounced [kwejɔl]) is a French-based creole language that is widely spoken in Saint Lucia. It is the vernacular language of the country and is spoken alongside the official language of English.

Kwéyòl is a variety of Antillean Creole, and like other varieties spoken in the Caribbean, it combines the syntax of African language origins and a Latin-based vocabulary as shared by the French. Like its similar Dominican counterpart, some words are derived from the English, French and African languages. There has also been a recorded syntactical influence of the Carib language.

It remains in widespread use in Saint Lucia across the island. Though it is not an official language, the government and media houses present information in Kwéyòl alongside English.

== Origins ==
Saint Lucia was first settled by Amerindian groups, more recently the Caribs, and subsequently colonised by the French and the British, who changed hands of control over the island a total of fourteen times. The British first attempted to colonise the island in 1605, but were killed or driven out by the Carib inhabitants. French groups gradually began colonising the island, and by 1745 they succeeded in regaining control over the island as well as establishing functional administrative settlements.

Like other forms of Antillean Creole, Saint Lucian Creole emerged as a form of communication between the African slaves on Caribbean plantations. It combines Latin-based vocabulary shared by the French with syntax from the various African languages of the slaves.

From French groups immigrating from Martinique, a form of Creole was imported and adopted by the black population living in small, remote mountain settlements as a vernacular.

Ownership of St. Lucia alternated between the French and the British between 1778 and 1802 until the British gained complete control over the island in 1803, which was formalised by the Treaty of Paris in 1814. St. Lucia became independent in 1979 with Sir John Compton serving as the first prime minister. English became the official language of the country, though Kwéyòl remained in widespread use throughout the island and was the sole language of the majority of the population. Kwéyòl monolingualism increasingly became less common over time due to the precedence of English within the education system, which became more accessible to the general population through the mid-1960s.

== History ==
It is a subvariety of Antillean Creole, which is spoken in other islands of the Lesser Antilles, and is very closely related to the varieties spoken in Martinique, Dominica, Guadeloupe, Grenada and Trinidad and Tobago. The intelligibility rate with speakers of other varieties of Antillean Creole is almost 100%. Its syntactic, grammatical and lexical features are virtually identical to that of Martinican Creole, but, just like its Dominican counterpart, it includes more English loanwords than the Martinican variety.

Like the other Caribbean Creoles, Saint Lucian French Creole combines syntax of African and Carib origin with vocabulary derived primarily from French. In addition, many expressions reflect the presence of English influence. As younger bilingual speakers of Kwéyòl and English grew up, the Kwéyòl language changed to reflect this bilingualism. It is not considered to be mutually intelligible with Standard French, but it is intelligible with the other French creoles of the Lesser Antilles. Kwéyòl is related to Haitian Creole and is mutually intelligible with it despite its distinctive futures.

Kwéyòl is still widely spoken in Saint Lucia and movements from the 1980s onward have increased its use in media, education, and government. Although it has not yet been recognized as an official language alongside English, a large number of St. Lucians has come to view the language more positively and support its official implementation. In the mid-19th century, Kwéyòl was exported to Panama, where it is known as San Miguel Creole French and is now moribund.

== Orthography ==
The Kwéyol writing system contains 24 letters representing 32 phonemes. This writing system used in St. Lucia and Dominica differs slightly from that used in Guadeloupe and Martinique. The letters <q> and <x> are not used, and the letter <r> only appears in English loan words. The letters <c> and <u> never appear by themselves and are always part of the digraphs <ch> and <ou>.

These are the combinations of letters (digraphs) that represent one sound:

- <ch>, <dj>, <ng>, <tj> represent the consonants /ʃ/, /d͡ʒ/, /ŋ/, /t͡ʃ/.
- <an>, <en>, <on> represent the nasal vowels /ã/, /ẽ/, /õ/ respectively.
- <ou> represents the vowel /u/.

Letter	Phoneme	Letter	Phoneme
A a	/a/	M m	/m/
An an	/ã/	N n	/n/
B b	/b/	Ng ng	/ŋ/
Ch ch	/ʃ/	O o	/o/
D d	/d/	Ò ò	/ɔ/
Dj dj	/d͡ʒ/	On on	/õ/
É é	/e/	Ou ou	/u/
È è	/ɛ/	P p	/p/
En en	/ẽ/	R r	/ɹ/
F f	/f/	S s	/s/
G g	/ɡ/	T t	/t/
H h	/h/	Tj tj	/t͡ʃ/
I i	/i/	V v	/v/
J j	/ʒ/	W w	/w/
K k	/k/	Y y	/j/
L l	/l/	Z z	/z/

== Phonology ==
=== Consonants ===
		Labial	Alveolar	Post- alveolar	Palatal	Velar	Glottal
Nasal		m	n			ŋ	
Plosive/ affricate	voiceless	p	t	t͡ʃ		k	
Plosive/ affricate	voiced	b	d	d͡ʒ		ɡ	
Fricative	voiceless	f	s	ʃ			h
Fricative	voiced	v	z	ʒ^{3}		ɣ^{2}	h
Approximant			l	ɹ^{1}	j	w	

Phonetic notes:

1. This sound only occurs in a select few loan words from English ex. radyo /ɹadjo/ radio.
2. In many varieties of Creole most notably rural dialects the voiced velar fricative /ɣ/ merges with the velar approximant /w/. In this article we will use the written standard for Saint Lucian creole which does not indicate the distinction between the two phonemes.
3. The voiced post-alveolar fricative /ʒ/ often alternates with the unvoiced glottal fricative /h/: /manʒe/ > /manhe/ "to eat", /ʒape/ > /hape/ "to bark", /ʒadẽ/ > /hadẽ/ "garden"

=== Vowels ===
Oral
	Front	Central	Back
Close	i		u
Close-mid	e		o
Open-mid	ɛ		ɔ
Open		a	

Nasal
	Front	Back
Close-mid	ẽ	õ
Open	ã	

- Antillean Creole
- Dominican Creole French
- Grenadian Creole French
- Haitian Creole

== Grammar ==
=== Personal Pronouns ===
Kwéyol	Weak Form	English
mwen, an	-	I, me
ou	w	you
i, li	y	he, she, it
nou	-	we, us
zòt, zò, hòt, hò	-	you (plural)
yo	-	they, them

Kwéyòl makes no distinction of grammatical case in pronouns: 'mwen' can mean I, me, or my.

The first person singular form 'an' is uncommon, but its use is quite widespread in spoken Creole in Guadeloupe.

The pronouns above can fulfill several syntactical roles:

- Subject — Mwen ka palé kwéyòl.
- Object — Nonm-lan bo'y.
- Possessive pronouns — Papa yo malad.

The weak forms occur after vowels:

Palé ba'y! Mwen wè'w.

The pronoun mwen has several contracted forms:

M’a - mwen pa Ng’a - mwen ka

N’a - mwen pa ka Ng’ay - mwen kay

N’ay - mwen pa kay M’òkò - mwen pa ankò

=== Possessive Adjectives ===
Creole	English	Example	Example
mwen	my	fiyèl mwen	do mwen
ou, w	your	fiyèl ou	do'w
li, y	his, her, its	fiyèl li	do'y
nou	our	fiyèl nou	do nou
zòt	your (pl.)	fiyèl zòt	do zòt
yo	their	fiyèl yo	do yo

In Creole, possessive adjectives are placed after the noun. Ou 'your' and li 'his, her, its become w and y after a vowel.

Unlike in English or French, possessive adjectives can be used in addition to the indefinite and definite articles: "jan mwen" is 'my friend', "an jan mwen" is 'a friend of mine', and "jan mwen-an" is 'my friend'.

The use of the definite article changes the connotation; whereas "jan mwen" would refer to my friend as opposed to someone else's, "jan mwen-an" would refer to a specific friend who had already been mentioned at a prior point in the conversation.

=== Possessive Pronouns ===
	Singular	Plural
mine	san mwen(-an)	sé san mwen-an
yours	sa (w)ou(-a)	sé sa (w)ou-a
his, hers, its	sa li(-a)	sé sa li-a
ours	san nou(-a)	sé san nou-a
yours	sa zòt(-la)	sé sa zòt-la
theirs	sa yo(-a)	sé sa yo-a
whose	sa ki moun	

=== Interrogatives ===
how	kouman, ki jan, ki mannyè
what	ki sa, sa
when	ki lè
where	ki koté, ki bò, koté
which, what	ki
which one	kilès
who	ki moun
whose	ki moun
why	poutji

Ki is used as an interrogative adjective placed before a noun meaning 'what' or 'which'. — "Ki chimiz ou simyé?"; Which shirt do you prefer?

Kilès is an interrogative pronoun. — "Kilès ou simyé?"; Which do you prefer?

Kilès used as the subject directly before the verb is followed by the relative pronoun ki. — "Kilès ki pli gwo?"; Which is bigger?

When ki moun is used as the subject and comes directly before the verb it is followed by the relative pronoun ki. — "Ki moun ki di'w sa?"; Who told you that?

Note, however: Ki moun ou yé?; Who are you?

Ki moun used to mean 'whose' (belonging to whom) and as such directly follows the noun in question. — "Had ki moun ou ka lavé?"; Whose clothes are you washing?

=== Nouns ===
Nouns in Kwéyòl are invariable, they do not inflect for case or number. There is no grammatical gender, unlike French.

	Indefinite	Definite
Singular	an wòch	wòch-la
Plural	wòch	sé wòch-la

=== Articles ===
The indefinite article is an, on, yan or yon

An mabwiya A house lizard On bétjin A barracuda Yan zé An egg Yon fèy A leaf

The definite article may take the form -a, -la, -an, or -lan depending on the sounds of the final syllable of the noun it qualifies. It comes after the noun.

latè a the earth

tab la the table

mouton an the sheep

nonm lan the man

Definite Articles
	Oral vowel	Nasal vowel
Vowel ending	-a	-an
Consonant ending	-la	-lan

=== Verbs ===
Verb Tenses
Particle	Negative	Tense	Creole	English	Creole	English
ø	pa	Preterite/ Present Perfect	I vini	He came He has come	I pa vini	He didn't come He hasn't come
ka	pa ka pa'a	Present Progressive	Mwen ka palé Ng'a palé	I am speaking	Mwen pa ka palé M'a ka palé	I wasn't speaking
kay	pa kay	Immediate Future	Mwen kay alé Ng'ay alé	I'm going to go	Mwen pa kay alé M'a kay alé	I am not going
té	pa té	Past/ Past Perfect	Nou té di	We said We had said	Nou pa té di	We didn't say We hadn't said
té ka	pa té ka	Progressive Past	Zòt té ka manjé	Y'all were eating	Zòt pa té ka manjé	Y'all were not eating
té kay	pa té kay	Conditional	Mwen té kay pran	I would take	Mwen pa té kay alé	I would not go
soti		'have just'	Mwen sòti rivé	I've just arrived	Mwen pa sòti rive	I have not just gone out
té soti		'had just'	Albè té sòti sòti	Albert had just gone out	Albè té sòti sòti	Albert had not just gone gone out
ja	p'òkò pò´ò (pa ankò)	'already'	Sé timanmay-la ja fè	The children already did	Sé timanmay-la p'òkò fè Sé timanmay-la pò'ò fè	The children have not already done The children had not yet done

Verbs in Creole are invariable and are not conjugated. Instead tense and mood are expressed using various particles placed before the verb.

- ø the absence of a particle indicates the simple past: pwèt-la bwè kafé the priest drank coffee

It also indicates the present perfect, this difference inferred through context: pwèt-la bwè kafé the priest has drunk coffee

There is a group of verbs, mostly modals and verbs of emotion which do not follow this rule and instead express the present tense when used on their own. These verbs are:

ni 'to have' sa 'to be able to' pé 'to be able to' vlé 'to want' konnèt 'to know' sav 'to know' enmen 'to love' kontan 'to like' hayi 'to hate' simyé 'to prefer' kwè 'to believe' dwé 'to owe' wigwété 'to regret'

Mak ni an pil lahan 'Mark has a lot of money' Kilès kay ou simyé? Which house do you prefer? Ou vlé witounen denmen 'You want to return tomorrow'

- ka This particle expresses the simple present, present continuous as well as habitual present

Tibway-la ka wè kabwit-la The by sees the goat

Fanm-lan ka déjnen The woman is having breakfast

Lapli ka tonbé an chay an livènaj It rains a lot during the rainy season

Serial Verbs

A feature which Saint Lucian French Creole shares with other West Atlantic Creole languages is the ability to string verbs together.

A main verb may be combined with a select group of verbs of motion (namely alé 'to go' vini 'to come' kouwi 'to run' pòté 'to carry' mennen 'to lead' voyé 'to send')

I kouwi alé lékòl He went to school running.

Irregular verbs

There are only three irregular verbs in Creole alé (to go), gadé (to look, watch) and the copula sé.

- Alé has a second form ay. There is no change in meaning and the two forms are interchangeable.

Alé also forms a contraction with the verb particle ka; ka alé kalé ka ay kay.

- Gadé has two forms in the imperative: ga and gadé although gad may sometimes be heard as well.
- Sé is irregular in that it does not take verb particles. Instead the verb particles itself are used in place of a verb only in the present tense is it present. The present tense has two forms, one used before a noun (sé) and the other used when it is placed at the end of a sentence (yé)

In the present sé is not used to link a noun and a predicative adjective. It is used before a noun.

Nonm-lan ho. The man is tall. (Lit. The man tall)

but: I sé an nonm ho. He is a tall man.

The past tense also has two forms either the past tense particle té or the form sété with these forms being interchangeable.

Tense	Form
Present	ø, sé, yé
Past	té, sété
Future	kay (ké)
Conditional	té kay (té ké)

The future and conditional forms ké and té ké are not used in Saint Lucia but can be heard on other islands where Creole is spoken.

=== Prepositions ===
- a - at, on, to (limited use)
- abò - on board, on, in

òbò (Guadeloupe)

Yo mouté abò minibous-la. They got into the bus.

- adan - 1) inside, in 2) out of, out from

1) I mété kwéyon-an adan pòch li. He put the pencil in his pocket. 2) I sòti mouchwè adan pòch li. He took the kerchief out of his pocket.

- akòdans - according to, in accordance with

Yo pa ka viv akòdans pawòl Bondyé. They are not living according to God's word.

- alapòté - alongside, beside, next to

Kon kannòt-la wivé alapòté tjé-a, péchè-a mawé kòd-la vitman. When the boat arrived alongside the dock the fisherman tied the rope quickly.

- alimans, aliman - side by side

Yo té asiz alimans yonn a lòt. They sat side by side.

- an, nan - in, upon

Sé timanmay-la ka jwé an savann-an. The children are playing in the field.

- anba - below, under

Tifi-a séwé pòpòt li anba kouch-la. The girl hid her doll under the bed.

- andidan - 1) inside 2) out of, out from

1) Jibyé-a andidan kalòj-la. The bird is inside the cage. 2)Kwab-la sòti andidan twou-a. The crab exited the hole.

- andji - instead of, rather than

Andji ou édé mwen ou ka wi mwen! Instead of helping me you are laughing at me!

- anho - above, over

Lanp-lan ka pann anho tab-la. The lamp is hanging above the table.

- anlè - 1) on top of 2) off of, off from

1) Liv-la anlè tab-la. The book is on top of the table. 2) Yo tiyé'y anlè tab-la. They took it off the table.

- anmitan, nanmitan - in the middle of

Nou wè'y anmitan lawi-a. We saw him in the middle of the street.

- anpami - among

I té ka séwé anpami sé moun-nan. He was hiding among those people.

- ant - between

Motoka-a ant légliz-la èk lékòl-la. The car is between the church and the school.

- antiwan, antiwans - except

Ou pé pwan tout sé liv-la antiwan sé sala. You can take all the books except those ones.

- apwé - after

Yo antwé yonn apwé lòt. They entered one after the other.

- asou - 1) on top of 2) off of, off from 3) toward 4) about, concerning

1) Bonm-lan asou mach-la. The bucket is on the step.2) Gwanmanman mwen tiwé chòdyè-a asou difé-a. My grandmother took the cooking pot off the fire.

3) Polis-la maché asou nonm-lan. The police officer walked towards the man. 4) Mwen pa lontan palé asou politik. I don't like talking about politics.

asi (Guadeloupe) sou (Haiti)

- ba, ban, bay - for

Fè sa ba li. Do that for him. Fanm-lan achté an bonbon ban mwen. The woman bought me a cake. Nou kay fè'y bay zòt. We'll do it for you.

- bò - alongside, beside, next to

Wétjen-an vini bò tjé-a. The shark came near to the dock.

- bòdaj - alongside, beside, next to

Sé chouval-la té ka pozé bòdaj chimen-an. The horses were resting next to the road.

- dapwé - according to (ones own understanding)

Dapwé'w mwen té ka pasé an ti chimen. You thought I was walking on the small path.

- dépi - from, since

1) Dépi ansyen dat nonm ka jwé gwenndé. People have played dice since ancient times. 2) I té ni gwo dlo dépi Bèson pou wivé Kastwi. There was flooding from Bexon to Castries.

- dèwò, dòwò - outside

Chyen-an dèwò kay-la. The dog is outside the house.

- dèyè - 1) behind 2) after ( in pursuit of)

1) Machann-nan dèyè yan pyébwa. The vendor is behind the tree. 2) Sé chyen-an ka kouwi dèyè chat-la. The dogs are running after the cat.

- di - of (limited use)

I alé Langlitè a laj di ventan. He went to England at the age of twenty. Sé gwanmoun-nan ka palé di politik. The elders are talking about politics.

- douvan - in front of, before

Ou pé mouté montany-lan ki doubout douvan'w-la. You can climb the mountain that stands before you.

- èksèpté, asèpté - except

Sé polis-la awèsté toutmoun ki té adan kay wonm-lan èksèpté nonm sala. The police arrested everyone who was in the rum shop except that man.

- é, èk, èvè, èvèk, èp, épi - with

Mak té alé an vil épi manman´y. Mark went to town with his mother. Nou kontan twavay èvèw. We like to work with you.

- hòd - from, away from

1) Fanm-lan ka wété dis kilomèt hòd twavay li-a. The woman lives ten kilometres from work. 2) Tounen hòd péché zòt! Turn away from your sins!

- jis, jik - until, as far as, up to

Jis ki koté ou ka wivé Up to which point are you going (Where are you going)

- konsèné - about, concerning

Mwen té kay vlé palé ba'w konsèné ich ou. I would like to speak to you about your child.

- kont - 1) against 2) about, because of

1) Nou kont lwa nèf-la. We are against the new law. 2) Mwen faché kont bonm-lan ki tonbé-a. I am angry about the bucket that fell.

- lanmen, lenmen - from

Yo achté tout ba'ay lanmen'y. They bought everything from him.

- ofon - at the bottom of

Chatou ka viv ofon lanmè-a. Octopuses live at the bottom of the sea.

- olyè - instead of

Chwézi wòb sala olyè sala. Choose this dress instead of that one.

- owon, oliwon - around

Nou maché tout owon vilaj-la ka chaché timanmay sala. We walked all around the village looking for that child.

alantou (Guadeloupe) otou (Haiti)

- pa - by, through

1) Bondyé sové nou pa lagwas li. God saved us through his grace. 2) Yo ka vann zowanj dé dòla pa liv. They sell oranges for two dollars a pound.

- pou - for, in order to, ni pou - must

1)Tantant mwen wété la pou dé nanné. My aunt lived there for two years. 2) Machann-nan vann dé bwapen ba li pou sis dòla. The vendor sold him two breadfruits for six dollars.

3) Nou wimèsyé'y pou vizité nou. We thanked him for visiting us. 4) I vini pou étidyé. He came to study. 5) Sé pou nou alé an hòtè chaché manjé. We have to go to the country to look for food.

6) Ou ni pou éséyé. You have to try.

- pwé, opwé - near

Légliz-la pwé lapòs-la. The church is near the post office.

- san - without

I kouwi jik bòdlanmè-a san soulyé. He ran all the way to the sea side without shoes.

- silon - according to

Silon jij-la nonm-lan té koupab. According to the judge the man was guilty.

- vizavi - in line with, with respect to

I ka maché vizavi wout-la. He is walking in line with the road.

== Vocabulary ==
The Vocabulary of SLC is mostly derived from French with important contributions from English and West African languages.

=== English Derived Vocabulary ===
Word	Meaning	English	Word	Meaning	English
akennsin	type of freshwater fish	Atkinson/Tilapia	mitin		meeting
amèn		amen	motoka	car	motor car
bak	to reverse	back	nòlaj		knowledge
baka	supporter	backer	nòs		nurse
banndjo		banjo	panyt		pint
bék	flat bread cooked on hot plate	bake	pennsil	penis	pencil
bèlibann	cinch, girth	bellyband	pitj	to pave with asphalt	pitch
bésin		basin	plasta	bandage	plaster
bol	ball, cricket	bowl	plég		plague
bway		boy	plén		aeroplane
chéd	shed, shelter	shade	pwotèkté, potèkté		to protect
chlen	25 cents	shilling	radyo		radio
diskasyon		discussion	rèkòd		record
djal	attractive girl or woman	girl	roro	uproar, tumult	row
djip		jeep	sayd		side
djòb		job	sentdjòn	Saint John flower	Saint John
djòs		just	slak	loose	slack
dòla		dollar	stéchann	police station	station
drayv		to drive	swing		swing
èkstré		X-ray	switi	sweetie, candy	sweetie
fak	gardening fork	fork	taks		tax
faktri		factory	tanmadòz		tomato
fama		farmer	taya		tire
fas		to fast	tép		tape
fin		thin	tim		team
flas	thermos	flask	tin	can	tin
fridj		fridge	titj		to teach
gòg	liquor	grog	titja		teacher
hèlsenta		health centre	tiyéta		theatre
ilèkté		to elect	tjiki	nosy	cheeky
ka		care	tjok	clogged	choked
kanmèl		camel	tjòkanblòk	haphazardly	chockablock
kanp	camp, camping	camp	tou		too
kapa	small change	copper	trakta		tractor
kawozin		kerosene	tròk		truck
kés	court case	case	vann		van
kòlvèt		culvert	waflé		to raffle
konpyouta		computer	waya		wire
kòrèk	good, OK, well	correct	widjèkté		to reject
layt	light (that shines)	light	wivòlva	revolver, pistol	revolver
mannwa	warship	man of war	wòf		wharf
misték		mistake	yis		yeast

Creole is a language historically and primarily spoken in rural areas. As such it has a large assortment of words related to nature, agriculture and fishing

=== Zannimo - Animals ===
==== Jibyé - Birds ====
gwigwi poul	chicken hawk	mwennson	type of small bird
gwiv	Tropical Mockingbird (Mimus gilvus)	pèdwi	wild dove
jako	St. Lucia Parrot (Amazona versicolor)	pélékan	pelican
jibyé lapli	rain bird	pijon	pigeon
kanna	duck	pipirit	Gray Kingbird (Tyrannus dominicensis)
kawouj	St. Lucia Oriole (Icterus laudabilis)	poul	hen
kayal	egret, cowbird	sikwiyé	Bananaquit (Coereba flaveola)
kilibwi, koulibwi	hummingbird	sisi Bondyé	type of humming bird
kòbo	vulture	sisi zèb	Black-faced Grassquit (Melanospiza bicolor)
kodenn	turkey	sizo	Magnificent Frigatebird (Fregata magnificens)
kòk	cockerel	toutwèl	Zenaida Dove (Zenaida aurita)
koukou mannyòk	Mangrove Cuckoo (Coccyzus minor)	twanblè	trembler
kwabyé	Great Blue Heron (Ardea herodias)	wanmyé	wood pigeon
lèg	eagle	wondèl	a type of bird
malfini	chicken hawk	zatolan	Common Ground Dove (Columbina passerina)
mèl	black bird	pitjwit	Spotted Sandpiper (Actitis macularius)

==== Pwéson - Fish ====
akennsin	type of fresh water fish	kwab	crab
babawen	goatfish	kwab hont	red sea crab
bak	river crab	kwab mal zòwèy	fiddler crab
balawou	a type of small fish with a long snout	labé	drum fish (Equetus Ardenherodia)
banndjo	skipjack tuna	makwéyo	mackerel
bawé	king fish, wahoo	pantoufouyé	hammerhead shark
bétjin	barracuda	pwéson amé	pufferfish
bous	Queen trigger fish (Balistes vetula)	pwéson gwo zyé	redsnapper
chadon nwè	black sea urchin (Diadema antillarum)	pwéson nas	potfish
chadon, chadwon	white sea urchin (Strongltocentrus spp.)	siwik	blue crab
chatou	octopus	sòlda	hermit crab
chès	squid	souwi	goatfish
djouk	kind of pot fish	taza	king mackerel
dowad	dolphin	tilapiya	tilapia
hawansò	herring	ton	tuna
kaka bawi	type of salt water fish	touloulou	beach side crab
kaka poul	type of salt water fish	volan	flying fish
kamo	type of fresh water fish	wétjen	shark
kawanng	amberjack fish	wétjen blan	white shark
kiliyou, kiliwou	type of fish	wétjen sab	sand shark
kòdonnyé	jackfish	zagaya	a type of crab
kòf	boxfish	zandji, jandji	fresh water eel
konng	moray eel	zòfi	needle fish, garfish

==== Mamifè - Mammals ====
balenn	whale	léfan	elephant
bèf	cow	lyon	lion
bouk	billy goat	machwen	porpoise
bouwik	donkey	mangous	mongoose
chanmo	camel	mannikou	opossum
chat	cat	milé	mule
chouval	horse	mouton	sheep
chyen	dog	sòlsouwi	bat
dowad	dolphin	souwit	mouse
kabwit	goat	tig, chat tig	tiger
kanmèl	camel	wadenn	guinea pig
kochon	pig	wat	rat
lapen	rabbit		

==== Bèt - Bugs ====
bèt kochon	type of insect	matoutou	tarantula
bèt patat	sweet potato bug	mawisosé	dragonfly
bèt san zo	slug	maygwen	mosquito
bètafé	firefly	mòpyon	pubic louse
bètannipyé	centipede	mouch	fly
chini	caterpillar	mouklé	click beetle
chouval BonDyé	praying mantis	papiyon	moth
djèp	wasp	papiyòt	butterfly
eskoupyon	scorpion	pinèz	bedbug
fonmi	ant	pis	flea
kalmason	snail	pou	head louse
kangowi	millipede	vè	worm
katin	black widow spider	ven kat nèditan	black widow
klaklak, krakrak	locust	vonvon, vonvon myèl, myèl	bee
kwitjèt	grasshopper	wavèt	cockroach
kwitjèt bwa	type of very large grasshopper	yenyen	fruit fly
kwitjèt senkèy	coffin shaped grasshopper	zagwiyen	spider
kwitjèt vè	cicada	zwi	cricket

==== Wèptil épi anfibyen - Reptiles and amphibians ====
sèpan	snake	agalo	leatherback turtle
kouwès	Kouwes snake	kawèt	sea turtle
zanndoli	tree lizard	kwapo	toad
zanndoli tè	ground lizard	tolin, ti tolin	type of small frog
léza	iguana	gwat kwi	type of small frog
kayman	alligator	gounouy	frog
tòti	sea turtle	tèt chyen	boa constrictor
mòlòkòy	tortoise	dwagon	dragon

=== Place names ===
==== Sent Lisi - Saint Lucia ====
Babonno	Babonneau	Labowi	Laborie
Bèson	Bexon	Lanslawé	Anse la Raye
Chwazèy, Swazèy	Choiseul	Mikou	Micoud
Dennwi	Dennery	Ojé	Augier
Déwiso	Dérisseaux	Pwalen	Praslin
Gwozilé	Gros Ilet	Sent Lisi	Saint Lucia
Kannawi	Canaries	Soufwiyè, Soufouyè	Soufrière
Kastwi	Castries	Vyé Fò	Vieux Fort

=== Sample text ===
Article 1 of the Universal Declaration of Human Rights in Saint Lucia Creole:

Tout moun né lib èk égal an dignité èk dwa. Yo ni wézon èk an konsyans èk ni pou twété yonn a lòt épi an lèspwi di fwatènité.

Article 1 of the Universal Declaration of Human Rights in English:

All human beings are born free and equal in dignity and rights. They are endowed with reason and conscience and should act towards one another in a spirit of brotherhood.
