= Patois =

Dialect or variety that is considered "sub-standard" and generally lacks a written form

Patois (/ˈpætwɑː/, pl. same or /ˈpætwɑːz/) is speech or language that is considered nonstandard, although the term is not formally defined in linguistics. As such, patois can refer to pidgins, creoles, dialects or vernaculars, but not commonly to jargon or slang, which are vocabulary-based forms of cant.

In colloquial usage of the term, especially in France, class distinctions are implied by the very meaning of the term, since in French, patois refers to any sociolect associated with uneducated rural classes, in contrast with the dominant prestige language (Standard French) spoken by the middle and high classes of cities or as used in literature and formal settings (the "acrolect"). Sociolinguistics is the discipline that studies the relationship between these language varieties, how they relate to the dominant culture and, in the case of France, to national language policy.

== Etymology ==
The term patois comes from Old French patois 'local or regional dialect' (originally meaning 'rough, clumsy or uncultivated speech'), possibly from the verb patoier 'to treat roughly', from patte 'paw', from Old Low Franconian *patta 'paw, sole of the foot', plus the suffix -ois.

== Examples ==
In France and other Francophone countries, patois has been used to describe non-standard French and regional languages such as Picard, Occitan and Franco-Provençal since 1643, and Catalan after 1700 when King Louis XIV banned its use. The word assumes the view of such languages being backward, countrified and unlettered; thus the term patois is potentially considered offensive when used by outsiders. As Jean Jaurès once said, "One names patois the language of a defeated nation." In France and Switzerland, however, the term patois no longer holds any offensive connotation, and has become a celebrated and distinguished variant of the numerous local tongues.

The vernacular form of English spoken in Jamaica is also referred to as patois or patwa. It is noted especially in reference to Jamaican Patois from 1934. Jamaican Patois language consists of words from the native languages spoken by many Caribbean ethnic and cultural groups including Spanish, Portuguese, Chinese, Amerindian, English and several African languages. Additionally, some islands have Creole dialects influenced by French, Spanish, Arabic, Hebrew, German, Dutch, Italian, Chinese, Vietnamese and others. Jamaican Patois is also spoken in Costa Rica and French Creole is spoken in Caribbean countries such as Trinidad and Tobago and Guyana in South America.

Often, these patois are popularly considered "broken English" or slang, but cases such as Jamaican Patois are classified more correctly as a Creole language. Notably, in the Francophone Caribbean, the analogous term for local basilectal languages is créole (see also Jamaican English and Jamaican Creole). Antillean Creole, in addition to French, is spoken in Lesser Antilles and includes vocabulary and grammar of African and Carib origin. Its dialects often contain folk-etymological derivatives of French words. For example, lavier ("river, stream"), a syncopated variant of the standard French phrase la rivière ("the river"), has been associated by folk etymology with laver ("to wash"). Therefore, lavier is interpreted to mean "a place to wash" since such streams are often used for washing laundry.

Other examples of patois include Trasianka, Sheng and Tsotsitaal.

In Spain, the Benasquese, a dialect spoken in Benás, Aragón, is often called patués (patois).

In Uruguay, patois has been spoken by citizens in the south of Uruguay, many who hail from France and Piedmont region of Italy.

In Scotland, the lowland Scots language dialect in Glasgow contains localised slang known as "patter" which, given Scotland's historic connections to France, may be derived from the word patois.

== Synonyms ==
Dominican, Grenadian, St. Lucian, Trinidadian and Venezuelan speakers of Antillean Creole call the language patois. It is also named Patuá in the Paria Peninsula of Venezuela and spoken since the eighteenth century by self-colonization of French people (from Corsica) and Caribbean people (from Martinique, Trinidad, Guadeloupe, Puerto Rico, Dominican Republic) who moved for cacao production.

Macanese Patois is also known as Patuá and was originally spoken by the Macanese community of the former Portuguese colony of Macau.
