= Antillean Creole =

French-based creole of the Antilles

- kreyòl, kréyòl, kréyol, kwéyòl, patois, patwa
- Native to: French Antilles (esp. Guadeloupe and Martinique), Dominica, Grenada, Saint Lucia, Haiti, Trinidad and Tobago
- Region: Lesser Antilles
- Native speakers: (13 million cited 1998–2001)
- Language family: French-African Creole: Circum-Caribbean French; Antillean Creole

Language codes
- ISO 639-3: Variously: gcf – Guadeloupean Creole acf – Dominican Creole / Martinican / Saint Lucian scf – San Miguel Creole French (Panama)
- Glottolog: less1242
- ELP: NE
- Linguasphere: 51-AAC-cc (varieties: 51-AAC-cca to -cck)
- IETF: cpf-029

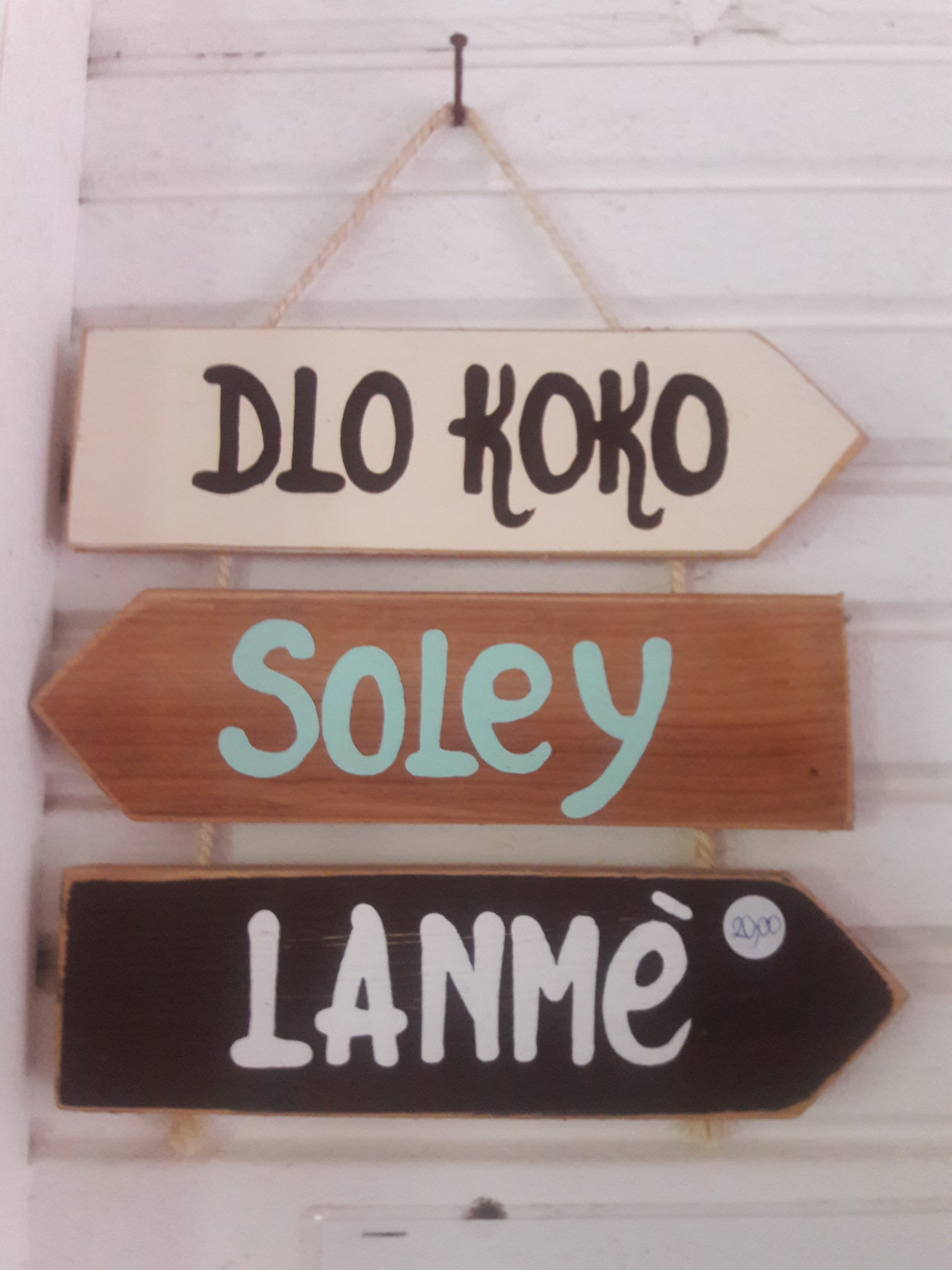
Sign in Martinican Creole: Dlo Koko ("coconut water", from French de l'eau de coco) Soley ("Sun", from soleil) Lanmè ("the sea", from la mer)

Antillean Creole (also known as Lesser Antillean Creole, Kreyol, Kweyol, or Patois) is a creole language that is primarily spoken in the Lesser Antilles. Its grammar and vocabulary include elements of Indigenous languages, African languages, French, and English.

== Geographical situation ==
There are two main geographical and linguistic groups in the Antilles or Caribbean Islands: the Greater Antilles and the Lesser Antilles. Intercomprehension between these two groups is possible, but despite a large proportion of shared vocabulary and largely similar grammatical functioning, it is limited by varying key vocabulary and different words for basic grammar. Nevertheless, it is easy to begin to understand each other completely, as long as one of the two has a basic knowledge of the other's language.

Antillean Creole is spoken natively, to varying degrees, in Haïti, Saint Lucia, Grenada, Guadeloupe, Îles des Saintes, Martinique, Saint-Barthélemy (St. Barts), Dominica, French Guiana, Trinidad and Tobago, and Venezuela (mainly in Macuro, Güiria and El Callao Municipality). It is also spoken in various Creole-speaking immigrant communities in the United States Virgin Islands, British Virgin Islands, and the Collectivity of Saint Martin. Antillean Creole has approximately thirteen million speakers and is a means of communication for migrant populations traveling between neighboring English- and French-speaking territories. Since French is a Romance language, French Antillean Creole is considered to be one of Latin America's languages by some linguists.

In a number of countries (including Dominica, Grenada, St. Lucia, Trinidad, Brazil (Lanc-Patuá) and Venezuela) the language is referred to as patois. It has historically been spoken in nearly all of the Lesser Antilles, but its number of speakers has declined in Trinidad and Tobago and Grenada. Conversely, it is widely used on the islands of Dominica and Saint Lucia; though they are officially English-speaking, there are efforts to preserve the use of Antillean Creole, as there are in Trinidad and Tobago and its neighbour, Venezuela. In recent decades, Creole has gone from being seen as a sign of lower socio-economic status, banned in school playgrounds, to a mark of national pride.

Since the 1970s, there has been a literary revival of Creole in the French-speaking islands of the Lesser Antilles, with writers such as Raphaël Confiant and Monchoachi employing the language. Édouard Glissant wrote theoretically and poetically about its significance and its history.

== History ==
Pierre Belain d'Esnambuc was a French trader and adventurer in the Caribbean who established the first permanent French colony, Saint-Pierre, on the island of Martinique in 1635. Belain sailed to the Caribbean in 1625, hoping to establish a French settlement on the island of St. Christopher (St. Kitts). In 1626, he returned to France, where he won the support of Cardinal Richelieu to establish French colonies in the region. Richelieu became a shareholder in the Compagnie de Saint-Christophe, created to accomplish that with d'Esnambuc at its head. The company was not particularly successful, and Richelieu had it reorganised as the Compagnie des Îles de l'Amérique. In 1635, d'Esnambuc sailed to Martinique with 100 French settlers to clear land for sugarcane plantations.

After six months on Martinique, d'Esnambuc returned to St. Christopher, where he soon died prematurely in 1636, leaving the company and Martinique in the hands of his nephew, Jacques Dyel du Parquet, who inherited d'Esnambuc's authority over the French settlements in the Caribbean. Dyel du Parquet became governor of the island. He remained in Martinique and did not concern himself with the other islands.

The French permanently settled on Martinique and Guadeloupe after being driven off Saint Kitts and Nevis (French: Saint-Christophe) by the British. Fort Royal (now Fort-de-France) on Martinique was a major port for French battle ships in the region from which the French were able to explore the region. In 1638, Dyel du Parquet decided to have Fort Saint Louis built to protect the city against enemy attacks. From Fort Royal, Martinique, Du Parquet proceeded south in search for new territories, established the first settlement in Saint Lucia in 1643 and headed an expedition that established a French settlement in Grenada in 1649.

Despite the long history of British rule, Grenada's French heritage is still evident by the number of French loanwords in Grenadian Creole and the French-style buildings, cuisine and placenames (Petit Martinique, Martinique Channel, etc.)

In 1642, the Compagnie des Îles de l'Amérique received a 20-year extension of its charter. The king would name the governor general of the company, and the company would name the governors of the various islands. However, by the late 1640s, Cardinal Mazarin had little interest in colonial affairs, and the company languished. In 1651, it dissolved itself, selling its exploitation rights to various parties. The Du Paquet family bought Martinique, Grenada and Saint Lucia for 60,000 livres. The sieur d'Houël bought Guadeloupe, Marie-Galante, La Desirade and the Saintes. The Knights of Malta bought Saint Barthélemy and Saint Martin and then sold them in 1665 to the Compagnie des Indes occidentales, formed one year earlier.

Dominica is a former French and British colony in the Eastern Caribbean, about halfway between the French islands of Guadeloupe (to the north) and Martinique (to the south). Christopher Columbus named the island after the day of the week on which he spotted it, a Sunday (Latin: dies Dominica), on 3 November 1493. In the 100 years after Columbus's landing, Dominica remained isolated. At the time, it was inhabited by the Island Caribs, or Kalinago people. Over time, more settled there after they had been driven from surrounding islands, as European powers entered the region.

In 1690, French woodcutters from Martinique and Guadeloupe begin to set up timber camps to supply the French islands with wood and gradually become permanent settlers. France had a colony for several years and imported slaves from West Africa, Martinique and Guadeloupe to work on its plantations. The Antillean Creole language developed.

France formally ceded possession of Dominica to Great Britain in 1763. The latter established a small colony on the island in 1805. As a result, Dominica uses English as an official language, but Antillean Creole is still spoken as a secondary language because of Dominica's location between the French-speaking departments of Guadeloupe and Martinique.

In Trinidad, the Spanish possessed the island but contributed little towards advancements, with El Dorado being their focus. Trinidad was perfect for its geographical location. Because Trinidad was considered underpopulated, Roume de St. Laurent, a Frenchman living in Grenada, was able to obtain a Cédula de Población from King Charles III of Spain on 4 November 1783.

Trinidad's population jumped to over 15,000 by the end of 1789, from just under 1,400 in 1777. In 1797, Trinidad became a British crown colony, despite its French-speaking population.

=== Origin of creole ===
Antillean Creole began as the pidgin "baragouin" in 1635. It was spoken by French settlers, the Africans they enslaved, and Aboriginal peoples that resided on the islands. It originated in the Guadeloupe and Martinique areas of the Lesser Antilles. It was not until 1700, when there was an increase in African influences, that this pidgin transitioned into the creole that it is today. The formation of this creole was influenced by many different dialects and languages. These include dialects of French, other European languages, Carib (both Karina and Arawakan), and African languages.

Due to the influences from its origins, this creole has some distinctive linguistic features. Features of French included in Lesser Antillean Creole include infinitive forms of verbs, the use of only the masculine noun forms, oblique pronouns, and its subject to verb word order. Features from African languages include their verbal marking system as well as providing a West-African substrate. Other features of this creole also include doubling to emphasize a sentence, the word "point" to inflect the negative, and the non-distinguished adverbs and adjectives.

The language emerged in a context of plantation slavery in the French Antilles. Due to differing native tongues, it was difficult for French settlers to communicate with the enslaved Africans and vice versa, as well as for slaves of different ethnic origins to communicate between each other. As a result, they were forced to develop a new form of communication by relying on what they heard from their colonial enslavers and other slaves. According to Jesuit missionary Pierre Pelleprat, French settlers would change their way of speaking to a simpler form to be more accommodating to the enslaved people. For example, to say "I have not eaten" settlers would say "moi point manger" even though the proper French translation is "Je n'ai pas mangé". This simpler form of French, along with linguistic influences from other languages, eventually evolved into Antillean Creole.

== Phonology ==
=== Consonants ===
| | | Labial | Alveolar | Post- alveolar | Palatal | Velar | Glottal |
|---|---|---|---|---|---|---|---|
| Nasal | | m | n | | | ŋ | |
| Plosive/ affricate | voiceless | p | t | t͡ʃ~c | | k | |
| Plosive/ affricate | voiced | b | d | d͡ʒ~ɟ | | ɡ | |
| Fricative | voiceless | f | s | ʃ | | ɣ | h |
| Fricative | voiced | v | z | ʒ | | ɣ | h |
| Approximant | | | l | (ɹ)^{[a]} | j | w | |

^a This sound occurs on islands where the official language is English in certain loanwords e.g radio /ɹadjo/.
The uvular r /ʁ/ only occurs on islands wherein French is an official language. Other dialects use /w/ where the uvular r would occur. Furthermore, this sound is usually pronounced as a velar fricative and is much softer than the European French ⟨r⟩.

=== Vowels ===
Oral
| | Front | Central | Back |
|---|---|---|---|
| Close | i | | u |
| Close-mid | e | | o |
| Open-mid | ɛ | | ɔ |
| Open | | a | |

Nasal
| | Front | Central | Back |
|---|---|---|---|
| Close-mid | ẽ | | õ |
| Open | | ã | |

== Orthography ==
Consonants
| Antillean Creole orthography | IPA | Examples | English approximation |
|---|---|---|---|
| b | b | bagay | bow |
| ch | ʃ | cho | shoe |
| d | d | dous | do |
| dj* | dʒ | djé | job |
| f | f | fig | festival |
| g | ɡ | gòch | gain |
| gy* | ɟ | gyé | |
| h | h | hèn | hotel |
| j | ʒ | jedi | measure |
| k | k | kle | sky |
| ky* | c | kyè | |
| l | l | liv | clean |
| m | m | machin | mother |
| n | n | nòt | note |
| ng | ŋ | bilding | feeling |
| p | p | pase | spy |
| r* | ɣ | rezon | between go and loch |
| r* | ɹ | radyo | radio |
| s | s | sis | six |
| t | t | tout | to |
| tj* | tʃ | tjè | church |
| v | v | vyann | vent |
| z | z | zero | zero |
Semivowels
| w | w | wi | we |
| y | j | pye | yes |

Vowels
| Antillean Creole orthography | IPA | Examples | English approximation |
|---|---|---|---|
| a (or à before an n) | a | abako pàn | bra |
| é | e | alé | hey |
| è | ɛ | fèt | festival |
| i | i | lide | machine |
| o | o | zwazo | roughly like low |
| ò | ɔ | deyò | sort |
| ou | u | nou | you |
Nasal vowels
| an (when not followed by a vowel) | ã | anpil | No English equivalent; nasalized [a] |
| en (when not followed by a vowel) | ɛ̃ | mwen | No English equivalent; nasalized [ɛ] |
| on (when not followed by a vowel) | õ | tonton | No English equivalent; nasalized [o] |

There is some variation in orthography between the islands. In St. Lucia, Dominica and Martinique 'dj' and 'tj' are used whereas in Guadeloupe 'gy' and 'ky' are used. These represent differences in pronunciations. Several words may be pronounced in various ways depending on the region:

'heart'
kè /kɛ/
kyè /cɛ/
tjè /tʃɛ/

The letter 'r' in St. Lucia and Dominica represents the English /ɹ/ whereas in Guadeloupe and Martinique it represents the more French-like sound /ɣ/.

== Grammar ==
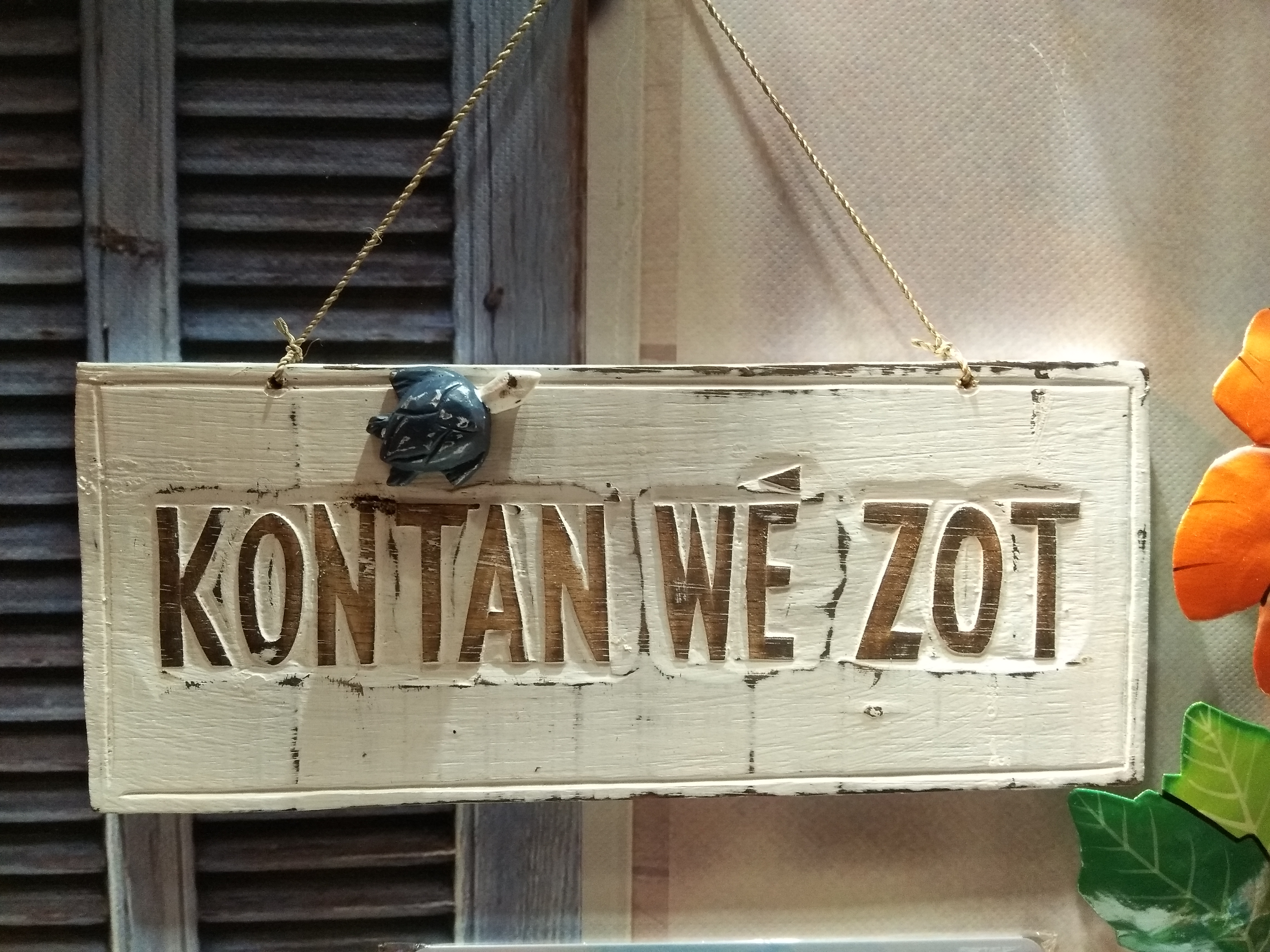
Welcome sign in Martinican Creole: Kontan wè zot, "Happy to see you" (from the French words content, voir, vous-autres).

Personal Pronouns
| Person | Pronoun | Alternate | Weak Form | English |
|---|---|---|---|---|
| 1sg | mwen | an, man, mon^{1} | m, ng, n^{2} | I, me |
| 2sg | ou | - | w^{3} | you |
| 3sg | i | li^{4} | y^{3} | he, she, it |
| 1pl | nou | - | n^{3} | we, us |
| 2pl | zòt | zò, hòt, hò | z^{3},h^{3} | you |
| 3pl | yo | yé | y^{3} | they, them |

1. Mon is used in Dominica and in Grenada #man is used in Martinique. An is used in Guadeloupe, but less so in the latter.
2. m, ng, and n are contracted forms of mwen which occur before certain verb particles: Mwen pa → m'a, mwen ka → ng'a or n'a mwen kay → ng'ay or n'ay
3. w and y occur after a vowel: Nonm-lan wè i → Nonm-lan wè'y, Koumonon ou? → Koumonon'w?
4. li occurs after consonants: Ou konnèt i? → Ou konnèt li?

Personal pronouns in Antillean Creole are invariable so they do not inflect for case as in European languages such as French or English. This means that mwen, for example, can mean I, me or my; yo can mean they, them, their etc.

Possessive Adjectives
| English | General | Guadeloupe | Iles des Saintes |
|---|---|---|---|
| my | mwen | an-mwen | an-mwen |
| your | ou/ w | a-w | òw |
| his, her, its | li/ y | a-y | èy |
| our | nou | an-nou | an-nou |
| your | zot | a-zòt | a-zòt |
| their | yo | a-yo | a-yo |

Possessive adjectives are placed after the noun; kay mwen 'my house', manman'w 'your mother'

'ou' and 'li' are used after nouns ending in a consonant and 'w' and 'y' after nouns ending in a vowel. All other possessive adjectives are invariable.

Kaz ou - Your house, Kouto'w - Your knife

Madanm li - His wife, Sésé'y - Her sister

=== Indefinite article ===
The indefinite article is placed before the noun and can be pronounced as on, an, yon, yan. The word yonn means "one".

On chapo, Yon wavèt

An moun, Yan tòti

=== Definite article ===
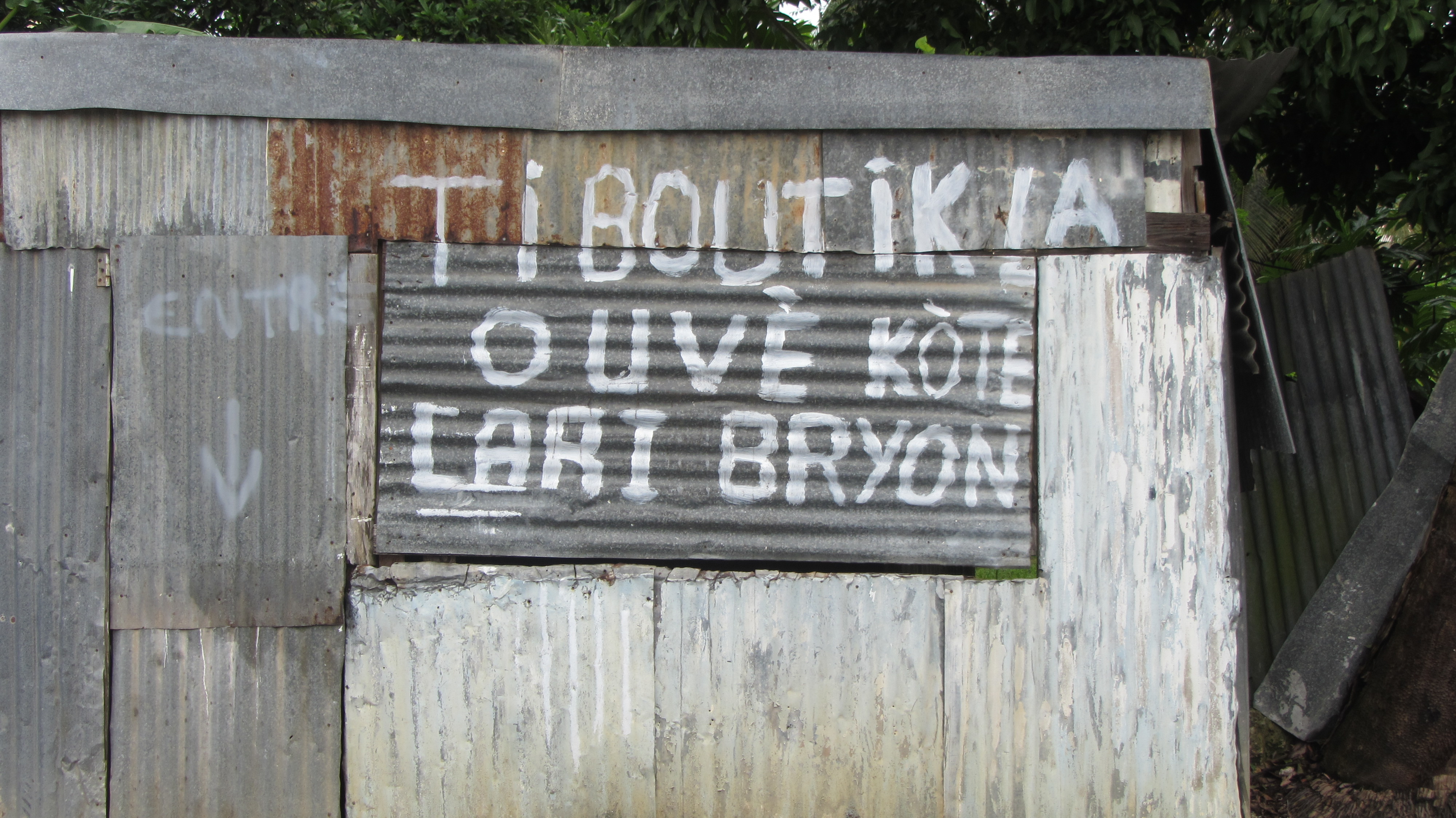
Creole sign in Guadeloupe reading Ti boutik-la ouvè kòté Lari Bryon ("Entrance to the little shop at rue Brion"). Postposition of the definite article (boutik-la instead of la boutique) is evident.

This example does not work for Guadeloupe Creole where article are always "la", and for Haitian Creole whose article are more similar but have "nan" in addition.

In Creole, there are five definite articles (la, lan, a, an, nan) which are placed after the nouns they modify, in contrast to French. The final syllable of the preceding word determines which is used with which nouns.

If the last sound is an oral consonant and is preceded by an oral vowel, it becomes la:

| Antillean Creole | French | English |
|---|---|---|
| kravat-la | la cravate | the tie |
| liv-la | le livre | the book |
| kay-la | la maison | the house |

If the last sound is an oral consonant and is preceded by a nasal vowel, it becomes lan:

| Antillean Creole | French | English |
|---|---|---|
| lamp-lan | la lampe | the lamp |
| nonm-lan | l'homme | the man |
| silans-lan | le silence | the silence |

If the last sound is an oral vowel and is preceded by an oral consonant, it becomes a:

| Antillean Creole | French | English |
|---|---|---|
| kouto-a | le couteau | the knife |
| péyi-a | le pays | the country |
| mi-a | le maïs | the corn |

If a word ends in a nasal vowel, it becomes an:

| Antillean Creole | French | English |
|---|---|---|
| van-an | le vent | the wind |
| chyen-an | le chien | the dog |
| pon-an | le pont | the bridge |

If the last sound is a nasal consonant, it becomes nan, but this form is rare and is usually replaced by lan:

| Antillean Creole | French | English |
|---|---|---|
| machin-nan | la voiture | the car |
| machin-lan | la voiture | the car |
| moun-nan | les gens | the people |
| moun-lan | les gens | the people |
| fanm-nan | la femme | the woman |
| fanm-lan | la femme | the woman |

Note that in Guadeloupean Creole there is no agreement of sounds between the noun and definite article and la is used for all nouns

Demonstrative article

Like the definite article this is placed after the noun. It varies widely by region.

| Region | Demonstrative | Example | English |
|---|---|---|---|
| St.Lucia | sala sa'a | motoka sala | that/this car |
| Guadeloupe | lasa | boug lasa | that/this guy |
| Martinique | tala/taa | tab tala/taa | that/this table |

Verb Tenses
| Creole | Negative | Tense | | | | |
|---|---|---|---|---|---|---|
| ø | pa | Preterite/ Present Perfect | I vini | He came He has come | I pa vini | He didn't come He hasn't come |
| ka | pa ka pa'a | Present Progressive | Mwen ka palé Ng'a palé | I am speaking | Mwen pa ka palé Mwen pa'a palé M'a ka palé | I wasn't speaking |
| ké | pé ké | Future | Ou ké ay/alé | You will go | Ou pé ké ay/alé | I won't go |
| kay | pa kay | Immediate Future | Mwen kay alé Ng'ay alé | I'm going to go | Mwen pa kay alé M'a kay alé | I am not going |
| té | pa té | Past/ Past Perfect | Nou té di | We said We had said | Nou pa té di | We didn't say We hadn't said |
| té ka | pa té ka | Progressive Past | Zòt té ka manjé | Y'all were eating | Zòt pa té ka manjé | Y'all were not eating |
| té ké té'é | pa té ké | Conditional | Yo té ké enmen Yo té'é enmen | They would like | Yo pa té ké enmen Yo pa té'é enmen | They would not like |
| té kay/ké | pa té kay/ké | Conditional | An té kay/ké pran | I would take | An pa té kay/ké | I would not go |
| soti | | 'have just' | Man sòti rivé | I've just arrived | Man pa sòti rive | I have not just gone out |
| té soti | | 'had just' | Albè té sòti sòti | Albert had just gone out | Albè té sòti sòti | Albert had not just gone gone out |
| ja | p'oko po'o | 'already' | Sé timanmay-la ja fè | The children already did | Sé timanmay-la p'òkò fè Sé timanmay-la pò'ò fè | The children have not already done The children had not yet done |
| té ja | potoko/pokote | | Hò/zot té ja koumansé | Y'all had already started | Hò/zot potoko/pokote koumansé | Y'all had not already started Y'all had not started yet |

Verbs in Creole are invariable and unlike French or English have no inflection to distinguish tenses. A series of particles placed before the verb indicate tense and aspect. There is no Subjunctive mood.

== Vocabulary ==
The vocabulary of Antillean Creole is based mostly on French, with many contributions from West African languages, Spanish, English and Amerindian languages.

== Varieties ==
=== Martinican Creole French ===
Martinican Creole is widely spoken in Martinique which had mixed between French and African languages developed between the white settlers and the slaves from Africa who has settled in the New World. Martinique's history and its origin were the Arawaks that became the first known inhabitants along with the Carib tribes before the Spanish led by Christopher Columbus arrive in Martinique in 1502 and claimed it for Spain before handing over to the French in 1635 by King Louis XIV of France which affected as the Code Noir which tens of thousands of slaves from Africa were taken to the new French colony of Martinique. The elements of Martinican Creole was mixed with English, Spanish, Portuguese, Indian, African, Amerindian and other ethnic minorities as a mixture of blend like Haitian Creole and Louisiana Creole once the French settlers along with their African slaves became the heart of the French Caribbean. Martinican Creole is a regional language because the island has European, British, French, Spanish, Portuguese, Indians (Tamils), Blacks (Africans), Martinicans, Caribs and others. It is considered part of Overseas France and a European region which became an Overseas département on 19 March 1946. Martinique shares characteristics with both the Caribbean and Latin America as a whole, with various African language that develops Martinican Creole had bring more closely tied to the latter due to its French, Spanish and Latin connections with the black majority.

=== Dominican Creole French ===
Dominican Creole French is the generally-spoken language in Dominica. Its mutual intelligibility rate with other varieties of Antillean Creole is almost 100%. Its syntactic, grammatical and lexical features are virtually identical to that of Martinican Creole, but like its Saint Lucian counterpart, it has more English loanwords than the Martinican variety. People who speak Haitian Creole can also understand Dominican Creole French. Even though there are a number of distinctive features, they are mutually intelligible.

Like the other Caribbean Creoles, Dominican French Creole combines a syntax of African and Carib origin with a vocabulary primarily derived from French.

=== Saint Lucian Creole French ===
Saint Lucian French Creole is commonly spoken in Saint Lucia. Its syntactic, grammatical and lexical features are virtually identical to that of Martinican Creole.

Like the other Caribbean creoles, Saint Lucian French Creole combines a syntax of African and Carib origin with a vocabulary primarily derived from French. The language can be considered to be mutually intelligible with French creoles of the Lesser Antilles and is related to Haitian Creole, which has nonetheless a number of distinctive features.

It is still widely spoken in Saint Lucia. In the mid-19th century, migrants took the language with them to Panama, where it is now moribund.

=== Grenadian Creole French ===
Historically, French, or French Creole, was the language of the large majority of the inhabitants, enslaved Africans and estate owners. Though the new British administrators spoke English, French was still predominant.

Grenadian Creole French is a variety of Antillean Creole French. In Grenada and among Grenadians, it is referred to as Patois or French Patois. It was once the lingua franca in Grenada and was commonly heard as recently as the mid 1900s when many in rural areas could speak it. In the 21st century, it can be heard only among elderly speakers in a few small pockets of the country. They are becoming fewer and fewer because unlike St. Lucia and Dominica, which lie close to the French islands of Martinique and Guadeloupe, Grenada does not have Kwéyòl-speaking neighbours to keep the language alive.

Additionally, the language is not taught in schools.

=== Trinidadian French Creole ===
Trinidadian French Creole is a French Creole (Patois) of Trinidad spoken by descendants of the French Creole migrants from the French Antilles.

The Cedula of Population of 1783 laid the foundation and growth of the population of Trinidad. French planters and the Africans they enslaved, free coloureds and mulattos, from the French Antilles of Martinique, Grenada, Guadeloupe and Dominica, migrated to Trinidad during the French Revolution. The immigrants establishing local communities of Blanchisseuse, Champs Fleurs, Paramin, Cascade, Carenage, Laventille, etc. Trinidad's population, which numbered less than 1,400 in 1777, soared to over 15,000 by the end of 1789.

In 1797, Trinidad became a British crown colony, with a French-speaking and Patois-speaking population. Today, Trinidadian French Creole can be found spoken in regional pockets among the elders, particularly in the villages of Paramin and Lopinot.

== Example vocabulary ==
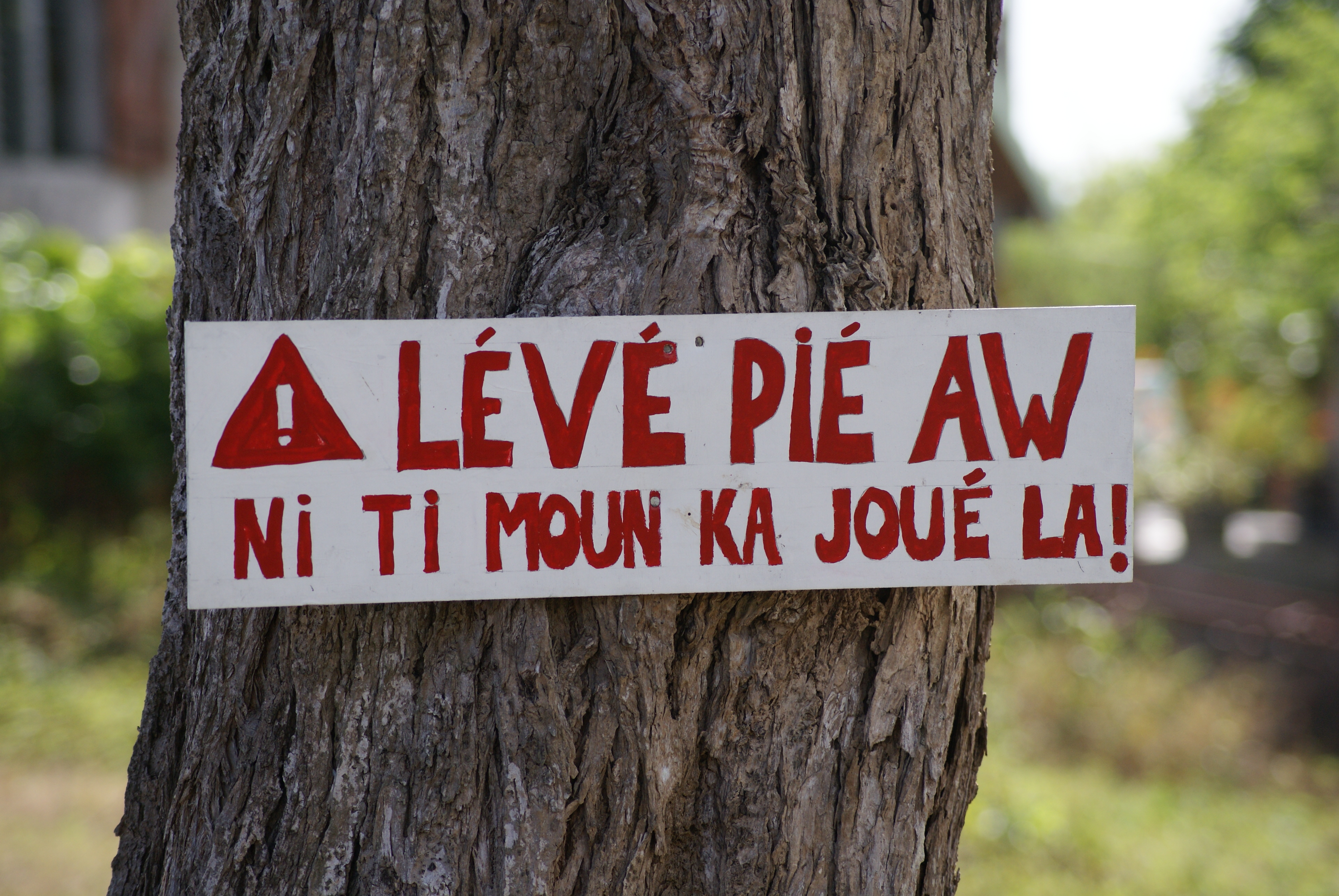
Road sign in residential area in Guadeloupe. Slow down. Children are playing here.

- Hello – Bonjou (from "bonjour") pronounced [bonʒu].
- Hello – Sa i di-a (more casual) pronounced [sa i di a].
- Please – Souplé (shortened version of "Si ou plé / Si'w plé") pronounced [suple].
- Thank you – Mèsi (from "merci") pronounced [mɛsi].
- Thank you very much – Mèsi an pil pronounced [mɛsi ɑ̃ pil], Mèsi an lo pronounced [mɛsi ɑ̃ lo], or Mèsi an chay' pronounced [mɛsi ɑ̃ ʃaj].
- Excuse me – Eskizé mwen (from "excusez-moi") pronounced [ɛskize mwɛ̃].
- Rain is falling – Lapli ka tonbé pronounced [lapli ka tɔ̃be], or Lapli ka bat' (stronger) pronounced [lapli ka bat], Lapli ap tonbé (Haitian) pronounced [lapli ap tɔ̃be].
- Today is a nice day – Jòdi-a bèl pronounced [ʒɔdi a bɛl]
- How are you ? – Ka'w fè? (Guadeloupe) pronounced [ka u fɛ], Sa'w fè? (Martinique) pronounced [sa u fɛ], Sa kap fèt? (Haitian) pronounced [sa kap fɛt] - often shortened to "Sakafèt'?" pronounced [sakafɛt].
- Brother, Sister - Frè pronounced [fwɛ], Sè pronounced [sɛ]
- Going to the beach – Ay (o)bòdlanmè-a pronounced [aj obɔdlɑ̃mɛa]
- My place - Akaz (an) mwen (Guadeloupe) pronounced [akaz ɑ̃ mwɛ̃], Lakay mwen (Martinique) pronounced [lakaj mwɛ̃]
- I don't care - Mpa kyè (Haitian) pronounced [mpa kjɛ], Man san fouté (FWI) pronounced [mɑ̃ sɑ̃ fute]
- Girlfriend (or female relative) - Manzèl pronounced [mɑ̃zɛl]
- Boyfriend (or male relative) - Boug pronounced [buɡ]
- (To) engage in a fight - Goumé épi moun pronounced [ɡume epi mun]

== Sample texts ==
Below are samples of St. Lucian Creole French taken from a folktale.

Pwenmyé ki pasé sé Konpè Kochon. I di, "Konpè Lapen, sa ou ka fè la?"

Konpè Lapen di'y, "Dé ti twou yanm ng'a (mwen ka) fouyé bay ich mwen pou mwen bay ich mwen manjé."

Konpè Kochon di, "Mé, Konpè, ou kouyon, wi! Ou vlé di mwen sa kay fè yanm?"

An English translation from the same source:

First to pass was Konpè Kochon (Mister Pig). He said, "Konpè Lapen (Mister Rabbit), what are you doing there?"

Konpè Lapen told him, "I am digging a few holes to plant yams to feed my children."

Konpè Kochon said, "But, Konpè, you're too foolish! You mean to tell me you can grow yams there?"
