= Culture of Saint Lucia =

The culture of Saint Lucia blends the influences of African, French, and English heritage. The official language of the island is English but Kwéyòl (French Creole) remains an influential secondary language with an English Creole spoken as well. The people are predominantly Catholic but the religious climate is tolerant.

== Festivals ==
Saint Lucia holds every year two main traditional festivals, La Woz ("The Rose", on August 30) and La Magwit ("The Marguerite", on October 17), organized by the two rival historic cultural associations (societés) with the same names whose affiliates comprise most of the country's population.

The Christmas season is celebrated and a number of small festivals and parades take place throughout the island.

Saint Lucia also celebrates a cultural festival known as Creole Day (Jounen Kwéyòl). This is celebrated each year on the last Sunday of October. On the Sunday of this week, the various towns chosen to host this festival put out the result of their grand preparations; local foods and drinks such as breadfruit, green fig, plantain, salt fish, king fish, manicou (opossum), roast pork, Johnny Cake (fried bake) and a famous dish, bouyon (fish, chicken or meat stewed with dasheen, yams, plantains, banana and dumplings), lime drinks, guava drinks and more. Most people commemorate this day by wearing the island's national wear known as the Madras. Persons who do not want to wear the extreme layers of skirts and dresses make clothing out of special plaid material.

Secular observances include an internationally renowned Jazz Festival. Beginning in 1991, this annual festival draws crowds of music-lovers from around the world.

== Music ==
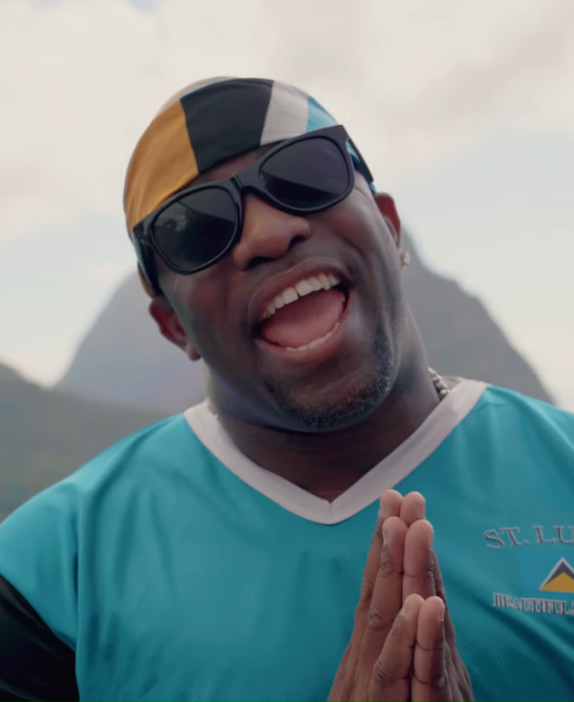
Saint Lucian artist Teddyson John

The musical culture of Saint Lucia includes an indigenous folk music tradition, as well as other Caribbean music genres such as Calypso, soca, zouk and reggae. Saint Lucia produces very high quantities of zouk music. Modern Saint Lucia today has produced artists/producers such as Mecca .Artists/producer also Lashley Winter also known as Motto Founder of TeamFoxx Music and Visuals, Teddyson John, Ricky T, Claudia Edwards, Shemmy J just to name a few.

== Cuisine ==
St Lucia's national dish is green banana (also called green fig) and saltfish.

The island's cuisine is a blend of West African, European (mainly British and French) and East Indian cuisine. This creates dishes such as macaroni pie, stew chicken, rice and peas, hearty fish broths or fish water, and soups made with fresh locally grown vegetables. St Lucian cuisine is similar to many other Commonwealth Caribbean nations such as Dominica, Jamaica, neighboring St Vincent and Trinidad. Typical essential foodstuffs are potatoes, onions, celery, thyme, coconut milk, the very hot Scotch bonnet peppers, flour and cornmeal. All mainstream meat and poultry are eaten in St Lucia. Meat and seafood are normally stewed and browned to create a rich gravy sometimes served over ground provisions or rice. Due to influences from the island's small Indo-Caribbean population, curry is popular. However, due to the blend of cooking styles, curry dishes exhibit Caribbean influence. In recent years, roti, a flatbread of Indian origin, has become popular, being imported from the twin island nation of Trinidad and Tobago to the south. This bread is typically served as a fast-food snack. The bread itself is very flat (sometimes very thin) and is wrapped around curried vegetables such as chickpeas, potatoes, or meat.

== Art and Literature ==
Prominent art

Saint Lucian writer Derek Walcott, the Nobel laureate in literature in 1992, was known for his poetry on West Indian culture.

Dunstan St. Omer was a Saint Lucian artist who was knighted in the 2010 for his services to art; he designed the national flag of Saint Lucia.

== Carnival ==
Traditionally, in common with other Caribbean countries, Saint Lucia held a carnival before Lent. In 1999, it was moved to mid-July so as not to clash with the much larger Trinidad and Tobago carnival, and in effort to attract more overseas visitors. It is a two-day festival where people walk about two miles. Before carnival, there is a competition among women in the country to find the queen of carnival.

== Sport ==
Another popular sport in Saint Lucia is Football. Football played all over the island as well as cricket. Darren Sammy is the former captain of the west Indies Cricket team. St.Lucia is home to 2024 Olympic 100m gold medalist and 200m silver medalist Julien Alfred

== See also ==
- Religion in Saint Lucia
