= Konbit =

Haitian Creole term for co-operation

Konbit (also spelled coumbite) is a Haitian Creole term for a Creole word for co-operation. A Haitian traditional form of communal working group in a sociopolitical sense. Commonly used as an agricultural group, political action, community patrol, arts and dance groups. It is similar to barn raising in North America. A related type of communal work is a kóve.

== Etymology ==
The Spanish word "convite" is used in the Dominican Republic in a somewhat similar way. The word "convite" means invite, a board or "junta" in that context.

== Use ==
The term is used in the names of some Haitian and diaspora NGOs, and even of several Haitian political parties.

=== As a dance ===
Kombit
- Native name: Haitian Creole: Koumbite
- Genre: Haitian Vodou
- Origin: Kingdom of Dahomey dokpwe
- Related dances: Rada Rite (Zepaule, Nago, Mahi, Ibo)

It can also refer to a style of Haitian music and dance associated with work parties, possibly being a form of influence on Rara music, and the sense of solidarity has also been compared to that of hip-hop culture.
Kombit dancers (Dance troupes) perform at all facets of events and festivals of society.

== See also ==
- Societies of Saint Lucia
- Mutualism
- Collectivism
- Collective action
