= Tetela de Ocampo =

Coordinates: 19°49′N 97°48′W

- town
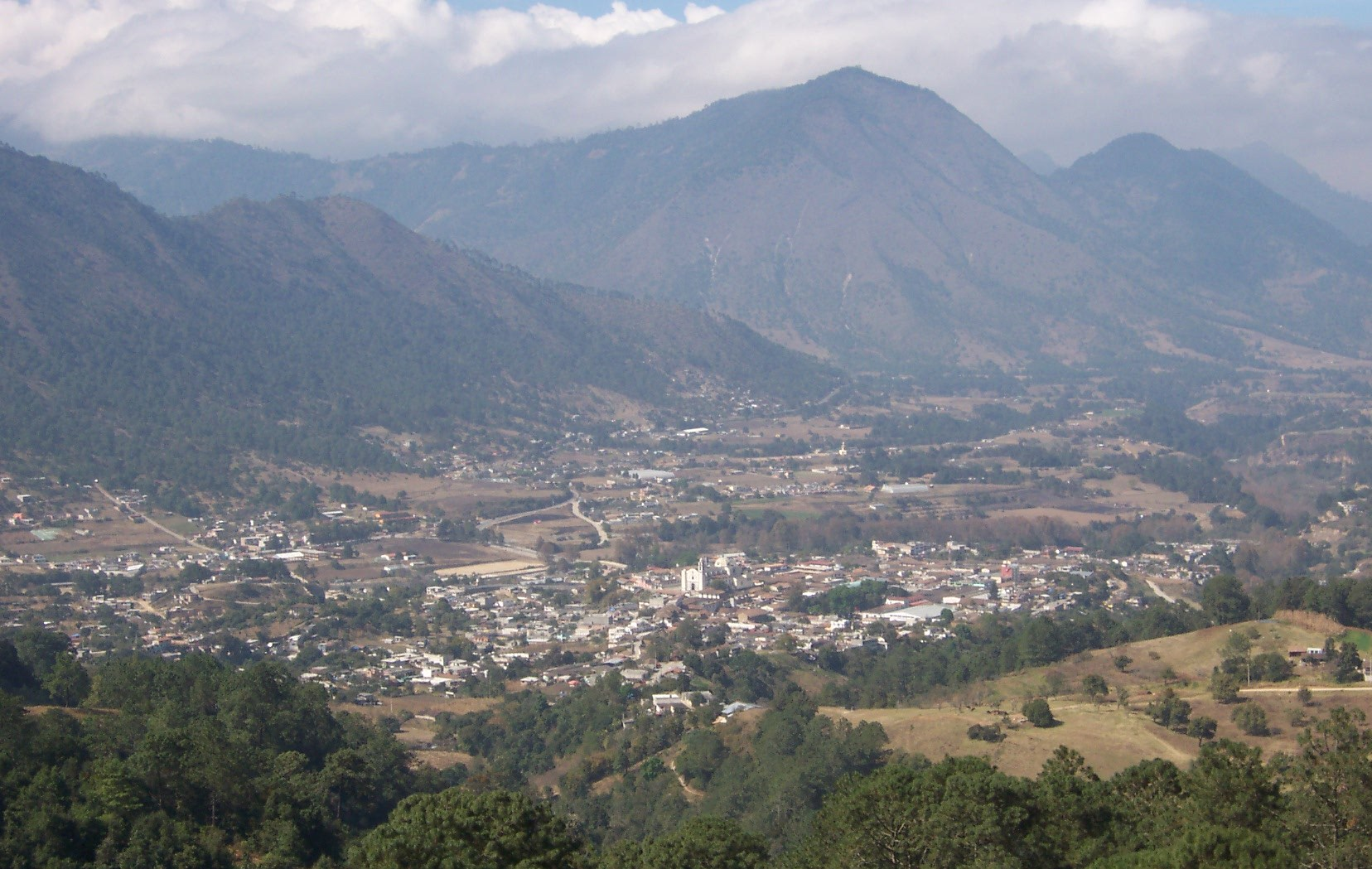

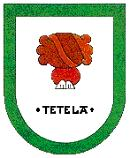
- Seal
- Interactive map of Tetela de Ocampo
- Country: Mexico
- State: Puebla

Government
  - Mayor: Juan Cruz Atolito (PRI)
- Time zone: UTC-6 (Central Standard Time)

Tetela de Ocampo is a town in Tetela de Ocampo Municipality in the Sierra Norte region of the Mexican state of Puebla. "Tetela" is a name of Nahuatl origin, containing the elements tetl (hill) and tla (many): it thus means "place of many hills". Nahuas still inhabit the area.

The BUAP has a Regional Section there.

== History ==
The settlement was founded in 1219 by four tribes of Chichimecas who came from the west. The leaders of the four tribes established dynastic lines that continued until the Spanish conquest. Tetela was ruled by a tlatoani, and each calpulli had a tequitlato that organized tequio and collected tribute (consisting of mantas, cotton, birds, deer, rabbits, cotton, maize, chilies, beans, and slaves captured in war). Nahuatl was the main language here, although Totonac was also spoken in the region. The merchants of Tetela sold amole, and gold was also available nearby. Trade flourished in the area, allowing the appearance of luxury items like precious stones, feathers, copal and cotton. The people of Tetela worshipped Huitzilopochtli, though it is unclear whether this was due to Mexica influence. Tetela was apparently incorporated into the Aztec Empire through peaceful, diplomatic means, and became the center of a strategic province. Tetela fought flower wars against Zacatlán and Tlaxcala. The Mexica supported Tetela with military supplies, and Tetela in return sent captives to Tenochtitlan.

Tetela was formerly known as Tetela del Oro because there was a gold mine in a nearby local town called La Cañada. In the past, gold coins were minted in Tetela.

On 23 June 1861 it was given the status of a town (villa), with the "Ocampo" honorific for Melchor Ocampo, who had been assassinated earlier that month.

In August 1865, during the French Intervention, it was the scene of fighting between Republicans (led by, local son and later President of Mexico, general Juan Nepomuceno Méndez) and Austro-Hungarian cavalry under de command of General Tancred de La Salla. The Mexican force retreated to the upper hills of Moracco where they were met by the enforcements of Juan Francisco Lucas.

The remains of Hacienda de Taxcantla, the trenches across the Rio Apulco bridge, the two campaign cannons taken from the Austro-Hungarian Corps in downtown Tetela, and the oral local history tradition of its people still remember us about the heroism of the Sierra Norte native people during the French Intervention war.

Nowadays, there is a local museum called Museo de Los Tres Juanes which displays a number of artifacts ranging from the Pre-Columbian up to the Mexican Revolution periods.

== The town ==
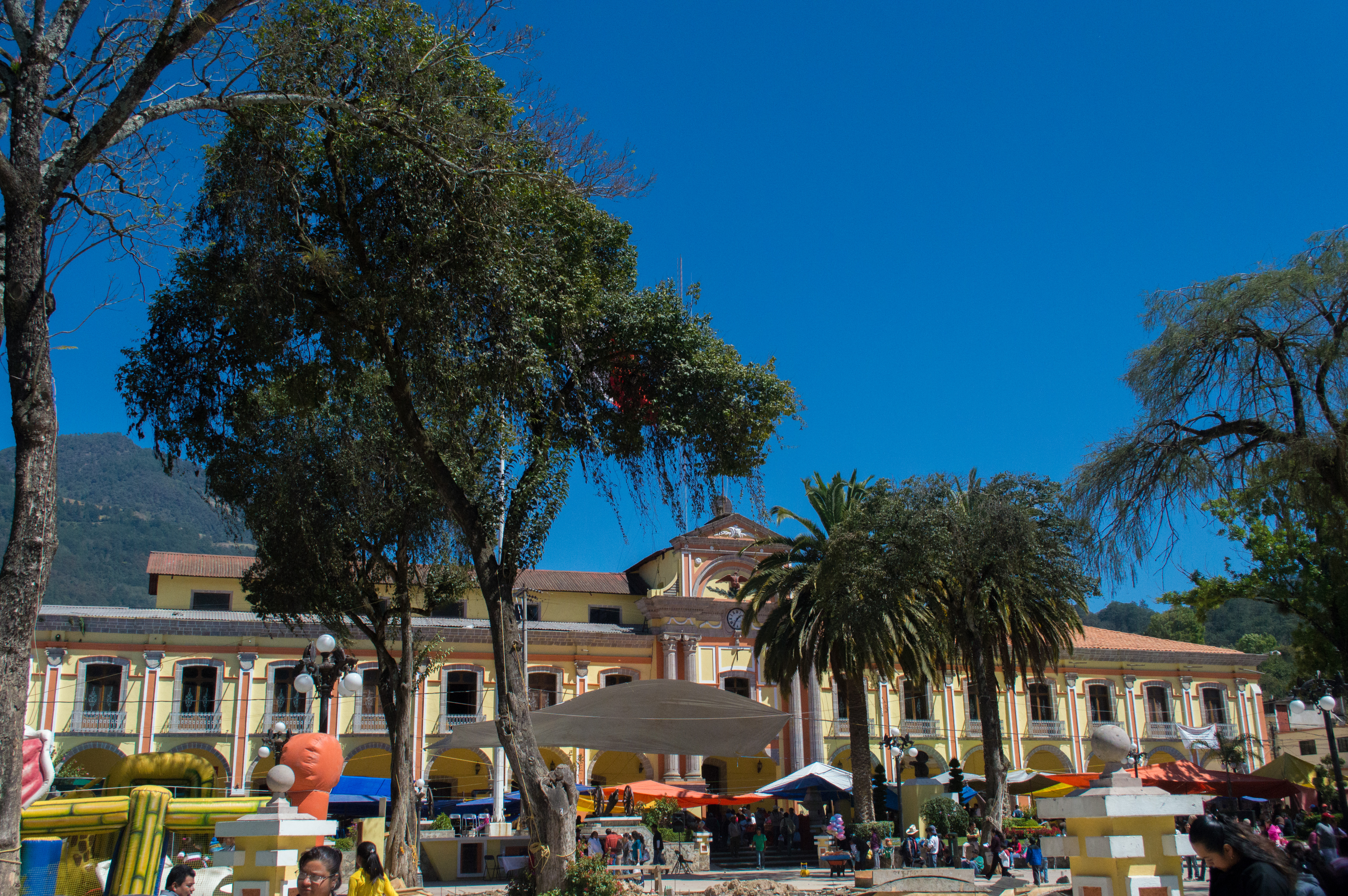
Municipal palace in Tetela de Ocampo

The Parish of Nuestra Señora de la Asunción was built in 1808 and is the tallest building in the town. It faces the main plaza where the municipal palace is also found. This palace was built in the French style that was popular in the late 19th and early 20th centuries. Inside if the Los Tres Juanes Museum, named in honor of the three generals from here who fought against the French in Battle of Puebla.

On a hill above the town Is a monumental cross and a lookout point which gives a good view of the town and the surrounding mountains. The cross was erected here in 1969 by the Los Josefinos Mission.

Just outside the town proper is the hacienda of artist Rafael Bonilla, which is known to all the locals and located at the foot of the Juárez Hill. Visitors are greeted by sculptures of Nahua gods, created by the artist. There is a gallery here which contains a collection of Bonilla's works as well as works by other artists from Tetela.

== The municipality ==
In the nearby community of Xaltempa de Lucas are the Aconco waterfalls, which is not often visited. In Carreragco are located the Grutas de Acocomoca, a cave system which was discovered only a decade ago. Today, it has a small "eco-hotel," which provides tours through the caves. Visitors to the caves are required to wear hard hats, with lamps and a change of clothes recommended.

La Cañada is a small mining town, where the remains of sulfur and gold mines can still be seen and smelled. In Cuapancingo, there is an ancient bridge called the Bridge of Nanahuacingo.

== Notable people ==
- Juan N. Méndez (1824-1894), president of Mexico from December 6,1876 to February 17,1877
