= Ayni =

Concept of reciprocity in Andean cultures

Ayni (Quechua and Aymara; also spelled Ayniy or Aini) can refer to either the concept of reciprocity or mutualism among people of the Andean mountain communities or the practice of this concept. The practice of ayni is largely based on a system of giving and receiving gifts to maintain the balance of relationships.

While ayni is most frequently discussed in terms of the relationship humans have with each other and the relationships humans have with divinities such as apu or Pachamama, it also governs the relationships humans have with their ancestors, the natural world, and relationships between non-humans. The concept of ayni indicates that everything in the world is connected through a vital flow.

As a verb, this often refers to the cooperation between the members of a community when one member gives to another, he or she is entitled to receive something back. Well-known practitioners of ayni include the Quechuas and Aymara, as well as numerous other tribes that live in the Peru, Ecuador, and Bolivia.

== Ayni as a noun ==
In communities like the Q'ero, five principles define the Andean way of life: munay (to love), yachay (to learn, know, and remember), llan'kay (to work), kawsay (life), and ayni (reciprocity). Among them, ayni is regarded as the most important principle, as it provides the backbone of life. This is because ayni is not limited to being compensated for earlier help; a more broad definition of ayni would be the exchange of energy between humans, nature, and the universe.

Geremia Cometti gives an example of ayni in practice with a Hatun Q'ero man named Guillermo. When Guillermo noticed that Cometti was gathering the potato skins he dropped to the floor while they were cooking, he scolded her and asked if she slept with the dead. When she said she did not, he explained,

“Then, if you say you don’t sleep with the dead, … why did you put the dead skins [those we had cooked in the pan] with those that were still alive [those of the raw potatoes that we had peeled before cooking them in the soup]?" “Indeed,” Guillermo continued, “the skins we have cooked have lost their spirit, whilst the others still have their animu [spirit]. There are rules to follow, to cultivate and cook potatoes. There is an ayni relationship between the potatoes and us. We have to treat it the way it wants to be treated. If we don’t follow these rules, then we won’t be allowed to cultivate it anymore.”

— Guillermo, interviewed by Geremia Cometti, A Cosmopolitical Ethnography of a Changing Climate among the Q'ero of the Peruvian Andes, page 45

== Ayni as a verb ==
In practice, Quechua and Aymara communities apply ayni through human to human interaction. This is thought to have originated from the harsh climate of the Andean mountain region and the mutualism thus demanded for the survival of the people living there.

Members of a community help other members for private purposes when support is needed for activities such as construction and planting. Participants are supplied with food and drink by the hosting party. The party that was helped returns the favor by assisting those who helped them or others in need of aid, completing the reciprocity.

This is not to be confused with Mink'a, also native to the Andean region, in which participants are typically paid for services such as harvesting crops.

== Similar concepts ==
There are many concepts globally that show similarity to ayni. While none of them are exactly the same as ayni, they all show mutualism to a certain extent.

- Barn raising (North American)
- Bayanihan (Filipino)
- Bee (North American, Australian)
- Dugnad (Norwegian)
- Gadugi (Cherokee)
- Kaláka (Hungarian)
- Gotong-royong (Indonesian, Malaysian)
- Harambee (Kenyan)
- Imece (Turkish)
- Meitheal (Irish)
- Mink'a (Andean)
- Moba (Serbian)
- Naffir (Sudanese)
- Talkoot (Finnish)
