= Danielle de St. Jorre =

Seychellois politician

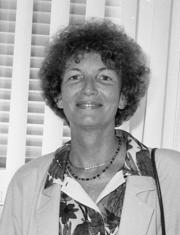
- Born: 30 September 1941
- Died: 25 February 1997 (aged 55)
- Occupation: Politician

Danielle Marie-Madeleine Jorre de St Jorre (30 September 1941 – 25 February 1997) was a Seychelles politician. She was the foreign minister of Seychelles under President France-Albert René from 1989 until her death in 1997. Danielle de St Jorre was a teacher by profession and also a linguist. She was known as a pioneer in the promotion of Creole language. Her passion and determination to ensure the development of Seychellois Creole was known in the Indian Ocean island nation.

Danielle de St Jorre was Minister for Foreign Affairs, the Environment and Tourism of the Republic of Seychelles and a member of International Ocean Institute Governing Board.

In 2015, the United Nations on 28 October, set aside International Creole Day. Danielle de St Jorre was recognised for her work to get the Creole language and culture where it is today. Creole is one of the three official languages of Seychelles. Seychelles was colonised by the French and British at different times, Seychelles eventually adopted French and English along with Creole as the three official languages. She was instrumental in the development of Seychelles Kreol and helped to develop partnership with people from the Creole-speaking world. She organised a Creole week in 1982.
