= Quadrille dress =

Caribbean traditional dress

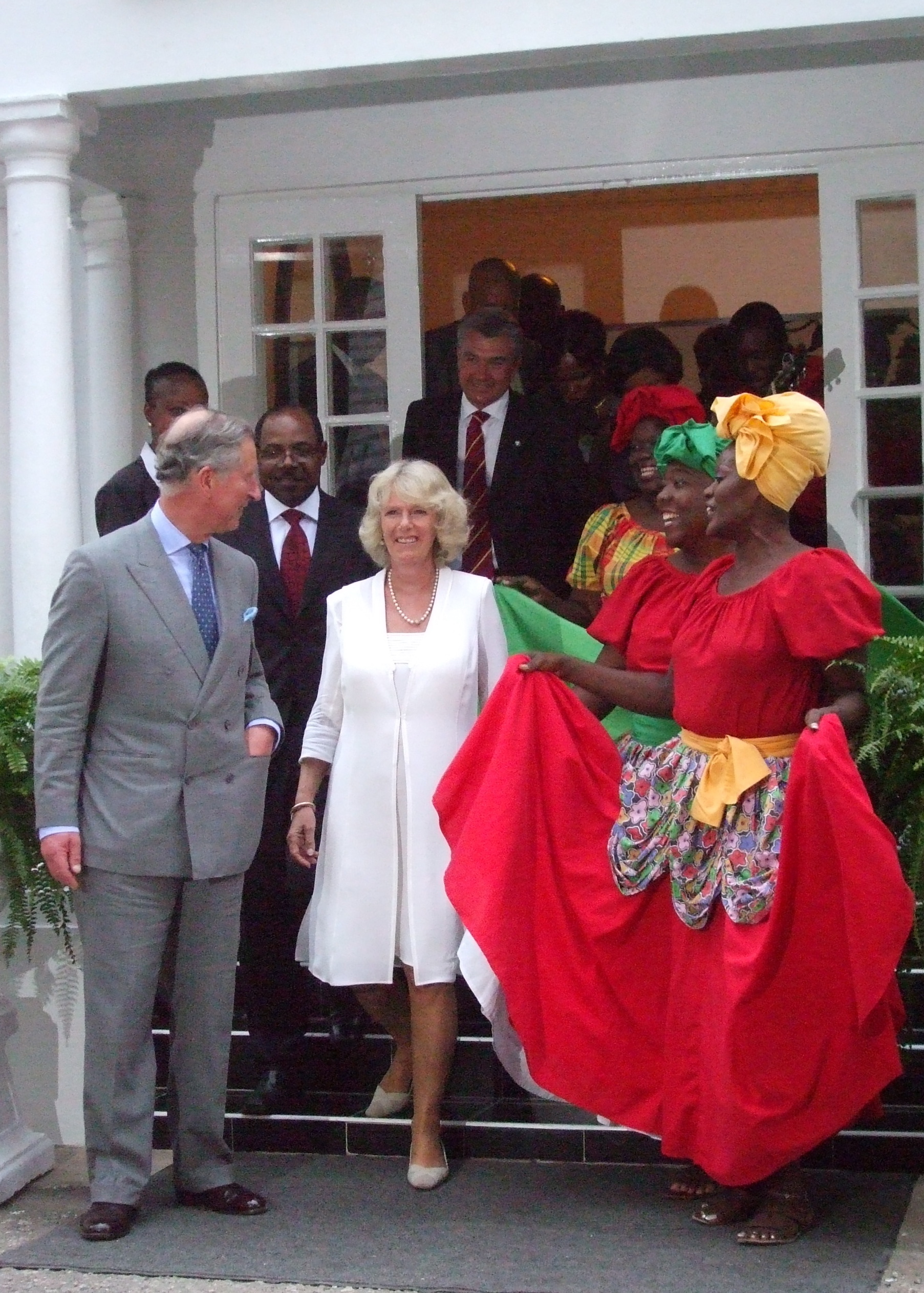
Women wearing the quadrille dress greet King Charles III and Queen Camilla in Jamaica.

A quadrille dress is a traditional folk costume worn by women in several Caribbean countries. Commonly associated with the quadrille dance, the dress varies in design and name depending on the country, and it may also be worn during cultural celebrations and festivals.

== Jamaica ==
In Jamaica, the quadrille dress is referred to as a bandana skirt and is typically made from cotton in a checked or plaid pattern, often incorporating red, white, and blue madras fabric. It is usually worn with a ruffled blouse and a matching head tie. This ensemble is recognized as part of Jamaica’s national costume.

Although quadrille dancing is less common today, it is still performed in cultural presentations and festivals. Male performers may wear a matching madras shirt with white trousers when participating in traditional folk performances, particularly within the tourism sector.

The bush jacket, sometimes mistakenly viewed as traditional, was introduced in the 1970s primarily for political purposes and is not part of the historic folk costume. At formal events such as weddings, modern Western attire—such as suits and white gowns—is typically worn.

== Haiti ==
A dancer wearing a Karabela

In Haiti, the quadrille dress is known as the karabela dress in Haitian Creole. It is often worn during traditional dances and formal celebrations. Men commonly wear a linen guayabera or similar shirt jacket as part of formal or festive attire.

== Saint Lucia ==
In Saint Lucia, the equivalent attire is referred to as the Kwadril dress. It is associated with performances of the traditional kwadril dance and cultural heritage events.

== See also ==
- Guayabera
- Kariba suit
- Madras (costume)
- National costume
