= Communal work =

Gathering for mutually accomplishing a task or for fundraising

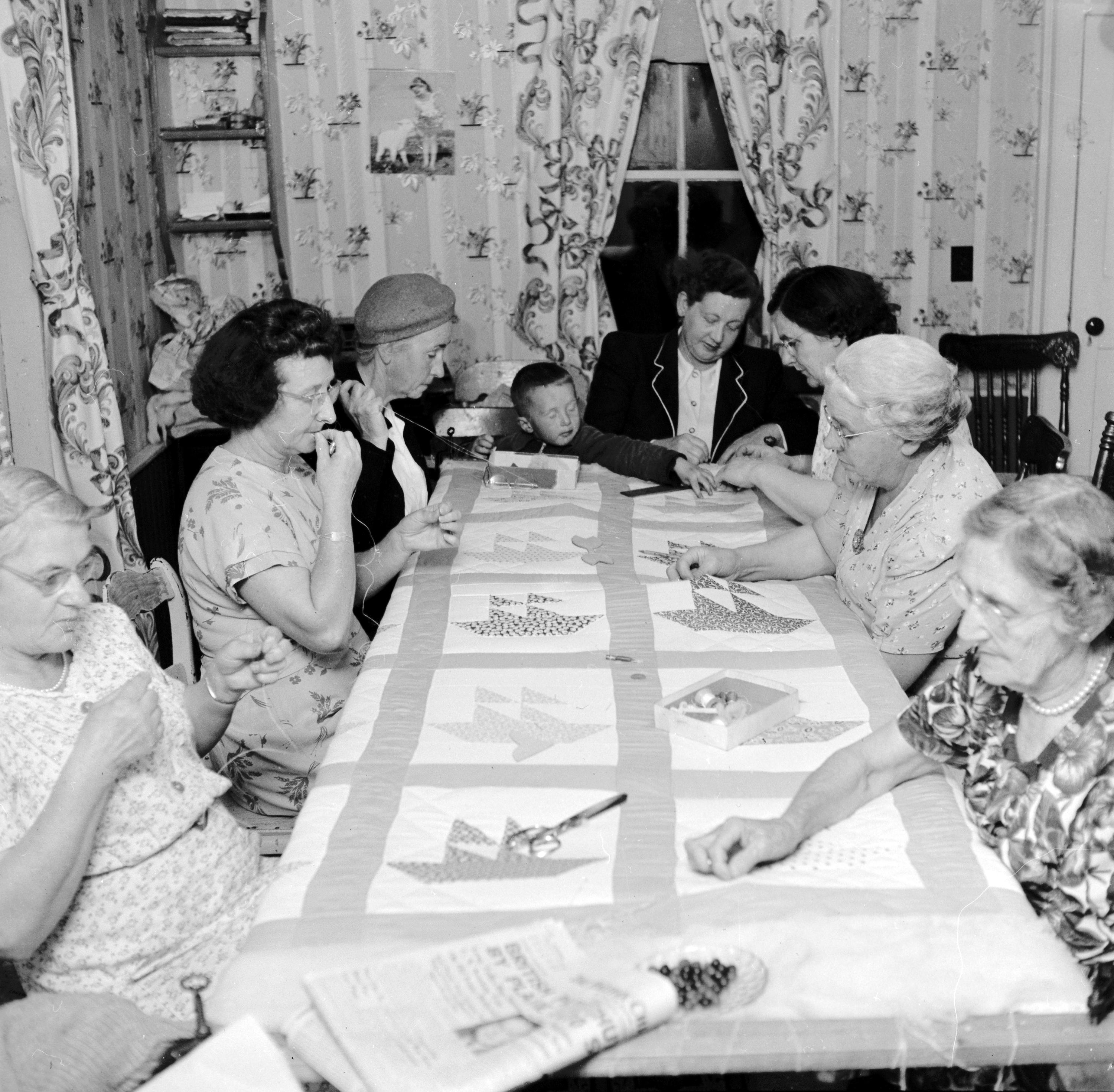
A quilting bee is a form of communal work.

Communal work is a gathering for mutually accomplishing a task or for communal fundraising. Communal work provided manual labour to others, especially for major projects such as barn raising, "bees" of various kinds (see § Bee below), log rolling, and subbotniks. Different words have been used to describe such gatherings.

They are less common in today's more individualistic cultures, where there is less reliance on others than in preindustrial agricultural and hunter-gatherer societies. Major jobs such as clearing a field of timber or raising a barn needed many workers. It was often both a social and utilitarian event. Jobs like corn husking or sewing could be done as a group to allow socializing during an otherwise tedious chore. Such gatherings often included refreshments and entertainment.

The word bee is also sometimes used for other social gatherings without communal work, for example for competitions such as a spelling bee.

== In specific cultures ==
=== Africa ===
==== East Africa ====
Harambee (Swahili: [hɑrɑˈᵐbɛː]) is an East African (Kenyan, Tanzanian and Ugandan) tradition of community self-help events, e.g. fundraising or development activities. Harambee literally means 'all pull together' in Swahili, and is also the official motto of Kenya and appears on its coat of arms.

==== Rwanda ====
Umuganda is a national day of community service held on the last Saturday of each month in Rwanda. In 2009, umuganda, which means "coming together in common purpose" in Kinyarwanda, was institutionalized in the country. It is translated as 'coming together in common purpose to achieve an outcome'.

==== Ethiopia ====
A social event is held to build a house or a farm, especially for elderly and widows who do not have the physical strength to do it on their own.

==== Sudan ====
Naffīr (نَفِّير) is an Arabic word used in parts of Sudan (including Kordofan, Darfur, parts of the Nuba Mountains and Kassala) to describe particular types of communal work undertakings. Naffīr has been described as including a group recruited through family networks, in-laws and village neighbors for some particular purpose, which then disbands when that purpose is fulfilled. An alternative, more recent, definition describes naffīr as 'to bring someone together from the neighborhood or community to carry out a certain project, such as building a house or providing help during the harvest season'.

The word may be related to the standard Arabic word nafr (نَفْر) which describes a band, party, group or troop, typically mobilized for war. In standard Arabic, a naffīr ʽāmm (نَفِّير عَامّ) refers to a general call to arms.

Naffīr has also been used in a military context in Sudan. For example, the term was used to refer to النَّفِّير الشَّعَبِي an-Naffīr aš-Šaʽabī or "the People's Militias" that operated in the central Nuba Mountains region in the early 1990s.

==== Liberia ====
Kuu is a labor-sharing arrangement in Liberia, especially for seasonal work.

=== Asia ===
==== Indonesia ====
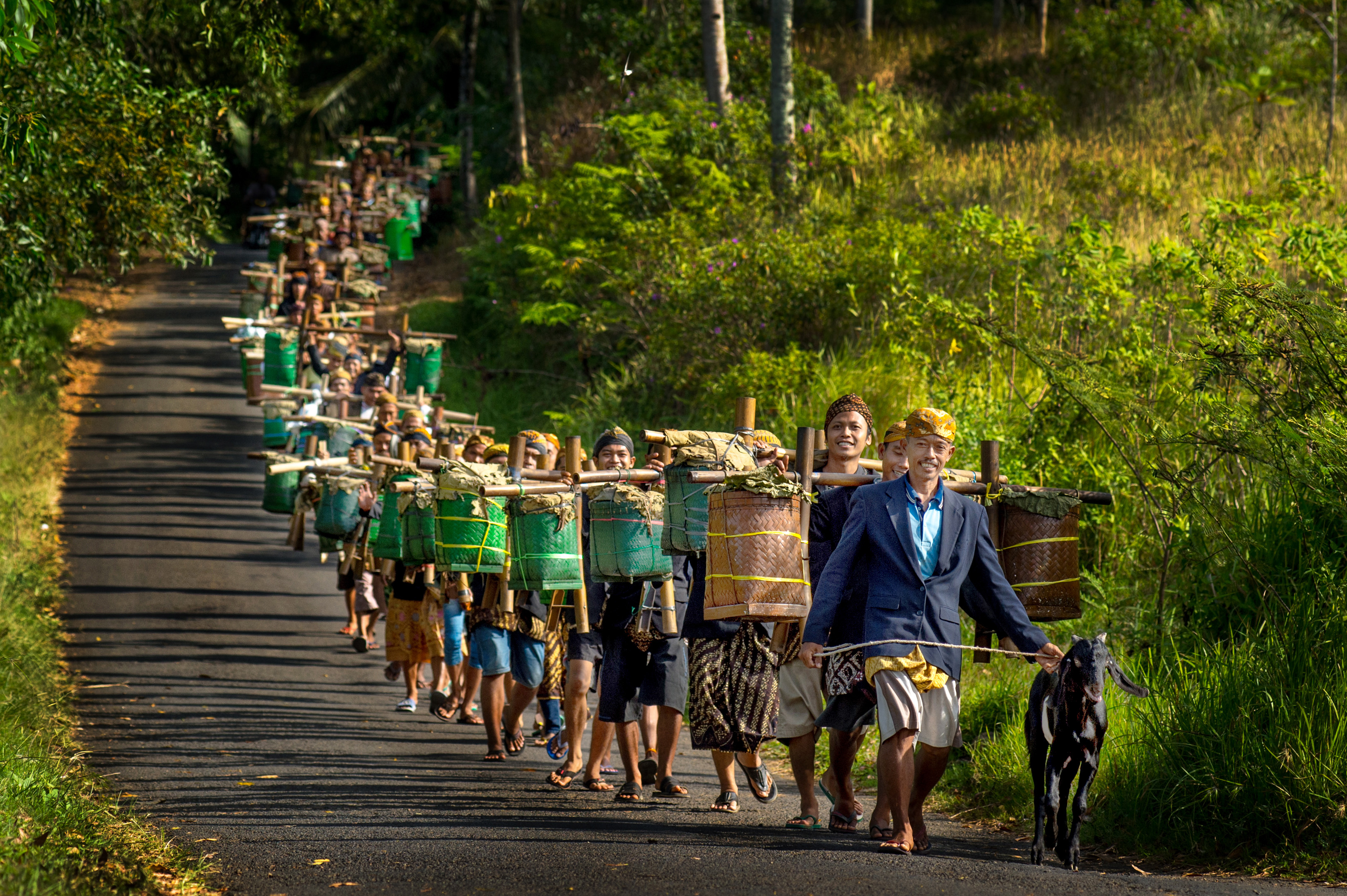
The traditional communal slametan unggahan ceremony of Bonokeling village, Banyumas, Central Java, in which the participants literally perform the notion of gotong royong (carrying together).

Gotong-royong (IPA: [ɡo.toŋ ro.joŋ]) is a conception of sociality ethos familiar to Indonesia. In Indonesian languages especially Javanese, gotong means 'carrying a burden using one's shoulder', while royong means 'together' or 'communally', thus the combined phrase gotong royong can be translated literally as 'joint bearing of burdens'. It translate to working together, helping each other or mutual assistance. The village's public facilities, such as irrigation, streets, and houses of worship (mosque, church or pura) are usually constructed through gotong royong, where the funds and materials are collected mutually. Traditional communal events, such as the slametan ceremony, are also usually held in the gotong royong ethos of communal work spirit, which each member of society is expected to contribute to and participate in the endeavour harmoniously.

The phrase has been translated into English in many ways, most of which hearken to the conception of reciprocity or mutual aid. For M. Nasroen, gotong royong forms one of the core tenets of Indonesian philosophy. Paul Michael Taylor and Lorraine V. Aragon state that "gotong royong [is] cooperation among many people to attain a shared goal."

===== Background =====
In a 1983 essay Clifford Geertz points to the importance of gotong royong in Indonesian life:

An enormous inventory of highly specific and often quite intricate institutions for effecting the cooperation in work, politics, and personal relations alike, vaguely gathered under culturally charged and fairly well indefinable value-images—rukun ('mutual adjustment'), gotong royong ('joint bearing of burdens'), tolong-menolong ('reciprocal assistance')—governs social interaction with a force as sovereign as it is subdued.

Anthropologist Robert A. Hahn writes:

Javanese culture is stratified by social class and by level of adherence to Islam. ...Traditional Javanese culture does not emphasize material wealth. ...There is respect for those who contribute to the general village welfare over personal gain. And the spirit of gotong royong, or volunteerism, is promoted as a cultural value.

Gotong - royong has long functioned as the scale of the village, as a moral conception of the political economy. Pottier records the impact of the Green Revolution in Java:

"Before the GR, 'Java' had relatively 'open' markets, in which many local people were rewarded in kind. With the GR, rural labour markets began to foster 'exclusionary practices'... This resulted in a general loss of rights, especially secure harvesting rights within a context of mutual cooperation, known as gotong royong."

Citing Ann Laura Stoler's ethnography from the 1970s, Pottier writes that cash was replacing exchange, that old patron-client ties were breaking, and that social relations were becoming characterized more by employer-employee qualities.

===== Political appropriation =====
For Prime Minister Muhammad Natsir, gotong royong was an ethical principle of sociality, in marked contrast to both the "unchecked" feudalism of the West, and the social anomie of capitalism.

Ideas of reciprocity, ancient and deeply enmeshed aspects of kampung morality, were seized upon by postcolonial politicians. John Sidel writes: "Ironically, national-level politicians drew on "village conceptions of adat and gotong royong. They drew on notions "of traditional community to justify new forms of authoritarian rule."

During the presidency of Sukarno, the idea of gotong royong was officially elevated to a central tenet of Indonesian life. For Sukarno, the new nation was to be synonymous with gotong royong. He said that the Pancasila could be reduced to the idea of gotong royong. On June 1, 1945, Sukarno said of the Pancasila:

The first two principles, nationalism and internationalism, can be pressed to one, which I used to call 'socionationalism.' Similarly with democracy 'which is not the democracy of the West' together with social justice for all can be pressed down to one, and called socio democracy. Finally – belief in God. 'And so what originally was five has become three: socio nationalism, socio democracy, and belief in God.' 'If I press down five to get three, and three to get one, then I have a genuine Indonesian term – GOTONG ROYONG [mutual co-operation]. The state of Indonesia which we are to establish should be a state of mutual co-operation. How fine that is ! A Gotong Royong state!

In 1960, Sukarno dissolved the elected parliament and implemented the Gotong Royong Parliament. Governor of Jakarta, Ali Sadikin, spoke of a desire to reinvigorate urban areas with village sociality, with gotong royong. Suharto's New Order was characterized by much discourse about tradition. During the New Order, Siskamling harnessed the idea of gotong royong. By the 1990s, if not sooner, gotong royong had been "fossilized" by New Order sloganeering. The government cabinet under the presidency of Megawati Sukarnoputri was named the Mutual Assistance Cabinet (Kabinet Gotong Royong), which lasted from 10 August 2001 to 20 October 2004.

==== Philippines ====
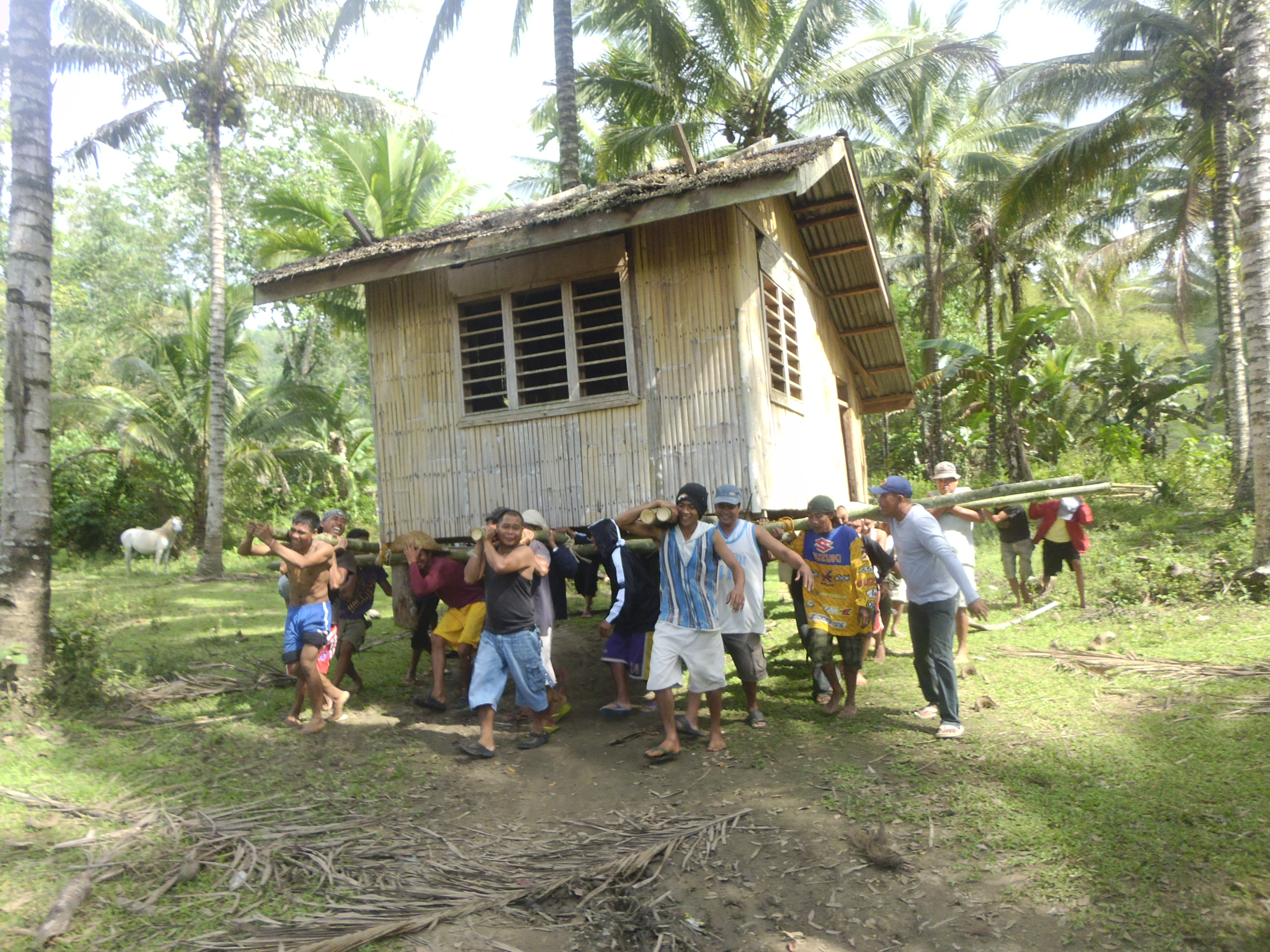
Members of the community volunteering to move a house to new location. Though no longer commonplace, this method of moving houses has become a traditional symbol for the concept of bayanihan.

Bayanihan (/baɪənihən/, IPA: [ˌbajɐˈnihan]) is a Filipino term taken from the word bayan, referring to a nation, country, town or community. The whole term bayanihan refers to a spirit of communal unity or effort to achieve a particular objective. It is focused on doing things as a group as it relates to one's community.

===== Etymology =====
The term bayanihan originated in the practice of volunteers from a community helping a family move by carrying the house itself, a tradition which remains the classic illustration for the concept as a whole. The feat is accomplished by building a frame from bamboo poles, which individuals stationed at the ends of each pole then use to lift and carry the house. The family traditionally shows their gratitude for the assistance by hosting a small fiesta.

===== Usage =====
In society, bayanihan has been adopted as a term to refer to a local civil effort to resolve national issues. One of the first groups to use the term is the Bayanihan Philippine National Folk Dance Company which travels to countries to perform traditional folk dances of the country with the objective of promoting Philippine culture. The concept is related to damayán ('to help one another').

In computing, the term bayanihan has evolved into many meanings and incorporated as codenames to projects that depict the spirit of cooperative effort involving a community of members. An example of these projects is the Bayanihan Linux project which is a Philippines-based desktop-focused Linux distribution.

Filipino author Rhadson Mendoza and communication media law and ethics professor DC Alviar cited a case where bayanihan was brought into disrepute as they reflected on a publicity stunt of takoyaki store Taragis whose owner offered a prize for anybody showing a tattooed logo of the store on their forehead. The store owner would later claim that the prize-winning man needed more money and their April Fool's Day joke led netizens to "join bayanihan" which was wrong on many levels, according to Mendoza and Alviar.

In ethnic newspapers, Bayanihan News is the name of the community newspaper for the Philippine community in Australia. It is in English and in Filipino with regular news and articles on Philippine current events and history. It was established in October 1998 in Sydney, Australia.

==== Iran ====
Basij was created after the Islamic Revolution and during the Iran and Iraq wars. It was an organization which aimed to gather volunteers for fighting in the frontline. It was also a central idea of utilizing donations and volunteers to help the soldiers and bringing aid to the frontline. Women played a big role by knitting warm clothes, making foods, sewing new uniforms or religious accessories. Basij's aim and goals have been shifted and distorted after the war; after the war ended the Basij organization continue working as a center to spread ideologies of the Islamic revolution in schools and mosques. Basij now is part of the Sepah army (military, cultural and financial) organization which receives an undefined budget from the government.

==== Turkey ====
Imece is a name given for a traditional Turkish village-scale collaboration. For example, if a couple is getting married, villagers participate in the overall organization of the ceremony including but not limited to preparation of the celebration venue, food, building and settlement of the new house for the newly weds. Tasks are often distributed according to expertise and has no central authority to govern activities.

=== Europe ===
==== Finland & the Baltics ====
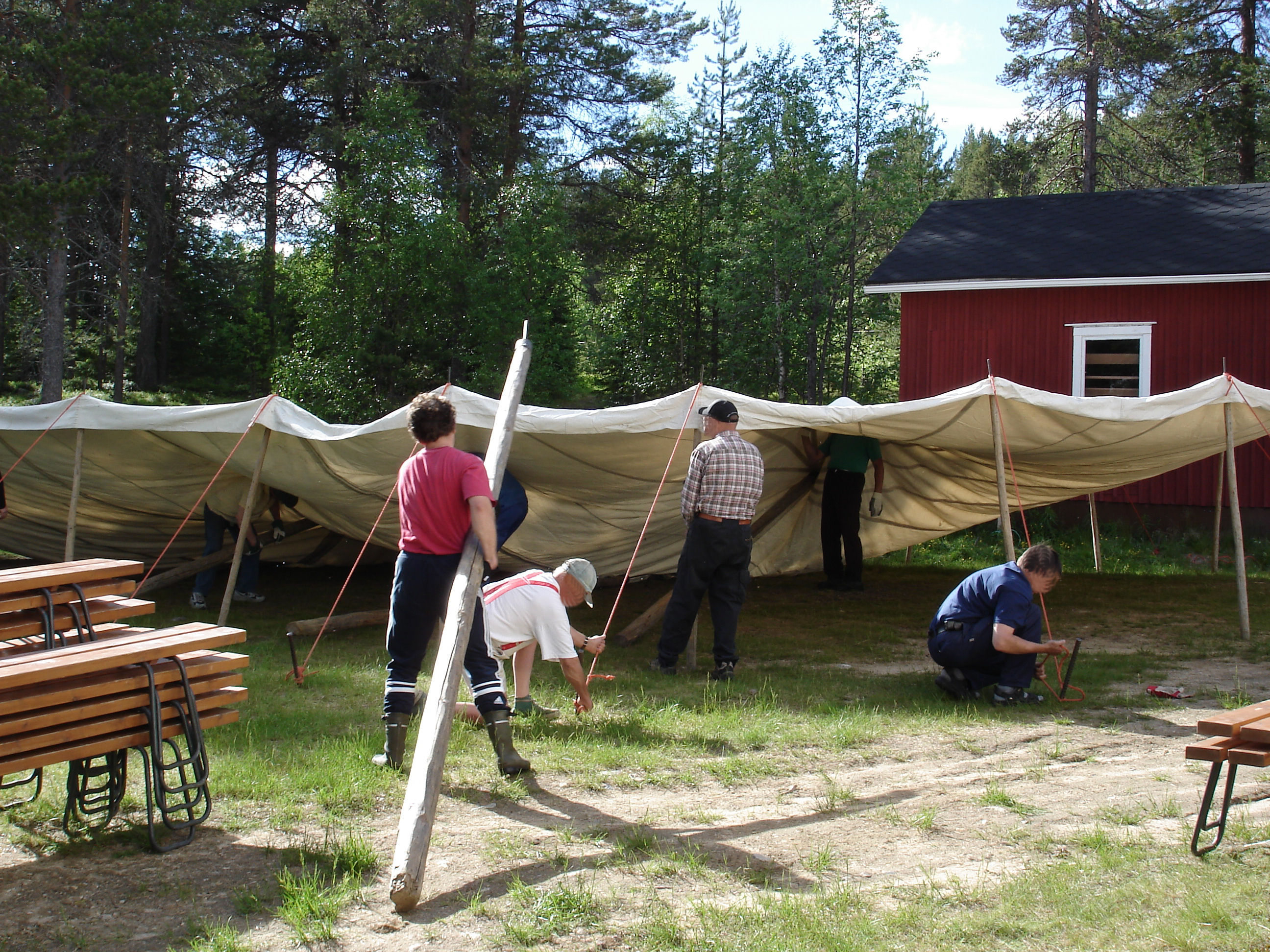
A tent is being raised in a talkoot for midsummer in Ylimuonio in 2005.

Talkoot (from Finnish talkoo, almost always used in plural, talkoot) is a Finnish expression for a gathering of friends and neighbors organized to accomplish a task. The word is borrowed into Finland Swedish as talko but is unknown to most Swedes. However, cognate terms and in approximately the same context are used in Estonia (talgu(d)), Latvia (noun talka, verb talkot), and Lithuania (noun talka, verb talkauti). It is the cultural equivalent of communal work in a village community, although adapted to the conditions of Finland, where most families traditionally lived in isolated farms often miles away from the nearest village.

A talkoot is by definition voluntary, and the work is unpaid. The voluntary nature might be imaginary due to social pressure, especially in small communities, and one's honour and reputation may be severely damaged by non-attendance or laziness. The task of the talkoot may be something that is a common concern for the good of the group, or it may be to help someone with a task that exceeds their own capacity. For example, a talkoot might be organized to clear storm damage from an elderly resident’s garden, or siblings might arrange one to coordinate a parent’s milestone birthday celebration.

Typically, club houses, landings, churches, and parish halls can be repaired through a talkoot, or environmental tasks for the neighborhood are undertaken. The parents of pre-school children may gather to improve the playground, or the tenants of a tenement house may arrange a talkoot to put their garden in order for the summer or winter. A person unable to contribute with actual work may contribute food for the talkoot party, or act as a baby-sitter. When a talkoot is for the benefit of an individual, he or she is the host of the talkoot party and is obliged to offer food and drink.

==== Russia, Ukraine, Belarus, Poland ====
Toloka or taloka (also pomoch) in Russian (toloka in Ukrainian and talaka in Belarusian, tłoka in Polish) is the form of communal voluntary work. Neighbours gather together to build something, to harvest crops, etc.

==== Hungary ====
Kaláka (IPA: [ˈkɒlaːkɒ]) is the Hungarian word for working together for a common goal. This can be building a house or doing agricultural activities together, or any other communal work on a volunteer basis.

==== Ireland ====
Meitheal (IPA: [ˈmʲɛhəlˠ]) is the Irish word for a work team, gang, or party and denotes the co-operative labour system in Ireland where groups of neighbours help each other in turn with farming work such as harvesting crops.

The term is used in various writings of Irish language authors. It can convey the idea of community spirit in which neighbours respond to each other's needs. In modern use for example, a meitheal could be a party of neighbours and friends invited to help decorate a house in exchange for food and drink, or in scouting, where volunteer campsite wardens maintain campsites around Ireland.

==== Spain ====
In Asturias, the Andecha (from Latin indictia 'announcement) is voluntary, unpaid and punctual aid to help a neighbor carry out agricultural tasks (cutting hay, harvesting potatoes, building a barn, collecting apples to make cider, etc.). The work is rewarded with a snack or a small party and the tacit commitment that the person assisted will come with their family to the call of another andecha when another neighbor requests it. It is very similar to the Irish meitheal.

It should not be confused with another Asturian collective work institution, the sestaferia. In this, the provision of the service is mandatory (under penalty of fine) and is not called a to help of an individual but the provision of common services (repair of bridges, cleaning of roads, etc.)

==== Norway ====
Dugnad (IPA: [ˈdʉːgnɑd]) is a Norwegian term for voluntary work done together with other people. It is a core phenomenon for Norwegians, and the word was voted as the Norwegian word of the year 2004 in the TV programme Typisk norsk ('Typically Norwegian'). Participation in a dugnad is often followed by a common meal, served by the host, or consisting of various dishes brought by the participants, thus the meal is also a dugnad.

In urban areas, a dugnad often consists of outdoor spring cleaning and gardening in housing co-operatives. Dugnader (plural) are also a phenomenon in kindergartens and elementary schools to make the grounds nice, clean and safe and to do paintwork or other types of maintenance. Dugnader occur more widely in remote and rural areas. Neighbours sometimes participate during house or garage building, and organizations (such as kindergartens or non-profit organizations) may arrange annual dugnader.

The Norwegian word dugnadsånd means the spirit of being willing to work together for a better community. Many Norwegians will describe this as typical of Norway.

The word dugnad was used to unite the people of Norway to cooperate and shut down public activities to fight the pandemic of 2020.

In 2024, 61 % of the Norwegian population took part in some form of organized voluntary work, which is slightly lower than before the Covid pandemic.

==== Serbia ====
Moba (Serbian Cyrillic: моба) is an old Serbian tradition of communal self-help in villages. It was a request for help in labor-intensive activities, like harvesting wheat, building a church or repairing village roads.

The work was entirely voluntary and no compensation, except possibly meals for workers, was expected.

=== North America ===
==== Cherokee ====
Gadugi (Cherokee: ᎦᏚᎩ) is a term used in the Cherokee language which means 'working together' or 'cooperative labor' within a community. Historically, the word referred to a labor gang of men and/or women working together for projects such as harvesting crops or tending to gardens of elderly or infirm tribal members. The word Gadugi was derived from the Cherokee word for 'bread', which is Gadu.

In recent years the Cherokee Nation tribal government has promoted the concept of Gadugi. The GaDuGi Health Center is a tribally run clinic in Tahlequah, Oklahoma, the capital of the Cherokee Nation. The concept is becoming more widely known. In Lawrence, Kansas, in 2004 the rape crisis center affiliated with the University of Kansas, adopted the name the Gadugi Safe Center for its programs to aid all people affected by sexual violence.

=== Latin America ===
==== Dominican Republic ====
Convite.

==== Haiti ====
Konbit or Tet Ansanm in Haitian Creole.

==== Mexico ====
Tequio. Zapoteca

==== Quechua ====
Mink'a or minka (Quechua or Kichwa, Hispanicized minca, minga) is a type of traditional communal work in the Andes in favor of the whole community (ayllu). Participants are traditionally paid in kind. Mink'a is still practiced in indigenous communities in Peru, Colombia, Ecuador, Bolivia, and Chile, especially among the Quechua and the Aymara.

==== Pre-Incaic Andean ====
Before the Inca conquest of around 1450, the Aymara kingdoms practiced two forms of communal work – Ayni, which refers to work undertaken for one's own local community, or Ayllu with many tasks subdivided according to gender roles (Chachawarmi), and Minka, which refers to communal work taking place across different Ayllus such as building work or work undertaken during seasonal migrations such as the Aymaras from the Altiplano i.e. areas of the Andes mountains at too high an altitude for agriculture, migrating with their camelids to agricultural areas in the Precordillera, and then to the forests that were once present in today's Atacama Desert and finally helping build boats with the Chango peoples in the sea area near present-day Arica or Tacna, in return for fish which has been found in the stomachs of mummies found at said high altitudes such as around lake Titicaca The Inca added the practice of Mita (forced labour for the empire, e.g. silver mining) and the Yanakuna who are skilled individuals forcibly removed from their Ayllus to perform a task for the empire, for example as architects/builders. The concept of Minga in particular has been shown to encompass various forms of Andean communal work used from the Mapuche peoples in the south to the Moche and other Pre-Chavin peoples near Cuzco in what is now Peru.

==== Brazil ====
Mutirão is, in Brazil, a collective mobilization to achieve an end, based on mutual help provided free of charge. It is an expression originally used for working in the countryside, or for the construction of low-income houses. In a mutirão, everyone is simultaneously benevolent and beneficiary and works in a rotating system and without hierarchy. Currently, by extension of meaning, mutirão can designate any collective initiative for the execution of an unpaid service, such as a joint effort to paint a neighborhood school, clean a park and others. The word mutirão comes from the Tupi term motyrõ, which means 'work in common'. The same Tupi term gave rise to several other spellings, all currently in disuse (motirão, muquirão, mutirom, mutirum, mutrião, muxiran, muxirão, muxirom, pixurum, ponxirão, punxirão, putirão, putirom, putirum, puxirum).

==== Chile ====
In rural southern Chile, labor reciprocity and communal work remained common through the twentieth century and into the twenty-first, particularly in rural communities on the Archipelago of Chiloé. Referred to as mingas, the practice can be traced to pre-contact Mapuche and Huilliche traditions of communal labor. In Chiloé, mingas took the form either of días cambiados (tit for tat exchanges of labor between neighbors) or large-scale work parties hosted by a particular family, accompanied by food and drink, and often lasting several days. Most agricultural work and community construction projects were done by way of mingas. The tiradura de casa ('house pull') involved moving a house from one location to another.

==== Panama ====
In rural Panama, especially in the Azuero peninsula region and its diaspora, it is common to hold a junta party as a communal labor event. Most commonly these events are used to harvest rice, clear brush with machetes, or to build houses. Workers generally work without compensation but are provided with meals and often alcoholic beverages such as fermented chicha fuerte and seco.

== Bee ==
=== History ===
This use of the word bee is common in literature describing colonial North America. One of the earliest documented occurrences is found in the Boston Gazette for 16 October 1769, where it is reported that "Last Thursday about twenty young Ladies met at the house of Mr. L. on purpose for a Spinning Match; (or what is called in the Country a Bee)." It was, and continues to be, commonly used in Australia also, most often as "working bee".

=== In literature ===
Uses in literature include:

- "There was a bee to-day for making a road up to the church." – Anne Langton
- "The cellar ... was dug by a bee in a single day." – S. G. Goodrich
- "I made a bee; that is, I collected as many of the most expert and able-bodied of the settlers to assist at the raising." – John Galt, Lawrie Todd (1830)
- "When one of the pioneers had chopped down timber and got it in shape, he would make a logging bee, get two or three gallons of New England Rum, and the next day the logs were in great heaps. ... after a while there was a carding and jutting mill started where people got their wool made into rolls, when the women spun and wove it. Sometimes the women would have spinning bees. They would put rolls among their neighbors and on a certain day they would all bring in their yarn and at night the boys would come with their fiddles for a dance. ... He never took a salary, had a farm of 80 acres [324,000 m^{2}] and the church helped him get his wood (cut and drawn by a bee), and also his hay." – James Slocum
- "'I am in a regular quandary', said the mistress of the house, when the meal was about half over. Mr. Van Brunt looked up for an instant, and asked, 'What about?' 'Why, how I am ever going to do to get those apples and sausage-meat done. If I go to doing 'em myself I shall about get through by spring.' 'Why don't you make a bee?' said Mr. Van Brunt." – Susan Warner, The Wide, Wide World (1850)
- "She is gone out with Cousin Deborah to an apple bee." – Charlotte Mary Yonge, The Trial; or More Links of the Daisy Chain (1864)

=== Etymology ===
The origin of the word bee in this sense is debated. Because it describes people working together in a social group, a common belief is that it derives from the insect of the same name and similar social behaviour. This derivation appears in, for example, the Oxford English Dictionary. Other dictionaries, however, regard this as a false etymology, and suggest that the word comes from dialectal been or bean (meaning 'help given by neighbours'), derived in turn from Middle English bene (meaning 'prayer', 'boon' and 'extra service by a tenant to his lord').

== See also ==
- Sharing
