= La Woz =

Cultural organization in Saint Lucia

La Woz (Antillean Creole for "The Rose") is one of the two historic cultural societies (sociétés) of the Antillean country of Saint Lucia. It is also the name of the society's festival, held every August. The other societé is La Magwit ("The Marguerite"), which holds its festival in October.
