= Teddyson John =

Saint Lucian musician

Teddyson John MBE
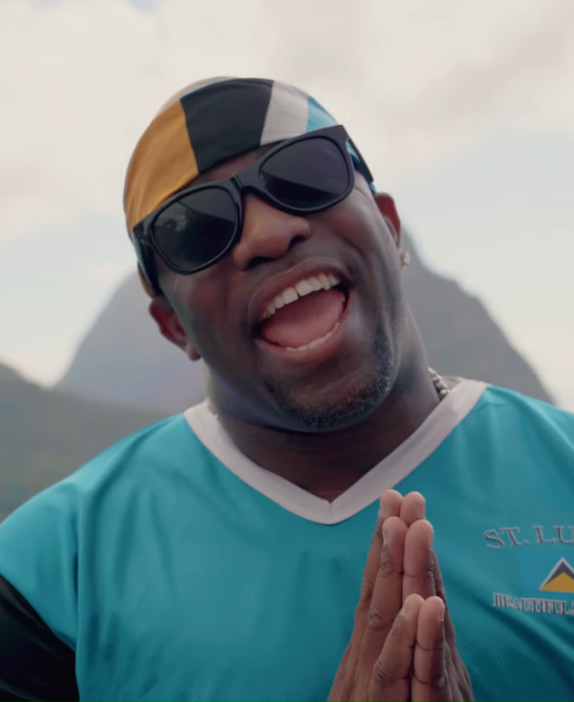
- John performing in 2020

Background information
- Also known as: Teddy; TJ
- Born: Castries, Saint Lucia
- Genres: Gospel, Jazz, R&B, Soca
- Occupations: Singer; songwriter
- Instruments: Keyboard, Percussion

Teddyson John, MBE, better known as Teddy or TJ, is a Saint Lucian brand ambassador, singer and songwriter. He is also a keyboardist and percussionist. John was Saint Lucia's first artist to win and be nominated for an International Reggae and World Music Award.

== Early life ==
John was born in a Christian family where his mom and dad were not musically inclined but some of his brothers were. However, John started singing and performing in church which would manifest in his days at the Sir Ira Simmons Secondary School. His first recording before he entered the Soca industry in 2007 was a gospel song entitled "Sweeter".

== Early career ==
Before John rose to fame he served in the hospitality industry. John worked at St Lucia Sandals Resort as an Entertainment Manager.

== Honors, Awards and nominations ==
In 2017 John became 1 of 12 Saint Lucians to be a part of Her Majesty's Birthday Honours. John received the honour of the Most Excellent Order of the British Empire M.B.E .

- United Kingdom - Most Excellent Order of the British Empire – M.B.E, of the British Empire (2017)

List of awards and nominations received by Teddyson John
Award	Year	Recipient	Category	Result	Ref.
International Soca Awards	2019	"Vent"	Groovy Soca of the Year – Male	Won	
Nigeria Entertainment Awards	2017	Himself	Best Afro Soca Artist	Nominated	
International World and Reggae Music Awards	2016	"Allez"	Best Soca /Calypso Artist	Won	

== Discography ==
Singles by Teddyson John
Title	Year
Lavi Dous	2022
Gyal Go	2022
Howdy	2022
Project 22	2022
Happy Life (feat. Full Brown)	2022
Together	2022

=== Albums ===
All tracks are written by Teddyson John.

Love.Passion.Music
No.	Title	Length
1.	"Land of Wine"	4:10
2.	"Wine Up On Me"	3:34
3.	"Out and Bad"	3:40
4.	"Take Over"	3:49
5.	"Sweet Soca Music"	3:55
6.	"Oh Gyal"	3:40
7.	"Spread Love"	3:24
Total length:		26:12
