= Madras (costume) =

Type of clothing

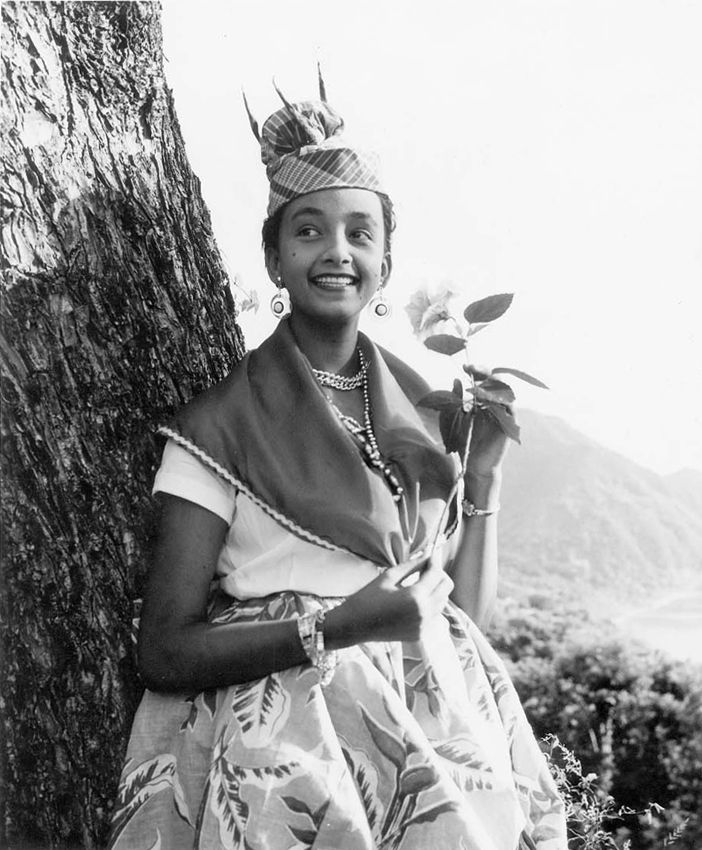
Edith Bellot, in the national dress of Dominica, 1961

The Wob Dwiyet, also called the Wob or Gwan Wob, is the national dress of the countries of Dominica, Saint Lucia, and French West Indies . A traditional four-piece costume. The Wob Dwiyet (or Wobe Dwiette), a grand robe worn by the earlier French settlers. The madras is the traditional pattern of the women and girls of Dominica and St. Lucia, and its name is derived from the madras cloth, a fabric used in the costume.

== History ==
The cloth, known as the madras, is named after its place of origin, Madras, India. The origins of the madras lie in the pre-emancipation days of St. Lucia, when enslaved Africans on the island would don the colourful dress during feast days. Beginning in the late 17th century, enslaved people on the island were forced to wear the livery of the estate to which they belonged. Normally a single colour, one piece item, originally worn as a sarong, later becoming a simple tunic with holes for the arms and head, and a simple rope belt. During Sundays and holidays, the enslaved people could normally wear what they wished, and through monies earned through selling produce from small plots of land, they would often buy colourful cloth. On feast days and special occasions, free women and enslaved people would wear the colourful clothes, now known as "Creole dress".

Towards the end of the 18th century the Indian cotton known as 'muchoir madras' became popular amongst the Creole women, and eventually replaced the white cotton head kerchief. The material was soon used for scarfs and then the 'jupe' or skirt. With the fashion for ribbons becoming popular, women added them to the lace on the arms and the neck of their chemise. The chemise, once fashionably long, became shorter until replaced by a blouse and petticoat, but still with the threaded ribbons.

The madras today is almost identical to the traditional costumes worn by other former French colonies of the Caribbean, including the neighbouring islands of Martinique, Guadeloupe and Dominica. In 2004 a national awareness campaign was launched by the Saint Lucian government during the 25th anniversary of the country's Independence. Both the Madras and the Wob Dwyiet, recognised as symbols of the country, were included in this campaign.

== Costume ==
The Madras is made up of five individual pieces of clothing. The costume comprises a white cotton or poplin blouse, known in French Creole as a chimiz decolté or chemise decoltee, finished with Broderie Anglaise and red ribbons. The second item is an ankle length skirt, again trimmed with lace and red ribbons; which has two gathers towards the lower end of the garment. The third item is the shorter outer skirt, made of Madras material, for which the costume is named. The Madras material is used again in the fourth item, the head piece, known as the Tête en l'air or tèt anlè; a square or rectangular piece of cloth worn over the forehead and folded to display varying numbers of peaks. The head scarf can be tied in a ceremonial fashion or can be worn to show the availability of the woman in courtship, depending on the number of peaks tied into it. One peak represents that the woman is single, two that she is married, three that she is widowed or divorced, and four that she is available to any who tries. The final item is a triangular silk scarf, foulard, pinned to the left shoulder, its apex at the end of the elbow and tucked into the waist of the skirt.

The costume is traditionally worn on Independence Day, National Day and Jounen Kwéyòl (Creole Day). It is also worn when dancing the Quadrille, which has been adopted by the country as the national dance.

== See also ==
- Quadrille dress
