= Societies of Saint Lucia =

Historic associations in Saint Lucia

The societies (societés) of Saint Lucia also known as "Societies of the Flowers" (Dirks, 1987, p7) are two historic associations on the Antillean island country of Saint Lucia, La Woz ("The Rose") and La Magwit ("The Marguerite"). Other islands that have historically had these societies as well were Dominica and Trinidad. Ostensibly based around singing the virtues of the rose and globosa flowers, the societies are intense rivals, and their membership includes most of the population of the island.

Each society holds a yearly festival, on August 30 for the "Roses" and October 17 for the "Marguerites". These flower festivals are unique to St. Lucia and are major events in the cultural life and history of the country.

The names La Woz and La Magawit are in the local Creole (Kweyol) language, that combines a European vocabulary with a West African-based grammar.

== History ==
The societies originated in the time of slavery as co-operative work groups created for mutual support, and assistance in time of trouble. These groups were similar to the dokpwé of Dahomey, and the coumbite of Haiti. They also had a great deal in common with the famed egbes of the Yoruba peoples, which were and still are presided over by the tribe's various chieftains through the framework of what is essentially a highly elaborate series of West African theatre states.

Notably, Dirks' (1987) mentioned that The Roses and The Marguerites were their island's beauties having commonalities with Jamaica's Set Girls: Red Set Girls, Blue Set Girls, and the French Sets- Royalists, Mabiales and Americans (p 7).

Furthermore, the two societies were vaguely inspired by two mystic orders that were active at the time in Europe, Rosicrucianism and Freemasonry. This connection is depicted in a mural painted by Dunstan St. Omer, which shows the holy trinity of Osiris, Horus and Isis.

In former years the St Lucian society was split in affiliation to one or the other group. At times membership has been illegal, and it has also been condemned by the Roman Catholic Church. Nevertheless, the societies survived, although their nature has changed through the centuries. As the general society changed, so did the sociétés, becoming more commercial and money-oriented. In time, other organisations were created for money saving and social security. Nowadays, the two historical societés are largely devoted to solidarity through recreation.

At the time of Saint Lucia's Independence, when the national symbols – tree, bird, flower etc. – were being defined, St Lucia chose to have two flowers, a rose and a marguerite.

== Structure ==
Both societies have a formal hierarchic structure patterned upon the socio-economic structure of colonial society. Each society has a king and a queen, as well as princes, princesses, and many other symbolic legal, military and professional roles, such as judges, policemen, nurses, soldiers, doctors.

== Festivals in Saint Lucia ==
Preparations for the yearly festivals begin several months before the actual feast day. Each group holds "seances". These consist of all night singing and dancing sessions where drinks are sold and games are played.

The central figure at the "seances" is the chantwèl or leadsinger who sustains the spirit and tenor of the entertainment. Most groups have one outstanding chantwèl. They are usually female.

On the actual day of the festival all members of the society dress in the finery of their respective roles and march to Church for a service which precedes their parade through the streets before returning to the hall for their feasting or grande fete.
