= Tequio =

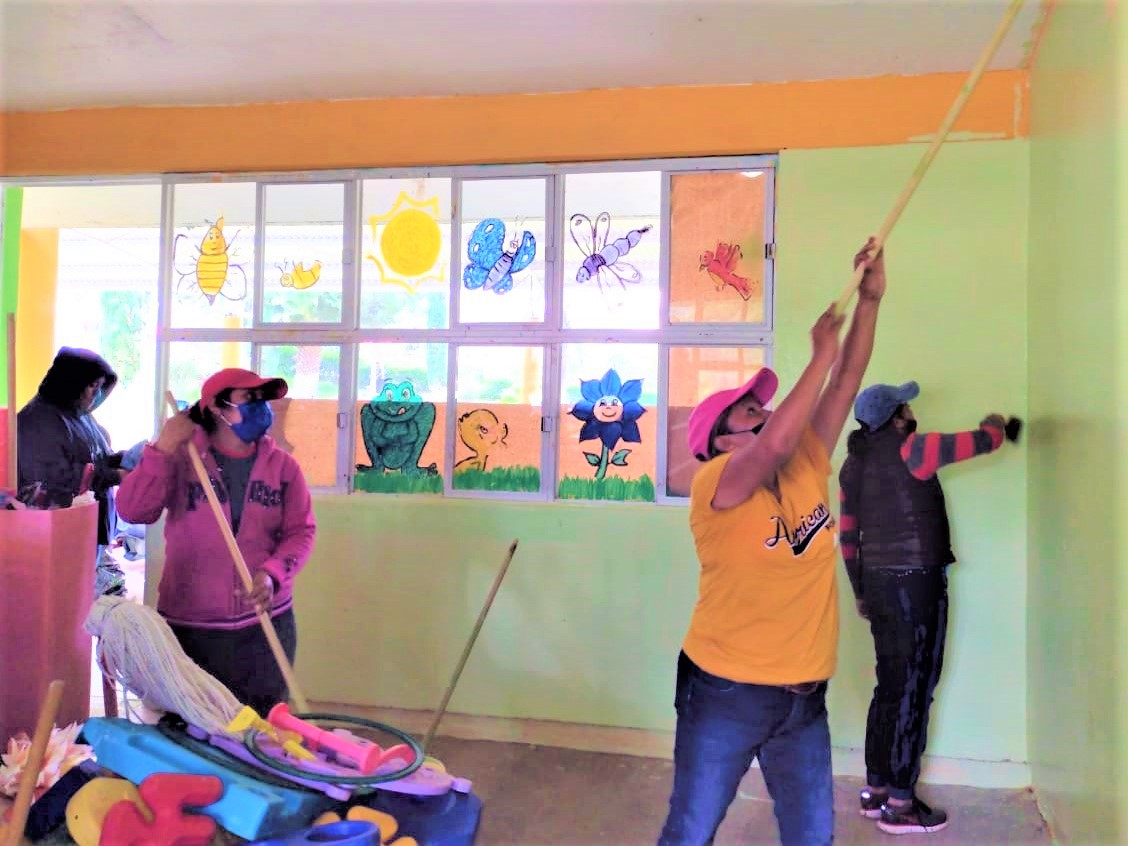
Women performing tequio in the form of painting a kindergarten. San Juan Achiutla, Oaxaca, Mexico, 2021.

In Mexico, the task or collective work that each person owes to their indigenous community is known as tequio. Since it is done for the benefit of the community itself, it is not paid work. Tequio is a custom which various indigenous communities throughout Mexico continue to practice to varying degrees and in different ways. Similar concepts to tequio are minka in several South America countries and hacendera in Spain.

== Etymology and Synonyms ==
In his work "Aquí comienca (sic) un vocabulario en lengua castellana y mexicana" (Vocabulary in Castilian and Mexican language) Friar Alonso de Molina translated the Nahuatl words tequitl as tribute and tequitiliztli as work. He documented two variants of tequio, which does not require phonetic adaptation to Castilian: tequiutl which has been adapted as tequiuh by losing its final consonantal tl. It is defined as a work or tribute. Father Ángel María Garibay in his Llave del Náhuatl tells us that the verb tequi or tequiotl means "work" or "feeling tired". "Dictionary of nahuatl in the Spanish of Mexico" defines the word tequitl as "work" or "tribute", the same definition is given in Diccionario de la Lengua Española online.

This form of contribution or contribution of work for the community also receives the names of tequil, mano vuelta (hand turned), fajina, task, corima (from the Rarámuri language, to give away or share) or trabajo de en medio (work in the middle). Due to the fact that the Nahuatl language was used as the lingua franca during the colonial era in New Spain, tequio is the term that has been generalized in various areas to refer to this activity.

The expression in Spanish prestar el servicio (to provide the service) means "providing tequio". Providing the service is honorable for members of the indigenous community and is understood as a moral obligation that they cannot refuse. It is one an occasion to meet, partake in collective work, and identify as a community. Members of communities that practice tequio will periodically take a day off of work to provide service in a task required by the community. Tasks accomplished during tequio usually fall under a category of honorable and prestigious work that, according to the ancient purely indigenous custom, should not be charged for or compensated. The indigenous person is called to carry the topilli, the baton of command, to preserve and resolve common affairs according to custom, she is appointed by her community to direct it and represent it as an indigenous council supported by the topiles, even at the cost of the personal sacrifice that it meant in all of them and still means in various indigenous communities, especially in some of the Oaxacan ones where they survive.

In some communities, members who have since moved elsewhere in Mexico or the United States of America are appointed in absentia to provide community service. No matter where they now reside, they will receive notice of their appointment asking them to return to perform community services. The custom is so respected that people will leave jobs and places of residence to return to the community to provide the service.

== Custom and social organization ==
In the Mexica society tequio was part of the society and economy, frequently used to accomplish community projects that were useful to the neighborhood or city such as canals, canales, roads, and temple reparations. After the conquest of Mexico, these community works continued under the name cuadrilleros and were considered as part of the obligatory tribute that the indigenous people had to pay to the king, nobles, officials, lords or encomenderos. Around 1605 Viceroy Juan de Mendoza y Luna issued the Ordenanzas sobre el tequio y la tarea que han de tener los indios (Ordinances on tequio and the task that the [sic] indians must have) as a supposedly better substitute to the harsh repartimiento labor system.

In the Triqui community, although tequio is obligatory and unpaid, participating in these collective works gives one prestige in the eyes of the community. History of performing tequio is an element that is considered for those who aspire to have a position as an authority in it. The Mixe communities have created infrastructure for the supply of drinking water, electricity, roads, and other needs through tequio.

The required number of days that men must contribute to collective municipal works through tequio varies greatly from one municipality to another. The state government of Oaxaca sends more resources to the municipalities to try to carry out the works without resorting to the free work that tequio represents, however the communities defend this tradition because they consider not only the material results of these works to be important, but also their social value in strengthening the coexistence and integration of the members of the communities. Tequio is also used as a form of annual cooperation to carry out the festivities of the patron saint of the communities.

Due to the fact that some members of indigenous communities have abandoned the Catholic religion in favor of other Christian religions, these members refuse to cooperate in tequio, giving rise to tension and confrontations.

For example, in Santa María Yosocuno, Teposcolula, five families from the religious organization Jehovah's Witness were forced to abandon their homes and their lands for refusing to comply with the community tequio and sing the National Anthem during the patriotic celebrations from September 15-16, 2005. The provisions stated that their return would not be accepted as long as they did not renounce their religious beliefs. Since the 19th century Mexican law guarantees and protects every person's right to freedom of ethical convictions, conscience, and religion. However communities and individuals must consider that tequio, work for the indigenous community for their own well-being, does not have any content that harms, questions or confronts the faith of any person because it is not an ideology or a religious manifestation or anti-religious. As organized work, the custom of tequio faces various dilemmas, both for the communities that persevere in their uses and customs, and for those who freely adopt other ethical, cultural, or religious traditions.[no reference]

== Works Accomplished Through Tequio ==
Thanks to tequio, roads, streets, schools, squares, markets, drinking water and drainage networks, clinics, spaces, and sports and cultural facilities have all been built and rebuilt or maintained; municipal and communal offices, and in the past, when they were used or needed, telephone and post offices; pipes and irrigation canals, pantheons and many other public works or services are built and maintained. Tequio can be fulfilled even through dancing in festivities, as in Tehuantepec; or in restoration work of cultural heritage, as in the case of the organ of the former convent of Tlacochahuaya, in the Central Valleys of Oaxaca in 2001; or operating indigenous community radios, which, at least until 2011, operated through tequio, which accentuates its character and social purpose. Tequio is a practice of union and cooperation that should not be lost.

In the municipalities of Oaxaca, the Communal Assets Commissariat organizes tequio of the same name, communal assets tequio works in which, for example, lanes are cleaned along the borders of neighboring municipalities to keep clear their boundaries, avoid conflicts, and maintain good and friendly coexistence. It also organizes reforestation.

Tequio organized by the municipality organizes it is usually cleaning and maintenance of streets, squares, markets, irrigation pipes, drainage, schools or patching and laying gravel on unpaved neighborhood roads to keep them passable, or removal of materials such as stones, and trees dragged by stormwater avenues that have invaded public roads or properties.

Tequio can also be community-organized in response to natural disasters. Some examples include the earthquakes in Asunción Ixtaltepec, Unión Hidalgo, and Juchitán de Zaragoza, where, summoned by Francisco Toledo, the community created around 100 tequio-based kitchens to feed those affected by the earthquake of 2017. In San Marcial Ozoltepec when Hurricane Pauline completely destroyed a local road (which had originally been built through tequio) in 1997 the community came together to rebuild despite the difficult conditions.

In Yalalag, Sierra Norte de Oaxaca (and other municipalities in that region), as of the year 2000 the work of assistant to the municipality or "topil", that of alderman, trustee or municipal president was considered community service, unpaid volunteer work, or tequio. Although this represented economic difficulties for those who took the position, they knowingly assumed it to act and comply according to custom, considering it an act of dignity to accept and serve, receiving in return the respect of the community. Paying a salary to perform these positions is culturally considered a form of corruption. Thus, conflict arose among members of that community who were in favor of exercising the budget items destined to pay the salaries of the members of the city council.

The conservation of cooperative systems such as tequio and governments with traditional authorities that do not tax the community in order to offer resources contributes to the existence of a healthy social fabric in indigenous communities even as communal ties are weakening in the rest of the country.

== Tequio organizing principals ==
Some examples of tequio rules in various Oaxacan indigenous municipalities (several from San Juan Achiutla are taken for this sample) are that anyone over 18 years of age is obliged to make tequio, both men and women, although the latter are assigned lighter jobs. The frequency varies from one locality to another. After the age of 64, the obligation to lend tequio ends. When a past community member returns to live in the municipality definitively, their return is notified and, if they are not more than 64 years old, they restart with the fulfillment of tequio like any other inhabitant. When some members of the community do not participate in a tequio, either due to personal commitments or illness, they must replace it in a "failure tequio" that is organized so that those who fail for some reason attend, or pay the equivalent of a daily wage to the worker who replace them in said tequio. This measure is put in place so that members always comply and are up to date with their tequio.

== Abuses of tequio ==
Although tequio is an important and valued tradition and component of indigenous culture designed to benefit the entire community, dishonest or arbitrary authorities can misuse tequio to take advantage of citizens and violate their constitutional rights.

For example, there have been cases in which a citizen of a municipality where tequio is preserved, who had emigrated to another part of Mexico or outside the country to have a better job or way of life, are either denied care by the municipality or pressured to return years or decades of owed tequio upon returning. In other cases, when they return, they are asked to make a "donation" for the unrealized tequios, which slows down the progress of their personal and family financial development to which they are also entitled.

=== The Eufrosina Cruz Case ===
On November 4, 2007 Eufrosina Cruz won the elections for municipal president of her indigenous community Santa María Quiegolani, Oaxaca by internal normative systems (this is what the Mexican Constitution calls the "uses and customs", one of them the tequio). However the victory was not recognized due to her being a woman and "for not having participated in the tequio", violating her human and constitutional rights. Cruz was unfortunately never allowed to take up the position that she legitimately won.

=== The Women of San Juan Achiutla Case ===
A similar case occurred to a group of women of San Juan Achiutla, Oaxaca, who were prevented from voting in the ordinary election of councilors to join the town council on October 9, 2016, because, among other arguments, inadmissible and illegal against them, "they were not in the municipal census due to not performing tequio in the community."

Fortunately, this type of abuse and arbitrariness is not frequent, and, as in the case of the women of San Juan Achiutla, the indigenous citizens exercised legal resources to combat them and to put a stop to the abuses and injustices with tequio. Tequio is sacred and must not be used for political or other purposes that are not for the common benefit.

The internal normative systems, or uses and customs, of the indigenous communities are not and cannot be above the Constitution or the law. The indigenous communities are not a separate republic, but rather a component part of the multiculturalism of the Mexican Nation, unique and indivisible. Article 2 of the Political Constitution of the United Mexican States says: "The Nation has a multicultural composition originally based on its indigenous peoples, which are those that descend from populations that inhabited the current territory of the country when colonization began," and more hereinafter, "The right of indigenous peoples to self-determination shall be exercised within a constitutional framework of autonomy that ensures national unity" also recognizing their autonomy to "Apply their own normative systems in the regulation and resolution of their internal conflicts, subject to the general principles of this Constitution, respecting individual guarantees, human rights and, in a relevant way, the dignity of women".

== Legislation ==
Tequio must be classified as a job or service that is part of the normal civic obligations (article 6.3.d of the American Convention on Human Rights, in force in Mexico since 1981) of the members of the communities. Therefore, its remuneration or gratuity does not violate article 5 of the Mexican Constitution, which determines that no one can be deprived of the product of their work. Although tequio is unpaid communal work, it is for the benefit of the community that performs it, thus it cannot be classified as forced labour.

Today, the Political Constitution of the Free and Sovereign State of Oaxaca, in the fourth paragraph of its article 12, establishes the preservation of tequio as an indigenous use. It reads as follows: "The authorities of the municipalities and communities will preserve tequio as an expression of solidarity according to the uses of each indigenous people and community. The tequios aimed at carrying out works of common benefit, derived from the agreements of the assemblies, of the municipal and community authorities of each indigenous people and community, may be considered by law as payment of municipal contributions; the law will determine the authorities and procedures tending to resolve the controversies that arise due to the provision of tequio." Provision that appears practically with the same legal text in article 43 of the Law on the Rights of Indigenous Peoples and Communities of the State of Oaxaca.

Likewise, in accordance with section III of article 28 of the Municipal Organic Law of the State of Oaxaca, it is the obligation of the citizens of the municipality to "Collaborate when appropriate with their tequio in collective work for the benefit of the community to which they belong." With this, as it is codified in the Constitution and in the Oaxacan laws, and as it is fulfilled in the facts by the indigenous communities; the use, the custom, the indigenous customary law of tequio, has become positive law in the State of Oaxaca, pending its regulation by means of a general rule.

One of the main provisions that the tequio regulatory law must contain, or be added to the Municipal Organic Law referred to above, and in the meantime be assumed and observed by the communities, is that no one can be deprived of their political rights (to vote and be elected) or of another nature, as a sanction for what is considered non-compliance with the provision of tequio, which must be treated in accordance with local uses and customs without affecting and respecting the enjoyment of constitutional rights and guarantees. Well, no one can be deprived of their rights without a trial followed before courts that comply with the formalities of the procedure and in accordance with the law, specifies article 14 of the Mexican Constitution, which also in subsection III section A of its 2nd article recognizes indigenous peoples' right to self-determination: “guaranteeing that indigenous women and men shall enjoy and exercise their right to vote and be voted for in conditions of equality; as well as access and hold public and popularly elected positions for which they have been elected or appointed [...] In no case may community practices [such as tequio] limit the political-electoral rights of citizens in the election of their municipal authorities." However, in practice, as shown above, in some communities people have been prevented from exercising or enjoying their rights in violation of the Constitution and the law, so it is considered convenient to reiterate it. What abounds does not harm, says the general principle of law.

== Gallery ==
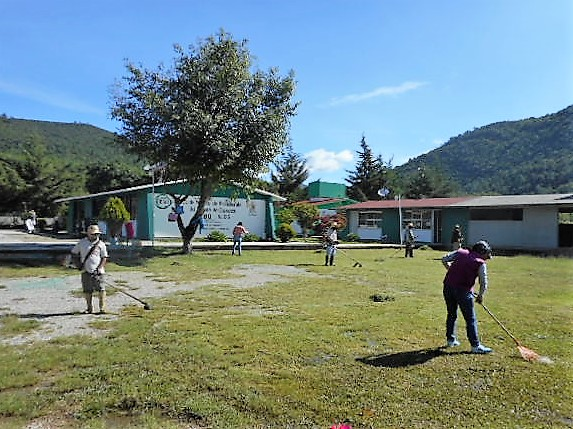
Tequio en el plantel 126 “Achiutla” del Instituto de Estudios de Bachillerato del Estado de Oaxaca (IEBO) realizado por las comunidades de San Juan Achiutla y San Miguel Achiutla, Oaxaca, México, 2018.

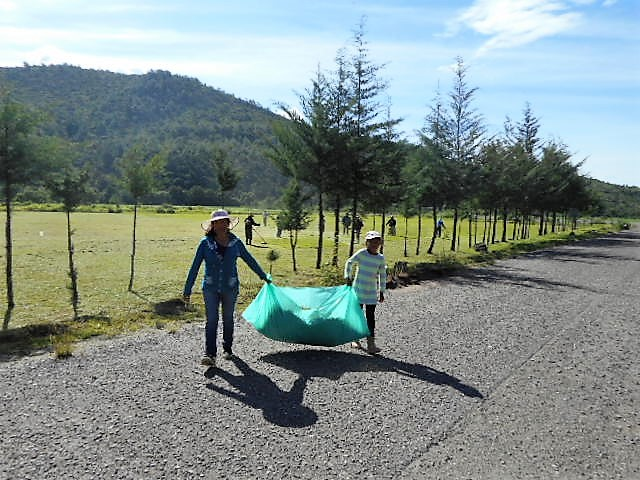
Mujeres, jóvenes y hombres de San Juan Achiutla, San Miguel Achiutla y Sanitago Atoyaquillo participando en el tequio en el IEBO, Oaxaca, México, 2018.

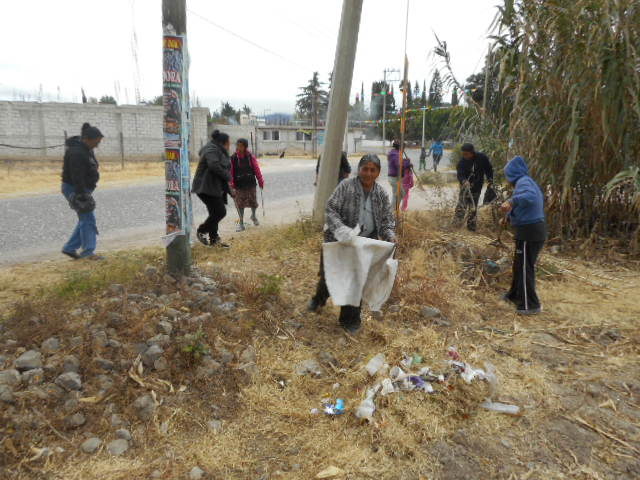
Mujeres haciendo el tequio limpiando calles. Tejupan, Oaxaca, México, 2018.

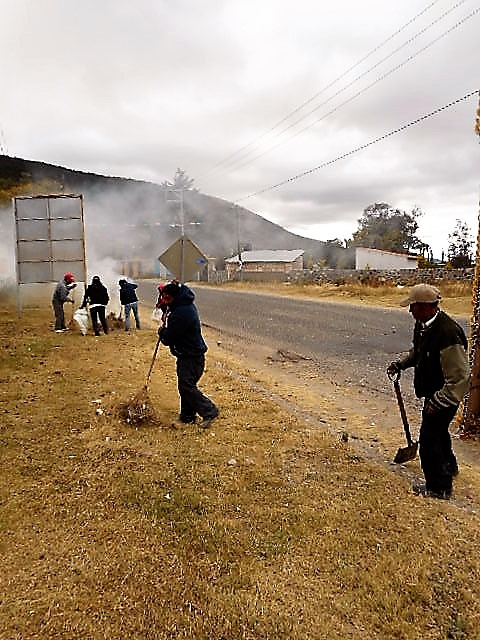
Barrido y quema de basura mediante tequio. Tejupan, Oaxaca, México, 2018.

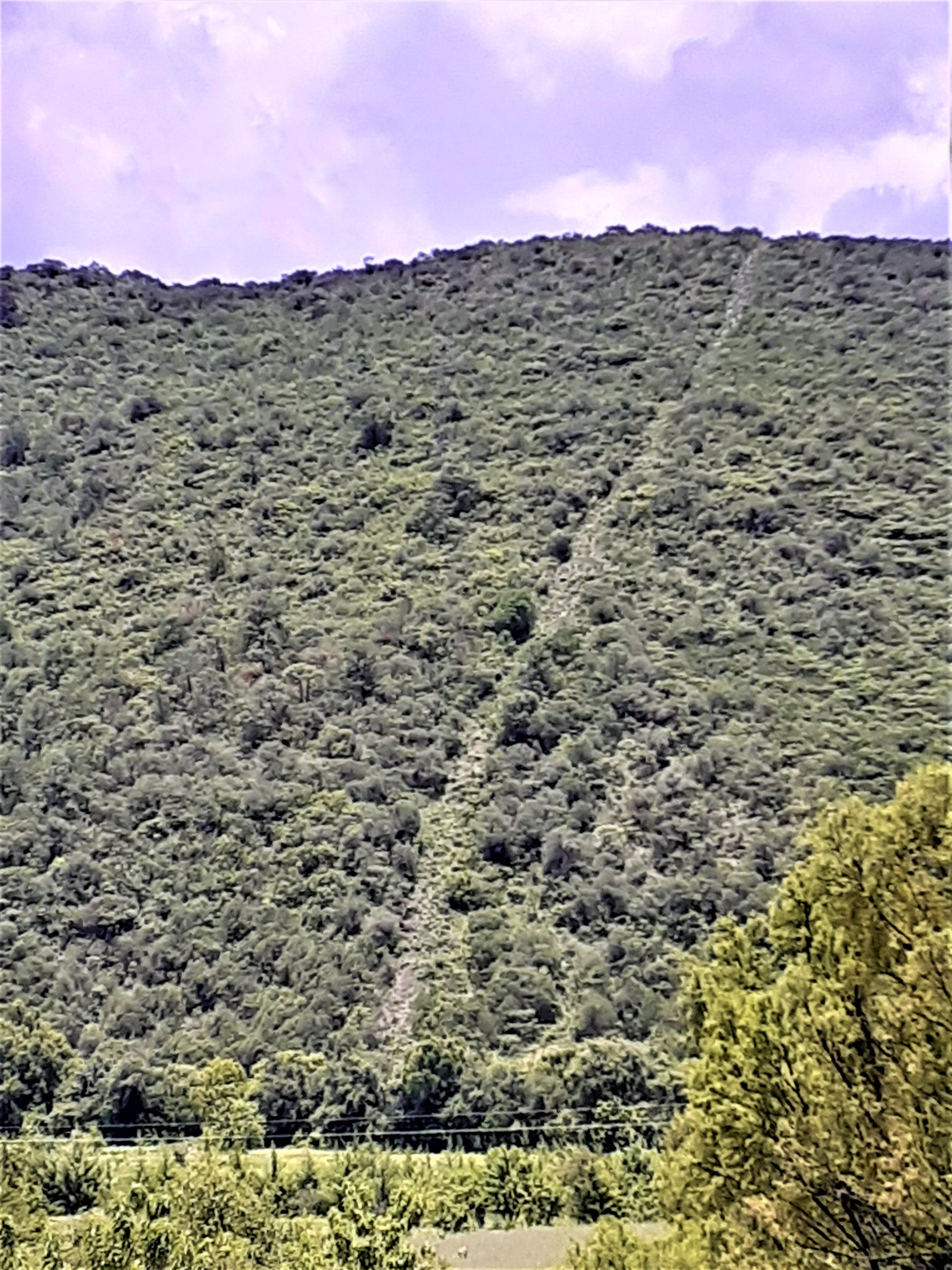
Carril o brecha desmontada sobre el cerro hecha con tequio por las comunidades de San Juan Achiutla y San Miguel Achiutla para señalar los límites de ambos municipios. Oaxaca, México, 2020.

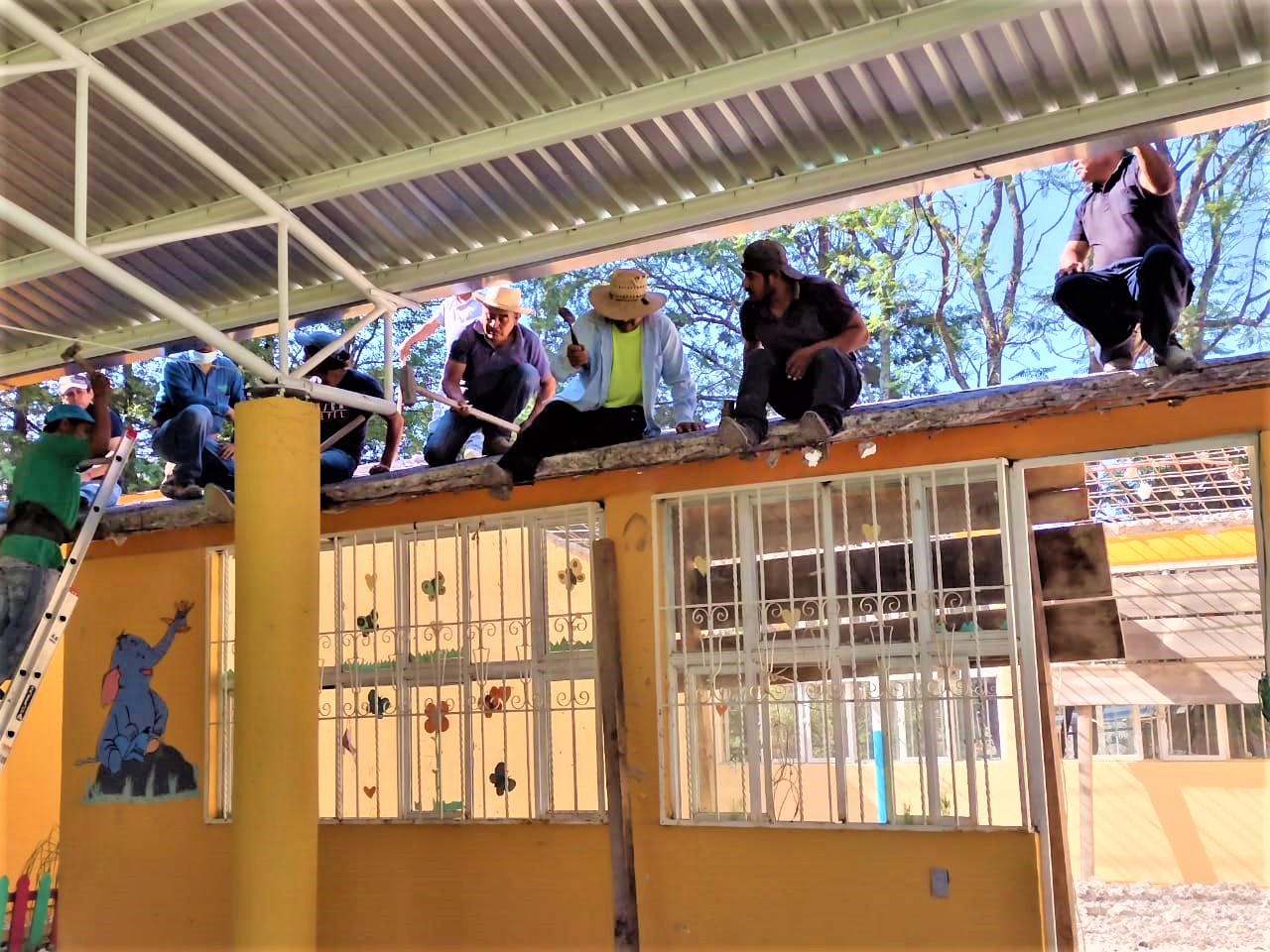
Tequio de reconstrucción de un aula del jardín de niños de San Juan Achiutla dañado por el terremoto de 2017, Oaxaca, México, 2021.

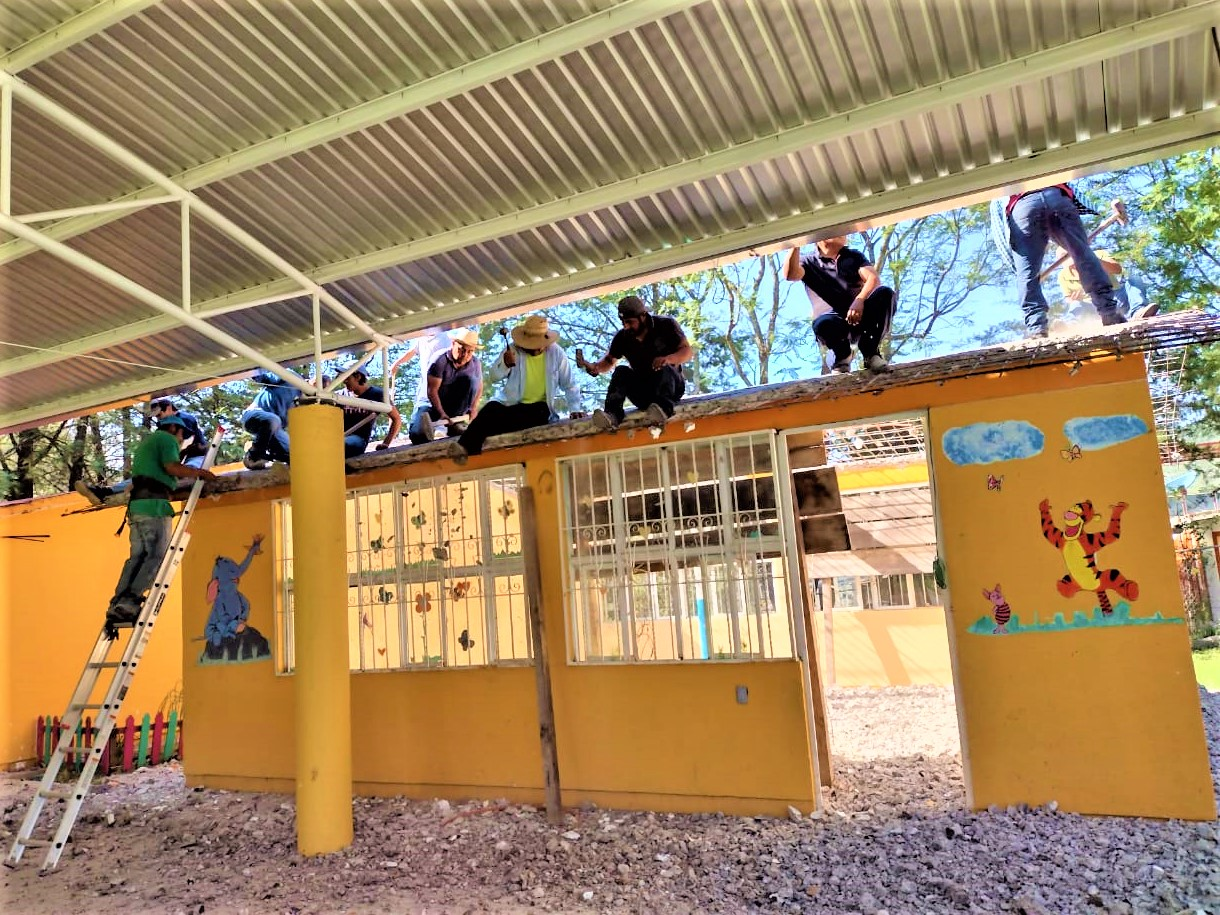
Tequio de reconstrucción de un aula del jardín de niños de San Juan Achiutla dañado por el sismo de 2017, Oaxaca, México, 2021.

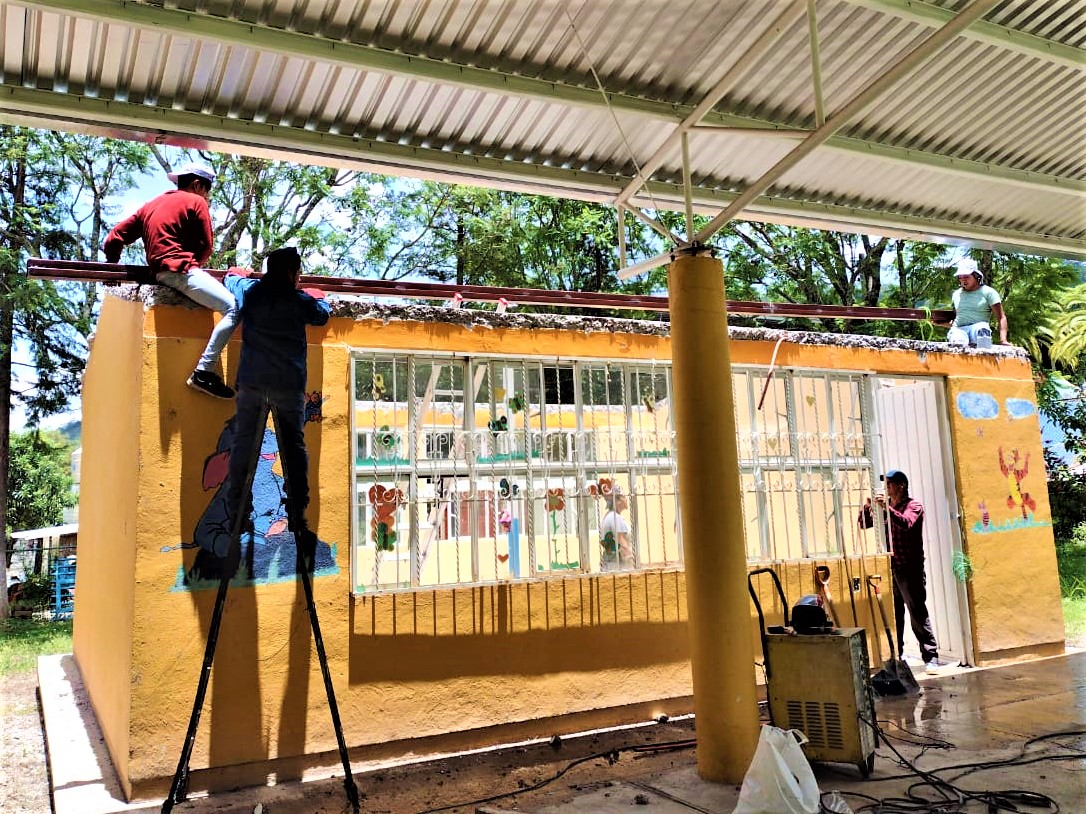
Tequio de reconstrucción de un aula del jardín de niños de San Juan Achiutla dañado por el sismo de 2017, Oaxaca, México, 2021.

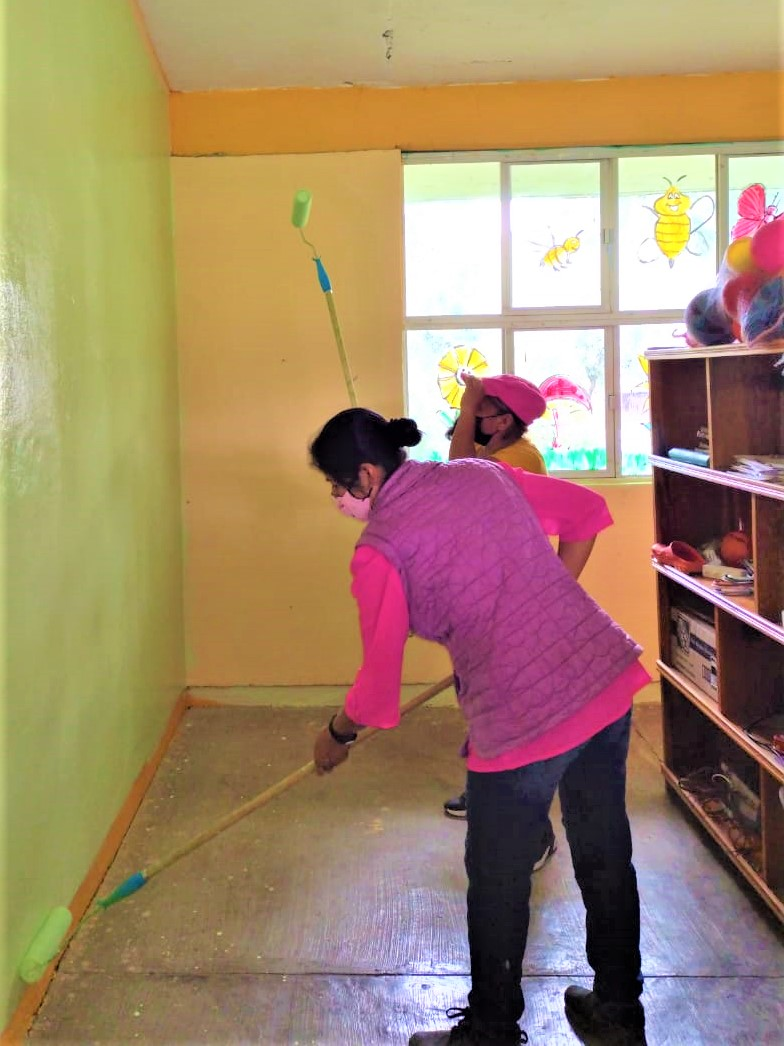
Madres de familia haciendo tequio pintando el jardín de niños. San Juan Achiutla, Oaxaca, México, 2021.

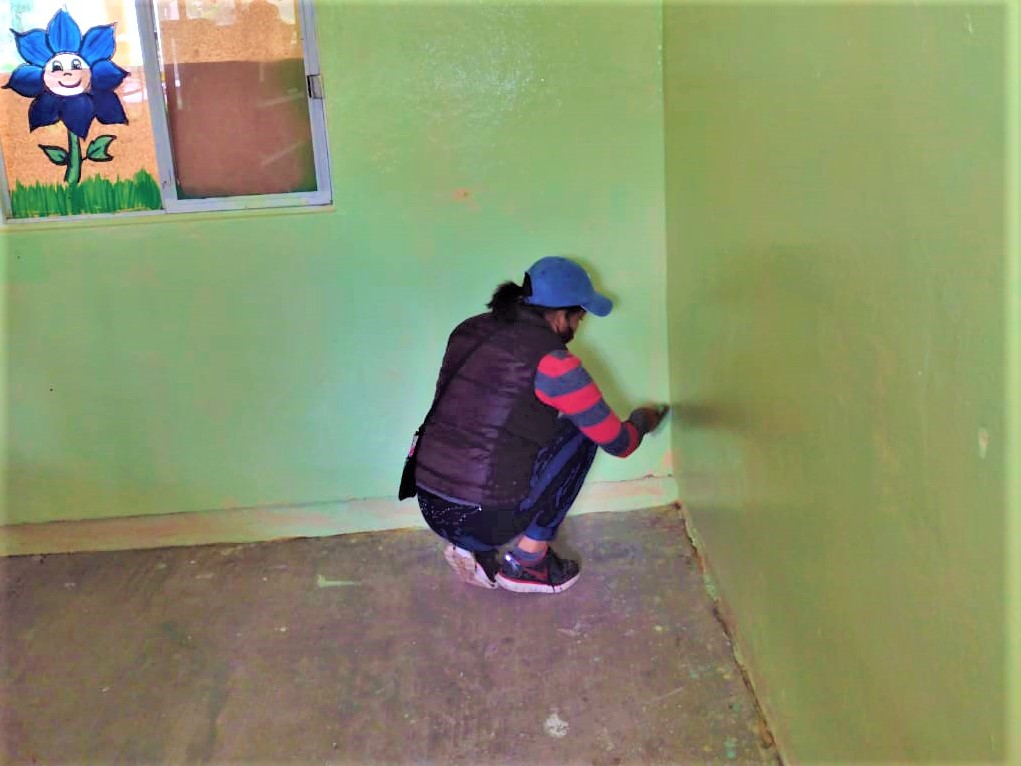
Madre de familia haciendo tequio pintando el jardín de niños. San Juan Achiutla, Oaxaca, México, 2021.

== See also ==
- Minka
- Hacendera
- Obreriza
- Andecha
- Sextaferia

== Bibliography ==
- Hernández, Esther (1996). Vocabulario en lengua castellana y mexicana de fray Alonso de Molina. España: Consejo Superior de Investigaciones Científicas. ISBN 84-00-07599-4.
- Kraemer Bayer, Gabriela (2003). Autonomía indígena región mixe: relaciones de poder y cultura política. Mexico: Editorial Plaza y Valdés. ISBN 970-722-198-4.
- Rojas Rabiela, Teresa; López Austin, Alfredo (1986). "El sistema de organización en cuadrillas". In Andrés Molina y Alfredo López Austin (ed.). Origen y formación del estado en Mesoamérica. Mexico: Universidad Nacional Autónoma de México. pp. 135–150. ISBN 968-837-959-X.
- Zolla, Carlos; Zolla Márquez, Emiliano (2004). Los pueblos indígenas de México. 100 preguntas. Mexico: Universidad Nacional Autónoma de México. ISBN 970-32-1674-9.
