= La Magwit =

Cultural association and festival in Saint Lucia

La Magwit (Antillean Creole for "The Marguerite") is one of the two historic cultural associations (societés) of Saint Lucia, and also the name of the society's yearly festival held every October 17.

The "marguerite" referred to by the name is not a daisy but a small magenta coloured globe flower Gomphrena globosa, rather like a clover.
