= Jounen Kwéyòl =

Cultural celebration held in St. Lucia and Dominica

- Observed by: Countries: Saint Lucia; Dominica
- Type: Cultural
- Begins: Last Friday of October
- Ends: Last Sunday of October
- Frequency: Annual
- First time: 1984; 41 years ago

Jounen Kwéyòl (Creole Day) is celebrated in the Caribbean islands of Dominica and Saint Lucia, on the last Friday of October and the last Sunday of October respectively and has been held annually since 1984. Throughout the preceding week, the various towns on both islands host cultural events and festivals which showcase different elements of their heritage and culture.

== Cultural Dishes ==
There are multiple displays of local dishes and foods such as roasted breadfruit, Coupe (a sweetbread made by mixing spices and sugar into flour and kneading it then baking it, usually served at breakfast), callaloo soup, green fig and salt fish (The National Dish of Saint Lucia), and grated vegetables such as carrots and cabbage. A dish known as Bouillon (lentils/red beans and pumpkin soup with pork or beef, green plantains, dumplings, spinach, and chopped carrots along with other ground provisions) is usually prepared. Local drinks are available, such as Cocoa Tea, Sorrel juice, different types of alcoholic punch (breadfruit, sea-moss and peanut, to name a few), Spice (an alcoholic drink made by mixing local spices and various barks from medicinal plants with rum), Golden Apple Juice, Guava juice, Orange juice and many more local fruit juices. Apart from the variety of cultural foods, the day is commemorated with traditional folk music or 'kweyol' music, some of which have been passed down from prior generations.

== Musical Instruments ==
The most widely used instruments during Creole Day performances, besides vocals, are the "Shak-Shak" (similar to the maracas), the Boom-Boom (a large, wooden, windpipe instrument), Accordion, tambourine, and Tambos (a goat-skin drum, beaten during traditional dances or recitations of Creole-language songs or limericks). Jounen Kwéyòl is usually observed by wearing the island's national wear, which is composed of the Wob Dwiete and jip ensemble for the women and a Madras (a special type of plaid material) jacket, white shirt, black slacks, and red sash for the men. Today, however, people frequently use Madras to create less formal versions of traditional clothing. This event is also celebrated at schools, where students are allowed to dress in their Madras outfits and take part in the aforementioned activities. This has become a custom in the islands of Dominica and Saint Lucia.
