= Barn raising =

Collective construction by community

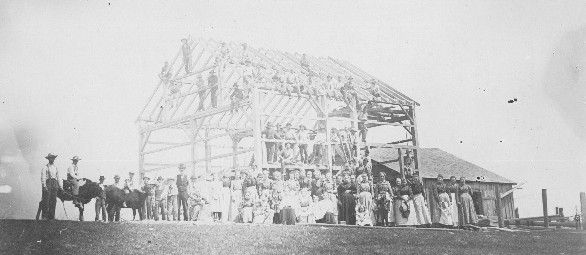
A barn raising, DeKalb County, Indiana, USA, about 1900

A barn raising, raising bee, or rearing is an action in which a barn for a resident of a community is built or rebuilt collectively by its members. Barn raising was particularly common in 18th- and 19th-century rural North America. A barn was a necessary structure for any farmer, for example for storage of cereals and hay and keeping of animals. Yet a barn was also a large and costly structure, the assembly of which required more labor than a typical family could provide. Barn raising addressed the need by enlisting members of the community, unpaid, to assist in the building of their neighbors' barns. Because each member could ask others for help, reciprocation could eventually reasonably be presumed for each participant if the need were to arise.

The tradition of "barn raising" continues, more or less unchanged, in some Amish and Old Order Mennonite communities, particularly in Ohio, Indiana, Pennsylvania, and some rural parts of Canada. The practice continues outside of these religious communities, albeit less frequently than in the 19th century. Most frames today are raised using a crane and small crew.

== Description ==
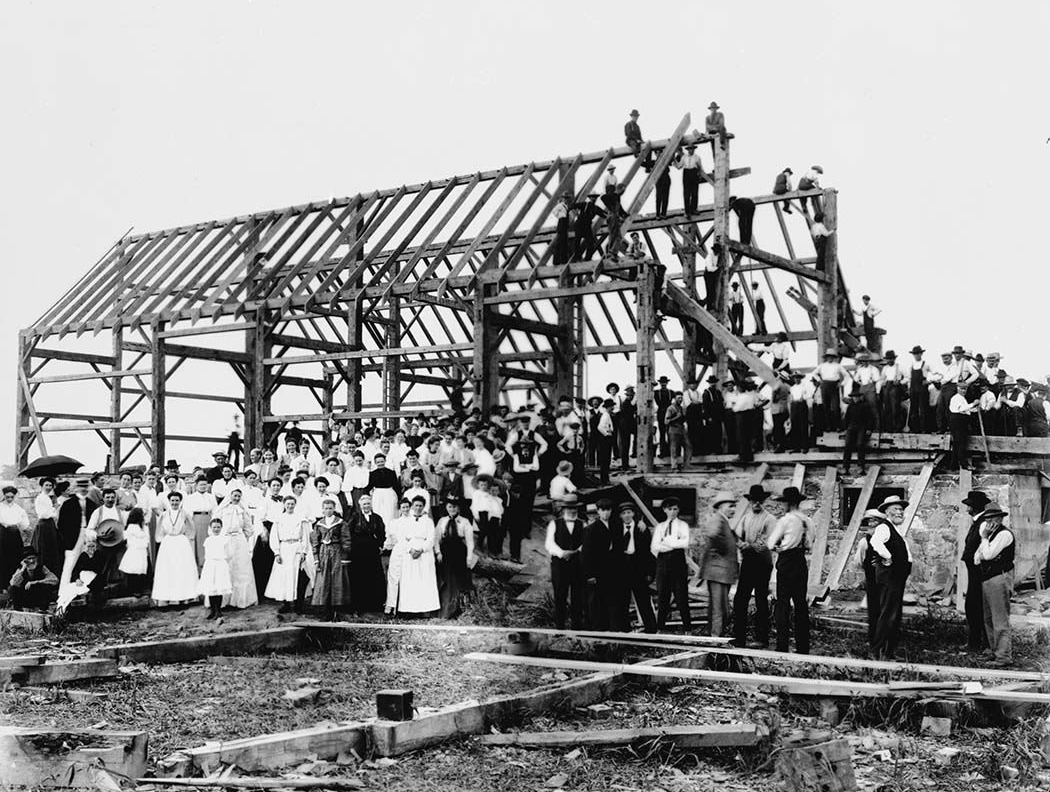
A barn raising north of Toronto, Ontario, Canada in the 20th century

A large amount of preparation is done before the one to two days a barn raising requires. Lumber and hardware are laid in, plans are made, ground is cleared, and tradesmen are hired. Materials are purchased or traded for by the family who will own the barn once it is complete.

Generally, participation is mandatory for community members. These participants are not paid. All able-bodied members of the community are expected to attend. Failure to attend a barn raising without the best of reasons leads to censure within the community. Some specialists brought in from other communities for direction or joinery may be paid, however.

One or more people with prior experience or with specific skills are chosen to lead the project. Older people who have participated in many barn raisings are crew chiefs. On the whole, the affair is well organized. At most barn raisings, the community members have raised barns before and approach the task with experience both in the individual tasks and the necessary organization. Young people participating physically for the first time have watched many barn raisings and know what is expected of them.

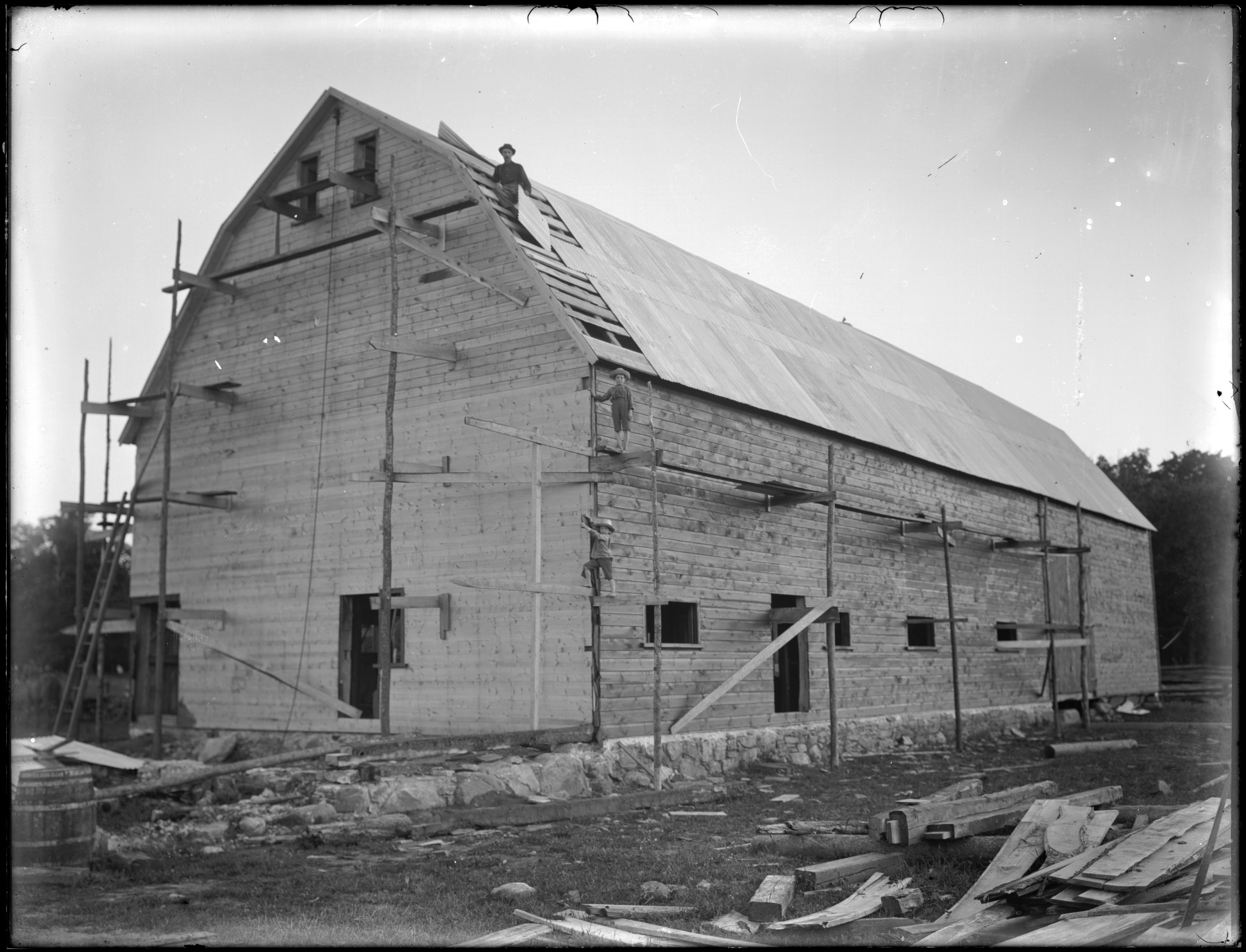
Raising a barn in Eastern Ontario in the early 20th century

Only certain specialists are permitted to work on the more critical jobs, such as the joinery and doweling of the beams. (Post and beam construction is the traditional method of construction in barn raisings.) There is competition for these jobs, and they are sought after. Workers are differentiated by age and gender: men construct the barn, women provide water and food, the youngest children watch, and older boys are assigned to fetch parts and tools.

Most barn raisings were accomplished in June and July when the mostly agrarian society members had time between planting season and harvest season. Timber for the framing was mostly produced in the winter by the farmer and his crew hewing logs to the correct shape with axes or felling the trees and bringing them to a sawmill.

An ancient tradition is to place a bough, wreath and/or flag at the high point of the frame after the last piece is in place. This celebration is called topping out and historically the master carpenter may also make a speech and a toast.

== Social framework ==
In earlier American rural life, communities raised barns because many hands were required. In areas that were sparsely settled or on the edge of the frontier, it was not possible to hire carpenters or other tradesmen to build a barn. The harsher winters gave more urgency to the matter of barn construction than was present in the relatively milder climate in much of Europe. Similar conditions have given rise to similar institutions, such as the Finnish one of 'talkoot'. As is clear from the account, for example, in Stevenson Whitcomb Fletcher's Pennsylvania Agriculture and Country Life 1640-1840, (Harrisburg, Pennsylvania Historical Commission, p. 440 ff.), barn-raisings were typically occasions of community good-feeling, solidarity and festivity, as well as cooperative labor, and figured as part of a wider culture of neighborly mutual assistance (at harvest, for instance), sharing of tools and ox-teams, etc. Customarily the women of the families involved prepared hearty lunches for the builders and completion was celebrated with a feast and dance — often till dawn. Paid help was not a feature of these events.

Barn raisings occurred in a social framework with a good deal of interdependence. Members of rural communities often shared family bonds going back generations. They traded with each other, buying and selling land, labor, seed, cattle, and the like. They worshipped and celebrated together, because cities were too far away to visit with any frequency by horse and wagon.

== Contrast with church construction ==
Churches were considered as important to communities of the 18th and 19th centuries as barns. In like fashion, they were often constructed using unpaid community labor. There were important differences. Churches were not constructed with the same degree of urgency, and were most often built of native stone in some regions — a more durable material than the wood of which barns were made, and more time-consuming to lay. Barns, once completed, belonged to an individual family, while churches belonged to the community.

== Decline ==
Barn raising as a method of providing construction labor had become rare by the close of the 19th century. By that time, most frontier communities already had barns and those that did not were constructing them using hired labor. Mennonite and Amish communities carried on the tradition, however, and continue to do so to this day.

Group construction by volunteers enjoyed something of a resurgence during the 1970s, when houses, sheds, and barn-shaped structures were constructed for a variety of purposes. Echoes of the tradition can still be found in other community building projects, such as house building and renovation carried out by Habitat for Humanity.

== See also ==
- Amish
- Communal work
- Timber framing
