= Saint Lucia at the 2025 World Aquatics Championships =

- Flag of Saint Lucia
- World Aquatics code: LCA
- National federation: St. Lucia Aquatic Federation

in Singapore
- Competitors: 3 in 1 sport
- Medals: Gold 0 Silver 0 Bronze 0 Total 0

World Aquatics Championships appearances
- 1973; 1975; 1978; 1982; 1986; 1991; 1994; 1998; 2001; 2003; 2005; 2007; 2009; 2011; 2013; 2015; 2017; 2019; 2022; 2023; 2024; 2025

Saint Lucia will compete at the 2025 World Aquatics Championships in Singapore from July 11 to August 3, 2025.

== Swimming ==
Saint Lucian swimmers have achieved qualifying standards in the following events.

Men

Athlete	Event	Heat		Semifinal		Final	
Athlete	Event	Time	Rank	Time	Rank	Time	Rank
Antoine Destang	Men's 100 m freestyle	51.11	57	Did not advance			
Antoine Destang	Men's 100 m butterfly	56.19	58	Did not advance			

Women

Athlete	Event	Heat		Semifinal		Final	
Athlete	Event	Time	Rank	Time	Rank	Time	Rank
Mikaili Charlemagne	Women's 50 m freestyle	27.64	59	Did not advance			
Mikaili Charlemagne	Women's 100 m freestyle	1:00.22	54	Did not advance			
Naekeisha Louis	Women's 50 m butterfly	29.46	62	Did not advance			
Naekeisha Louis	Women's 100 m butterfly	1:12.38	55	Did not advance			
