= National symbols of Saint Lucia =

The national symbols of Saint Lucia are the symbols that this Caribbean nation identifies with. The most recognizable national symbols of Saint Lucia are the flag and the coat of arms.

== Flag of St. Lucia ==
The national flag of Saint Lucia.

The national flag of Saint Lucia was adopted on March 1, 1967, upon achieving self-government. The flag was designed by Dunstan St. Omer. The government of St. Lucia gives the following description of the flag:

On a plain blue field, a device consisting of a white and black triangular shape, at the base of which a golden triangle occupies a central position. The triangles are superimposed on one another the black on the white, and the gold on the black. The black ends as a three-pointed star in the centre of the flag. The width of the white part of the triangle is one-and-a-half inches on both sides of the black. The distance between the peaks of the black and white triangles is four inches. The triangles share a common base the length of which is one-third of the full length of the flag.

The blue colour represent fidelity. It reflects the tropical sky and also the emerald surrounding waters of the Caribbean Sea and the Atlantic Ocean. The gold represents the prevailing sunshine in the Caribbean and prosperity. The triangles represent the mountains in St. Lucia. The Triangle, the shape of which is the partition isosceles triangle, is reminiscent of the island’s famous twin Pitons at Soufriere, rising sheer out of the sea, towards the sky -themselves, a symbol of the hope and aspirations of the people.

== Coat of arms ==
The national coat of arms.

The coat of arms of Saint Lucia was designed by Sydney Bagshaw in 1967. The coat of arms is made of a blue shield with a stool, two roses and two fleur de lis. The shield is supported by two Saint Lucian parrots. Beneath the shield is the national motto, where as above the shield there is al torch and on ornament. The symbolism of the elements are:

- Tudor rose - England
- Fleur de lis - France
- Stool - Africa
- Torch - Beacon to light the path
- Saint Lucia parrot - Amazona versicolor, the national bird
- Motto: "The land, the people, the light"

== Anthem ==
The national anthem of Saint Lucia is Sons and Daughters of Saint Lucia. The anthem was first adopted in 1967 upon achieving self-government, and confirmed as the official anthem upon independence in 1979. The lyrics were written by Rev.Charles Jesse, and the music by Mr.Leton Thomas

== Saint Lucian parrot ==
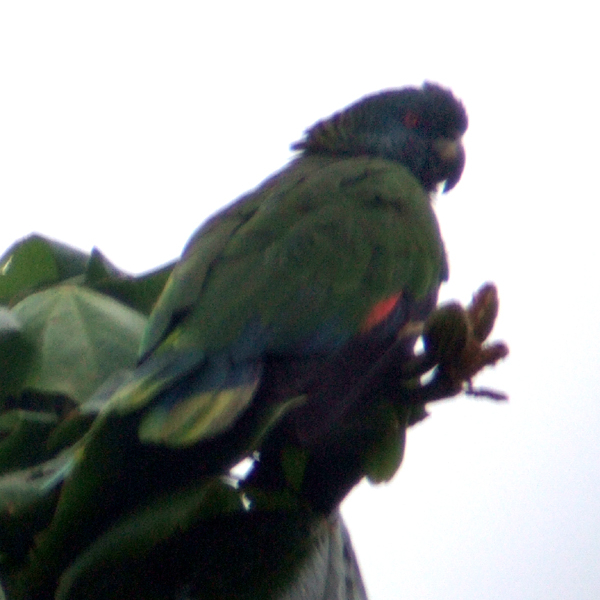
The national bird of Saint Lucia.

The Saint Lucia amazon (also known as the Saint Lucia parrot) (Amazona versicolor) is a species of parrot in the family Psittacidae. It is endemic to Saint Lucia and is the country's national bird.

It was first described by Miller in 1776, this beautiful parrot is, and always has been found only in Saint Lucia. It is predominantly green in colour, and a typical specimen has a cobalt blue forehead merging through turquoise to green on the cheeks and a scarlet breast.

There are no visible differences between the two sexes. Mating for life and maturing after five years, these long-lived birds are cavity nesters, laying two to three white eggs in the hollow of a large tree during the onset of the dry season between February and April. Incubation commences on the appearance of the second egg and lasts 27 days. The young fledge leave the nest 67 days after hatching.

Today the parrot, and most other forms of wildlife are absolutely protected in the country, because Saint Lucia’s national bird remains an endangered species.

== National clothing ==
According to the government of Saint Lucia the national dress are the Wob Dwiyet and the Madras.

The Wob Dwiyrt consists of the following:

- A long petticoat made of cotton or satin and decorated with rows of lace and ribbon.
- The Dwiyet – A full-length outer dress with a trail and narrow sleeves that extend to the wrists.
- A Foulard – A scarf worn around the neck and shoulders with a triangular apex at the centre of the back and attached to the Dwiyet at the front with a brooch. This scarf is made of satin and is usually of a colour that contrasts with that of the dress.
- The Tete Casé – A folded head piece which is decorated to suit the taste or status of the wearer.

In addition, wearers of the Wob Dwiyet adorn themselves with a substantial amount of jewellery including long necklaces and large earrings. The Wob Dwiyet is a style of ladies' dress which began appearing in the French West Indies towards the end of the 18th century. Its design is believed to have originated from Southern France, where women at the time wore a similar outfit.

== National flower, plant, and tree ==
The rose and the marguerite are the symbols of the two flower societies of Saint Lucia. They emerged as winners of the National Flower Competition in September 1985.

The national tree of Saint Lucia is calabash, where as the national plant is bamboo.

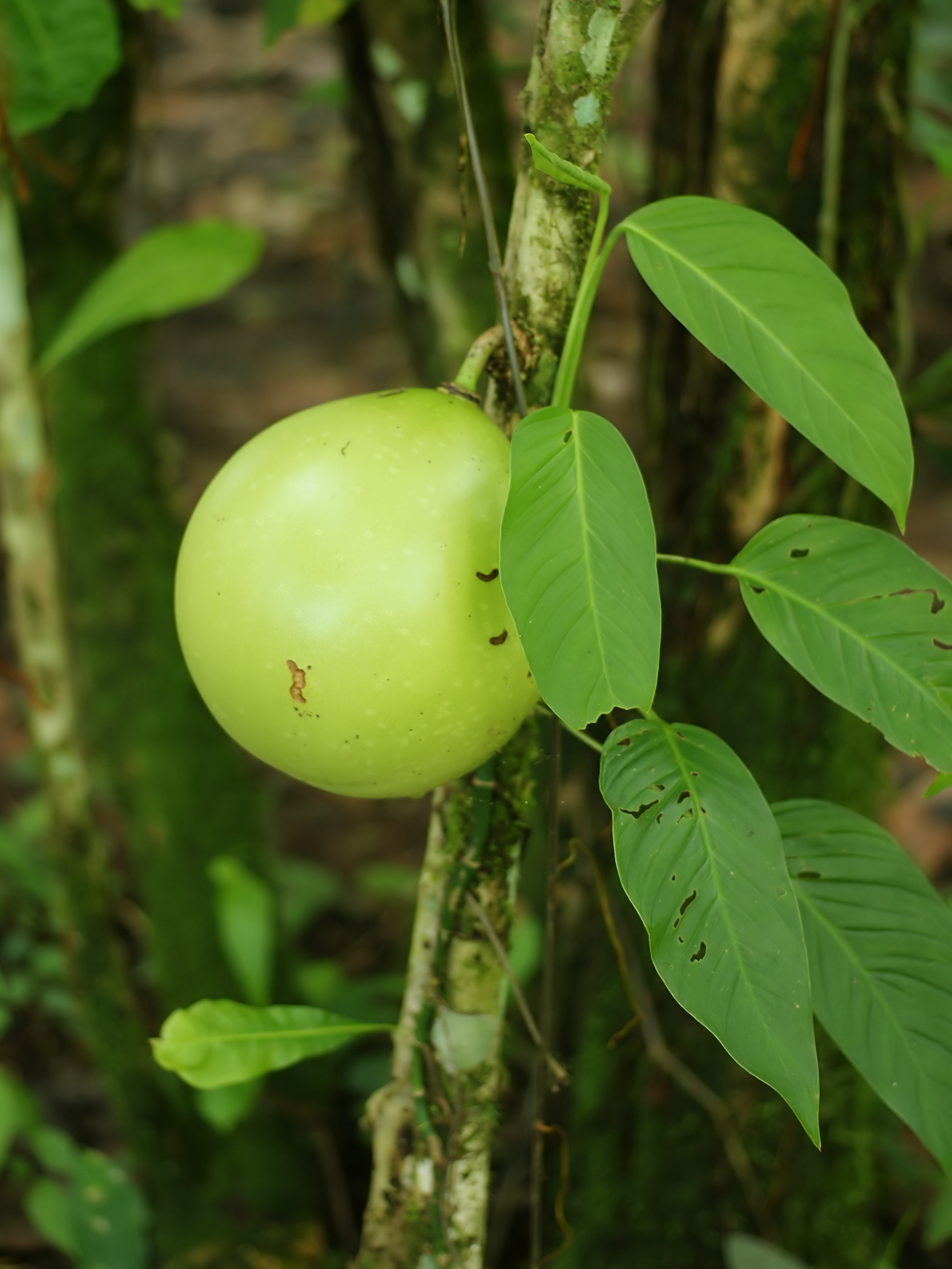
Calabash tree

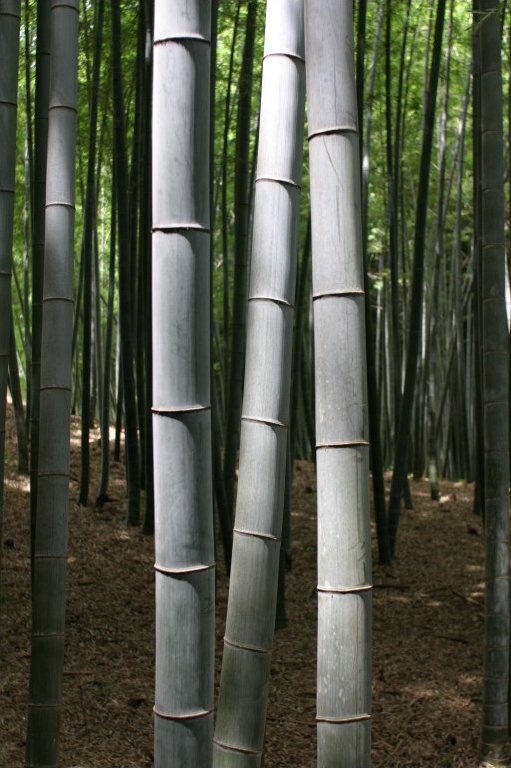
Bamboo tree

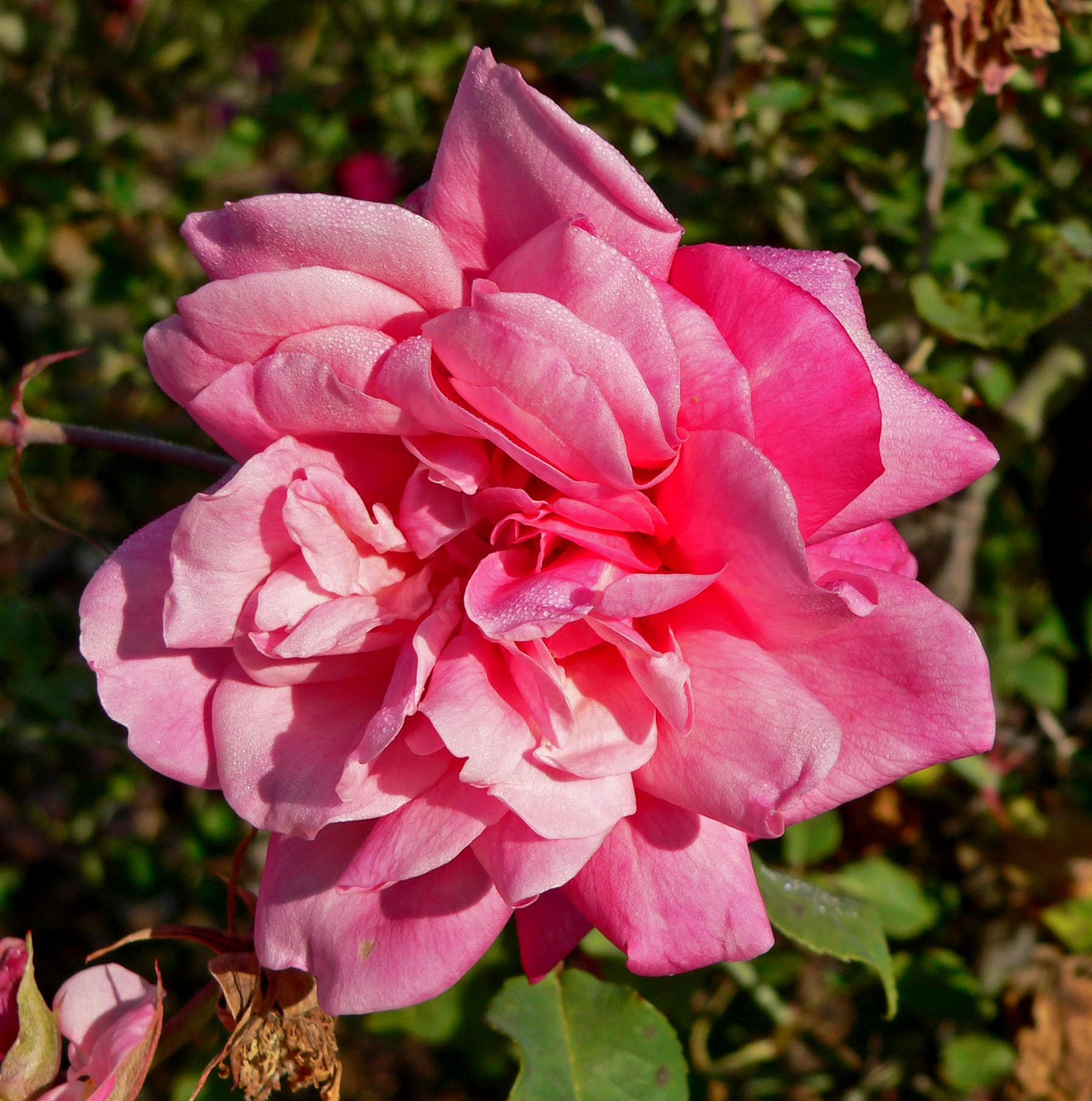
Rose

== See also ==
- Saint Lucia
- Flag of Saint Lucia
- Coat of arms of Saint Lucia
- National anthem of Saint Lucia
