= Saint Lucia at the 2017 World Aquatics Championships =

- Flag of Saint Lucia
- FINA code: LCA
- National federation: Saint Lucia Amateur Swimming Association
- Website: www.slasa.info

in Budapest, Hungary
- Competitors: 3 in 1 sport
- Medals: Gold 0 Silver 0 Bronze 0 Total 0

World Aquatics Championships appearances
- 1973; 1975; 1978; 1982; 1986; 1991; 1994; 1998; 2001; 2003; 2005; 2007; 2009; 2011; 2013; 2015; 2017; 2019; 2022; 2023; 2024

Saint Lucia competed at the 2017 World Aquatics Championships in Budapest, Hungary from 14 July to 30 July.

== Swimming ==
Saint Lucia has received a Universality invitation from FINA to send three swimmers (two men and one woman) to the World Championships.

Athlete	Event	Heat		Semifinal		Final	
Athlete	Event	Time	Rank	Time	Rank	Time	Rank
Jayhan Odlum-Smith	Men's 50 m backstroke	29.95	48	did not advance			
Jayhan Odlum-Smith	Men's 50 m butterfly	26.99	67	did not advance			
Jean-Luc Zephir	Men's 50 m freestyle	23.76	=71	did not advance			
Jean-Luc Zephir	Men's 100 m freestyle	51.98	65	did not advance			
Mikaili Charlemagne	Women's 50 m freestyle	28.26	60	did not advance			
Mikaili Charlemagne	Women's 100 m freestyle	1:02.59	66	did not advance			
