= Saint Lucia at the 2023 World Aquatics Championships =

- Flag of Saint Lucia
- FINA code: LCA
- National federation: St. Lucia Aquatic Federation

in Fukuoka, Japan
- Competitors: 2 in 1 sport
- Medals: Gold 0 Silver 0 Bronze 0 Total 0

World Aquatics Championships appearances
- 1973; 1975; 1978; 1982; 1986; 1991; 1994; 1998; 2001; 2003; 2005; 2007; 2009; 2011; 2013; 2015; 2017; 2019; 2022; 2023; 2024

Saint Lucia is set to compete at the 2023 World Aquatics Championships in Fukuoka, Japan from 14 to 30 July.

== Swimming ==
Saint Lucia entered 2 swimmers.

Men

Athlete	Event	Heat		Semifinal		Final	
Athlete	Event	Time	Rank	Time	Rank	Time	Rank
Jayhan Odlum-Smith	100 metre freestyle	51.51	67	Did not advance			
Jayhan Odlum-Smith	100 metre butterfly	55.86	57	Did not advance			

Women

Athlete	Event	Heat		Semifinal		Final	
Athlete	Event	Time	Rank	Time	Rank	Time	Rank
Mikaili Charlemagne	50 metre freestyle	27.10	57	Did not advance			
Mikaili Charlemagne	50 metre butterfly	29.39	46	Did not advance			
