= Saint Lucia at the 2024 World Aquatics Championships =

- Flag of Saint Lucia
- FINA code: LCA
- National federation: St. Lucia Aquatic Federation

in Doha, Qatar
- Competitors: 4 in 1 sport
- Medals: Gold 0 Silver 0 Bronze 0 Total 0

World Aquatics Championships appearances
- 1973; 1975; 1978; 1982; 1986; 1991; 1994; 1998; 2001; 2003; 2005; 2007; 2009; 2011; 2013; 2015; 2017; 2019; 2022; 2023; 2024

Saint Lucia competed at the 2024 World Aquatics Championships in Doha, Qatar from 2 to 18 February.

== Swimming ==
Saint Lucian swimmers have achieved qualifying standards in the following events.

Men

Athlete	Event	Heat		Semifinal		Final	
Athlete	Event	Time	Rank	Time	Rank	Time	Rank
Tristan Dorville	50 m freestyle	23.70	54	Did not advance			
Tristan Dorville	50 m butterfly	25.50	44	Did not advance			
Jayhan Odlum-Smith	100 m freestyle	51.55	50	Did not advance			
Jayhan Odlum-Smith	100 m butterfly	55.86	45	Did not advance			

Women

Athlete	Event	Heat		Semifinal		Final	
Athlete	Event	Time	Rank	Time	Rank	Time	Rank
Mikaili Charlemagne	50 m freestyle	27.05	56	Did not advance			
Mikaili Charlemagne	100 m freestyle	1:00.05	47	Did not advance			
Naekeisha Louis	50 m butterfly	30.44	44	Did not advance			
Naekeisha Louis	100 m butterfly	1:14.92	42	Did not advance			
