= List of Saint Lucian records in swimming =

The Saint Lucian records in swimming are the fastest ever performances of swimmers from Saint Lucia, which are recognised and ratified by the Saint Lucia Aquatics Federation (SLAF).

All records were set in finals unless noted otherwise.

== Long Course (50 m) ==
=== Men ===
Event	Time		Name	Club	Date	Meet	Location	Ref
50 m freestyle	23.08	b	Jordan Augier	Saint Lucia	17 July 2015	Pan American Games	Toronto, Canada	
100 m freestyle	50.39	h	Jayhan Odlum-Smith	Saint Lucia	30 July 2024	Olympic Games	Paris, France	
200 m freestyle	1:53.26	h	Antoine Destang	Club Wolverine	6 August 2026	Speedo Junior National Championships	Irvine, United States	
400 m freestyle	4:12.90		Antoine Destang	Saint Lucia	9 April 2023	CARIFTA Championships	Willemstad, Curaçao	
800 m freestyle	8:53.44		Antoine Destang	Bolles School Sharks	23 June 2022	FL BSS TYR June Classic	Jacksonville, United States	
1500 m freestyle	18:11.38		Jayhan Odlum-Smith	-	2017			
50 m backstroke	26.80	h	Jordan Augier	Saint Lucia	29 June 2016	Caribbean Island Championships	Nassau, Bahamas	
100 m backstroke	59.17		Jordan Augier	-	2015			
200 m backstroke	2:13.84		Antoine Destang	Etobicoke Swimming	2 June 2022	Age Group International	Etobicoke, Canada	
50 m breaststroke	30.95		Joshua Daniel	-	2013			
100 m breaststroke	1:07.47	h	Bradford Worrell	Saint Lucia	28 July 2013	World Championships	Barcelona, Spain	
200 m breaststroke	2:36.68	h	Terrel Monplaisir	Saint Lucia	20 April 2019	CARIFTA Championships	Bridgetown, Barbados	
50 m butterfly	24.40	h	Jayhan Odlum-Smith	Azura Florida Aquatic Club	27 April 2023	Puerto Rico International Open	San Juan, Puerto Rico	
100 m butterfly	54.74		Jayhan Odlum-Smith	Azura Florida Aquatic Club	19 June 2021	International Meet Ravne	Ravne na Koroškem, Slovenia	
200 m butterfly	2:14.88		Antoine Destang	Team Ontario	8 August 2022	Canada Summer Games	St. Catharines, Canada	
200m individual medley	2:12.17		Antoine Destang	Bolles School Sharks	7 June 2024	FL BSS TYR Sprint to Indy	Jacksonville, United States	
400m individual medley	4:56.66		Antoine Destang	Etobicoke Swimming	2 June 2022	Age Group International	Etobicoke, Canada	
4×50m freestyle relay	1:37.48		DAndre Blanchard; Antoine Destang; Ethan Hazell; Tristan Dorville	Saint Lucia	9 April 2023	CARIFTA Championships	Willemstad, Curaçao	
4×100m freestyle relay	3:51.90			-	2016			
4×200m freestyle relay				-				
4×100m medley relay	4:21.24			-	2016			

Legend: # – Record awaiting ratification by SLAF; WR – World record; AM – Americas record; e – equalled existing record;
Records not set in finals: h – heat; sf – semifinal; r – relay 1st leg; rh – relay heat 1st leg; b – B final; † – en route to final mark; so – swim-off; tt – time trial

=== Women ===
Event	Time		Name	Club	Date	Meet	Location	Ref
50m freestyle	26.99	h	Mikaili Charlemagne	Saint Lucia	30 July 2021	Olympic Games	Tokyo, Japan	
100m freestyle	1:00.27	h	Mikaili Charlemagne	Saint Lucia	25 July 2019	World Championships	Gwangju, South Korea	
200m freestyle	2:15.57		Natasha Georges	-	1 April 2005	-		
400m freestyle	4:43.11		Natasha Georges	-	2 April 2005	-		
800m freestyle	9:44.83		Natasha Georges	-	16 April 2004	-		
1500m freestyle								
50m backstroke	29.98		Siona Huxley	Sharks	12 December 2009	ASATT International Invitational	Trinidad and Tobago	
100m backstroke	1:07.55	h	Siona Huxley	Sharks	27 July 2009	World Championships	Rome, Italy	
200m backstroke	2:35.12		Siona Huxley	Sharks	26 Jun 2012	XiX Caribbean Island Swimming Championships	Oranjestad, Aruba	
50m breaststroke	32.04		Danielle Beaubrun	SeaJays	6 June 2012	Meeting Arena	Canet-en-Roussillon, France	
100m breaststroke	1:10.63	b	Danielle Beaubrun	SeaJays	17 October 2011	Pan American Games	Guadalajara, Mexico	
200m breaststroke	2:43.21		Danielle Beaubrun	SeaJays	2 June 2012	Mare Nostrum	Barcelona, Spain	
50m butterfly	28.50	h	Katie Kyle	Saint Lucia	21 July 2018	CAC Games	Barranquilla, Colombia	
100m butterfly	1:05.74	h	Katie Kyle	Saint Lucia	5 April 2018	Commonwealth Games	Gold Coast, Australia	
200m butterfly	2:31.32		Natasha Georges	-	17 April 2004	-		
200m individual medley	2:41.87		Natasha Georges	-	29 March 2004	-		
400m individual medley	5:36.68		Natasha Georges	-	19 April 2007	Justas do Campeonatos	Ponce, Puerto Rico	
4×100m freestyle relay	4:30.80			-	2004			
4×200m freestyle relay								
4×100m medley relay	5:19.50			-	2004			

Legend: # – Record awaiting ratification by SLAF; WR – World record; AM – Americas record; e – equalled existing record;
Records not set in finals: h – heat; sf – semifinal; r – relay 1st leg; rh – relay heat 1st leg; b – B final; † – en route to final mark; so – swim-off; tt – time trial

=== Mixed relay ===
Event	Time		Name	Club	Date	Meet	Location	Ref
4×100m freestyle relay	3:54.95	h		Saint Lucia	27 November 2021	Junior Pan American Games	Cali, Colombia	
4×100m medley relay	3:58.69							

Legend: # – Record awaiting ratification by SLASA; WR – World record; AM – Americas record; e – equalled existing record;
Records not set in finals: h – heat; sf – semifinal; r – relay 1st leg; rh – relay heat 1st leg; b – B final; † – en route to final mark; so – swim-off; tt – time trial

== Short Course (25 m) ==
=== Men ===
Event	Time		Name	Club	Date	Meet	Location	Ref
50m freestyle	22.73		Antoine Destang	Saint Lucia	7 November 2026	OECS Championships	Castries, Saint Lucia	
100m freestyle	49.77		Antoine Destang	Saint Lucia	8 November 2026	OECS Championships	Castries, Saint Lucia	
200m freestyle	1:49.49		Antoine Destang	Saint Lucia	7 November 2026	OECS Championships	Castries, Saint Lucia	
400m freestyle	4:04.43		Antoine Destang	Saint Lucia	6 November 2026	OECS Championships	Castries, Saint Lucia	
800m freestyle	10:55.88		Jonathan McLennon	-	11 April 2013	RHAC Invitational	Gros Islet, Saint Lucia	
1500m freestyle	17:55.14		Felix Meixner	-	23 March 2006	-		
50m backstroke	25.42		Antoine Destang	Saint Lucia	9 November 2025	OECS Championships	Ratho Mill, Saint Vincent and the Grenadines	
100m backstroke	55.63		Antoine Destang	Saint Lucia	7 November 2025	OECS Championships	Ratho Mill, Saint Vincent and the Grenadines	
200m backstroke	2:20.30		Jordan Augier	Sharks	27 August 2011	Summer Splash	Gros Islet, Saint Lucia	
50m breaststroke	30.47	h	Jordan Augier	Saint Lucia	15 December 2012	World Championships	Istanbul, Turkey	
100m breaststroke	1:06.01		Antoine Destang	Saint Lucia	6 November 2026	OECS Championships	Castries, Saint Lucia	
200m breaststroke	2:36.92		Bradford Worrell	Racers	11 April 2013	RHAC Invitational	Gros Islet, Saint Lucia	
50m butterfly	24.09	h	Jayhan Odlum-Smith	Saint Lucia	19 December 2021	World Championships	Abu Dhabi, United Arab Emirates	
100m butterfly	53.94	h	Jayhan Odlum-Smith	Saint Lucia	3 November 2022	World Cup	Indianapolis, United States	
200m butterfly	2:25.12		Joshua Runako Daniel	Sharks	29 March 2012	RHAC Invitational	Gros Islet, Saint Lucia	
100m individual medley	1:00.22	h	Jordan Augier	Sharks	15 December 2012	World Championships	Istanbul, Turkey	
200m individual medley	2:06.58		Antoine Destang	Saint Lucia	9 November 2025	OECS Championships	Ratho Mill, Saint Vincent and the Grenadines	
400m individual medley	5:16.68		Joshua Runako Daniel	Sharks	29 March 2012	RHAC Invitational	Gros Islet, Saint Lucia	
4×100m freestyle relay								
4×200m freestyle relay								
4×100m medley relay								

Legend: # – Record awaiting ratification by SLAF; WR – World record; AM – Americas record; e – equalled existing record;
Records not set in finals: h – heat; sf – semifinal; r – relay 1st leg; rh – relay heat 1st leg; b – B final; † – en route to final mark; so – swim-off; tt – time trial

=== Women ===
Event	Time		Name	Club	Date	Meet	Location	Ref
50 m freestyle	26.60	h	Mikaili Charlemagne	Saint Lucia	20 December 2021	World Championships	Abu Dhabi, United Arab Emirates	
100 m freestyle	1:00.46	h	Katie Victoria Kyle	Saint Lucia	7 December 2016	World Championships	Windsor, Canada	
200 m freestyle	2:12.08		Natasha Georges	-	7 November 2004	-		
400 m freestyle	4:37.54		Natasha Georges	-	7 November 2004	-		
800 m freestyle	9:33.34		Natasha Georges	-	30 April 2005	-		
1500 m freestyle	22:12.73		Siona Huxley	Sharks Swim Club	27 January 2008	-	Saint Lucia	
50 m backstroke	30.31		Siona Huxley	Sharks Swim Club	20 September 2009	-	Saint Lucia	
100 m backstroke	1:10.02		Siona Huxley	Sharks Swim Club	27 February 2011	Start Up Meet	Gros Islet, Saint Lucia	
200 m backstroke	2:30.07		Siona Huxley	Sharks Swim Club	14 February 2010	-	Saint Lucia	
50 m breaststroke	32.01	h	Danielle Beaubrun	Saint Lucia	15 December 2010	World Championships	Dubai, United Arab Emirates	
100 m breaststroke	1:11.39	h	Danielle Beaubrun	Saint Lucia	17 December 2010	World Championships	Dubai, United Arab Emirates	
200 m breaststroke	2:38.77	h	Danielle Beaubrun	Saint Lucia	19 December 2010	World Championships	Dubai, United Arab Emirates	
50 m butterfly	29.05	h	Katie Victoria Kyle	Saint Lucia	8 December 2016	World Championships	Windsor, Canada	
100 m butterfly	1:06.23	h	Katie Victoria Kyle	Saint Lucia	10 December 2016	World Championships	Windsor, Canada	
200 m butterfly	2:38.66		Natasha Georges	-	18 March 2005	-		
100 m individual medley	1:14.51		Siona Huxley	Sharks Swim Club	15 March 2009	-	Saint Lucia	
200 m individual medley	2:22.82		Sherri Scobie-Henry	-	15 October 2000	-		
400 m individual medley	5:35.91		Natasha Georges	-	18 March 2005	-		
4×100 m freestyle relay								
4×200 m freestyle relay								
4×100 m medley relay								

Legend: # – Record awaiting ratification by SLAF; WR – World record; AM – Americas record; e – equalled existing record;
Records not set in finals: h – heat; sf – semifinal; r – relay 1st leg; rh – relay heat 1st leg; b – B final; † – en route to final mark; so – swim-off; tt – time trial
