= Saint Lucia at the 2013 World Aquatics Championships =

- Flag of Saint Lucia
- World Aquatics code: LCA
- National federation: Saint Lucia Amateur Swimming Association
- Website: www.slasa.info

in Barcelona, Spain
- Competitors: 4 in 1 sports
- Medals: Gold 0 Silver 0 Bronze 0 Total 0

World Aquatics Championships appearances
- 1973; 1975; 1978; 1982; 1986; 1991; 1994; 1998; 2001; 2003; 2005; 2007; 2009; 2011; 2013; 2015; 2017; 2019; 2022; 2023; 2024; 2025

Saint Lucia competed at the 2013 World Aquatics Championships in Barcelona, Spain between 19 July and 4 August 2013.

== Swimming ==
Swimmers from Saint Lucia achieved qualifying standards in the following events (up to a maximum of 2 swimmers in each event at the A-standard entry time, and 1 at the B-standard):

Men

Athlete	Event	Heat		Semifinal		Final	
Athlete	Event	Time	Rank	Time	Rank	Time	Rank
Jordan Augier	50 m backstroke	27.16	33	did not advance			
Jordan Augier	100 m backstroke	1:00.99	45	did not advance			
Joshua Daniel	100 m freestyle	53.69	65	did not advance			
Bradford Worrell	50 m breaststroke	31.00	63	did not advance			
Bradford Worrell	100 m breaststroke	1:07.47	64	did not advance			

Women

Athlete	Event	Heat		Semifinal		Final	
Athlete	Event	Time	Rank	Time	Rank	Time	Rank
Siona Huxley	50 m backstroke	31.33	42	did not advance			
Siona Huxley	100 m backstroke	1:09.05	42	did not advance			
