= Marie Grace Augustin =

Saint Lucian businesswoman and politician

- Born: 2 June 1897; Micoud, Saint Lucia
- Died: 30 March 1996 (aged 98)
- Other names: Grace Augustin
- Occupations: planter, businesswoman, politician, philanthropist
- Years active: 1924–1996

Marie Grace Augustin, OBE (2 June 1897 – 30 March 1996), commonly known as Grace Augustin, was a Saint Lucian businesswoman and politician. After attaining a nursing and midwifery degree, she studied law, but was refused permission to take a bar examination based on her gender. Instead, Augustin became the first woman in Saint Lucia to manage a large estate, becoming a planter. She was the first woman to be nominated as a parliamentarian in St. Lucia and become the first female member of the legislature.

== Early life ==
Marie Grace Augustin was born on 2 June 1897. She was the seventh child of eleven siblings and grew up on her parents' estate, D’aubayan, in Micoud, Saint Lucia. Active and inquisitive, Augustin was a tomboy who enjoyed swimming and riding horses. After completion of her high school studies in Antigua, Augustin passed her Cambridge exams in July 1912. She went on to further her education, studying to be a nurse and midwife, attaining her certificate in 1918 from Victoria Hospital. Articling as a clerk in her brother Elwin's law firm, Augustin studied law for three years. She would have been the first woman lawyer in the Commonwealth Caribbean when she attempted to take the bar exam in 1923, but she was refused based on the fact that she was a woman.

== Career ==
Upon the death of her brother, who had been managing her parents’ estate, Augustin took his place become the first woman to manage a plantation in St. Lucia. She implemented many innovative ideas for the time. Travel by horseback to the capital, Castries, was at that time a two-day journey. Augustin reduced travel time to four hours by riding her motorcycle, which she had imported from England. She opened a grocery store for the surrounding community so that they would not have to make the long journey for supplies, as well as establishing a clinic for medical care. Augustin trained local women as staff for the clinic and arranged for a doctor to visit the community twice a week.

Augustin experimented with different crops, growing cacao, coffea, coconut, mangoes. She was the first person to plant coconuts on a large scale, seeing it as a means to expand the copra industry. When refrigerated ships made further diversification possible, Augustin went into banana production, which soon became the predominant crop. When the local banana crop was infected by blight, Augustin chartered a boat and traveled to Guadeloupe to buy disease-resistant plants to rejuvenate banana industry. At various times, she served as director for the Agricultural Credit Fund, the Banana Growers’ Association, the Coconut Growers’ Association, the Copra Manufacturers’ Association and the Sugar Manufacturers’ Association.

In 1948, a disastrous fire wiped out the heart of the capital causing widespread destruction of businesses and property, leaving many homeless and without means of support. Augustin brought displaced carpenters to her estate to teach furniture making to the men in the local community, providing employment and creating an industry for many. In 1951, she was nominated to serve on the Legislative Council, becoming the first woman to serve in the legislature. Augustin made one of the largest contributions from individuals from St. Lucia to support the Princess Alice Appeal for the College of the West Indies in 1955. She was reappointed to serve on the Legislative Council in 1957 and that same year was honored as an officer of the Order of the British Empire, for her public services.

In its time, Augustin's estate was one of the most iconic on the island and had a wide reputation. Local artists, like Sesenne, Dunstan St. Omer and Derek Walcott benefited from her patronage and were frequent guests. Augustin owned an establishment known as "The Hotel" on the road from Micoud to Castries and employed performers to entertain the guests. Her principal entertainer was Sesenne, for whom she also made introductions to other venues.

== Death and legacy ==
Augustin died on 30 March 1996. Her story has been included in at least two collections of notable St. Lucian women: Blaze a Fire: Significant Contributions of Caribbean Women (1988) by Nesha Z. Haniff and Women in Caribbean Politics (2011) by Cynthia Barrow-Giles.
