= Garth St Omer =

Saint Lucian novelist (1931–2018)

Garth St Omer (1931-2018) was a St Lucian novelist. He was part of an emerging group of St Lucian artists that also included Derek Walcott and Dunstan St Omer. He studied at the University of the West Indies in Jamaica and obtained his PhD from Princeton University. He taught at University of California, Santa Barbara until retirement.

He was known for his fictional works such as Syrop (Faber 1964), Room on the Hill (1968, 2012), Shades of Grey (1968, 2013), and Nor Any Country (1969, 2013). The Lights on the Hill, a novella within Shades of Grey, was published separately in 1986 by Heinemann in its Caribbean Writers Series. Originally published by Faber, his works were reissued by Peepal Tree Press from 2012 onwards.
