= Saint Lucia at the 2019 World Aquatics Championships =

- Flag of Saint Lucia
- FINA code: LCA
- National federation: St. Lucia Aquatic Federation

in Gwangju, South Korea
- Competitors: 4 in 1 sport
- Medals: Gold 0 Silver 0 Bronze 0 Total 0

World Aquatics Championships appearances
- 1973; 1975; 1978; 1982; 1986; 1991; 1994; 1998; 2001; 2003; 2005; 2007; 2009; 2011; 2013; 2015; 2017; 2019; 2022; 2023; 2024

Saint Lucia competed at the 2019 World Aquatics Championships in Gwangju, South Korea from 12 to 28 July.

== Swimming ==
Saint Lucia entered four swimmers.

Men

Athlete	Event	Heat		Semifinal		Final	
Athlete	Event	Time	Rank	Time	Rank	Time	Rank
Jayhan Odlum-Smith	50 m butterfly	25.47	63	did not advance			
Jayhan Odlum-Smith	100 m butterfly	56.31	55	did not advance			
Jean-Luc Zephir	50 m freestyle	23.51	64	did not advance			
Jean-Luc Zephir	100 m freestyle	51.65	=67	did not advance			

Women

Athlete	Event	Heat		Semifinal		Final	
Athlete	Event	Time	Rank	Time	Rank	Time	Rank
Mikaili Charlemagne	100 m freestyle	1:00.27	65	did not advance			
Mikaili Charlemagne	50 m butterfly	29.24	42	did not advance			
Naima Hazell	50 m freestyle	27.85	=59	did not advance			
Naima Hazell	50 m breaststroke	34.79	42	did not advance			
