= Hazel Simmons-McDonald =

St. Lucian writer and linguist

Hazel Christine Simmons-McDonald (1947 – 8 June, 2025) was a St. Lucian writer and linguist. She was known for her work as a professor and administrator at the University of the West Indies, as well as her poetry, which was published in periodicals, anthologies, and the 2004 collection Silk Cotton and Other Trees.

== Early life and education ==
Hazel Simmons-McDonald was born in St. Lucia in 1947. Her uncle was Harold Simmons, often referred to as the father of modern St. Lucian arts and culture.

She studied at the University of the West Indies in Jamaica, graduating in 1972 with a degree in education, with a special focus on English language. She then attended Stanford University in the United States, where, in the 1980s, she obtained two master's degrees, in International Development of Education and Linguistics – followed by a Ph.D. in Applied Linguistics.

== Career ==
=== Academia ===
After graduating from Stanford, Simmons-McDonald taught linguistics there before heading to the University of the West Indies at Cave Hill in Barbados in 1991. She served as both a professor and an administrator at the university, eventually becoming head of the linguistics department and then dean of the Faculty of Humanities and Education. From 2006 to 2008, she led the Society for Caribbean Linguistics as president of the organization.

In 2007, Simmons-McDonald became pro-vice chancellor and principal of the University of the West Indies Open Campus. She retired from her work at the university in 2014.

Her work included research on Creole languages in education and writing instructional texts for native speakers of Antillean Creole. She also co-edited the university's literary magazine, Poui, the Cave Hill Literary Annual.

As an emeritus professor, she helped oversee and review the examinations administered by the Caribbean Examinations Council.

=== Writing ===
Simmons-McDonald wrote both academic works on linguistics in education and works of poetry. She published both poetry and fiction in periodicals, including The Malahat Review, The Literary Review, Poui, Calabash, and BIM.

She co-edited the educational anthologies A World of Poetry and A World of Prose with Mark McWatt in 1994 and worked on subsequent editions.

Her first poetry collection, Silk Cotton and Other Trees, was published in 2004. Her poem "Parasite" appeared in the Oxford Book of Caribbean Verse the following year. Simmons-McDonald's poetry is sometimes characterized by Christian–themed elements.

In 2021, Simmons-McDonald published her first short story collection, Shabine and Other Stories. Critic John Robert Lee wrote that the stories feature elements of "Creole magical realism."

== Recognition and death ==
In 2011, Simmons-McDonald was named an officer of the Order of the British Empire for 'services to education and educational leadership.' In 2022, she was awarded the St. Lucia Cross for her contributions to education and the study of Creole.

She died in 2025 in Barbados at age 78.

== Selected works ==
=== Education ===
- A World of Poetry (1994)
- A World of Prose (1994)
- Writing in English : A Coursebook for Caribbean Students (1997)
- Exploring the Boundaries of Caribbean Creole Languages (2006)
- Education Issues in Creole and Creole-Influenced Vernacular Contexts (2014)

=== Poetry ===
- Silk Cotton and Other Trees (2004)

=== Short stories ===
- Shabine and Other Stories (2021)
