= Harold Simmons (folklorist) =

Saint Lucian folklorist (1914–1966)

- Born: December 2, 1914; Castries, Saint Lucia
- Died: May 6, 1966 (aged 51); Garrand, Babonneau, St. Lucia
- Occupations: Folklorist, artist, historian and social worker

Harold Simmons (December 2, 1914 – May 6, 1966) was a Saint Lucian folklorist, artist, historian, and social worker. He is often referred to as "the father of modern arts and culture in Saint Lucia".

== Early life and education ==
Harold "Harry" Simmons was born in Castries, Saint Lucia, in 1914. He attended Methodist elementary schools and then Saint Mary's College, an all-boys Catholic secondary school. He had no formal university education, which did not stop him from becoming one of the country's most prominent intellectuals.

== Work ==
Simmons' first job after school was at the private firm of W.B. Harris, where he worked for six years. In 1940, he quit to focus on painting. He became one of the island's most important artists of the day and joined the Royal Drawing Society as an associate. He was also a founding member of the St. Lucia Arts and Crafts Society in the 1940s.

His work largely consisted of watercolors of everyday scenes, reflecting his island surroundings.

It was as a painter that he became a mentor to two of the island's best-known creative figures, Derek Walcott and Dunstan St. Omer. A friend of Walcott's late father, Simmons gave them art lessons and encouraged them in their work.

In 1946, Simmons joined the Civil Service, organizing cooperatives and relief efforts in Saint Lucia. He also took on volunteer social work. One of his many volunteer roles was with the St. Lucia Boy Scouts, which later honored him with a Medal of Merit. He also served on a variety of committees including the St. Lucia Tourist Board, the Library Committee, and the Local Advisory Committee.

As a folklorist and amateur anthropologist, Simmons worked to preserve the island's cultural practices through researching and recording folklore. He taped folk songs and stories, which were later distributed as CDs by the Folk Research Centre, and compiled the text Notes on Folklore in St. Lucia, West Indies for Peace Corps volunteers.

He was a great promoter of Saint Lucia and its heritage, choosing to remain on the island as many of his peers migrated elsewhere. He "insisted on fighting colonialism and finding alternatives through art and culture."

Simmons promoted the country's traditional societies and festivals, which the Catholic Church banned nearly a century earlier, and worked to get fellow intellectuals to embrace the island's Afro-Caribbean, Creole culture. While not all of them followed his lead, he was influential for such artists and cultural leaders as the singer Sesenne.

His many interests also included botany and archeology; he was a founding member of the St. Lucia Archaeological and Historical Society and served as the organization's secretary. He also worked as a journalist, including as a Saint Lucia correspondent for the Trinidad and Tobago Guardian and Reuters. From 1957 to 1959, he edited the Voice of St. Lucia newspaper.

== Death and legacy ==
Simmons died in 1966 in Garrand, Babonneau, St. Lucia. He was only 51 years old.

Saint Lucia's Folk Research Centre is inspired by Simmons' work to preserve and promote the island's culture. In 2005, it recognized him as a National Cultural Hero. The Harold Simmons Folk Academy, an arm of the Folk Research Centre, was founded in October 2012. Many of his papers and paintings were destroyed when the center caught fire in March 2018.

Simmons was awarded the St. Lucia Cross posthumously in 2016.
