= Sesenne =

Saint Lucian singer and cultural icon

- Born: Marie Selipha Charlery; 28 March 1914; La Pointe, Micoud, Saint Lucia
- Died: 11 August 2010 (aged 96); Mon Repos, Saint Lucia
- Other names: Sesenne Descartes
- Occupations: Singer, dancer, cultural icon
- Years active: 1922-2010
- Spouse: Tennyson Descartes
- Children: 7

Dame Marie Selipha Descartes, DBE, SLMM, BEM (née Charlery; 28 March 1914 – 11 August 2010), best known as Sesenne, was a Saint Lucian singer and cultural icon. Singing in her native patois language, at a time when authorities barred its use, Sesenne developed a wide following in the rural area in which she grew up. Patronage by St. Lucia's first woman legislator led to the singer's "discovery" by a cultural preservationist, who in turn introduced Sesenne to an American anthropologist to make recordings of her songs.

The recordings were played on the radio, leading to her being selected to be one of the representatives for St. Lucia at the CARIFTA Expo in 1969. Her performance won the competition and many accolades followed. She was inducted into the Caribbean Broadcasting Union Music Hall of Fame and designated as St. Lucia's "Queen of Culture", in addition to having many other awards bestowed upon her.

== Early life ==
Marie Selipha Charlery was born on 28 March 1914 in La Pointe, Micoud, Saint Lucia to Tewannee and Sony Charlery. She was the youngest of five children born to a subsistence farmer and his wife and spent most of her time as a child with her maternal aunt, known locally as "Ma Chadwick". Her aunt, also her godmother, developed in her a strong sense of spiritual devotion and a commitment to the Catholic faith.

Raised in the rural, patois (Creole)Kwéyòl-speaking part of St Lucia, whose customs of flower festivals and séances, were both frowned upon and prohibited by the British elites who governed the island, Sesenne learned to embrace her culture and celebrate its African tradition. She began her schooling at the Patience School but did not complete her primary education, after unfounded gossip by the school principal made her fear for her reputation.

== Career ==
At the age of eight, Sesenne was chosen to be the lead singer, or chantwelle, of a La Rose group in the Micoud area begun by her father. At the time, her father held the title "La Rose King", and her mother served among his followers as "queen". Sesenne became a locally renowned singer of traditional Saint Lucian music, with a unique voice, which could be recognized even within a large group of other singers. Besides singing, she was an accomplished dancer of many styles, including the bakalow, belair, la committee, chalstan, débot, konte, kontwidance, mapa, mazouk, meina, quadrille and ring games. Sesenne's vocal ability allowed her to sing "seven different pitches in synchrony", by touching her throat to change the pitch. She also had an instinctive ability to improvise for dramatic effect which allowed her to discover chords and rhythm which amplified her performances. Sesenne was widely recognized in her rural area, winning many competitions and prizes.

Sesenne's skill with kont brought her to the attention of Grace Augustin, a planter and entrepreneur who owned guest house called The Hotel on the roadway between Micoud and Castries. Augustin hired Sesenne as the principal performer of a band which entertained guests with the use of such traditional instruments as the banjo, chak-chak, guitar, mandolin, quatro and violin. Augustin introduced Sesenne to other hoteliers increasing her reputation, which soon piqued the interest of Harold Simmons, a local cultural advocate. Simmons sent an associate to find Sesenne and convince her of the need to record her music. When she somewhat hesitantly consented, Simmons introduced her to Daniel J. Crowley, an American anthropologist interested in preserving Caribbean folk music. Once the recordings were completed, the music began airing on local radio and propelled Sesenne to even greater fame.

The recording initiative, convinced the government to send Sesenne as one of the performers in the regional CARIFTA Expo '69, (precursor event to the Caribbean Festival of Arts) to be held in Grenada, where she won the event with her rendition of the song "Wai" ("Why"). Her performance was sung entirely in Kwéyòl and energized the audience with numerous standing ovations.

In 1983, plans began for a Jounen Kwéyòl (Creole Day) to mark the importance of the Kwéyòl(Creole) language in St. Lucia and press for its official recognition. Fifteen hours of radio programming, including music, news and poetry performed in(Creole) Kwéyòl, were broadcast by Radio Saint Lucia. The following year, Sesenne opened the festivities, which not only featured broadcasting, but included live performances of dancers, musicians and singers, as well as literature written promoting the language. Later that year, in October, Sesenne was crowned with the title "Queen of Culture in St. Lucia" at a ceremony held with family and friends in the Catholic Church in Mon Repos. The Department of Culture produced an audio cassette with the help of guitarist Ronald "Boo" Hinkson in the 1980s of Sesenne's music. In 1987, Sesenne was honored on International Women's Day by the Ministry for Women's Affairs. Her only album was produced in conjunction with a UNESCO project in 1991.

Sesenne married Tennyson Descartes, a labourer of Micoud and the couple had seven children: five boys and two girls. They made their home in Mon Repos, La Pointe. At the time of her death, Sesenne had 34 grandchildren and 38 great-grandchildren.

== Death and legacy ==
When Nobel Laureate Derek Walcott wrote "my country heart, I am not home till Sesenne sings, a voice with wood smoke and ground-doves in it…" in his poem "Homecoming", Sesenne was immortalized. In 2000, Sesenne was awarded the distinction of Dame Commander of the Order of the British Empire for her community service and cultural preservation efforts. Soon thereafter, the government of St. Lucia built a new home for Sesenne in the Patience community of Micoud. The plans included an initiative for the home to later be converted into the "Sesenne Descartes Folk Heritage Museum", as a repository to preserve the folk heritage of the island. In 2005, the Folk Research Centre designated her as a National Cultural Hero.

Sesenne died on 11 August 2010 in Mon Repos, Saint Lucia, at the age of 96. She was given a state funeral on 28 August 2010 at the St. Lucy's Catholic Church of Micoud. Plans were made to revisit the conversion of her home into a museum and to initiate a program to digitize the works of Sesenne. At her funeral, Prime Minister Stephenson King announced the creation of the "Dame Sesenne Descartes National Endowment for Creative Industries" to promote growth and development of cultural endeavors. In 2014, a biography of Sesenne was included in A. L. Dawn French's book, Profile: Cultural Heroes of Saint Lucia, volume 18 of a series produced by the Folk Research Centre.

== Honours ==
- British Empire Medal (BEM), 1972
- designated as "Queen of Culture", 1984
- inducted into the Caribbean Broadcasting Union Music Hall of Fame, 1991
- Saint Lucia Medal of Merit (SLMM), 1994
- Dame Commander of the Order of the British Empire (DBE), 2000
- National Cultural Hero, 2005
