= Naima Hazell =

Saint Lucian swimmer (born 2005)

Personal information
- Born: 11 June 2005 (age 21)

Sport
- Sport: Swimming

Naima Hazell (born 11 June 2005) is a Saint Lucian swimmer.

In 2019, she represented Saint Lucia at the 2019 World Aquatics Championships held in Gwangju, South Korea. She competed in the women's 50 metre freestyle event. She did not advance to compete in the semi-finals. She also competed in the women's 50 metre breaststroke event and in this event she also did not advance to compete in the semi-finals.
