= Danielle Beaubrun =

Saint Lucian swimmer (born 1990)

Personal information
- Full name: Danielle Elizabeth Beaubrun
- Nickname: Dani
- Nationality: Saint Lucia
- Born: May 6, 1990 (age 36)
- Height: 162 cm (64 in)
- Weight: 50 kg (110 lb)

Sport
- Sport: Swimming
- Strokes: Breaststroke

Danielle Beaubrun (born May 6, 1990 in Saint Lucia) is an Olympic and National Record holding swimmer from the Caribbean island nation of Saint Lucia. She swam for Saint Lucia at the 2008 Olympic Games, where she was the youngest member of the country's Olympic team, and again at the 2012 Summer Olympics.

== Early career ==
Danielle started her swimming career at the age of five with 'learn to swim' classes with the Sea Jays Swim Club, as she became more able, she started competing competitively, coached by her mother, Karen Beaubrun. Six years later, at the age of eleven, she began her training with the Cuban coach, Claribel Blanco with the Rodney Heights swim club. She remained here from March 2002 till December 2004. Her training was then taken over by the Brazilian, Cesar Bolzan.

== 2005 onwards ==
In the 2005 CCCAN Championships, in Santo Domingo, she won the silver medal for the 50m breaststroke, and at the 2003 CCCANs, in Mexico City she won the bronze for the same competition. At the 2009 meet, she won the 18&Over 200 breaststroke in a new St. Lucian Record (2:48.96), and also lowered her national mark in the 50 breaststroke (33.83).

In 2005, she was awarded St Lucias Junior Sportswoman of the Year.

In 2006, Beaubrun represented Saint Lucia in the Commonwealth Games, she was a semi-finalist in the 100 meters breaststroke. At the 2006 CAC Games, she qualified for the 100 and 200 meters breaststroke and she came 4th overall in the 50 meter breaststroke.

In the 2007 she was the only Saint Lucian swimmer to achieve qualifying times for the Pan American Games 2007. She made it into the semifinals and set a new St.Lucian Record for the 100 meters breaststroke.

She attended The Bolles School in Jacksonville Florida from 2006 to 2009, known for producing strong swimmers and attended Florida Gulf Coast University.

She qualified for the 2008 Summer Olympics, but she was unable to progress beyond the first round.

In 2010 she was the flag bearer for Saint Lucia at the opening ceremony of the 2010 Central American and Caribbean Games.

She also qualified for the 2012 Summer Olympics, but was again unable to progress beyond the first round.
