= Coat of arms of Saint Lucia =

- Armiger: Saint Lucia
- Adopted: 1979
- Crest: In front of two Fronds of the Fern Polypoduim [sic] in Saltire a Cubit Arm proper the hand holding erect a Torch Gold enflamed also proper
- Torse: Or and Azure
- Shield: Azure two sticks of cut bamboo in Cross surmounted of an African stool of authority Or between in dexter chief and sinister base a Rose Argent charged with another Gules both barbed and seeded proper an in sinister chief and dexter base a Fleur-de-lis Gold
- Supporters: On either side a Saint Lucia Parrot commonly called Jacquot (Amazona versicolor) wings elevated and addorsed and in the beak of each a Frond of the Fern Polypoduim [sic] all proper
- Motto: The land, The people, The light

The coat of arms of Saint Lucia was adopted on 8 January 1979 by a royal warrant of Queen Elizabeth II. They were adopted to commemorate Saint Lucia's independence from the United Kingdom. They bear emblematic representations of Saint Lucia's past and current national symbols.

== History ==
In 1965, the British Colony of Saint Lucia's Legislative Council passed a motion to request self-government from the United Kingdom. This was granted in 1967. As a result, Saint Lucia requested its citizens to submit designs for national symbols for the country. The coat of arms that were selected by the Saint Lucian government were designed by Sidney Bagshaw. The arms include a Tudor Rose to represent England, a fleur-de-lys to represent France and a stool to represent Africa. The supporters are Amazona versicolors, the Saint Lucian national bird.The national motto (the land, the people, the light) is found at the bottom of the arms.

The arms were formally granted by Queen Elizabeth II, acting as Queen of the United Kingdom shortly before the establishment of her as the Queen of Saint Lucia, and registered at the College of Arms in London. The coat of arms were later used as the inspiration for the logo of Saint Lucia's Caribbean Premier League T20 cricket side, the Saint Lucia Zouks' logo.

== Official description ==
The government of Saint Lucia describes the arms as follows:

Azure two sticks of cut bamboo in Cross surmounted of an African stool of authority Or between in dexter chief and sinister base a Rose Argent charged with another Gules both barbed and seeded proper an in sinister chief and dexter base a Fleur-de-lis Gold and for the Crest upon a Helm with a Wreath Or and Azure in front of two Fronds of the Fern Polypoduim [sic] in Saltire a Cubit Arm proper the hand holding erect a Torch Gold enflamed also proper and for the Supporters on either side a Saint Lucia Parrot commonly called Jacquot (Amazona versicolor) wings elevated and addorsed and in the beak of each a Frond of the Fern Polypoduim [sic] all proper and for the Motto: THE LAND-THE PEOPLE-THE LIGHT

== Historical versions ==
Badge of Saint Lucia from 1875 to 1939.

Arms of Saint Lucia from 1939 to 1967.

Arms of Saint Lucia from 1967 to 1979.
