= Sons and Daughters of Saint Lucia =

National anthem of Saint Lucia

- National anthem of Saint Lucia
- Lyrics: Father Charles Jesse, 1967
- Music: Leton Felix Thomas, 1967
- Adopted: 1979

Audio sample
- U.S. Navy Band instrumental version (one verse): file; help

"Sons and Daughters of Saint Lucia" is the national anthem of Saint Lucia. The lyrics were written by Charles Jesse and the music by Leton Felix Thomas. It was adopted in 1967 when the country achieved self-government from the United Kingdom and was confirmed as the official national anthem upon Saint Lucia's independence in 1979.

== Lyrics ==
Original English lyrics

I
Sons and daughters of Saint Lucia,
love the land that gave us birth,
land of beaches, hills and valleys,
fairest isle of all the earth.
Wheresoever you may roam,
Love, oh, love our island home.

II
Gone the times when nations battled
for this 'Helen of the West',
gone the days when strife and discord
dimmed her children's toil and rest.
Dawns at last a brighter day,
stretches out a glad new way.

III
May the good Lord bless our island,
guard her sons from woe and harm,
may our people live united,
strong in soul and strong in arm!
Justice, Truth and Charity,
Our ideal for ever be!

Saint Lucian Creole lyrics

I
Fi èk fis, manmay Sent Lisi
Chéwi péyi nésans-nou
Péyi montany, lans èk valé
Pli bèl lil ki asou late!
Nenpòt plas nou vwayajé
Toujou chéwi lil natal-nou

II
Sa pa tan nasyon bat ladjè
Pou bèlté Élenn nou-an
Sa pa tan wivòt èk konba
Té twoublé lavi nou tout
Mètnan, syèl-la éklèsi
An lawout nèf ouvè pou nou

III
Dyé, Senyè, benni péyi-nou
Pwotéjé’y kont tout malè
Fè nou viv ansanm an lapé
Fè nou fò an kò é lam
Endé nou tjenn kon pwensip
Jistis, Lamou, Lavéwité!
