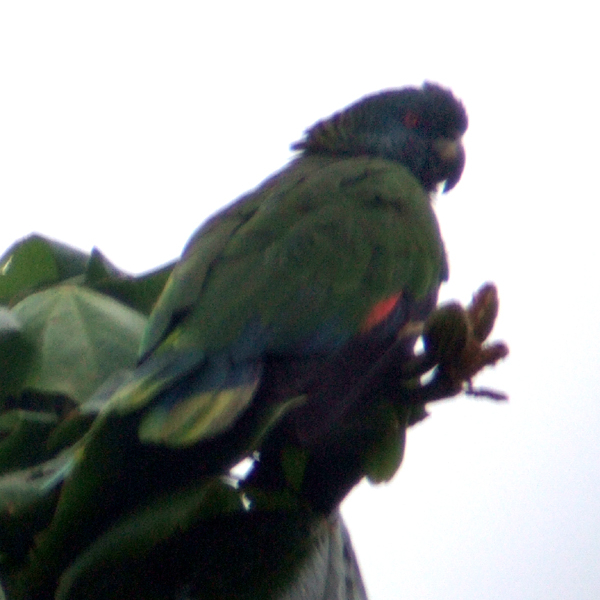
- On St Lucia

Conservation status
- Vulnerable (IUCN 3.1)
- CITES Appendix I

Scientific classification
- Kingdom: Animalia
- Phylum: Chordata
- Class: Aves
- Order: Psittaciformes
- Family: Psittacidae
- Genus: Amazona
- Species: A. versicolor

Binomial name
- Amazona versicolor (Müller, 1776)
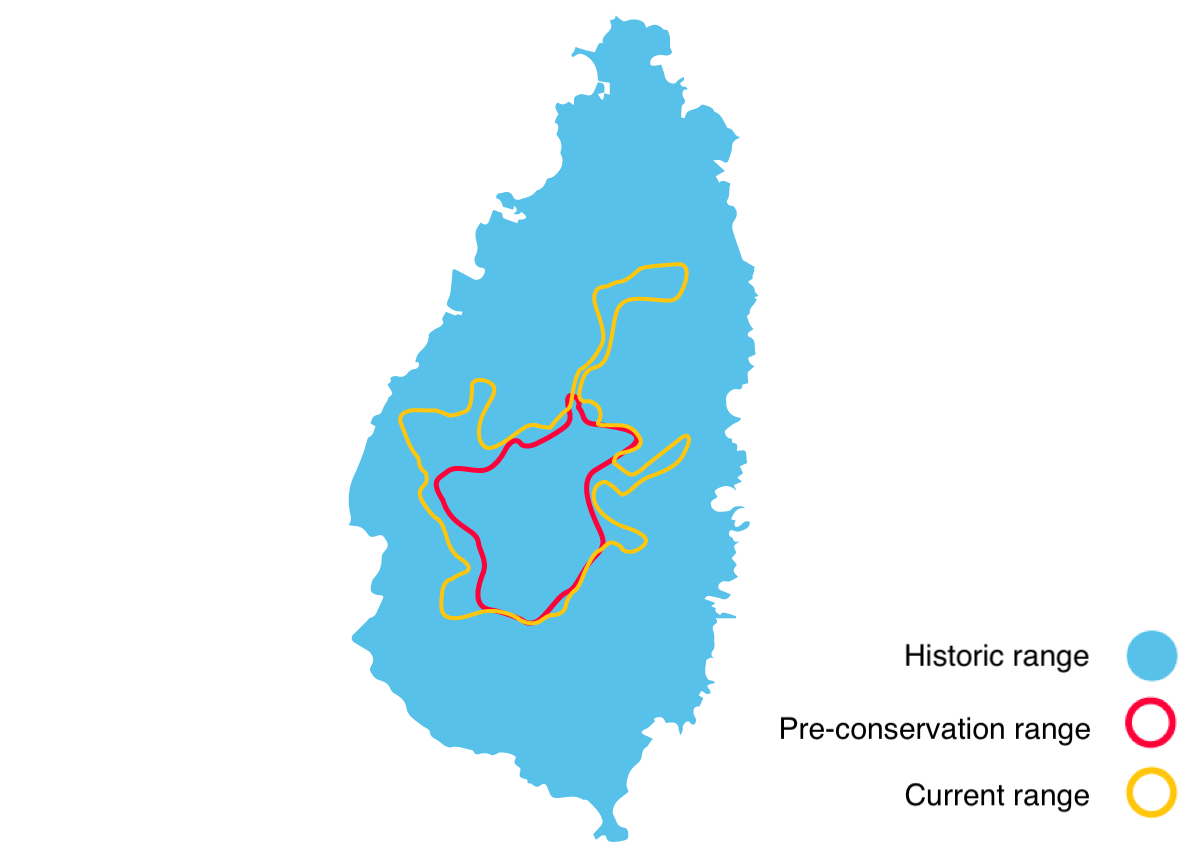

Synonyms
- Psittacus versicolor (protonym)

= Saint Lucia amazon =

Species of bird

The Saint Lucia amazon (Amazona versicolor), also known as the St. Lucia amazon and St. Lucia parrot, is a vulnerable species of bird in subfamily Arinae of the family Psittacidae, the African and New World parrots. It is endemic to Saint Lucia in the Lesser Antilles and is the country's national bird.

== Taxonomy and systematics ==
The Saint Lucia amazon is closely related to the red-necked amazon (A. arausiaca) of Dominica.

== Description ==
The Saint Lucia amazon is 42 to 46 cm (17 to 18 in) long and weighs 505 to 1,000 g (18 to 35 oz). The sexes are alike. Their forehead is royal blue that is lighter on the crown and the rest of the face. Their hindcrown, nape, sides of the neck, and mantle are scaly green. The rest of their upperparts are plain green. Their upper breast is red, their lower breast and belly mottled green and maroon, and their vent area greenish yellow. Their wings are green with a red speculum and dark blue primaries. Their tail feathers are green with wide yellowish tips.

== Distribution and habitat ==
The Saint Lucia amazon is found in the mountains of Saint Lucia's interior. It inhabits tropical moist montane forest at elevations between 500 and 900 m (1,600 and 3,000 ft).

== Behavior ==
=== Movement ===
The Saint Lucia amazon has no known pattern of movement.

=== Feeding ===
The Saint Lucia amazon feeds on seeds and fruit of a variety of palms and other plants.

=== Breeding ===
The Saint Lucia amazon's breeding season includes at least February and March and may continue beyond that. It nests in a tree cavity. The clutch size is two eggs. In captivity the incubation period is 28 days and fledging occurs about 81 days after hatch.

== In captivity ==
Between 1975 and 2021, the Jersey Zoo maintained a breeding colony of Saint Lucia amazons. In 1982, they achieved the first captive breeding success of this species. The offspring of this breeding were returned to the wild. On 2 May 2021, the Jersey Zoo announced that their last amazon died, ending their tenure with this species. It is maintained in a few other collections in Europe.

== Status ==
The IUCN originally assessed the Saint Lucia amazon in 1988 as Threatened and since 1994 as Vulnerable. Its estimated population of 1150 to 1500 mature individuals is believed to be increasing. The population was thought to total about 1000 in 1950 but declined to about 150 by the late 1970s as a result of habitat loss, hunting for food, the pet trade, and hurricanes. The species' plight at that time prompted conservation measures with "strong national and popular support"; the population had increased to about 300 by 1990 and has continued to increase.
