= Dunstan St. Omer =

Saint Lucian painter (1927-2015)

Sir Dunstan St. Omer
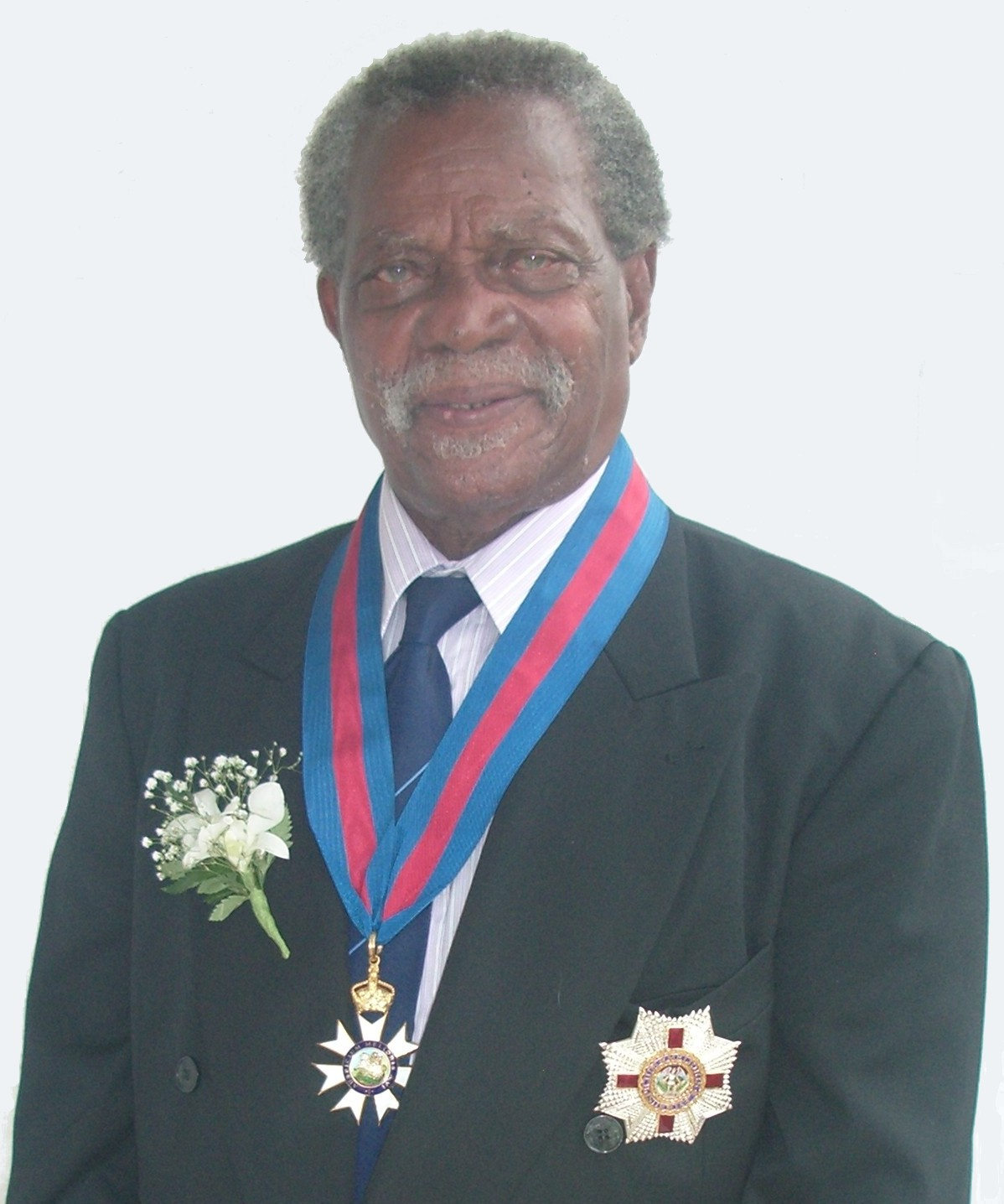
- St. Omer in 2010
- Born: Dunstan Gerbert Raphael St. Omer; 23 October 1927; Castries, Saint Lucia
- Died: 5 May 2015 (aged 87); Union, Castries, Saint Lucia
- Occupations: Painter and muralist
- Notable work: Flag of Saint Lucia
- Spouse: Cynthia St. Croix
- Children: 9

Sir Dunstan Gerbert Raphael St. Omer, KCMG MBE SLC (24 October 1927 – 5 May 2015) was a Saint Lucian painter, muralist and educator. He designed the national flag of Saint Lucia.

== Early life ==
Dunstan St. Omer was born in Castries on 24 October 1927. He attended St. Aloysius R.C. Boys School and Saint Mary's College.

== Career ==
St. Omer left Saint Lucia for Curaçao where he was influenced by the Greek artist Pandelis. He returned to Saint Lucia in 1949 and held various teaching jobs.

St. Omer was the editor of The Voice newspaper from 1959–1962.

St. Omer painted several murals in churches around Saint Lucia including the Cathedral Basilica of the Immaculate Conception. His murals feature black divinity portraying Christ and the Holy Family as black.

In 1967, St. Omer designed the flag of Saint Lucia, winning a national contest for the best flag design marking Saint Lucia's statehood.

He taught art from 1971 until his retirement in 2002. He also worked as an art specialist in the Ministry of Education.

== Honours ==
In 2004, St. Omer received the Papal Medal from the Catholic Church and the Saint Lucia Cross from the government of Saint Lucia for his church murals. In 2007, the National Cultural Centre declared him a National Cultural Hero. He was appointed Knight Commander of the Order of St Michael and St George in 2010 for service to Art.

== Personal life ==
Dunstan St. Omer was married to Cynthia St. Croix. They had nine children.
