= Jayhan Odlum-Smith =

Saint Lucian swimmer (born 2002)

Personal information
- Nationality: Saint Lucian
- Born: 11 January 2002 (age 24)

Sport
- Sport: Swimming

Jayhan Odlum-Smith (born 11 January 2002) is a Saint Lucian swimmer. He competed in the men's 50 metre butterfly event at the 2017 World Aquatics Championships. In 2019, he represented Saint Lucia at the 2019 World Aquatics Championships held in Gwangju, South Korea. He competed in the men's 50 metre butterfly and men's 100 metre butterfly events.
