= Mikaili Charlemagne =

Saint Lucian swimmer (born 2003)

Personal information
- Nickname: Kalie
- Born: 1 April 2003 (age 23) Saint Lucia

Sport
- Sport: Swimming
- Strokes: Freestyle
- College team: Springfield College

Mikaili Charlemagne (born 1 April 2003) is a Saint Lucian swimmer. Mikaili was brought up in a mostly female house whole with her mother Constance Rene and Grandmother, Theresa Rene. She has always been close to her father Gabriel Charlemagne. As a child Charlemagne was into various sports but swimming caught her eye.Charlemagne represented her country at the 2020 Tokyo Olympic Games in the women's 50 metre freestyle event. She competed in the women's 100 metre freestyle event at the 2017 World Aquatics Championships. In 2019, she represented Saint Lucia at the 2019 World Aquatics Championships held in Gwangju, South Korea. She competed in the women's 50 metre butterfly and women's 100 metre freestyle events.

In Tokyo, Charlemagne finished with a time of 26.99, setting a new national record. Mikaili Charlemagne competed in the Commonwealth Games in 2022, in the women’s 50 meter freestyle and the women’s 50 meter butterfly setting two new national records. She bettered the 26.99 with a 26.75 in the women’s 100 meter freestyle and stopped the clock at 28.48 in the women’s 50 meter butterfly. Mikaili Charlemagne is a graduate student at Yale University.
