= Saint Lucia at the 2011 World Aquatics Championships =

Sporting event delegation

Flag of Saint Lucia

Saint Lucia competed at the 2011 World Aquatics Championships in Shanghai, China between July 16 and 31, 2011.

== Swimming ==
Saint Lucia qualified 3 swimmers.

Men

Athlete	Event	Heats		Semifinals		Final	
Athlete	Event	Time	Rank	Time	Rank	Time	Rank
Julien Brice	Men's 50m Freestyle	24.59	56	did not advance			
Julien Brice	Men's 100m Freestyle	54.99	74	did not advance			

Women

Athlete	Event	Heats		Semifinals		Final	
Athlete	Event	Time	Rank	Time	Rank	Time	Rank
Siona Huxley	Women's 50m Freestyle	29.79	59	did not advance			
Siona Huxley	Women's 100m Backstroke	1:08.96	50	did not advance			
Danielle Beaubrun	Women's 50m Breaststroke	32.27	19	did not advance			
Danielle Beaubrun	Women's 100m Breaststroke	1:11.34	32	did not advance			
