= Flag of Saint Lucia =

Saint Lucia
- Use: National flag and ensign
- Proportion: 1:2
- Adopted: 1 March 1967; 59 years ago (last modified in 2002)
- Design: A light blue field with a small golden isosceles triangle in front of a large white-edged black isosceles triangle in the centre.
- Designed by: Dunstan St Omer
- Standard of the governor-general of Saint Lucia
- Proportion: 1:2
- Adopted: 1979; 47 years ago

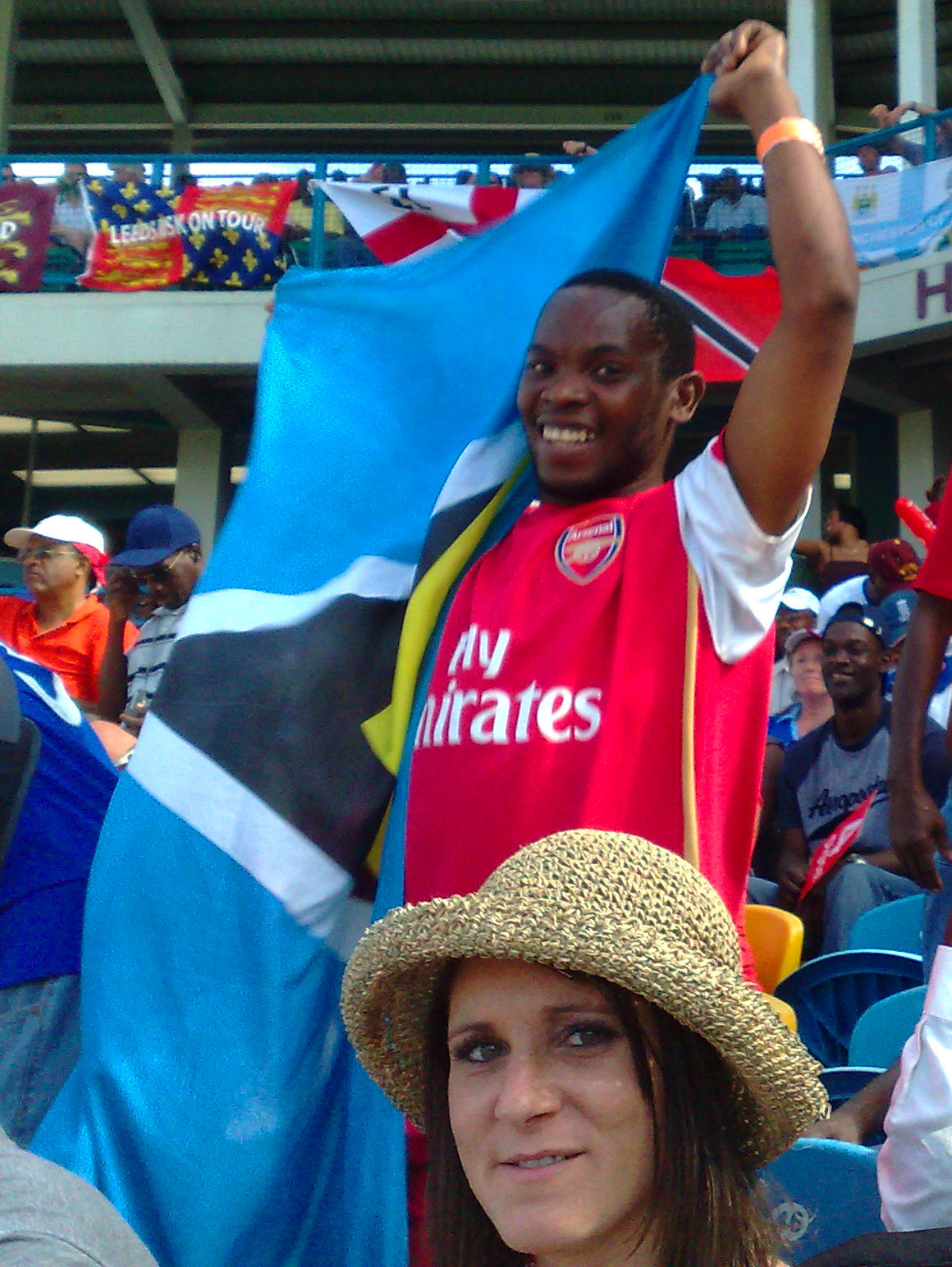
Man with St Lucian flag at a cricket match

The national flag of Saint Lucia consists of a cerulean blue field charged with a golden triangle in front of a white-edged black isosceles triangle. Adopted in 1967 to replace the British Blue Ensign defaced with the arms of the colony, it has been the flag of Saint Lucia since the country became an associated state of the United Kingdom that year. Although the overall design of the flag has remained unchanged, specific aspects of it have been altered over the years.

== History ==
The French colonised Saint Lucia in 1635 and subsequently signed a treaty with the local indigenous population 25 years later in 1660. However, the British vied for control with the French, and the island frequently switched hands between the two powers. This continued until 1814, when the Treaty of Paris was signed that saw France permanently relinquish Saint Lucia to the British, and it became a crown colony of the United Kingdom within its colonial empire in that same year. During this colonial period of French and British rule, Saint Lucia did not have its own unique colonial flag.

The British finally granted Saint Lucia its own unique coat of arms in August 1939. The escutcheon consisted of a black shield featuring two sticks of bamboo forming a cross, with two Tudor roses symbolising England and two fleurs-de-lis symbolising France occupying the four quadrants. This emblem was utilised to deface the British Blue Ensign in order to form the territory's flag.

The island became part of the West Indies Federation from 1958 to 1962. However, this political union turned out to be unsuccessful, and on 1 March 1967 – five years after the federation was dissolved – Saint Lucia became an Associated State. This gave the territory full control over domestic matters, while Britain retained responsibility for the island's foreign affairs and defence. The territory's new flag, which was designed by native Saint Lucian artist Dunstan St Omer, was adopted on that same day. When Saint Lucia became an independent country on 22 February 1979, the overall design of the flag from twelve years before remained unchanged, but the blue colour's shade and the triangles' sizes were modified marginally. Despite the fact that the island already had its own distinct flag by the time it became a sovereign state, the Union Jack was still lowered for the final time at the official ceremony marking independence.

== Design ==
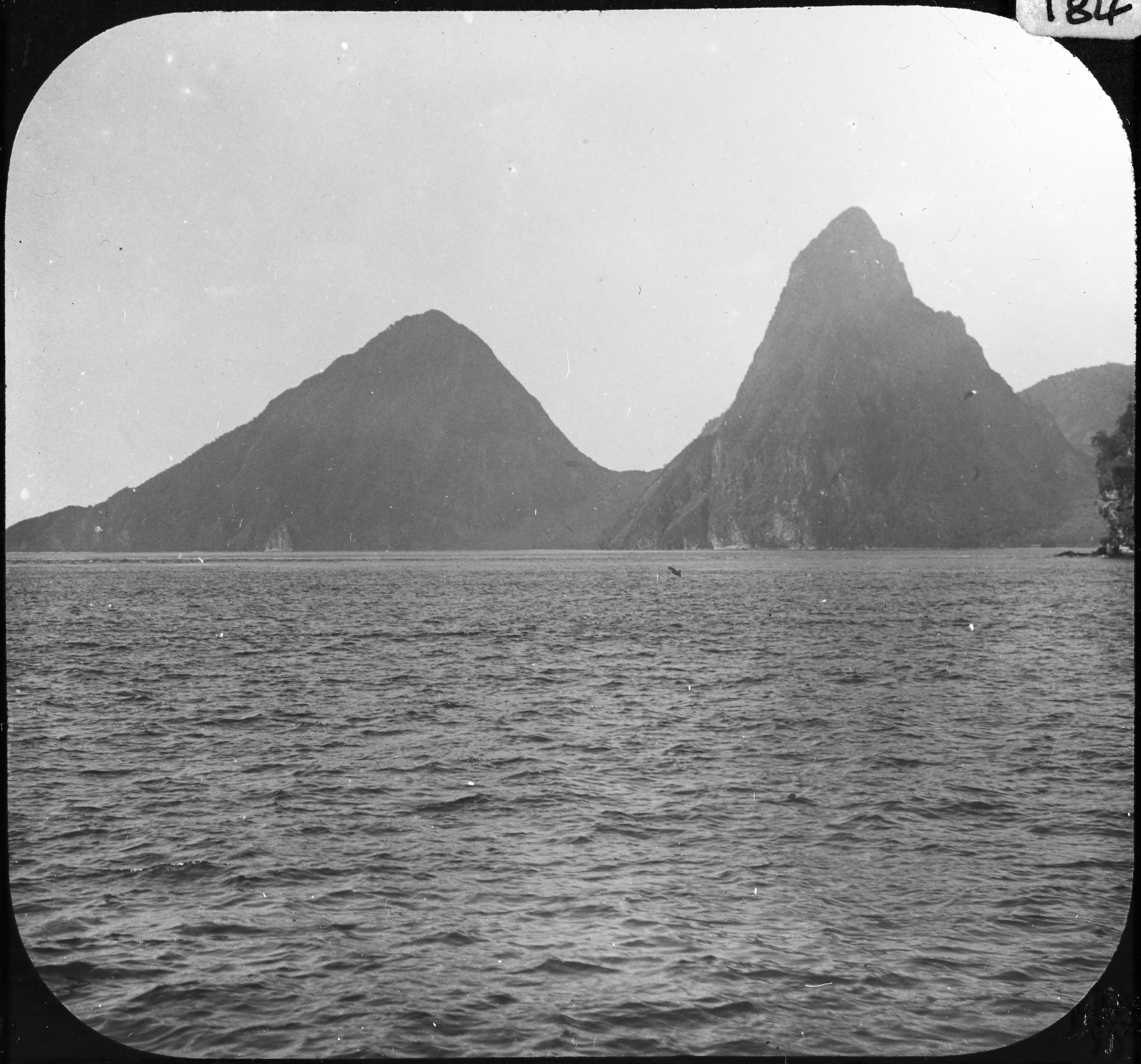
A 1903 image of the Pitons, the two conical volcanic edifices that are stylised as the two central triangles of the flag.

The colours and symbols of the flag carry cultural, political, and regional meanings. The blue epitomises the sky and the sea, specifically the Atlantic Ocean and Caribbean Sea which encircle the country. The black and white allude to the harmonious relationship between the black and white races. The yellow symbolises the sunshine, as well as prosperity. The triangles represent the Pitons, which are twin volcanic cones located in the southwest part of the island and unity; Gros Piton and Petit Piton are a national symbol of Saint Lucia.

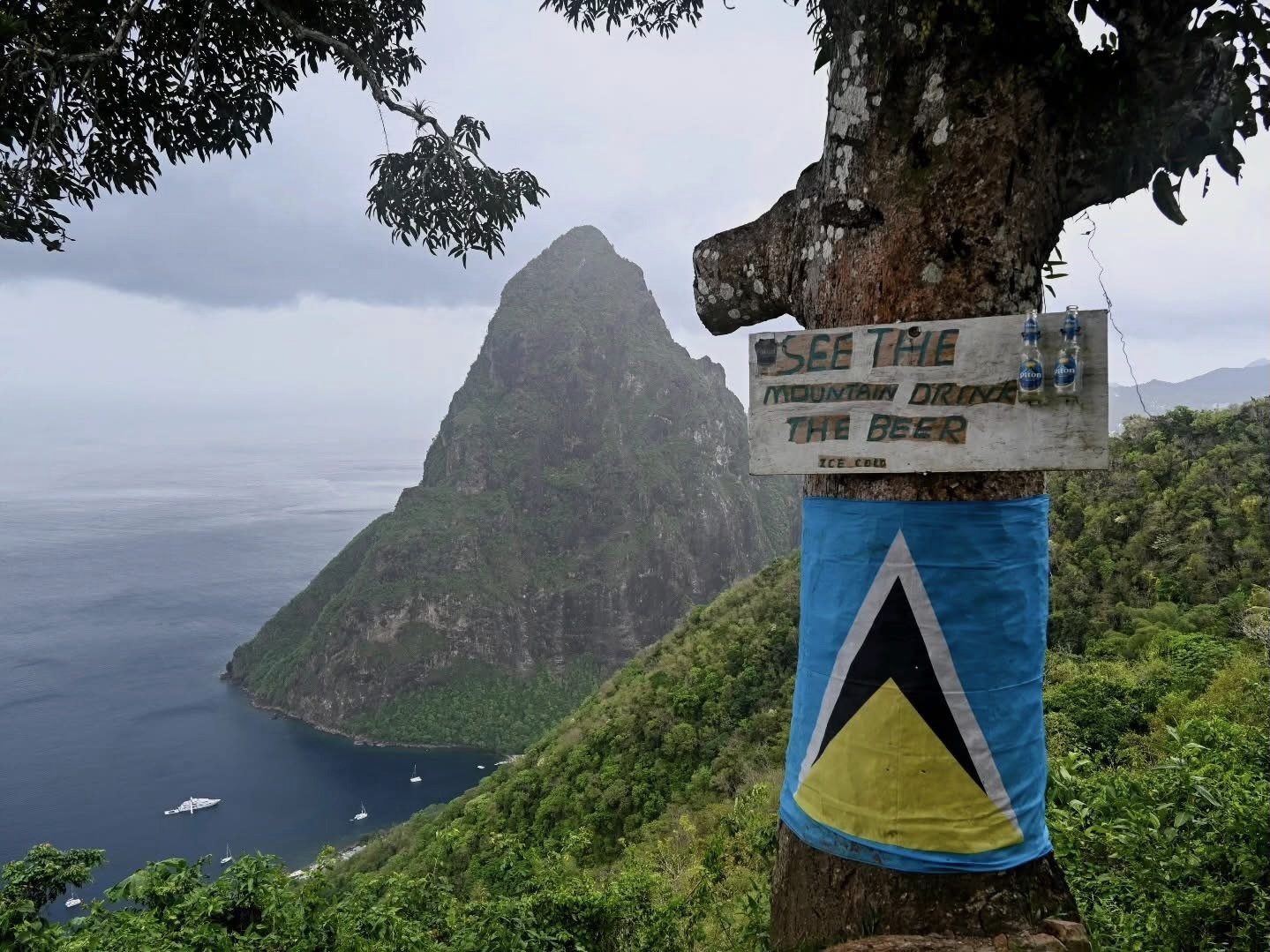
The flag at a viewpoint overlooking Petit Piton

== Historical flags ==
Flag	Duration	Use	Description
	1766–1796	Flag of the French Colony of Saint Lucia	The drapeau aux serpents was adopted by French colonial officials in 1766 for use as a civil ensign in both St Lucia and Martinique. The flag features a white cross on a blue field with four L-shaped (for Lucia) white fer-de-lance vipers in each quarter.
	1796–1801	Flag of the United Kingdom	Following the British annexation of the island the Kings Colours became the official flag of the colony.
	1801–1875	Flag of the United Kingdom	In 1801 the Union Jack was adapted to include the St. Patrick's saltire. This would be the official flag of the island until its adoption of a unique colonial ensign.
	1875–1939	Flag of the British Colony of Saint Lucia	The Latin motto in the seal reads: STATIO HAUD MALEFIDA CARINIS (roughly, "Hardly a faithless guard for ships").
	1875–1939	Flag of the governor of Saint Lucia	The Union Jack defaced in the centre with the 1875 arms of Saint Lucia surrounded by a laurel wreath.
	1939–1967	Flag of the British Colony of Saint Lucia	A British Blue Ensign defaced with the arms of the colony. This consisted of a black shield featuring two sticks of bamboo forming a cross, with two Tudor roses symbolising England and two fleurs-de-lis symbolising France occupying the four quadrants.
	1939–1979	Flag of the governor of Saint Lucia	The Union Jack defaced in the centre with a white disc containing the 1939 arms of Saint Lucia and surrounded by a laurel wreath.
	1967–1979	Flag of Saint Lucia	A cerulean blue field charged with a yellow triangle in front of a white-edged black arrowhead.
	1979–2002	Flag of Saint Lucia	A cerulean blue field charged with a yellow triangle in front of a white-edged black arrowhead. The yellow triangle was enlarged and the arrowhead made narrower.
